= Bucks County, Pennsylvania =

County in Pennsylvania, United States

- County
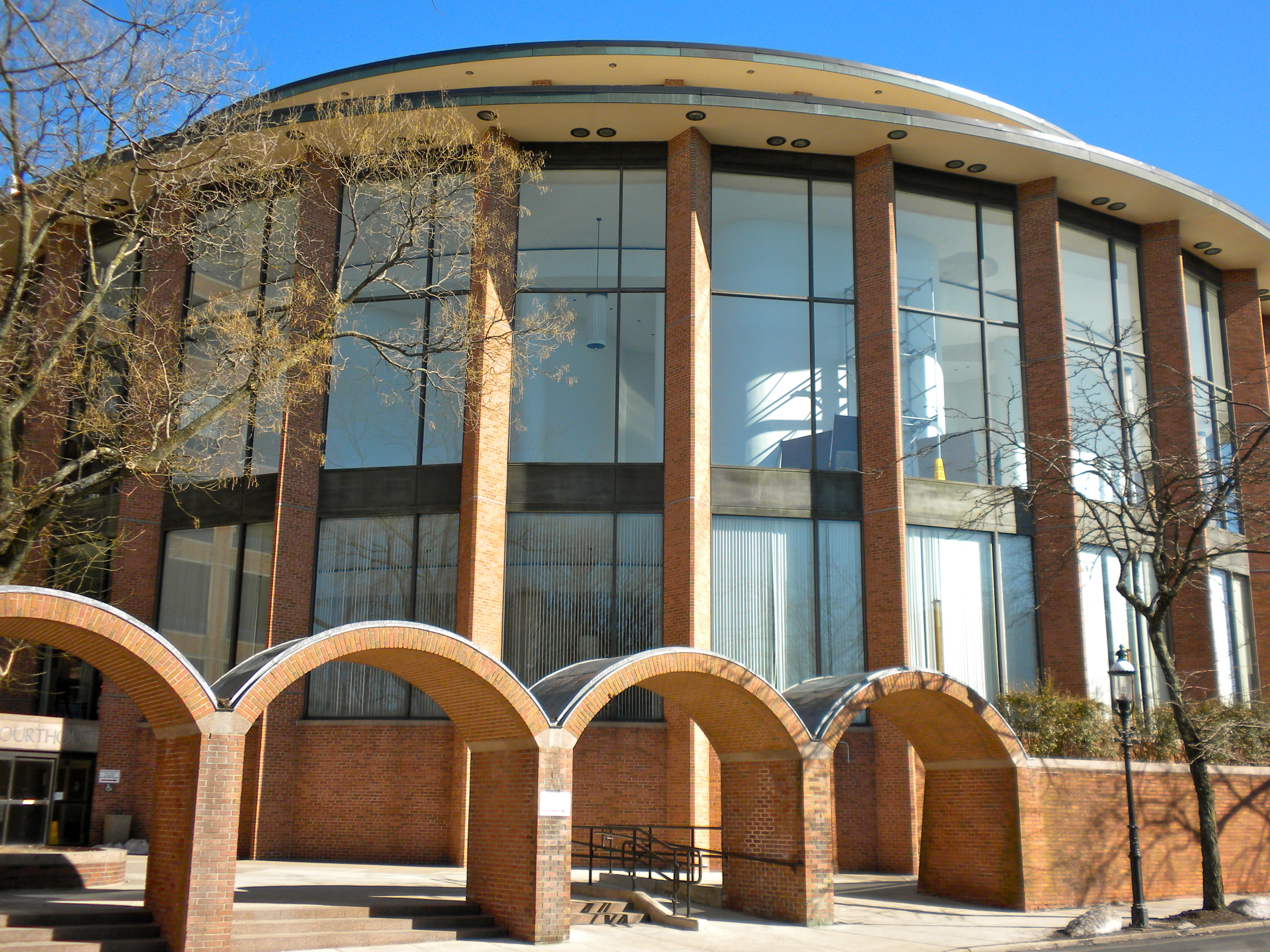
- Bucks County Administration Building in Doylestown in 2010

- Flag Seal Logo

- Location within the U.S. state of Pennsylvania
- Interactive map of Bucks County, Pennsylvania
- Coordinates: 40°20′N 75°07′W
- Country: United States
- State: Pennsylvania
- Founded: November 1682
- Named for: Buckinghamshire, England
- Seat: Doylestown
- Largest township: Bensalem

Area
  - Total: 622 sq mi (1,610 km^{2})
  - Land: 604 sq mi (1,560 km^{2})
  - Water: 18 sq mi (47 km^{2}) 2.8%

Population (2020)
  - Total: 646,538
  - Estimate (2025): 647,828 ▲
  - Density: 1,070/sq mi (410/km^{2})
- Time zone: UTC−5 (Eastern)
  - Summer (DST): UTC−4 (EDT)
- Congressional district: 1st
- Website: www.buckscounty.gov

Pennsylvania Historical Marker
- Designated: October 29, 1982

Bucks County is a county in the Commonwealth of Pennsylvania. As of the 2020 census, the population was 646,538, making it the fourth-most populous county in Pennsylvania. Its county seat is Doylestown. The county is named after the English county of Buckinghamshire. The county is part of the Southeast region of the commonwealth. (Note: Includes Philadelphia, Montgomery, Bucks, Delaware, Chester, Lehigh and Northampton Counties)

The county represents the northern boundary of the Philadelphia metropolitan area.

To its southwest, Bucks County borders Montgomery County and Philadelphia, the nation's sixth-largest city. To its east, the county borders the Delaware River and U.S. state of New Jersey. To its north, the county borders Lehigh and Northampton counties in the state's Lehigh Valley region. The county is approximately 30 miles (48 km) southeast of Allentown, the state's third-largest city, and 40 miles (64 km) north of Philadelphia, the state's largest city.

== History ==
=== Founding ===
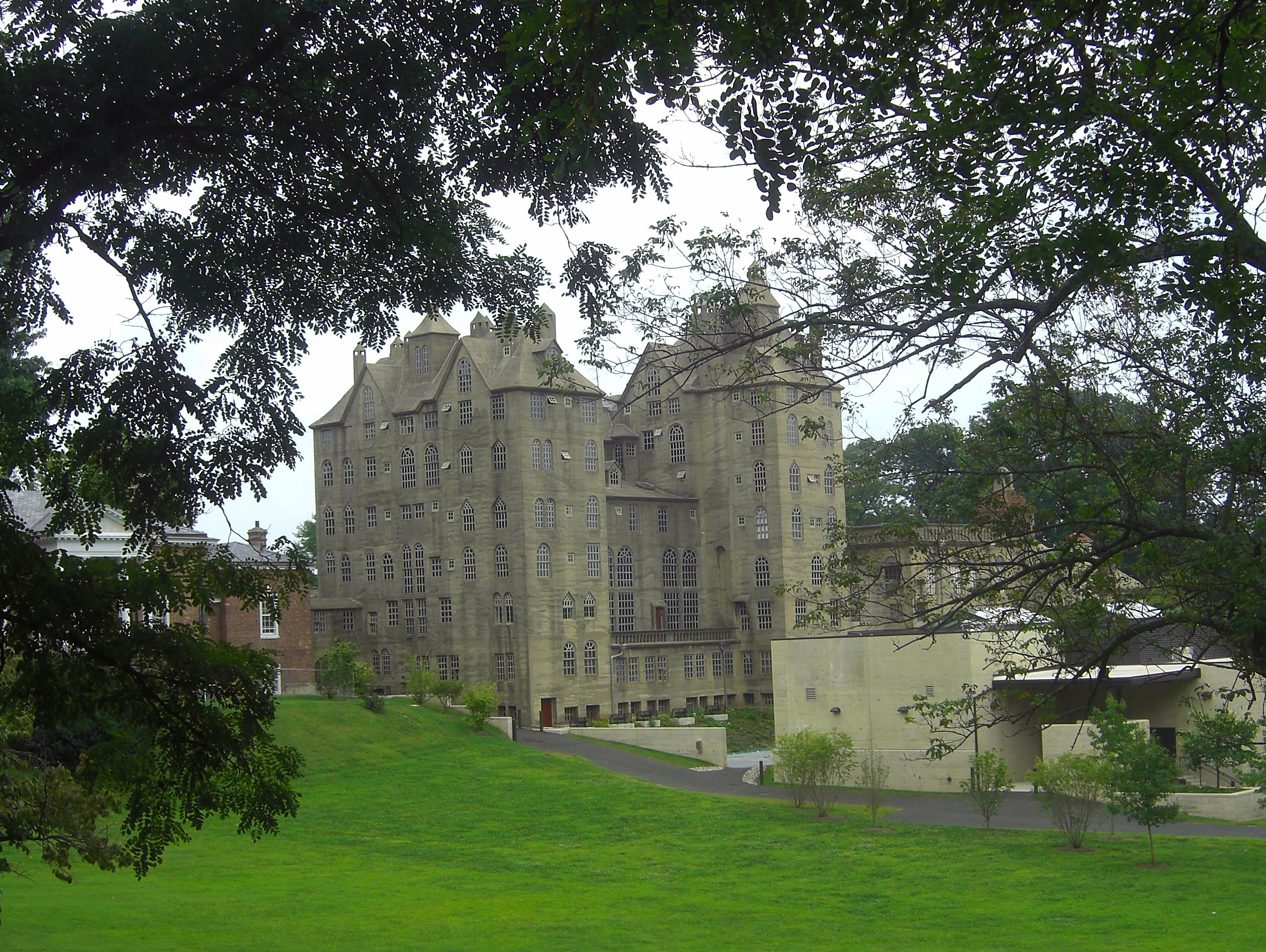
Mercer Museum in Doylestown

Bucks County is one of the three original counties created by colonial proprietor William Penn in 1682. Penn named the county after Buckinghamshire, the county in which he lived in England; "Bucks" is the traditional abbreviation for the English county, which became the actual name of the Pennsylvania one. He built a country estate, Pennsbury Manor, in Falls Township in present-day Bucks County.

Some places in Bucks County were named after locations in Buckinghamshire, including Buckingham and Buckingham Township, named after the former county town of Buckinghamshire; Chalfont, named after Chalfont St Giles, the parish home of William Penn's first wife and the location of the Jordans Quaker Meeting House, where Penn is buried; Solebury, named after Soulbury, England; and Wycombe, named after the town of High Wycombe.

Bucks County was originally much larger than it is today. Northampton County was formed in 1752 from part of Bucks County, and Lehigh County was formed in 1812 from part of Northampton County.

=== American Revolutionary War ===
General George Washington and his troops camped in Bucks County as they prepared to cross the Delaware River to take Trenton, New Jersey by surprise on the morning of December 26, 1776. Their successful attack on Britain's Hessian forces was a turning point in the American Revolutionary War. The town of Washington Crossing, Pennsylvania and Washington Crossing Historic Park were named to commemorate the event.

== Geography ==
According to the U.S. Census Bureau, the county has a total area of 622 square miles (1,610 km^{2}), of which 604 square miles (1,560 km^{2}) is land and 18 square miles (47 km^{2}) (2.8%) is water.

The southern third of the county between Philadelphia and Trenton, New Jersey, often called Lower Bucks, resides in the Atlantic Coastal Plain; it is flat and near sea level, and is the county's most populated and industrialized area.

Bucks County shares a western border with Montgomery County, and also borders Philadelphia to the southwest, and Northampton and Lehigh Counties to the north. From north to south, it is linked to Warren, Hunterdon, Mercer and Burlington Counties in New Jersey by bridges.

Tohickon Creek and Neshaminy Creek are the largest tributaries of the Delaware in Bucks County. Tohickon Creek empties into the river at Point Pleasant and Neshaminy at Croydon (Bristol Township).

== Demographics ==
Historical population
Census	Pop.	Note	%±
1790	25,216		—
1800	27,496		9.0%
1810	32,371		17.7%
1820	37,842		16.9%
1830	45,745		20.9%
1840	48,107		5.2%
1850	56,091		16.6%
1860	63,578		13.3%
1870	64,336		1.2%
1880	68,656		6.7%
1890	70,615		2.9%
1900	71,190		0.8%
1910	76,530		7.5%
1920	82,476		7.8%
1930	96,727		17.3%
1940	107,715		11.4%
1950	144,620		34.3%
1960	308,567		113.4%
1970	410,056		32.9%
1980	479,211		16.9%
1990	541,174		12.9%
2000	597,635		10.4%
2010	625,249		4.6%
2020	646,538		3.4%
2025 (est.)	647,828	▲	0.2%
U.S. Decennial Census; 1790-1960 1900-1990; 1990-2000 2010-2019

=== 2020 census ===
As of the 2020 census, the county had a population of 646,538. The median age was 44.4 years. 20.3% of residents were under the age of 18 and 19.8% of residents were 65 years of age or older. For every 100 females there were 96.2 males, and for every 100 females age 18 and over there were 94.2 males age 18 and over.

As of the 2020 census, the racial makeup of the county was 82.0% White, 4.1% Black or African American, 0.2% American Indian and Alaska Native, 5.4% Asian, <0.1% Native Hawaiian and Pacific Islander, 2.6% from some other race, and 5.7% from two or more races. Hispanic or Latino residents of any race comprised 6.2% of the population.

The 2020 census reported that 89.7% of residents lived in urban areas, while 10.3% lived in rural areas.

The 2020 census recorded 245,587 households in the county, of which 29.4% had children under the age of 18 living in them. Of all households, 55.8% were married-couple households, 15.2% were households with a male householder and no spouse or partner present, and 23.2% were households with a female householder and no spouse or partner present. About 23.9% of all households were made up of individuals and 11.6% had someone living alone who was 65 years of age or older.

The 2020 census recorded 255,632 housing units, of which 3.9% were vacant. Among occupied housing units, 76.2% were owner-occupied and 23.8% were renter-occupied. The homeowner vacancy rate was 0.9% and the rental vacancy rate was 5.3%.

=== Racial and ethnic composition ===
Bucks County, Pennsylvania – Racial and ethnic composition Note: the US Census treats Hispanic/Latino as an ethnic category. This table excludes Latinos from the racial categories and assigns them to a separate category. Hispanics/Latinos may be of any race.
Race / Ethnicity (NH = Non-Hispanic)	Pop 1980	Pop 1990	Pop 2000	Pop 2010	Pop 2020	% 1980	% 1990	% 2000	% 2010	% 2020
White alone (NH)	456,946	508,282	544,733	543,207	521,575	95.35%	93.92%	91.15%	86.88%	80.67%
Black or African American alone (NH)	11,832	14,928	18,970	21,454	25,277	2.47%	2.76%	3.17%	3.43%	3.91%
Native American or Alaska Native alone (NH)	499	530	644	750	531	0.10%	0.10%	0.11%	0.12%	0.08%
Asian alone (NH)	3,572	8,262	13,545	23,893	35,053	0.75%	1.53%	2.27%	3.82%	5.42%
Native Hawaiian or Pacific Islander alone (NH)	x	x	141	138	143	x	x	0.02%	0.02%	0.02%
Other race alone (NH)	678	277	563	813	2,512	0.14%	0.05%	0.09%	0.13%	0.39%
Mixed race or Multiracial (NH)	x	x	5,034	8,212	21,677	x	x	0.84%	1.31%	3.35%
Hispanic or Latino (any race)	5,684	8,895	14,005	26,782	39,770	1.19%	1.64%	2.34%	4.28%	6.15%
Total	479,211	541,174	597,635	625,249	646,538	100.00%	100.00%	100.00%	100.00%	100.00%

=== 2010 census ===
As of the 2010 census, there were 625,249 people. The population density was 1,034.7 people per square mile. The racial makeup of the county was 86.6% Non-Hispanic white, 3.9% Black or African American, 0.3% Native American, 4.1% Asian (2.1% Indian, 1.1% Chinese, 0.7% Korean, 0.5% Filipino, 0.3% Vietnamese, 0.1% Japanese, 0.4% other Asian) 0.1% Pacific Islander, 1.7% were of two or more races, and 1.5% were of other races. 4.4% of the population were Hispanic or Latino of any race.

=== 2000 census ===
As of the 2000 census, there were 218,725 households, and 160,981 families residing in the county. There were 225,498 housing units at an average density of 371 per square mile (143/km^{2}). 20.1% were of German, 19.1% Irish, 14.0% Italian, 7.5% English and 5.9% Polish ancestry.

There were 218,725 households, out of which 35.30% had children under the age of 18 living with them, 61.20% were married couples living together, 8.80% had a female householder with no husband present, and 26.40% were non-families. 21.50% of all households were made up of individuals, and 8.10% had someone living alone who was 65 years of age or older. The average household size was 2.69 and the average family size was 3.17.

In the county, the population was spread out, with 25.70% under the age of 18, 7.00% from 18 to 24, 30.70% from 25 to 44, 24.30% from 45 to 64, and 12.40% who were 65 years of age or older. The median age was 38 years. For every 100 females there were 96.30 males. For every 100 females age 18 and over, there were 93.40 males.

The median income for a household in the county was $59,727, and the median income for a family was $68,727. Males had a median income of $46,587 versus $31,984 for females. The per capita income for the county was $27,430. About 3.10% of families and 4.50% of the population were below the poverty line, including 4.80% of those under age 18 and 5.50% of those age 65 or over.

=== Population growth ===
Growth began in the early 1950s, when William Levitt chose Bucks County for his second "Levittown". Levitt bought hundreds of acres of woodlands and farmland, and constructed 17,000 homes and dozens of schools, parks, libraries, and shopping centers. By the time the project was completed, the population of Levittown had swelled to nearly 74,000 residents. At the time, only whites could buy homes. This rule however, was soon overturned. Other planned developments included Croydon and Fairless Hills. This rapid sprawl continued until the mid-1960s.

In the 1970s, the county experienced a second growth spurt as developers expanded in previously underdeveloped townships, including Middletown, Lower Makefield, Northampton, and Newtown townships. Tract housing, office complexes, shopping centers, and sprawling parking lots continued to move more and more towards Upper Bucks, swallowing horse farms, sprawling forests, and wetlands. Oxford Valley Mall was constructed in Middletown, and became a retail nucleus in the county.

In the late 20th century, growth somewhat stabilized as development was completed in the county's historically underdeveloped areas, leaving little new area to be further developed.

Bucks County areas along the Delaware River have surpluses of abandoned industry, so many municipalities have granted building rights to luxury housing developers. As the regions that began the suburban boom in Bucks County, such as Levittown, have aged, commercial strips and other neglected structures have been torn down and replaced with new shopping plazas and commercial chains. With rising property values, areas with older construction are undergoing a renaissance, and Central and Upper Bucks have continued to experience rapid growth, with many municipalities doubling their populations since the late 20th century.

== Economy ==
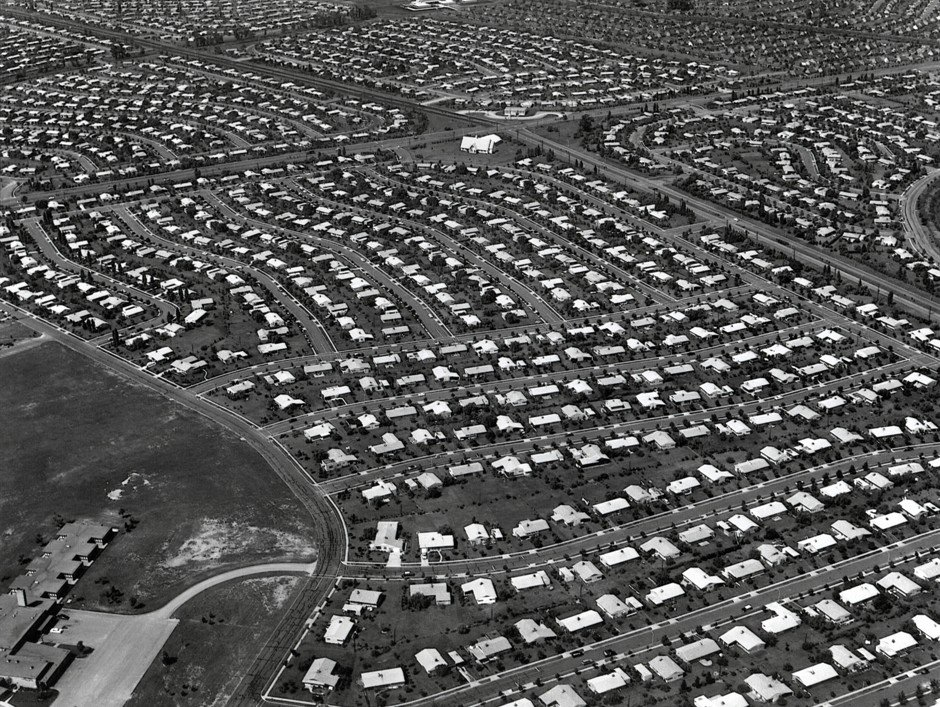
Aerial view of Levittown, c. 1959

The boroughs of Bristol and Morrisville were prominent industrial centers along the Northeast Corridor during World War II. Suburban development accelerated in Lower Bucks in the 1950s with the opening of Levittown, Pennsylvania, the second such "Levittown" designed by William Levitt.

Among Bucks' largest employers in the twentieth century were U.S. Steel in Falls Township, and the Vulcanized Rubber & Plastics and Robertson Tile companies in Morrisville. Rohm and Haas continues to operate several chemical plants around Bristol. Waste Management operates a landfill in Tullytown that is the largest receptacle of out-of-state waste in the US (receiving much of New York City's waste following the closure of Fresh Kills landfill in Staten Island, New York 40 miles (64 km) away).

Bucks is also experiencing rapid growth in biotechnology, along with neighboring Montgomery County. The Greater Philadelphia area consistently ranks in the top 10 geographic clusters for biotechnology and biopharma. It was projected that by 2020, one out of four people in Bucks County would work in biotechnology.

=== Notable businesses ===
- 21st Century Media
- Burpee Seeds and Plants
- Byers' Choice Ltd.
- Carson Helicopters
- Charming Shoppes
- eGames, Inc.
- GE Betz
- Keystone Aircraft
- Lehigh Defense
- McCaffrey's Food Markets
- Moon Nurseries
- New Hope and Ivyland Railroad
- Questar Corporation
- Rita's Italian Ice
- V. La Rosa and Sons Macaroni Company
- West Coast Video
- Windowizards

=== Tourism ===
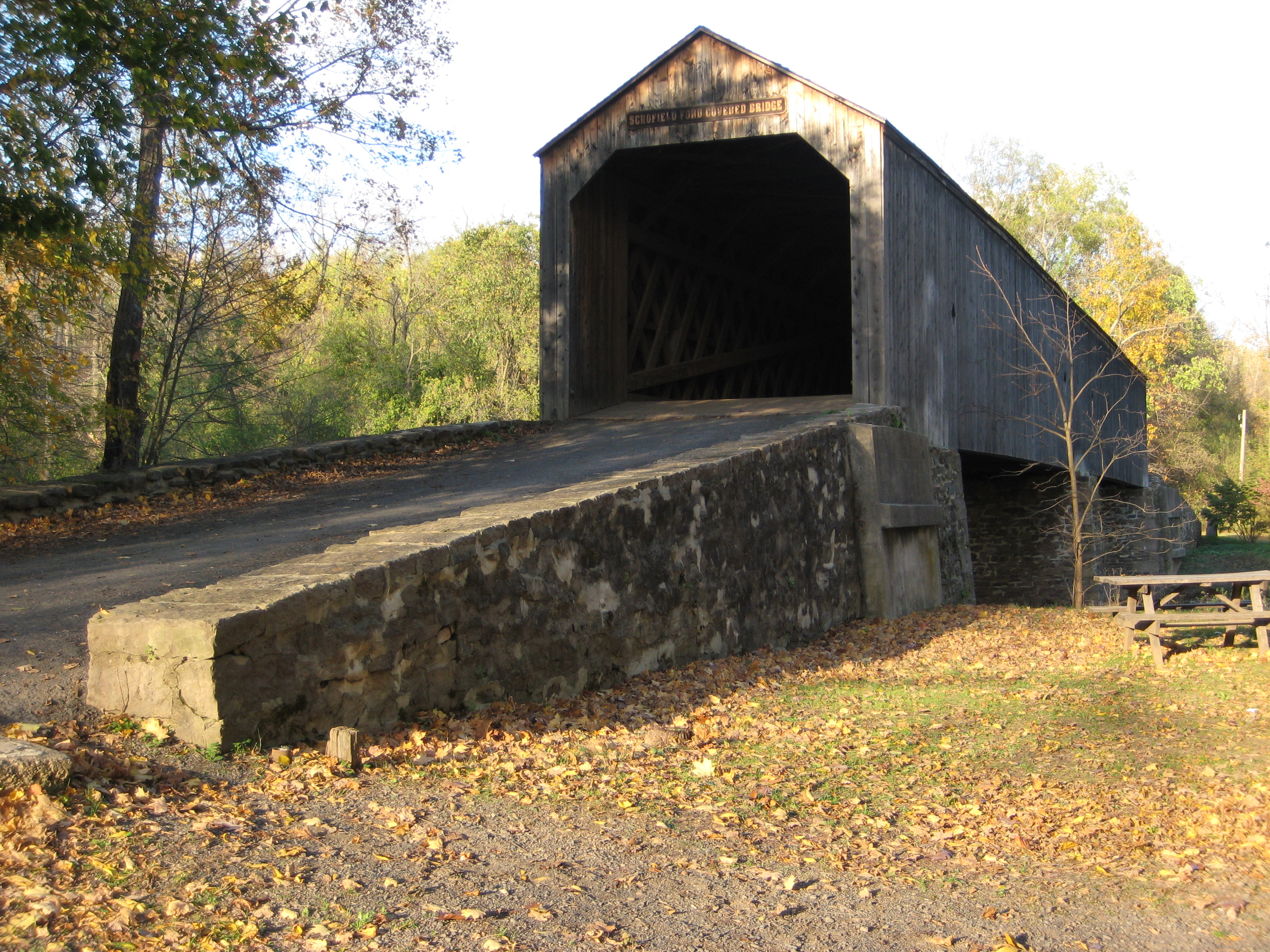
Schofield Ford Covered Bridge over Neshaminy Creek in Tyler State Park. Bucks County has 12 covered bridges, ten of which are still open to highway traffic, and two of which are located in parks and open to non-vehicular traffic.

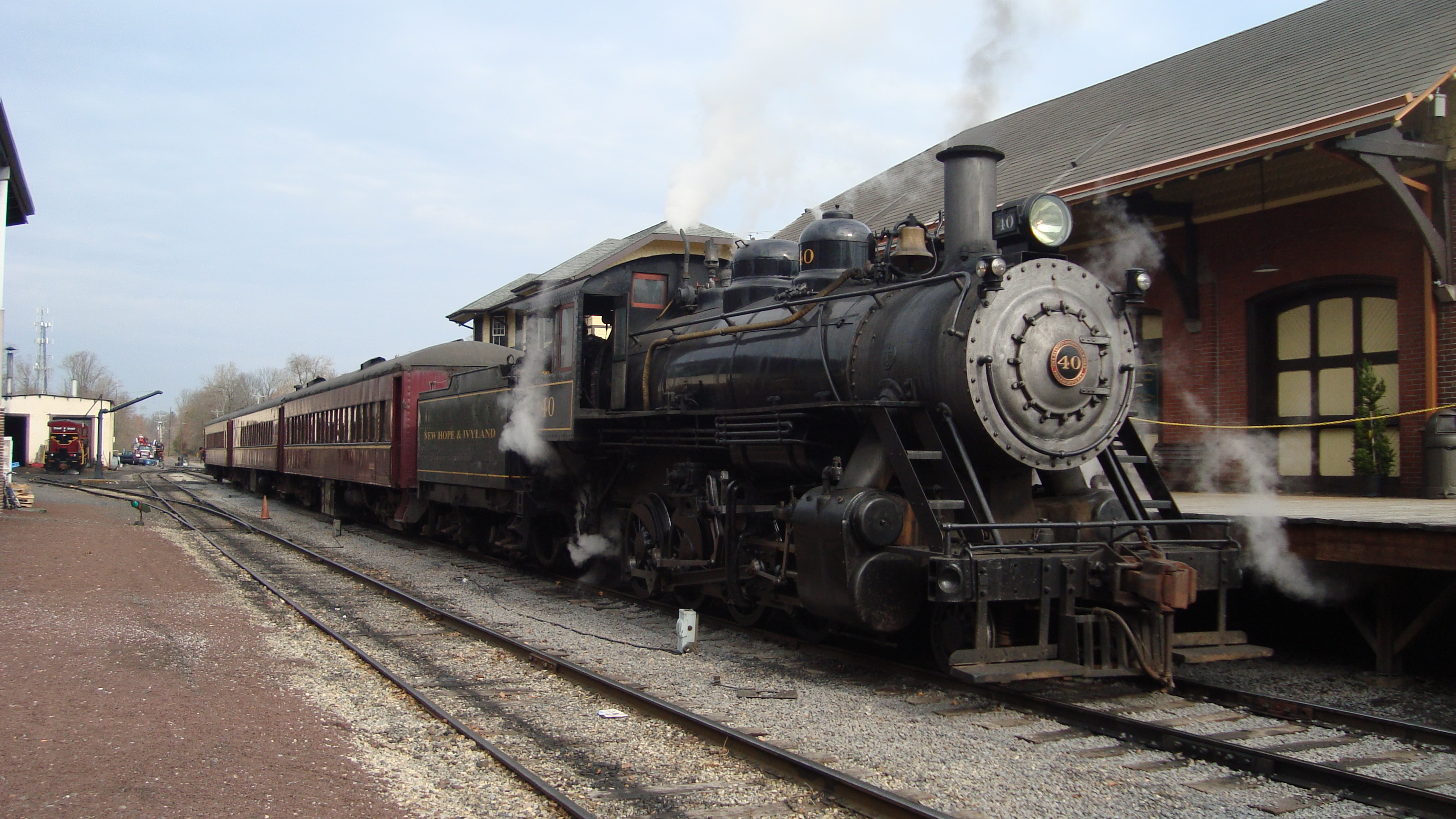
New Hope Railroad in New Hope

The county's northern regions, colloquially referred to as Upper Bucks, are known for their natural scenery, farmland, colonial history, and proximity to major urban areas, including Philadelphia, New York City, Allentown, Reading, and Atlantic City, each of which is within a two-hour driving radius.

Bucks County is home to twelve covered bridges. Ten are still open to vehicular traffic; two others, located in parks, are open only to non-vehicular traffic. All Bucks County bridges use the Town truss design. Schofield Ford Bridge, in Tyler State Park, was reconstructed in 1997 from the ground up after arsonists destroyed the original in 1991.

Popular attractions in Bucks County include the shops and studios of New Hope, Peddler's Village (in Lahaska), Washington Crossing Historic Park, New Hope Railroad, Bucks County River Country and Bucks County Playhouse Theater (in New Hope). Rice's Market near Lahaska is a popular destination on Tuesday mornings. Quakertown Farmer's Market (locally called "Q-Mart") is a popular shopping destination on weekends. The county seat of Doylestown has the trifecta of concrete structures built by Henry Chapman Mercer, including the Moravian Pottery and Tile Works, the Mercer Museum and Fonthill, Mercer's personal home.

Southern Bucks, colloquially referred to as Lower Bucks, is home to two important shopping malls, Neshaminy Mall, Oxford Valley Mall, and Sesame Place, a family theme park based on the Sesame Street television series. Also within Lower Bucks County is Parx Casino and Racing in Bensalem, a casino and thoroughbred horse racing track. The casino was built on the grounds of what was originally Philadelphia Park Racetrack. The complex includes the thoroughbred horse racing track, expansive casino, a dance club, numerous dining options, and the Xcite Center.

== Education ==
=== Colleges and universities ===
- Bucks County Community College
- Delaware Valley University in Doylestown
- Cairn University in Langhorne Manor
- Holy Family University in Newtown
- La Salle University in Newtown
- Strayer University in Trevose

=== Public school districts ===
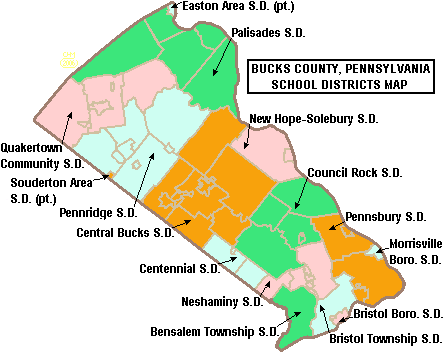
Map of Bucks County public school districts

K-12 school districts include:

- Bensalem Township School District
- Bristol Borough School District
- Bristol Township School District
- Centennial School District
- Central Bucks School District
- Council Rock School District
- Morrisville Borough School District
- Neshaminy School District
- New Hope-Solebury School District
- North Penn School District (also in Montgomery County)
- Palisades School District
- Pennridge School District
- Pennsbury School District
- Quakertown Community School District
- Souderton Area School District (also in Montgomery County)

The Bucks County public schools listed above are served by a regional educational service agency called the Bucks County Intermediate Unit #22 located in the county seat of Doylestown.

Previously, the Easton Area School District included Riegelsville in Bucks County. In 2012 the Pennsylvania Department of Education approved moving Riegelsville into the Palisades School District, and this was to be effective 2013.

=== Public charter schools ===
- Bucks County Montessori Charter School
- Center Student Learning Charter School
- School Lane Charter School

=== Private schools ===
- 27 Catholic grade schools under jurisdiction of the Archdiocese of Philadelphia
- Abrams Hebrew Academy (K–8)
- Archbishop Wood Catholic High School
- Calvary Christian School
- Conwell–Egan Catholic High School
- George School
- Holy Family Regional Catholic School
- Holy Ghost Preparatory School (9–12 for boys)
- Newtown Friends School (PreK-8)
- The Pen Ryn School
- Plumstead Christian School
- Quakertown Christian School
- Solebury School
- St. Katherine Drexel
- St. Michael the Archangel
- Trevose Day School
- United Friends School Quakertown
- Villa Joseph Marie High School (9–12 for girls)

=== Community, junior, and technical colleges ===
- Bucks County Community College
- Bucks County School of Beauty Culture
- Bucks County Technical High School
- Cairn University
- CHI Institute
- Delaware Valley University
- Holy Family University
- Middle Bucks Institute of Technology
- Pennco Tech

== Libraries ==
The Bucks County Library System was founded in 1956 by a resolution of the Bucks County Commissioners.

The Bucks County Library System is made up of seven branch libraries:

- Bensalem
- Doylestown
- Langhorne
- Levittown
- Perkasie
- Quakertown
- Yardley-Makefield

There are also eleven independent public libraries:

- Fallsington Library
- Free Library of New Hope & Solebury
- Free Library of Northampton Township
- Margaret R. Grundy Memorial Library
- Morrisville Free Library
- Pipersville Free Library
- Riegelsville Public Library
- Southampton Free Library
- Township Library of Lower Southampton
- Village Library of Wrightstown
- Warminster Township Free Library

== Arts and culture ==
=== Fine and performing arts ===
Many artists and writers based in New York City have called Bucks County home, settling mainly in the small stretch between Doylestown and New Hope and along the Delaware River.

The county boasts many local theater companies, including the long-established and recently reopened Bucks County Playhouse in New Hope, Town and Country Players in Buckingham, ActorsNET in Morrisville, and the Bristol Riverside Theatre, a professional Equity theater in Bristol. The Bucks County Symphony, founded in 1953, performs in Doylestown throughout the year and the Bucks County Gilbert & Sullivan Society, founded in 2009, performs a Gilbert & Sullivan operetta with full orchestra each June.

The Wild River Review, an online magazine that publishes in-depth reporting, works of literature, art, visual art, reviews, interviews, and columns by and about contemporary artists, photographers, and writers, is based out of Doylestown.

=== Film ===
- The 2002 film Signs was primarily filmed in Bucks County, with the scenes of the house and cornfield shot at Delaware Valley University in Doylestown. Other locations within Bucks County included Newtown for the bookstore and pizza shop scenes, and Morrisville for the pharmacy scene.
- The 2012 film Safe, starring Jason Statham, was filmed at the Parx Casino and Racing in Bensalem Township.
- The 2010 NBC pilot episode for Outlaw was filmed in the Andalusia section of Bensalem Township.

== Media ==
Local print publications include Bucks County Courier Times, The Intelligencer, The Advance of Bucks County, Bucks County Herald, Bucks County Town and Country Living, Radius Magazine, Yardley Voice, Morrisville Times, Newtown Gazette, Northampton Herald, Langhorne Ledger, Lower Southampton Spirit, New Hope News, Doylestown Observer, Warwick Journal, Fairless Focus. Online news publications include Levittown Now, Bucks County Beacon, NewtownPANow, Bucks Happening, and New Hope Free Press.

WBCB is a local radio news station.

== Sports ==
=== Rugby league ===
The Bucks County Sharks rugby league team played in the AMNRL from 1997 to 2010. They returned to play in the AMNRL in 2011, until the league's fold in 2014, when they subsequently joined the USARL.

=== Little League ===
The county has a considerable history of producing Little League baseball contenders. Since its inception in 1947, four of the seven Pennsylvania teams to compete in the Little League World Series in Williamsport, Pennsylvania have come from Bucks County: Morrisville (1955), Levittown American (1960 and 1961), and Council Rock-Newtown (2005). Two of these squads, Morrisville and Levittown (1960), went on to win the World Series title. In 2007, Council Rock Northampton won the PA State championship, and lost in the finals of regionals.

=== PIAA ===
The county is a part of PIAA's District I, and has seen many schools capture multiple state titles.

=== American Legion baseball ===
In 1996, Yardley Western Post 317 won the American Legion National Championship.

Bristol Legion Post 382 won the 2011 American Legion State Championship.

=== Horse racing ===
Parx Casino and Racing, formerly Philadelphia Park Racetrack and Keystone Racetrack, the former home of Triple Crown contender Smarty Jones, is in Bensalem.

== Parks and recreation ==
=== Pennsylvania state parks ===
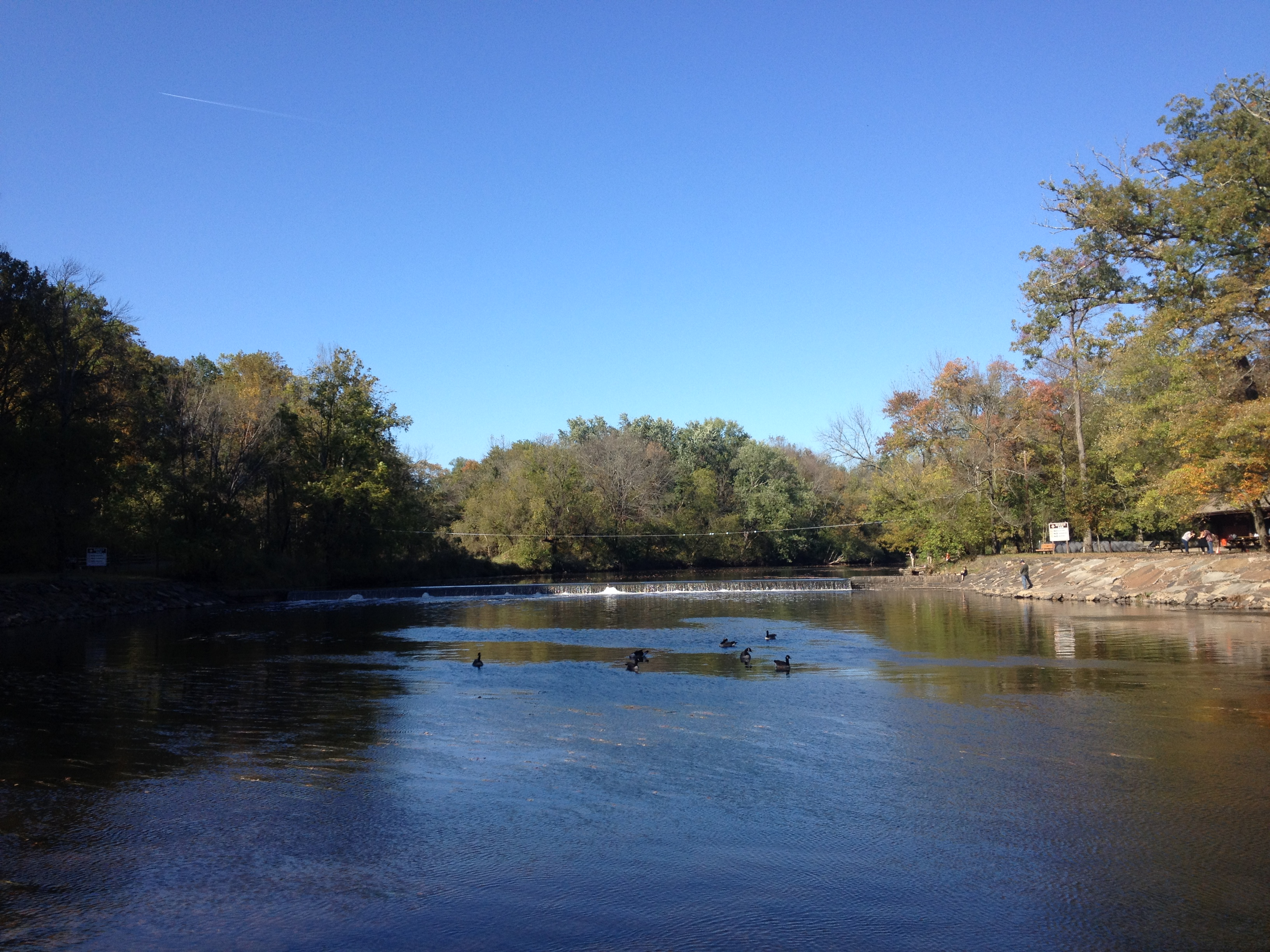
Neshaminy Creek in Tyler State Park

There are six Commonwealth-owned parks in Bucks County:

- Five are owned and operated by the Pennsylvania Bureau of State Parks, part of the Pennsylvania Department of Conservation and Natural Resources (DCNR).
  - Delaware Canal State Park
  - Neshaminy State Park
  - Nockamixon State Park
  - Ralph Stover State Park
  - Tyler State Park
- Bucks County Parks and Recreation operates an 18-bed youth hostel in the Nockamixon State Park Weisel estate. The hostel is part of Hostelling International USA.
- Washington Crossing Historic Park, a 500 acres (200 ha) site operated by the Pennsylvania Historical and Museum Commission, is part of Washington's Crossing, a U.S. National Historic Landmark area. The park is headquartered in the village of Washington Crossing located in Upper Makefield Township. It marks the location of George Washington's crossing of the Delaware River during the American Revolutionary War.

=== County parks ===
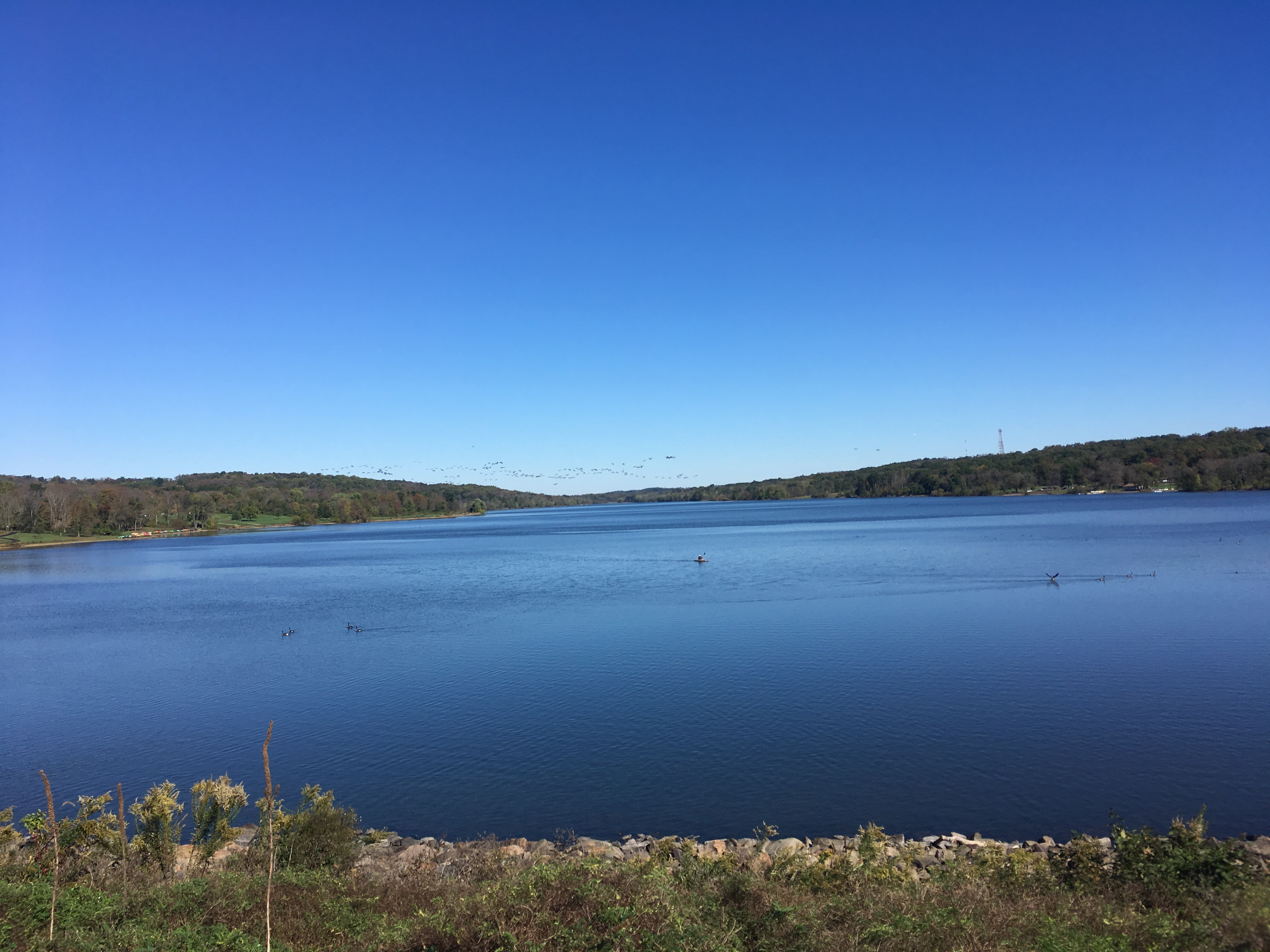
Lake Galena in Peace Valley Park

- Bucks County Horse Park
- Core Creek Park
- Dark Hollow Park
- Lake Towhee Park
- Peace Valley Park
- Playwicki Park
- Ringing Rocks Park
- Silver Lake Park
- Tinicum Park
- Tohickon Valley Park

=== Historic properties ===
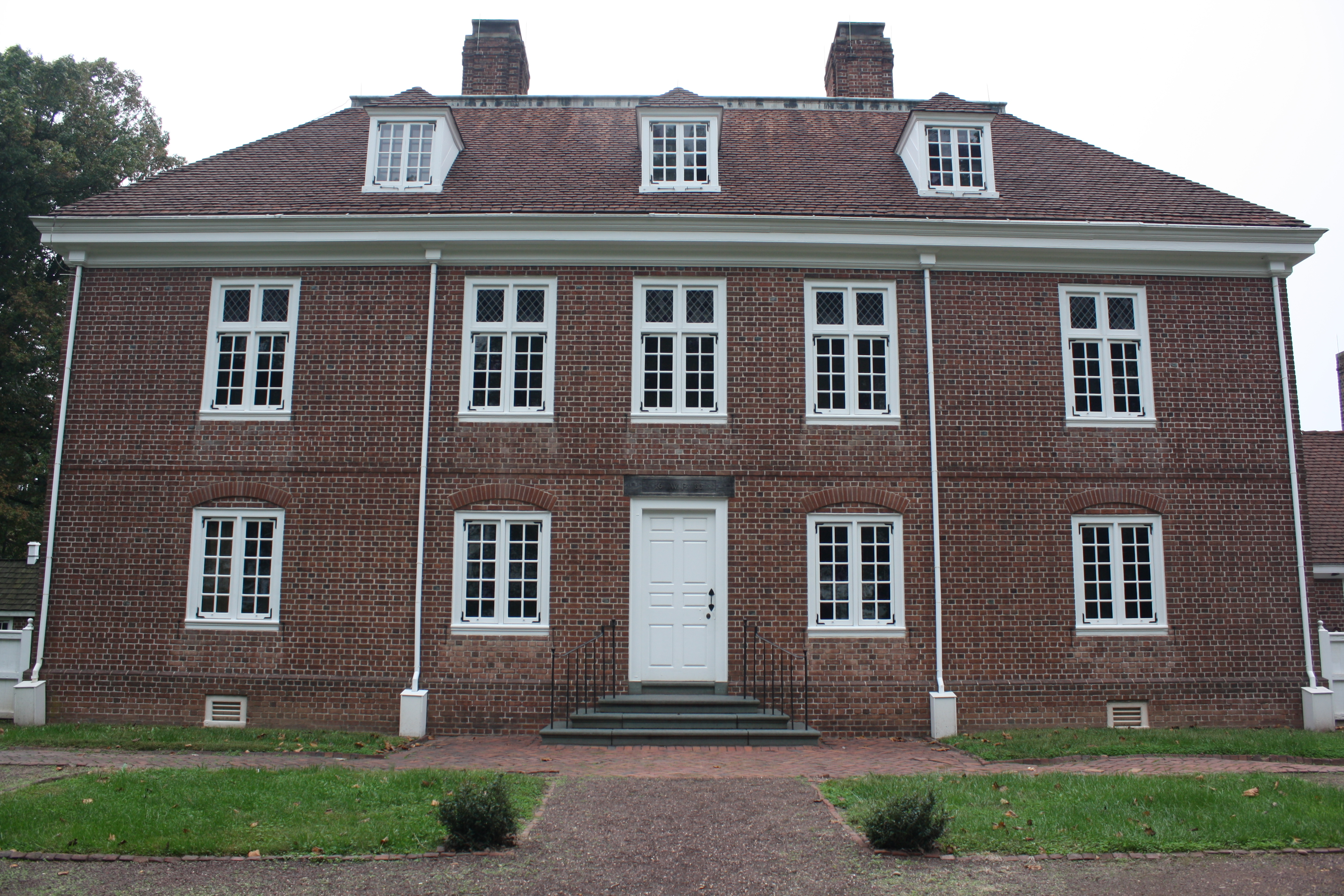
Pennsbury Manor in Falls Township

- Stover-Myers Mill and Erwin Stover House
- Moland House an old stone farmhouse built around 1750 located in Warwick Township, served as the headquarters for General George Washington during the American Revolutionary War from August 10, 1777, until August 23, 1777.
- Summerseat, also known as the George Clymer House and Thomas Barclay House, is a historic house museum in Morrisville, built about 1765. It is the only house known to have been owned by two signers of the Declaration of Independence, George Clymer and Robert Morris, and as a headquarters of General George Washington from December 8 to 14, 1776, prior to Washington's attack in the Battle of Trenton.
- Pennsbury Manor house and grounds, the home of William Penn, founder and first Governor of Pennsylvania, administered by the Pennsylvania Historical and Museum Commission in association with the Pennsbury Society and are open to the public.
- African American Museum of Bucks County

=== County recreation sites ===
- Core Creek Boat Rental
- Core Creek Tennis Center
- Frosty Hollow Tennis Center
- Oxford Valley Golf Course
- Oxford Valley Pool
- Peace Valley Boat Rental
- Tohickon Valley Pool
- Weisel Hostel

=== County nature centers ===
- Bucks County Audubon Society's Honey Hollow Environmental Education Center
- Churchville Nature Center
- Clark Nature Center
- Peace Valley Nature Center
- Silver Lake Nature Center

== Transportation ==
=== Airports ===
Air transportation facilities available in or close to Bucks County include:

- Doylestown Airport
- Pennridge Airport
- Philadelphia International Airport
- Quakertown Airport
- Sterling Aviation Heliport in Croydon next to Neshaminy State Park
- Trenton-Mercer Airport
- Van Sant Airport and Park

=== Public transportation ===
- Amtrak's Northeast Corridor line, which runs in southern Bucks County. Its Keystone Service trains run daily, stopping at the Cornwells Heights station in Bensalem Township
- Bucks County Transport, a paratransit and ridesharing service
  - Doylestown Dart provides public transportation around the Doylestown area
- SEPTA
  - City Division and Suburban Division bus routes across southeastern Bucks County
- Regional Rail's Lansdale/Doylestown, Trenton, Warminster and West Trenton lines
- TMA Bucks's Rushbus, which runs in parts of southern and central Bucks County

=== Major roads and highways ===
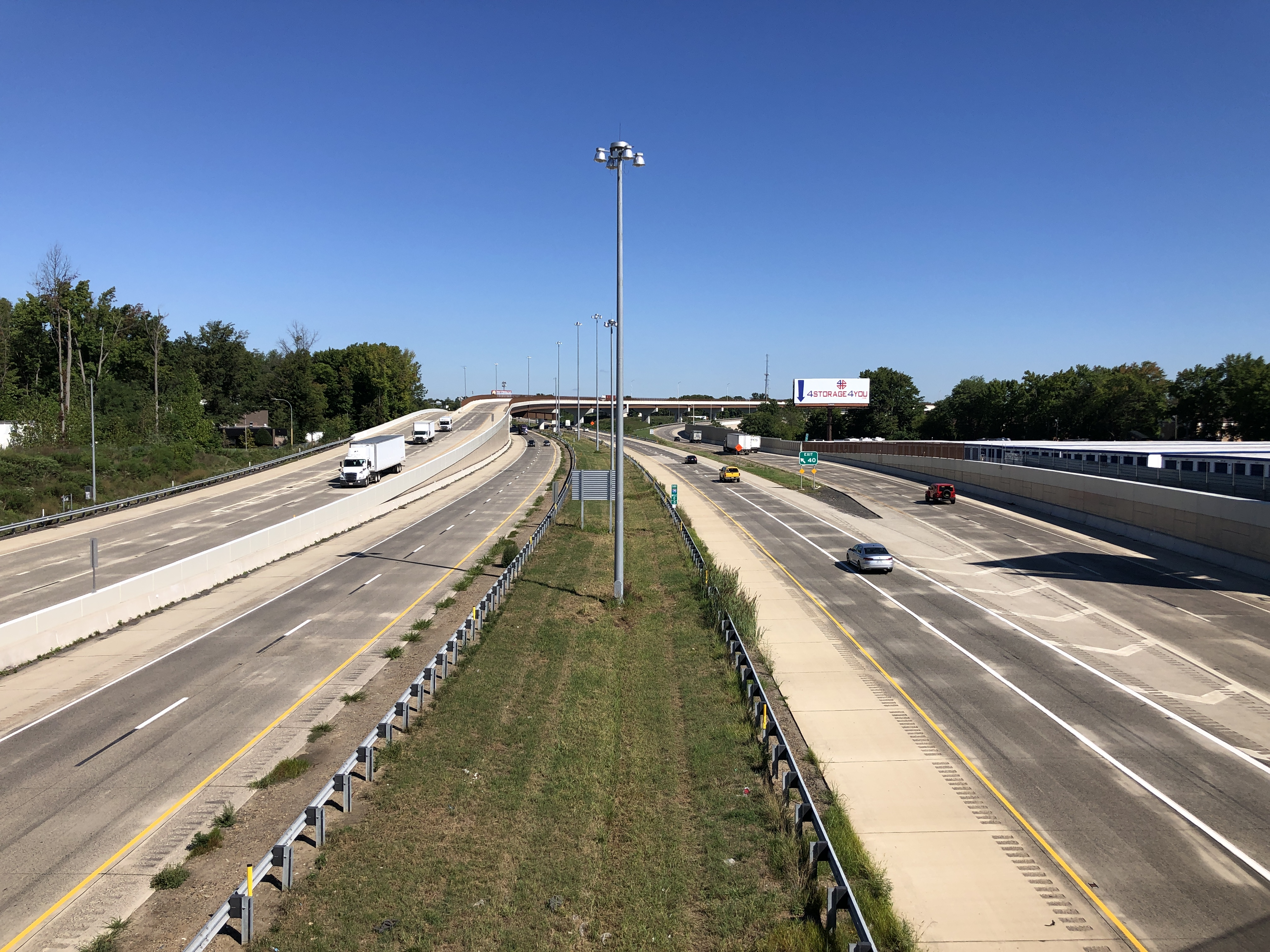
I-95 northbound at its interchange with I-295 and I-276/Pennsylvania Turnpike in Bucks County

- I-95
- I-276 / Penna Turnpike
- I-295
- I-476 / Penna Turnpike NE Extension
- US 1
- US 1 Bus.
- US 13
- US 202
- US 202 Bus.
- PA 32
- PA 63
- PA 113
- PA 132
- PA 152
- PA 179
- PA 212
- PA 213
- PA 232
- PA 263
- PA 309
- PA 313
- PA 332
- PA 412
- PA 413
- PA 513
- PA 532
- PA 563
- PA 611
- PA 663

== Politics and government ==
United States presidential election results for Bucks County, Pennsylvania
Year	Republican		Democratic		Third party(ies)	
Year	No.	%	No.	%	No.	%
1880	8,385	49.19%	8,627	50.61%	35	0.21%
1884	8,191	48.47%	8,604	50.92%	103	0.61%
1888	8,584	49.11%	8,642	49.44%	253	1.45%
1892	8,230	48.72%	8,390	49.67%	272	1.61%
1896	9,798	57.61%	6,685	39.31%	524	3.08%
1900	9,263	55.13%	7,287	43.37%	253	1.51%
1904	9,572	57.73%	6,719	40.52%	290	1.75%
1908	9,409	55.33%	7,233	42.54%	362	2.13%
1912	5,452	32.00%	6,773	39.75%	4,812	28.24%
1916	9,269	53.97%	7,491	43.62%	414	2.41%
1920	14,130	65.17%	6,867	31.67%	684	3.15%
1924	17,460	66.88%	6,582	25.21%	2,066	7.91%
1928	28,421	76.47%	8,446	22.72%	301	0.81%
1932	22,331	59.07%	14,135	37.39%	1,341	3.55%
1936	23,860	48.80%	24,159	49.41%	876	1.79%
1940	25,169	54.73%	20,586	44.77%	229	0.50%
1944	25,634	58.62%	17,823	40.76%	270	0.62%
1948	29,411	62.46%	16,655	35.37%	1,018	2.16%
1952	40,753	62.38%	24,301	37.20%	275	0.42%
1956	59,862	60.72%	38,541	39.09%	180	0.18%
1960	67,501	53.95%	57,177	45.70%	438	0.35%
1964	50,243	38.89%	78,287	60.60%	646	0.50%
1968	69,646	48.63%	57,634	40.24%	15,931	11.12%
1972	99,684	62.28%	56,784	35.48%	3,591	2.24%
1976	85,628	50.69%	79,838	47.26%	3,457	2.05%
1980	100,536	55.49%	59,120	32.63%	21,508	11.87%
1984	130,119	63.25%	74,568	36.25%	1,032	0.50%
1988	127,563	59.99%	82,472	38.78%	2,605	1.23%
1992	94,584	38.06%	97,902	39.40%	56,021	22.54%
1996	94,899	41.74%	103,313	45.44%	29,151	12.82%
2000	121,927	46.29%	132,914	50.46%	8,581	3.26%
2004	154,469	48.30%	163,438	51.10%	1,909	0.60%
2008	150,248	45.08%	179,031	53.71%	4,045	1.21%
2012	156,579	48.74%	160,521	49.97%	4,166	1.30%
2016	164,361	47.64%	167,060	48.42%	13,621	3.95%
2020	187,367	47.16%	204,712	51.53%	5,212	1.31%
2024	198,722	49.39%	198,431	49.32%	5,196	1.29%

United States Senate election results for Bucks County, Pennsylvania1
Year	Republican		Democratic		Third party(ies)	
Year	No.	%	No.	%	No.	%
1994	84,741	52.35%	66,381	41.01%	10,759	6.65%
2000	144,711	57.09%	103,961	41.01%	4,814	1.90%
2006	96,441	41.48%	136,063	58.52%	0	0.00%
2012	146,918	47.00%	161,373	51.62%	4,297	1.37%
2018	124,133	42.18%	165,408	56.20%	4,776	1.62%
2024	194,203	48.57%	196,444	49.13%	9,186	2.30%

United States Senate election results for Bucks County, Pennsylvania3
Year	Republican		Democratic		Third party(ies)	
Year	No.	%	No.	%	No.	%
1992	121,763	50.72%	109,859	45.77%	8,428	3.51%
1998	91,809	65.07%	42,976	30.46%	6,299	4.46%
2004	175,020	56.49%	126,064	40.69%	8,741	2.82%
2010	121,331	53.09%	107,208	46.91%	0	0.00%
2016	175,898	51.82%	157,709	46.46%	5,845	1.72%
2022	141,340	44.97%	164,536	52.35%	8,435	2.68%

Pennsylvania Gubernatorial election results for Bucks County
Year	Republican		Democratic		Third party(ies)	
Year	No.	%	No.	%	No.	%
1970	46,202	41.62%	58,580	52.77%	6,232	5.61%
1974	51,740	43.88%	63,768	54.08%	2,402	2.04%
1978	74,446	57.65%	53,394	41.35%	1,287	1.00%
1982	93,023	61.52%	57,019	37.71%	1,161	0.77%
1986	83,492	59.32%	55,729	39.59%	1,532	1.09%
1990	57,783	41.42%	81,715	58.58%	0	0.00%
1994	87,327	52.51%	55,180	33.18%	23,795	14.31%
1998	93,697	64.85%	39,210	27.14%	11,576	8.01%
2002	70,000	34.64%	127,850	63.28%	4,201	2.08%
2006	69,798	29.89%	163,739	70.11%	0	0.00%
2010	126,190	55.27%	102,144	44.73%	0	0.00%
2014	94,584	47.67%	103,812	52.33%	0	0.00%
2018	117,912	40.06%	172,302	58.54%	4,115	1.40%
2022	122,982	39.16%	185,339	59.02%	5,720	1.82%

Like most of the Philadelphia suburbs, Bucks County was once a stronghold for the Republican Party. However, in recent years it has become more of a swing county, like Pennsylvania at large.

In presidential elections, Bucks County has been caught up in the overall Democratic trend that has swept the Philadelphia area, although the trend in Bucks has been less pronounced than in Delaware and Montgomery counties. It went Democratic in every presidential election from 1992 to 2020, though by a margin of less than 5% in each except for 2008, with three of those eight elections decided by less than 2% (1992, 2012, and 2016). In 2024, Donald Trump flipped the county with a victory margin of 0.07% or 291 votes. Prior to this Republicans won the county all but thrice between 1896 and 1988 (except in 1912, 1936, and 1964). Unlike most other suburban Philadelphia counties, Bucks County consistently voted Democratic during the Civil War era, only voting Republican twice between 1856 and 1892, in 1860 and 1872.

The executive government is run by a three-seat board of commissioners, one member of which serves as chairperson. Commissioners are elected through at-large voting and serve four-year terms. In cases of vacancy, a panel of county judges appoints members to fill seats. The current commissioners are Diane M. Ellis-Marseglia (D) (chairwoman), Robert "Bob" J. Harvie Jr. (D) (Vice-chairman), and Gene DiGirolamo (R). The current terms expire in January 2028. In 2012, four county employees were sentenced for compensating public employees for political work on behalf of Republican candidates.

Bucks County is represented in the U.S. Congress by Pennsylvania's 1st congressional district, formerly numbered as the 8th District. The district is represented by Brian Fitzpatrick (R), making this district one of 18 nationwide to be held by a Republican and won by Joe Biden in 2020.

In the 2016 elections, Democrats Hillary Clinton (president), Josh Shapiro (attorney general), and Joe Torsella (state treasurer) won Bucks County, while Republicans Pat Toomey (U.S. senator), Brian Fitzpatrick (U.S. representative), and John Brown (auditor general) won Bucks County in their respective races.

The 2024 elections were mired in controversy in Bucks County, culminating in widespread condemnation of Bucks County Commissioner Diane Ellis-Marseglia (D), who was filmed on video stating that the "rule of law doesn't matter anymore in this country" in the context of a decision made by the county's Board of Elections to violate the PA State Supreme Court's ruling regarding which provisional ballots can and cannot be counted.

In the early 2020s, school board elections in Bucks County became increasingly politicized amid ongoing culture-war debates over education policy. In recent elections, Democratic candidates made significant gains, reclaiming control of several school boards after sweeping Republican victories in 2021 that had led to controversial conservative policies.

=== Voter registration ===
Voter registration
1. Republican (42.2%)
2. Democratic (40.1%)
3. Independent (13.6%)
4. Other parties (4.03%)

As of October 31, 2025, there were 481,537 registered voters in Bucks County.

- Republican: 202,815 (42.15%)
- Democratic: 192,609 (40.00%)
- Independent: 67,093 (13.92%)
- Third party: 19,020 (3.93%)

=== County commissioners ===
- Robert J. Harvie Jr., chair, Democratic
- Diane M. Ellis-Marseglia, vice chair, Democratic
- Gene DiGirolamo, Republican

=== County row officers ===
Office	Official	Party	Term ends
Clerk of Courts	Eileen Hartnett Albillar	Democratic	2027
Controller	Neale Dougherty	Democratic	2029
Coroner	Patti Campi	Democratic	2027
Treasurer	Kris Ballerini	Democratic	2027
District attorney	Joe Khan	Democratic	2029
Prothonotary	Donna Petrecco	Democratic	2029
Recorder of deeds	Robin Robinson	Democratic	2029
Register of wills	Linda Bobrin	Democratic	2027
Sheriff	Danny Ceisler	Democratic	2029

=== Law enforcement ===
The current Bucks County sheriff is Danny Ceisler.

Three members of the Sheriff's Office have died in the line of duty. One was shot and two others died in traffic accidents. The first, Sheriff Abram Kulp, was murdered in February 1927.

=== State senate ===
District	Senator	Party
6	Frank Farry	Republican
10	Steve Santarsiero	Democratic
16	Jarrett Coleman	Republican

=== State House of Representatives ===
District	Representative	Party
18	Kathleen C. Tomlinson	Republican
29	Tim Brennan	Democratic
31	Perry Warren	Democratic
140	Jim Prokopiak	Democratic
141	Tina Davis	Democratic
142	Joe Hogan	Republican
143	Shelby Labs	Republican
144	Brian Munroe	Democratic
145	Craig Staats	Republican
178	Kristin Marcell	Republican

=== United States House of Representatives ===
District	Representative	Party
1	Brian Fitzpatrick	Republican

=== United States Senate ===
Senator	Party
Dave McCormick	Republican
John Fetterman	Democratic

== Communities ==
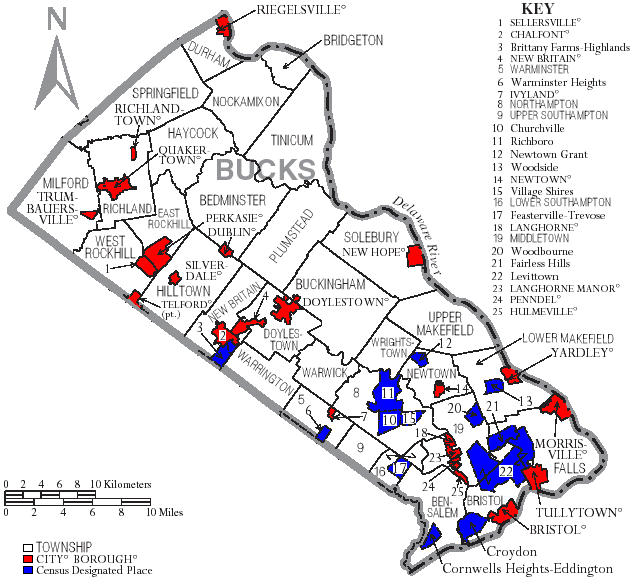
Map of Bucks County, Pennsylvania with municipal labels showing boroughs (in red), townships (in white), and census-designated places (in blue)

Under Pennsylvania law, there are four types of incorporated municipalities: cities, boroughs, townships, and, in at most two cases, towns. The following boroughs and townships are located in Bucks County:

=== Boroughs ===
- Bristol
- Chalfont
- Doylestown (county seat)
- Dublin
- Hulmeville
- Ivyland
- Langhorne
- Langhorne Manor
- Morrisville
- New Britain
- New Hope
- Newtown
- Penndel
- Perkasie
- Quakertown
- Richlandtown
- Riegelsville
- Sellersville
- Silverdale
- Telford (lies partly in Montgomery County)
- Trumbauersville
- Tullytown
- Yardley

=== Townships ===
- Bedminster
- Bensalem
- Bridgeton
- Bristol
- Buckingham
- Doylestown
- Durham
- East Rockhill
- Falls
- Haycock
- Hilltown
- Lower Makefield
- Lower Southampton
- Middletown
- Milford
- New Britain
- Newtown
- Nockamixon
- Northampton
- Plumstead
- Richland
- Solebury
- Springfield
- Tinicum
- Upper Makefield
- Upper Southampton
- Warminster
- Warrington
- Warwick
- West Rockhill
- Wrightstown

=== Census-designated places ===
Census-designated places are geographical areas designated by the U.S. Census Bureau for the purposes of compiling demographic data. They are not actual jurisdictions under Pennsylvania law. Other unincorporated communities, such as villages, may be listed here as well.

- Brittany Farms-The Highlands
- Churchville
- Cornwells Heights
- Croydon
- Eddington
- Fairless Hills
- Feasterville
- Levittown
- Milford Square
- Newtown Grant
- Plumsteadville
- Richboro
- Spinnerstown
- Trevose
- Village Shires
- Warminster Heights
- Woodbourne
- Woodside

=== Unincorporated communities ===
- Almont
- Andalusia
- Applebachsville
- Aquetong
- Argus
- Bedminster
- Blooming Glen
- Brick Tavern
- Bryn Gweled
- Buckingham
- Bucksville
- California
- Carversville
- Center Bridge
- Danboro
- Dolington
- Durham
- Elephant
- Erwinna
- Eureka
- Fallsington
- Ferndale
- Finland
- Forest Grove
- Fountainville
- Furlong
- Gallows Hill
- Gardenville
- Geryville‡
- Hagersville
- Harriman
- Harrow
- Hartsville
- Highton
- Hillside Village
- Hilltop
- Hilltown
- Hinkletown
- Holicong
- Holland
- Hood
- Jamison
- Johnsville
- Kintnersville
- Kulps Corner
- Lahaska
- Line Lexington‡
- Lodi
- Loux Corner (Hilltown)
- Lumberville
- Maple Beach
- Mechanicsville
- Mount Pleasant
- Neshaminy Falls
- Newville
- Oakford
- Ottsville
- Oxford Valley
- Paletown
- Passer
- Penns Park
- Pineville
- Pipersville
- Pleasant Valley
- Point Pleasant
- Revere
- Rushland
- Shelly
- Solebury
- Southampton
- Springtown
- Strawntown
- Uhlerstown
- Unionville‡
- Upper Black Eddy
- Washington Crossing
- White Horse
- Wrightstown
- Wycombe
- Zionhill

‡This populated place also has portions in an adjacent county or counties.

=== Historic communities ===
- New Galena, located under modern Lake Galena
- Tohickon, located under modern Lake Nockamixon

=== Population ranking ===
The population ranking of the following table is based on the 2020 census of Bucks County.

† county seat

Rank	City/Town/etc.	Municipal type	Population (2020 Census)
1	Bensalem	Township	62,707
2	Bristol	Township	54,291
3	Levittown	CDP	52,699
4	Middletown	Township	46,040
5	Northampton	Township	39,915
6	Falls	Township	34,716
7	Warminster	Township	33,603
8	Lower Makefield	Township	33,180
9	Warrington	Township	25,639
10	Buckingham	Township	20,851
11	Lower Southampton	Township	20,599
12	Newtown	Township	19,895
13	Doylestown	Township	17,971
14	Hilltown	Township	16,284
15	Upper Southampton	Township	15,269
16	Warwick	Township	14,851
17	Plumstead	Township	14,012
18	Richland	Township	13,837
19	New Britain	Township	12,327
20	Milford	Township	10,243
21	Croydon	CDP	10,014
22	Bristol	Borough	9,861
23	Morrisville	Borough	9,809
24	Quakertown	Borough	9,359
25	Perkasie	Borough	9,120
26	Fairless Hills	CDP	9,046
27	Upper Makefield	Township	8,857
28	Solebury	Township	8,709
29	† Doylestown	Borough	8,300
30	Bedminster	Township	7,541
31	Richboro	CDP	6,378
32	Newtown Grant	CDP	5,855
33	East Rockhill	Township	5,819
34	West Rockhill	Township	5,439
35	Churchville	CDP	5,348
36	Springfield	Township	5,175
37	Telford (lies partially in Montgomery County)	Borough	4,928
38	Sellersville	Borough	4,567
39	Chalfont	Borough	4,253
40	Village Shires	CDP	3,946
41	Tinicum	Township	3,818
42	Warminster Heights	CDP	3,726
43	Brittany Farms-The Highlands	CDP	3,695
44	Trevose	CDP	3,460
45	Nockamixon	Township	3,379
46	Woodbourne	CDP	3,301
47	Wrightstown	Township	3,286
48	Woodside	CDP	3,133
49	Feasterville	CDP	3,066
50	New Britain	Borough	2,836
51	New Hope	Borough	2,612
52	Yardley	Borough	2,605
53	Plumsteadville	CDP	2,553
54	Penndel	Borough	2,515
55	Tullytown	Borough	2,282
56	Newtown	Borough	2,268
57	Haycock	Township	2,200
58	Dublin	Borough	2,177
59	Eddington	CDP	1,996
60	Spinnerstown	CDP	1,671
61	Langhorne	Borough	1,643
62	Langhorne Manor	Borough	1,496
63	Richlandtown	Borough	1,260
64	Cornwells Heights	CDP	1,251
65	Bridgeton	Township	1,234
66	Milford Square	CDP	1,137
67	Durham	Township	1,094
68	Hulmeville	Borough	982
69	Ivyland	Borough	955
70	Trumbauersville	Borough	904
71	Riegelsville	Borough	849
72	Silverdale	Borough	804

== Climate ==
=== Piedmont Region ===
According to the Trewartha climate classification system, the Piedmont (United States) section of Bucks County, which is located roughly northwest of U.S. Route 1, has a Temperate Continental Climate with hot and slightly humid summers, cold winters and year-around precipitation (Dcao). Dcao climates are characterized by at least one month having an average mean temperature ≤ 32.0 °F (0 °C), four to seven months with an average mean temperature ≥ 50.0 °F (10 °C), at least one month with an average mean temperature ≥ 72.0 °F (22 °C) and no significant precipitation difference between seasons. According to the Köppen climate classification system, the climate is a hot-summer, wet all year, humid continental climate (Dfa). During the summer months in the Piedmont, episodes of extreme heat and humidity can occur with heat index values > 102 °F (39 °C). The average wettest month is July which corresponds with the annual peak in thunderstorm activity.

During the winter months, episodes of extreme cold and wind can occur with wind chill values < −16 °F (−27 °C). The plant hardiness zone at Haycock Mountain, elevation 968 ft (295 m), is 6b with an average annual extreme minimum air temperature of −4.6 °F (−20 °C). The average seasonal (Nov-Apr) snowfall total is between 26 and 36 inches (66 and 91 centimetres) depending on elevation and distance from the Atlantic Ocean. The average snowiest month is February which correlates with the annual peak in nor'easter activity. Some areas of the Piedmont farther south and along the river below New Hope are in hardiness zone 7a, as is the Atlantic Coastal Plain region of Bucks.

Climate data for Haycock Twp. Elevation: 735 ft (224 m). 1981–2010 averages (1981–2018 records).
Month	Jan	Feb	Mar	Apr	May	Jun	Jul	Aug	Sep	Oct	Nov	Dec	Year
Record high °F (°C)	69.9 (21.1)	77.8 (25.4)	86.8 (30.4)	93.1 (33.9)	93.9 (34.4)	94.5 (34.7)	101.4 (38.6)	98.6 (37.0)	96.3 (35.7)	88.9 (31.6)	79.6 (26.4)	73.7 (23.2)	101.4 (38.6)
Mean daily maximum °F (°C)	37.3 (2.9)	41.1 (5.1)	49.1 (9.5)	61.3 (16.3)	71.0 (21.7)	79.2 (26.2)	83.5 (28.6)	81.9 (27.7)	75.2 (24.0)	64.1 (17.8)	53.4 (11.9)	41.7 (5.4)	61.7 (16.5)
Daily mean °F (°C)	28.4 (−2.0)	31.4 (−0.3)	38.7 (3.7)	49.9 (9.9)	59.7 (15.4)	68.4 (20.2)	72.8 (22.7)	71.4 (21.9)	64.3 (17.9)	53.3 (11.8)	43.7 (6.5)	33.2 (0.7)	51.4 (10.8)
Mean daily minimum °F (°C)	19.5 (−6.9)	21.7 (−5.7)	28.4 (−2.0)	38.4 (3.6)	48.3 (9.1)	57.7 (14.3)	62.1 (16.7)	60.9 (16.1)	53.4 (11.9)	42.5 (5.8)	34.0 (1.1)	24.7 (−4.1)	41.1 (5.1)
Record low °F (°C)	−13.9 (−25.5)	−6.5 (−21.4)	0.7 (−17.4)	15.9 (−8.9)	31.4 (−0.3)	39.4 (4.1)	45.4 (7.4)	40.2 (4.6)	33.8 (1.0)	22.7 (−5.2)	9.8 (−12.3)	−3.5 (−19.7)	−13.9 (−25.5)
Average precipitation inches (mm)	3.54 (90)	2.89 (73)	3.74 (95)	4.25 (108)	4.24 (108)	4.34 (110)	5.11 (130)	4.12 (105)	4.45 (113)	4.56 (116)	3.83 (97)	4.20 (107)	49.27 (1,251)
Average relative humidity (%)	68.6	64.5	60.7	58.9	64.0	70.4	69.9	72.5	73.4	71.7	69.6	70.1	67.9
Average dew point °F (°C)	19.4 (−7.0)	20.8 (−6.2)	26.3 (−3.2)	36.1 (2.3)	47.5 (8.6)	58.4 (14.7)	62.4 (16.9)	62.1 (16.7)	55.6 (13.1)	44.4 (6.9)	34.4 (1.3)	24.5 (−4.2)	41.1 (5.1)
Source: PRISM

Climate data for Doylestown, Pennsylvania
Month	Jan	Feb	Mar	Apr	May	Jun	Jul	Aug	Sep	Oct	Nov	Dec	Year
Mean daily maximum °F (°C)	39 (4)	43 (6)	52 (11)	63 (17)	74 (23)	82 (28)	87 (31)	85 (29)	77 (25)	66 (19)	55 (13)	44 (7)	64 (18)
Mean daily minimum °F (°C)	24 (−4)	25 (−4)	33 (1)	42 (6)	52 (11)	61 (16)	66 (19)	65 (18)	57 (14)	45 (7)	37 (3)	29 (−2)	45 (7)
Average precipitation inches (mm)	3.94 (100)	2.87 (73)	4.24 (108)	3.85 (98)	4.81 (122)	3.61 (92)	4.72 (120)	4.34 (110)	4.66 (118)	3.35 (85)	3.74 (95)	3.80 (97)	47.93 (1,217)
Source: Weather Channel

=== Atlantic Coastal Plain Region ===
According to the Trewartha climate classification system, the Atlantic coastal plain section of Bucks County, which is located roughly southeast of U.S. Route 1 has a Temperate Oceanic Climate with hot and slightly humid summers, cool winters and year-around precipitation (Doak). Doak climates are characterized by all months having an average mean temperature > 32.0 °F (0 °C), four to seven months with an average mean temperature ≥ 50.0 °F (10 °C), at least one month with an average mean temperature ≥ 72.0 °F (22 °C) and no significant precipitation difference between seasons. According to the Köppen climate classification, this region has a humid subtropical climate (Cfa). During the summer months in the Atlantic Coastal Plain, episodes of extreme heat and humidity can occur with heat index values > 110 °F (43 °C). The average wettest month is July which corresponds with the annual peak in thunderstorm activity. During the winter months, episodes of extreme cold and wind can occur with wind chill values < −7 °F (−22 °C). The plant hardiness zone in Andalusia, Bensalem Twp, elevation 16 ft (4.9 m), is 7a with an average annual extreme minimum air temperature of 3.0 °F (−16 °C). The average seasonal (Nov-Apr) snowfall total is between 24 and 26 inches (61 and 66 centimetres) depending on elevation and distance from the Atlantic Ocean. The average snowiest month is February which correlates with the annual peak in nor'easter activity.

Climate data for Andalusia, Bensalem Twp. Elevation: 16 ft (4.9 m). 1981–2010 averages (1981–2018 records).
Month	Jan	Feb	Mar	Apr	May	Jun	Jul	Aug	Sep	Oct	Nov	Dec	Year
Record high °F (°C)	72.5 (22.5)	78.7 (25.9)	87.7 (30.9)	94.1 (34.5)	96.1 (35.6)	97.5 (36.4)	103.5 (39.7)	101.3 (38.5)	99.1 (37.3)	89.6 (32.0)	81.8 (27.7)	76.6 (24.8)	103.5 (39.7)
Mean daily maximum °F (°C)	41.0 (5.0)	44.4 (6.9)	52.6 (11.4)	63.9 (17.7)	73.7 (23.2)	82.9 (28.3)	86.9 (30.5)	85.5 (29.7)	78.7 (25.9)	67.3 (19.6)	56.4 (13.6)	45.4 (7.4)	65.0 (18.3)
Daily mean °F (°C)	33.4 (0.8)	36.0 (2.2)	43.3 (6.3)	53.8 (12.1)	63.3 (17.4)	72.8 (22.7)	77.4 (25.2)	76.0 (24.4)	68.9 (20.5)	57.3 (14.1)	47.6 (8.7)	37.8 (3.2)	55.7 (13.2)
Mean daily minimum °F (°C)	25.6 (−3.6)	27.6 (−2.4)	34.1 (1.2)	43.6 (6.4)	52.9 (11.6)	62.7 (17.1)	67.8 (19.9)	66.4 (19.1)	59.1 (15.1)	47.3 (8.5)	38.9 (3.8)	30.3 (−0.9)	46.4 (8.0)
Record low °F (°C)	−7.4 (−21.9)	−0.6 (−18.1)	5.7 (−14.6)	19.5 (−6.9)	35.2 (1.8)	44.4 (6.9)	51.0 (10.6)	45.4 (7.4)	38.8 (3.8)	27.6 (−2.4)	15.0 (−9.4)	1.6 (−16.9)	−7.4 (−21.9)
Average precipitation inches (mm)	3.52 (89)	2.73 (69)	4.23 (107)	3.88 (99)	4.20 (107)	4.18 (106)	4.97 (126)	4.34 (110)	4.14 (105)	3.71 (94)	3.46 (88)	3.93 (100)	47.29 (1,201)
Average relative humidity (%)	64.2	60.9	56.1	56.5	60.7	62.8	64.1	66.2	66.8	66.9	65.5	66.4	63.1
Average dew point °F (°C)	22.6 (−5.2)	23.8 (−4.6)	28.7 (−1.8)	38.7 (3.7)	49.5 (9.7)	59.4 (15.2)	64.3 (17.9)	63.9 (17.7)	57.4 (14.1)	46.4 (8.0)	36.6 (2.6)	27.6 (−2.4)	43.3 (6.3)
Source: PRISM

Climate data for Newbold Channel, Falls Twp, Delaware River water temperature
Month	Jan	Feb	Mar	Apr	May	Jun	Jul	Aug	Sep	Oct	Nov	Dec	Year
Daily mean °F (°C)	37 (3)	37 (3)	44 (7)	53 (12)	63 (17)	74 (23)	81 (27)	80 (27)	73 (23)	60 (16)	48 (9)	40 (4)	58 (14)
Source: NOAA

== Ecology ==
According to the A. W. Kuchler U.S. potential natural vegetation types, Bucks County, Pennsylvania has a dominant vegetation type of Appalachian Oak (104) with a dominant vegetation form of Eastern Hardwood Forest (25).

== Notable people ==
- Charles Albright (1830–1880), United States congressman; born in Bucks County
- Christy Altomare (1986–), actress and singer-songwriter, originated the role Anya in the musical Anastasia
- Jacob Jennings Brown (1775–1828), commanding general of the United States Army
- Ulric Dahlgren (1842–1864), Union Army colonel; unsuccessful raid on Richmond, Virginia started the Dahlgren Affair
- Charles Ellet, Jr. (1810–1862), civil engineer and Union Army officer
- Samuel Hartsel (1834–1918), Colorado ranching pioneer
- Michael Hurley (1941–2025), singer and guitarist
- Samuel D. Ingham (1779-1860), U.S. representative and U.S. Treasury secretary in the Andrew Jackson administration
- Ro Khanna (1976-), U.S. representative from California's 17th congressional district
- Saige Martin, former member of the Raleigh City Council
- Rembrandt Peale (1778–1860), portrait painter and museum keeper
- Allen Rosenberg (1931–2013), rower and rowing coach
- Andrew Jackson Smith (1815–1897), Union army general
- Arthur Donaldson Smith (1866–1939), explorer of East Africa
- Ezra Stone (1917–1994), actor and director
- Sabrina carpenter (1999-), Actress, singer-songwriter

== Official seal ==
The traditional seal of Bucks County, Pennsylvania takes its design from the inspiration of the county's founder, William Penn. The center of the seal consists of a shield from the Penn family crest with a tree above and a flowering vine surrounding it in symmetric flanks. The seal has a gold-colored background and a green band denoting Penn as the county's first proprietor and governor.

In 1683, Penn's council decreed that a tree and vine be incorporated into the emblem to signify the county's abundance of woods. The seal was used in its official capacity until the Revolutionary War. The county government has since used the official Pennsylvania state seal for official documents. Today, the Bucks County seal's use is largely ceremonial. It appears on county stationery and vehicles as a symbol of the county's heritage. The gold emblem is also the centerpiece of the official Bucks County flag, which has a blue background and gold trim.

== See also ==
- National Register of Historic Places listings in Bucks County, Pennsylvania
