= Hagersville =

Hagersville may refer to:

- Hagersville, Ontario
- Hagersville, Pennsylvania
