= Moon Nurseries =

Wholesale nursery located in Chesapeake City, Maryland, US

Moon Nurseries Inc.
- Company type: Private
- Industry: wholesale nursery, Horticulture and gardening
- Founded: 1767; 259 years ago, Bucks County, PA
- Headquarters: Chesapeake City, Maryland
- Products: Plants, Flowers, Trees, Shrubs, Lawn Care, and Gardening Supplies
- Website: www.moonnurseries.com

Moon Nurseries is a wholesale horticultural nursery located in Chesapeake City, Maryland, USA. Moon grows different varieties of B&B (balled and burlapped) trees, shrubs, and container plants including grasses, roses and perennials. It began its operations in Yardley, Pennsylvania in 1971 under the ownership of Walt Flowers and began production at the current Chesapeake City, Maryland location under the leadership of John Pursell in 1989. Today, Moon Nurseries is an employee owned and operated company producing over 40,000 trees and 350,000 container plants a year from their Maryland nurseries.

Over 50,000 trees and 400,000 container plants of new and old plant varieties are being sold and grown every year. The nursery has 365 greenhouses, all of which are 450 feet long. The lining out stock or field stock is purchased from nurseries like J. Frank Schmidt & Son in Boring, Oregon, and other similar growers.

Moon's stock is sold to wholesale customers only and not to mass merchandisers or chain stores. Moon Banks on Quality, Reputation.

Moon Nurseries is the member of AMERICAN NURSERY & LANDSCAPE ASSOCIATION (ANLA) and Mark A. Brinsky of Moon is among the board of directors under Landscape Distribution Division of ANLA.

The nursery company is also a member of Pennsylvania Landscape and Nursery Association (PLNA), Delaware Nursery & Landscape Association (DNLA), Maryland Nursery and Landscape Association (MNLA) and American Society of Landscape Architects (ASLA)

The tree selected for the President Inaugural ceremony 2009 for President Elect Barack Obama was a White Oak, Quercus alba, purchased from Moon Nurseries of Maryland's Eastern shore. The tree planting ceremony took place at the Mt Zion Cemetery in Washington DC, on January 19, 2009 to commemorate Martin Luther King Jr.’s birthday.

The nursery provided hundreds of trees and shrubs to Delaware Valley College. John Pursell, the president of Moon Nurseries is an alumnus from Class of 1981. Moon is listed among the career day companies of 2009 in Delaware Valley College.

The company participated as an exhibitor in MANTS 2009. Pennsylvania College of Technology has approved Moon Nurseries as an internship employer

Moon Nurseries is a registered supplier and certified vendor with the state of Delaware for bio retention soil mixture. Moon Nurseries also carries a full line of local vegetation for bio retention plantings, including moisture and flood-resistant grasses, shrubs and canopy trees.

In early 2008, Moon Nurseries submitted samples of its bio retention soil mixture (BSM) to a DNREC approved laboratory (Duffield Associates, Consultants in the Geosciences) to obtain certification of its bio soil medium. Laboratory testing was performed on a representative sample of biofiltration soil to evaluate general conformance of the sample provided with DNREC – Soil and Water Conservation Division's requirements for biofiltration soil. The laboratory concluded that all Mix Components, Sand Gradation, and Infiltration Rate met or exceeded the DNREC required standards. Moon Nurseries has been a reliable, certified supplier of bioretention soil to the Delaware area ever since. Customers can contact them for low-impact development or stormwater management needs.

== History ==
The company can trace its roots to William H. Moon, who founded the nursery in Bucks County, Pa. In 1767, founder William H. Moon sold the company's first tree for 8 shillings as the dollars did not even exist at that time. An old advertisement for ornamental and fruiting trees, written by William H. MOON can be found at theoldentimes.

The company has gone through location and ownership changes in 240 years. Today, Moon Nurseries is an employee owned and operated company producing over 40,000 trees and 350,000 container plants a year from Moon's Maryland nurseries.

== Location ==
Moon Nurseries is located on Maryland's Eastern Shore between the Chesapeake Bay and the Delaware Bay.
