= Brittany Farms-The Highlands, Pennsylvania =

Unincorporated community in Pennsylvania, US

Brittany Farms-The Highlands
- Census-designated place
- Location of Brittany Farms-The Highlands in Pennsylvania Brittany Farms-The Highlands (the United States)
- Coordinates: 40°16′22″N 75°12′56″W
- Country: United States
- State: Pennsylvania
- County: Bucks
- Township: New Britain

Area
  - Total: 1.20 sq mi (3.10 km^{2})
  - Land: 1.19 sq mi (3.09 km^{2})
  - Water: 0.0039 sq mi (0.01 km^{2})
- Elevation: 430 ft (130 m)

Population (2020)
  - Total: 4,175
  - Density: 3,503.4/sq mi (1,352.66/km^{2})
- Time zone: UTC-5 (EST)
  - Summer (DST): UTC-4 (EDT)
- ZIP code: 18914
- Area codes: 215, 267, and 445
- FIPS code: 42-08819

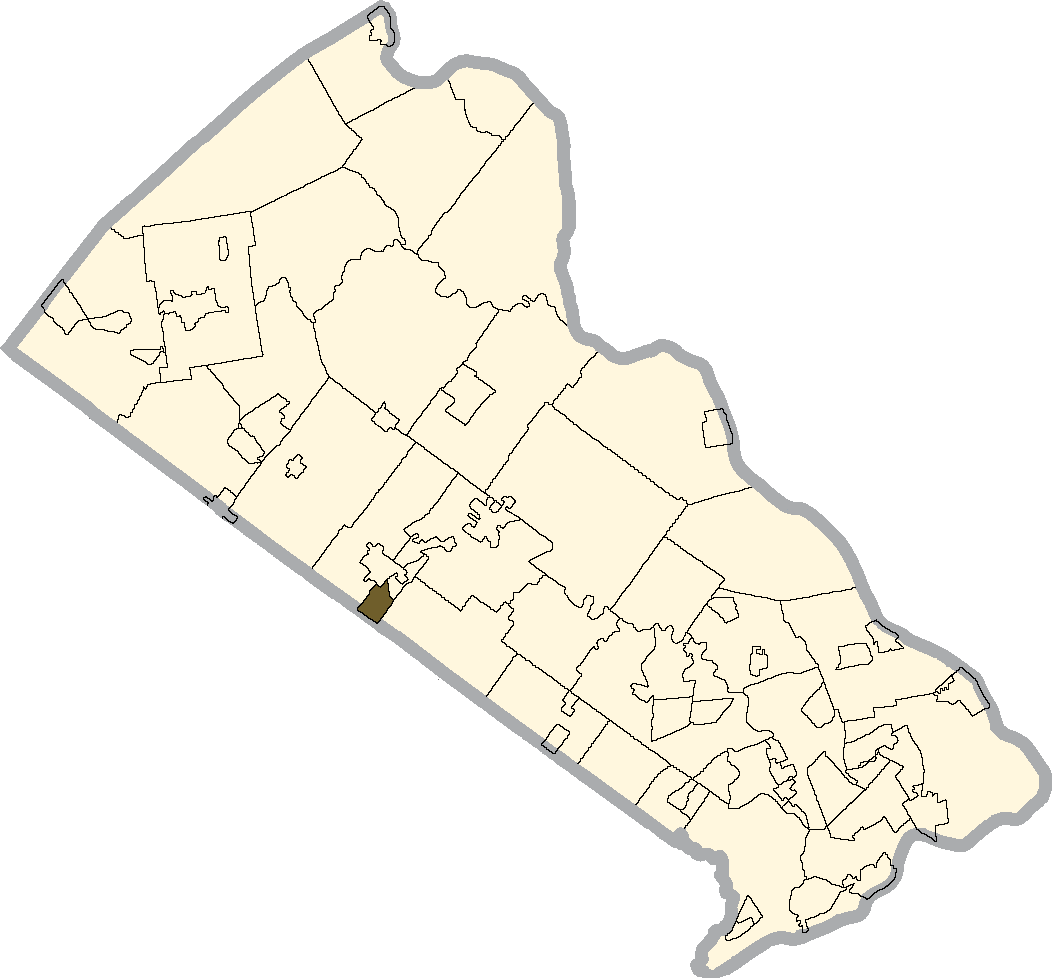
Brittany Farms-The Highlands shaded on the map of Bucks County, PA

Brittany Farms-The Highlands is a census-designated place (CDP) in Bucks County, Pennsylvania, United States. The population was 3,695 at the 2010 census.

At the 2000 census, it was listed as "Brittany Farms-Highlands" CDP.

== Geography ==
Brittany Farms-The Highlands is located at 40°16′22″N 75°12′56″W (40.272656, -75.215680).

According to the United States Census Bureau, the CDP has a total area of 1.2 square miles (3.1 km^{2}), all land.

== Demographics ==
Historical population
Census	Pop.	Note	%±
1990	2,747		—
2000	3,268		19.0%
2010	3,695		13.1%
2020	4,175		13.0%

=== 2020 census ===
As of the 2020 census, Brittany Farms-The Highlands had a population of 4,175. The median age was 44.5 years. 20.6% of residents were under the age of 18 and 21.5% of residents were 65 years of age or older. For every 100 females there were 86.5 males, and for every 100 females age 18 and over there were 82.1 males age 18 and over.

100.0% of residents lived in urban areas, while 0.0% lived in rural areas.

There were 1,772 households in Brittany Farms-The Highlands, of which 26.8% had children under the age of 18 living in them. Of all households, 49.0% were married-couple households, 12.8% were households with a male householder and no spouse or partner present, and 32.4% were households with a female householder and no spouse or partner present. About 31.1% of all households were made up of individuals and 16.9% had someone living alone who was 65 years of age or older.

There were 1,841 housing units, of which 3.7% were vacant. The homeowner vacancy rate was 0.2% and the rental vacancy rate was 7.6%.

Racial composition as of the 2020 census
Race	Number	Percent
White	3,553	85.1%
Black or African American	100	2.4%
American Indian and Alaska Native	0	0.0%
Asian	263	6.3%
Native Hawaiian and Other Pacific Islander	2	0.0%
Some other race	50	1.2%
Two or more races	207	5.0%
Hispanic or Latino (of any race)	159	3.8%

=== 2010 census ===
As of the 2010 census, Brittany Farms-The Highlands was 90.8% White, 2.0% Black or African American, 3.7% Asian, 0.2% some other race, and 0.9% were two or more races. 2.5% of the population was of Hispanic or Latino ancestry.

=== 2000 census ===
At the 2000 census there were 3,268 people, 1,415 households, and 942 families living in the CDP. The population density was 2,729.6 inhabitants per square mile (1,053.9/km^{2}). There were 1,441 housing units at an average density of 1,203.6 per square mile (464.7/km^{2}). The racial makeup of the CDP was 95.99% White, 1.35% African American, 0.03% Native American, 1.01% Asian, 0.70% from other races, and 0.92% from two or more races. Hispanic or Latino of any race were 1.25%.

There were 1,415 households, 27.3% had children under the age of 18 living with them, 55.9% were married couples living together, 8.6% had a female householder with no husband present, and 33.4% were non-families. 28.6% of households were made up of individuals, and 11.3% were one person aged 65 or older. The average household size was 2.31 and the average family size was 2.84.

The age distribution was 21.0% under the age of 18, 4.2% from 18 to 24, 31.2% from 25 to 44, 25.6% from 45 to 64, and 18.0% 65 or older. The median age was 41 years. For every 100 females, there were 87.3 males. For every 100 females age 18 and over, there were 83.6 males.

The median household income was $60,786 and the median family income was $67,340. Males had a median income of $57,292 versus $35,799 for females. The per capita income for the CDP was $28,067. About 1.2% of families and 2.4% of the population were below the poverty line, including 2.7% of those under age 18 and 3.5% of those age 65 or over.

== Education ==
It is in the Central Bucks School District.

Butler Elementary School is within the CDP. It feeds into Unami Middle School and Central Bucks South High School.
