= Hood, Pennsylvania =

Unincorporated community in Pennsylvania, US

- Populated place
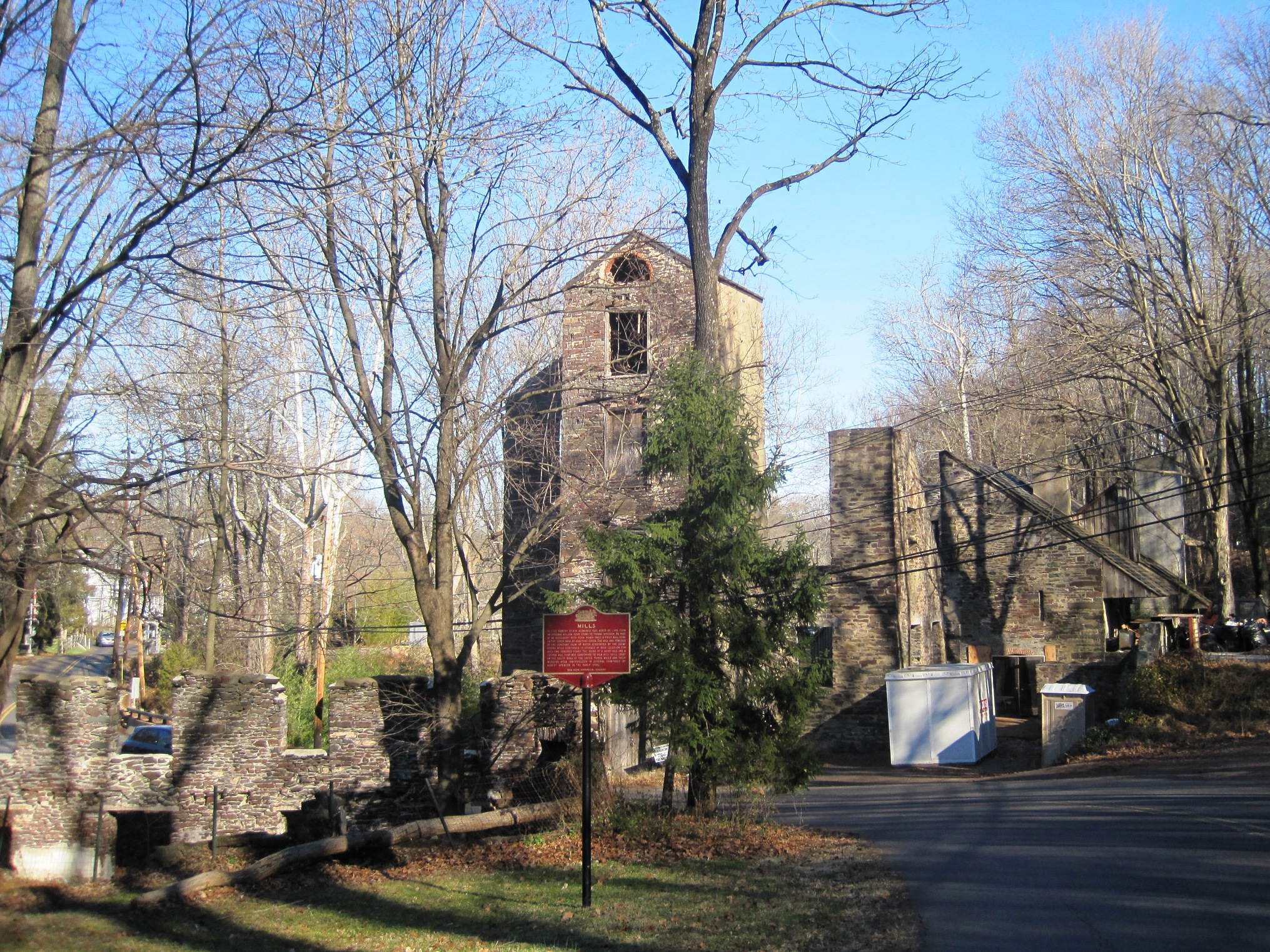
- Ruins of Robert Heath Mills

- Location of Hood in Pennsylvania Hood, Pennsylvania (the United States)
- Coordinates: 40°21′39″N 74°57′47″W
- Country: United States
- State: Pennsylvania
- County: Bucks
- Borough: New Hope
- Elevation: 108 ft (33 m)
- Time zone: UTC-5 (Eastern (EST))
  - Summer (DST): UTC-4 (EDT)
- Area code: 215
- FIPS code: 42-35558
- GNIS feature ID: 1203833

Hood is a populated place that is located in New Hope, a borough in Bucks County, Pennsylvania, United States.

== History ==
The site features ruins of the Robert Heath Mills, a grist mill built in the early 1700s.

The original name of this community was Springdale.

== Geography ==
Hood has an estimated elevation of 108 feet (33 m) above sea level and is located at the intersection of Mechanic Street and Sugan Road. Located near the settlement are Aquetong Creek and New Hope and Ivyland Railroad.

== See also ==
Springdale Historic District (New Hope, Pennsylvania)
