= Woodside, Pennsylvania =

Unincorporated community in Pennsylvania, US

- Census-designated place
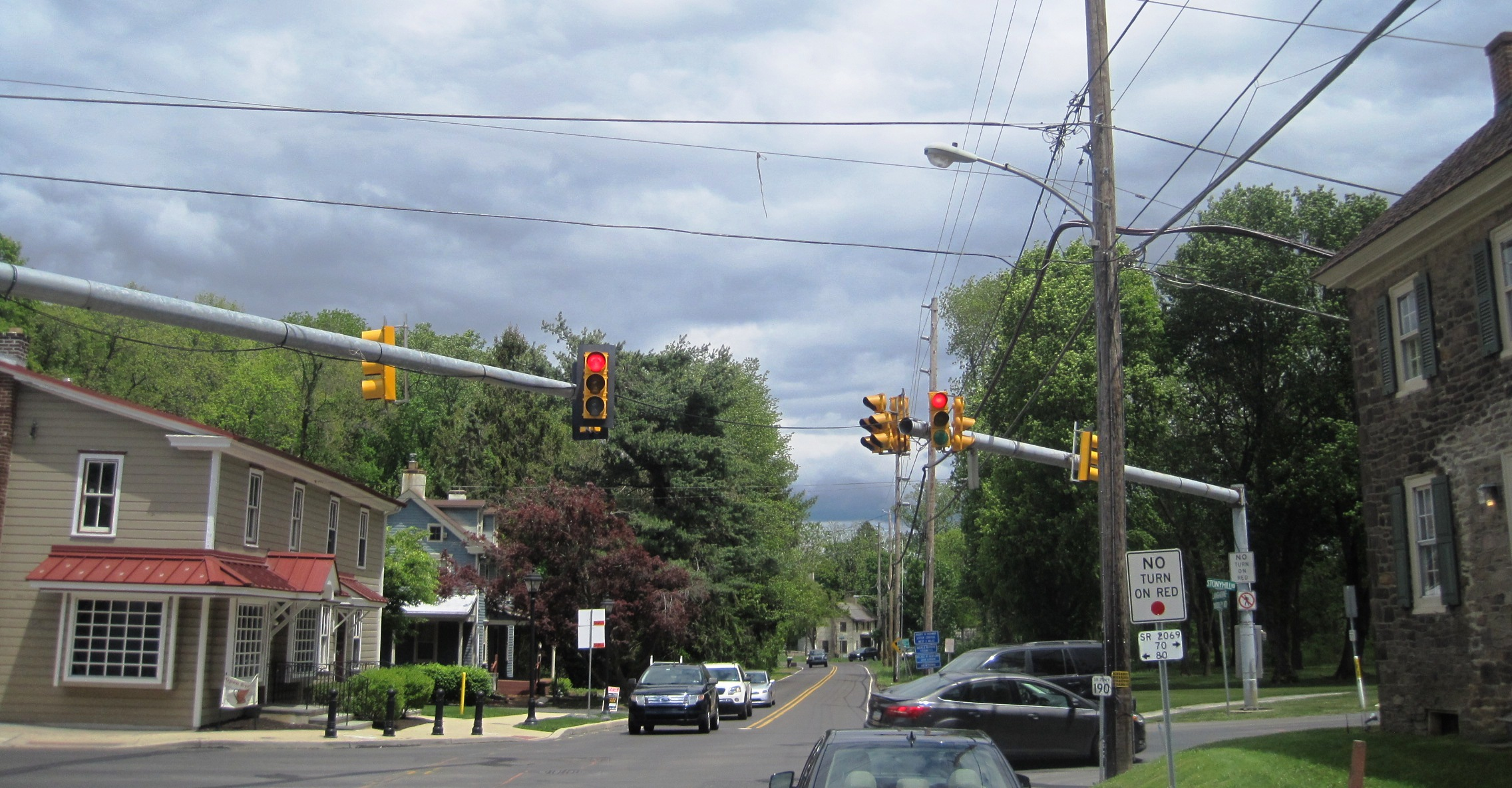
- Intersection of Langhorne-Yardley Road and Stony Hill Road

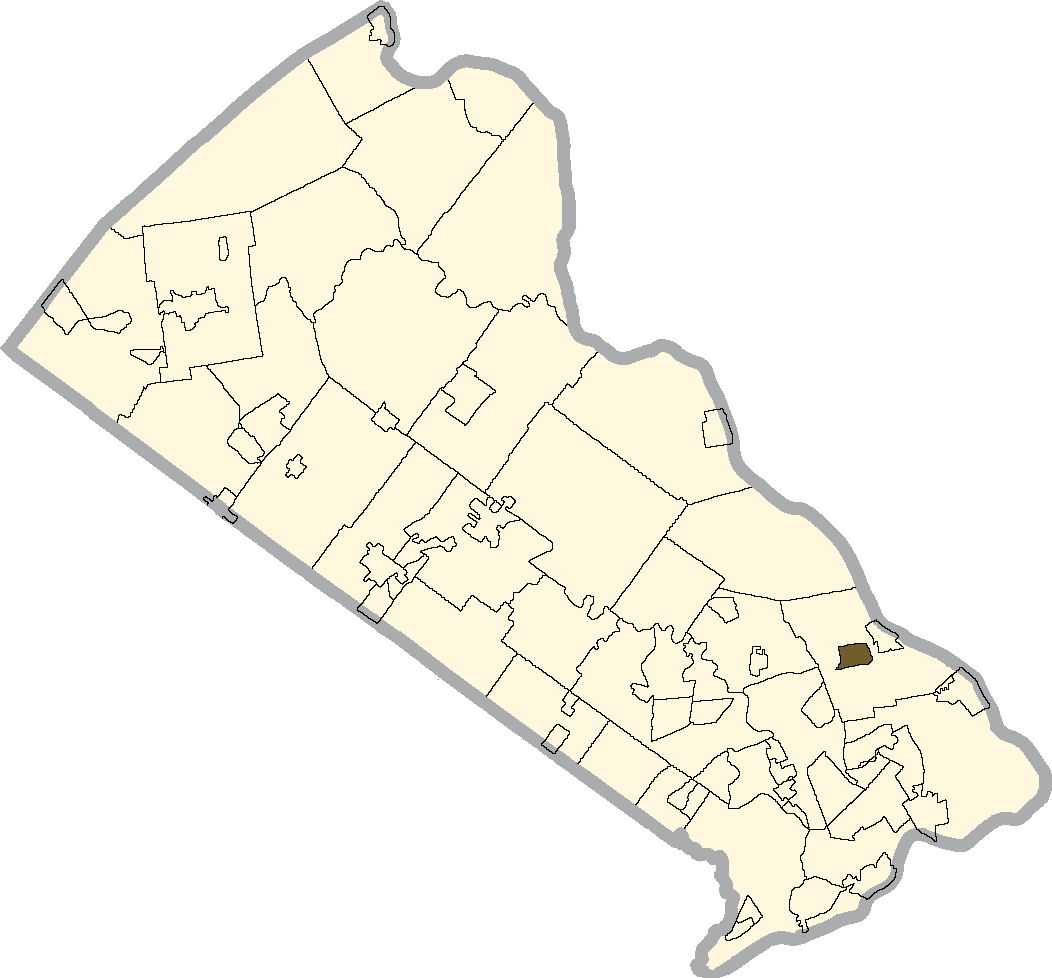
- Location of Woodside in Bucks County

- Location of Woodside in Pennsylvania Woodside, Pennsylvania (the United States)
- Coordinates: 40°13′50″N 74°51′29″W
- Country: United States
- State: Pennsylvania
- County: Bucks
- Township: Lower Makefield

Area
  - Total: 1.0 sq mi (2.6 km^{2})
  - Land: 1.0 sq mi (2.6 km^{2})
  - Water: 0.0 sq mi (0 km^{2})
- Elevation: 157 ft (48 m)

Population (2020)
  - Total: 3,133
  - Density: 3,100/sq mi (1,200/km^{2})
- Time zone: UTC-5 (EST)
  - Summer (DST): UTC-4 (EDT)
- ZIP code: 19067
- Area codes: 215, 267 and 445

Woodside is a census-designated place (CDP) in Lower Makefield Township, Pennsylvania, United States. The population was 3,133 at the 2020 census.

== Geography ==
Woodside is located at 40°13′50″N 74°51′29″W (40.230596, −74.858193).

According to the United States Census Bureau, the CDP has a total area of 1.0 square mile (2.6 km^{2}), all land.

== Demographics ==
Historical population
Census	Pop.	Note	%±
1990	2,947		—
2000	2,575		−12.6%
2010	2,425		−5.8%
2020	2,443		0.7%

As of the 2010 census, the population was 88.0% White, 1.8% Black or African American, 0.1% Native American, 7.2% Asian, and 0.9% were two or more races. 2.1% of the population were of Hispanic or Latino ancestry.

As of the census of 2000, there were 2,575 people, 791 households, and 745 families living in the CDP. The population density was 2,518.7 inhabitants per square mile (972.5/km^{2}). There were 799 housing units at an average density of 781.5 per square mile (301.7/km^{2}). The racial makeup of the CDP was 92.78% White, 1.86% African American, 0.04% Native American, 4.39% Asian, 0.19% from other races, and 0.74% from two or more races. Hispanic or Latino of any race were 1.20% of the population.

There were 791 households, out of which 51.2% had children under the age of 18 living with them, 88.2% were married couples living together, 4.4% had a female householder with no husband present, and 5.8% were non-families. 4.3% of all households were made up of individuals, and 1.5% had someone living alone who was 65 years of age or older. The average household size was 3.26 and the average family size was 3.35.

In the CDP, the population was spread out, with 30.5% under the age of 18, 6.2% from 18 to 24, 21.3% from 25 to 44, 36.9% from 45 to 64, and 5.1% who were 65 years of age or older. The median age was 41 years. For every 100 females, there were 97.2 males. For every 100 females age 18 and over, there were 96.1 males.

The median income for a household in the CDP was $121,151, and the median income for a family was $125,211. Males had a median income of $92,852 versus $51,532 for females. The per capita income for the CDP was $42,653. About 2.1% of families and 2.9% of the population were below the poverty line, including 1.7% of those under age 18 and none of those age 65 or over.
