= Hinkletown, Bucks County, Pennsylvania =

Unincorporated community in Pennsylvania, US

Hinkletown, Pennsylvania
- Populated place
- Location of Hinkletown in Pennsylvania Hinkletown (the United States)
- Coordinates: 40°24′16″N 75°07′24″W
- Country: United States
- State: Pennsylvania
- County: Bucks
- Elevation: 528 ft (161 m)
- Time zone: UTC-5 (Eastern (EST))
  - Summer (DST): UTC-4 (EDT)
- Area code: 215
- FIPS code: 42-34984
- GNIS feature ID: 1203816

Hinkletown is a populated place situated in Plumstead Township in Bucks County, Pennsylvania, United States. It has an estimated elevation of 528 feet (161 m) above sea level.

The community was named for Philip Hinkle, an early settler who opened a tavern there in 1794.
