= Newtown Grant, Pennsylvania =

Unincorporated community in Pennsylvania, US

Newtown Grant
- Census-designated place
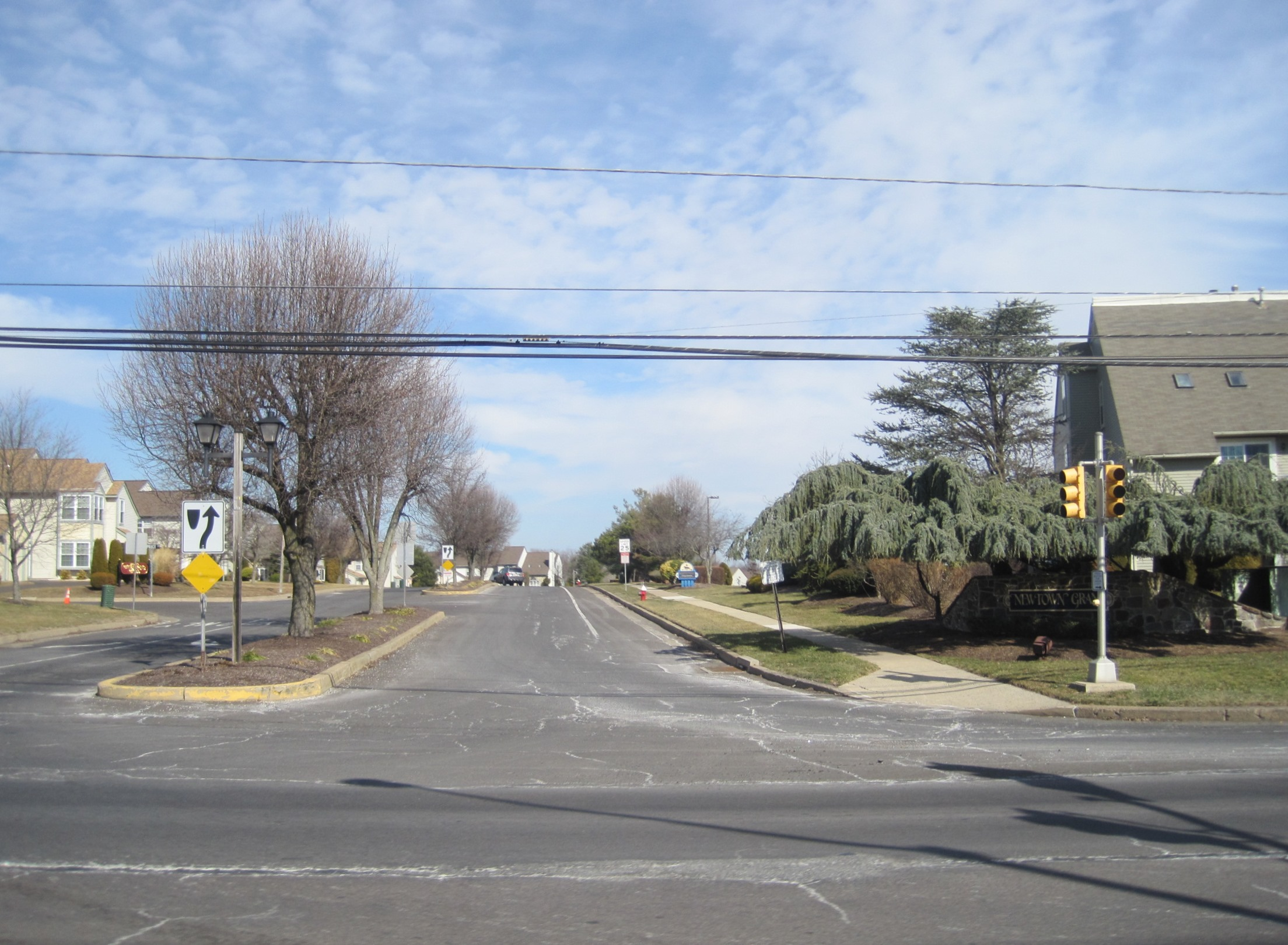
- Entrance to the development at PA 413 and North Drive

- Location of Newtown Grant in Pennsylvania Newtown Grant (the United States)
- Coordinates: 40°15′33″N 74°57′17″W
- Country: United States
- State: Pennsylvania
- County: Bucks
- Township: Newtown

Area
  - Total: 1.86 sq mi (4.82 km^{2})
  - Land: 1.86 sq mi (4.81 km^{2})
  - Water: 0.0039 sq mi (0.01 km^{2})
- Elevation: 289 ft (88 m)

Population (2020)
  - Total: 5,855
  - Density: 3,152.7/sq mi (1,217.26/km^{2})
- Time zone: UTC-5 (EST)
  - Summer (DST): UTC-4 (EDT)
- ZIP code: 18940
- Area codes: 215, 267, and 445
- FIPS code: 42-54268

Newtown Grant is a census-designated place (CDP) in Bucks County, Pennsylvania, United States. The population was 3,620 at the 2010 census.

== Geography ==
Newtown Grant is located at 40°15′33″N 74°57′17″W (40.259034, -74.954822).

According to the United States Census Bureau, the CDP has a total area of 0.8 square miles (2.1 km^{2}), all land.

== Demographics ==
Historical population
Census	Pop.	Note	%±
1990	2,141		—
2000	3,887		81.6%
2010	3,620		−6.9%
2020	5,855		61.7%

As of the 2010 census, Newtown Grant was 85.7% White, 1.2% Black or African American, 0.1% Native American, 9.0% Asian, 0.1% some other race, and 1.1% were two or more races. 2.7% of the population was of Hispanic or Latino ancestry.

As of the census of 2000, there were 3,887 people, 5,531 households, and 1,106 families residing in the CDP. The population density was 5,062.5 inhabitants per square mile (1,954.6/km^{2}). There were 1,545 housing units at an average density of 2,012.2 per square mile (776.9/km^{2}). The racial makeup of the CDP was 94.73% White, 1.23% African American, 0.08% Native American, 2.70% Asian, 0.33% from other races, and 0.93% from two or more races. Hispanic or Latino of any race were 1.49% of the population.

There were 1,531 households, out of which 43.5% had children under the age of 18 living with them, 59.0% were married couples living together, 10.5% had a female householder with no husband present, and 27.7% were non-families. 24.0% of all households were made up of individuals, and 2.5% had someone living alone who was 65 years of age or older. The average household size was 2.54 and the average family size was 3.05.

In the CDP, the population was spread out, with 29.4% under the age of 18, 4.3% from 18 to 24, 40.1% from 25 to 44, 21.7% from 45 to 64, and 4.6% who were 65 years of age or older. The median age was 35 years. For every 100 females, there were 94.0 males. For every 100 females age 18 and over, there were 86.4 males.

The median income for a household in the CDP was $74,435, and the median income for a family was $83,500. Males had a median income of $65,078 versus $41,318 for females. The per capita income for the CDP was $33,485. About 0.6% of families and 1.2% of the population were below the poverty line, including 2.6% of those under age 18 and none of those age 65 or over.

== History ==
Newtown Grant was built by Orleans, Inc. builders. It is divided into 14 subsections: Eagles Pointe, Estates I-II, Estates IV, Fawn Hollow, Heather Wood I-II, Pheasant Walk, Quail Creek, Raven's View I-II, Society Place, Whispering Wood, and Willow Creek/Eagle Trace. Acquired from Jonapher Deisendorf.
