= Forest Grove, Bucks County, Pennsylvania =

Unincorporated community in Pennsylvania, US

Forest Grove, Pennsylvania
- Unincorporated community
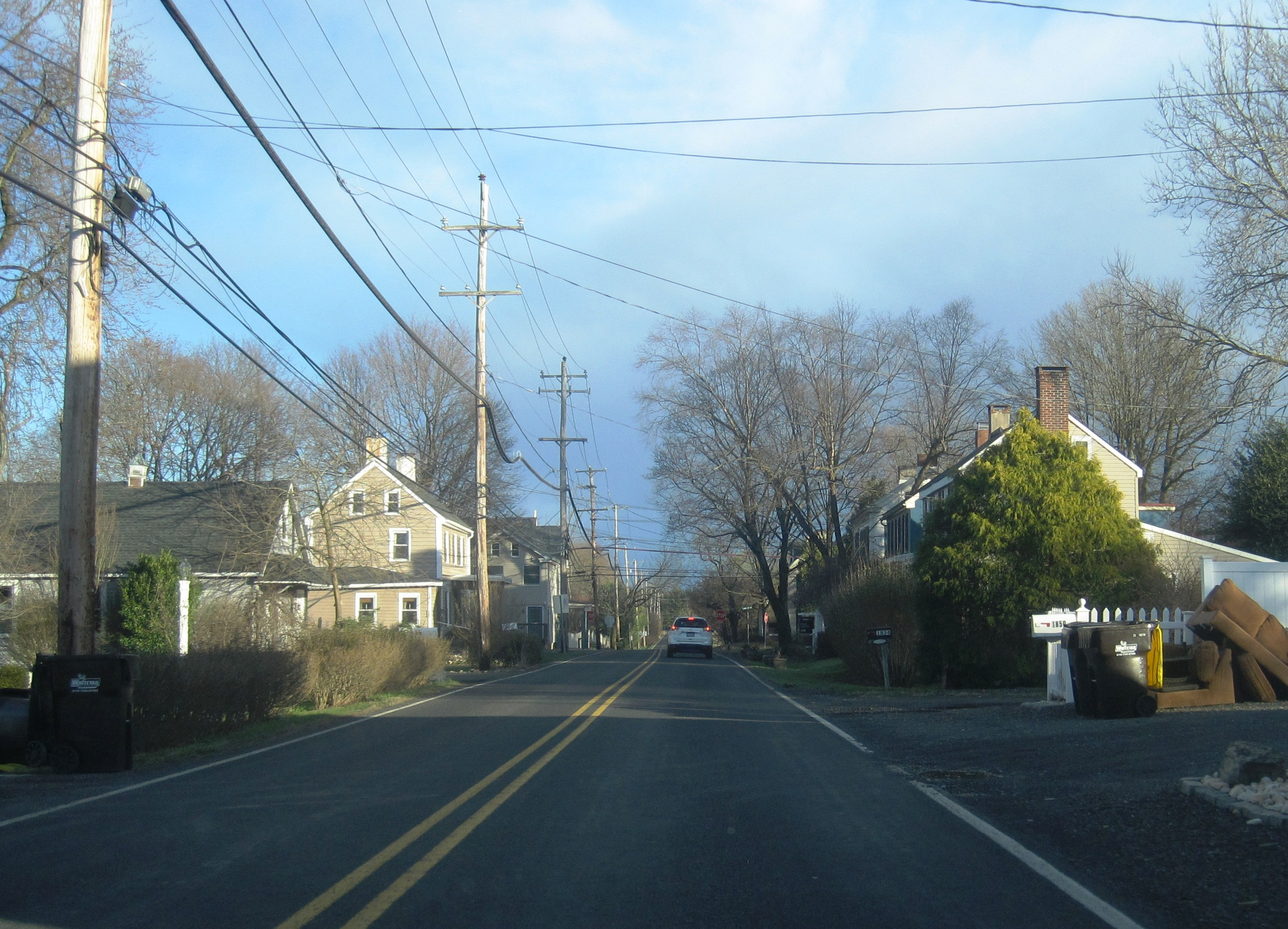
- Along eastbound Forest Grove Road

- Location within Pennsylvania
- Coordinates: 40°17′32″N 75°03′33″W
- Country: United States
- State: Pennsylvania
- County: Bucks
- Township: Buckingham
- Elevation: 289 ft (88 m)
- Time zone: UTC-5 (Eastern (EST))
  - Summer (DST): UTC-4 (EDT)
- ZIP Code: 18922
- Area codes: 215, 267 and 445
- GNIS feature ID: 1174966

Forest Grove is an unincorporated community in Buckingham Township in Bucks County, Pennsylvania, United States. Forest Grove is located at the intersection of Forest Grove Road and Lower Mountain Road.
