= Tinicum Park =

Park in Bucks County, Pennsylvania, USA

- Location within Pennsylvania
- Type: County park
- Location: Erwinna, Bucks County, Pennsylvania
- Coordinates: 40.510°N 75.071°W
- Area: 126 acres (51 hectares)
- Open: Daily, Dawn – Dusk

Tinicum Park is a 126-acre (0.51 km^{2}) park in Bucks County, Pennsylvania. It is located on River Road (PA 32) in Erwinna, Pennsylvania. There is a Polo club that plays in the summer.
