= Brick Tavern, Pennsylvania =

Unincorporated community in Pennsylvania, US

Brick Tavern
- Populated place
- Brick Tavern, Milford Township Brick Tavern (the United States)
- Coordinates: 40°27′23″N 75°23′5″W
- Country: United States
- State: Pennsylvania
- County: Bucks
- Elevation: 554 ft (169 m)
- Time zone: UTC-5 (EST)
  - Summer (DST): UTC-4 (EDT)
- ZIP code: 18951
- Area codes: 215, 267, 445

Brick Tavern is a populated place in Milford Township, Bucks County, Pennsylvania, United States.

== History ==
The village was named for the tavern built in 1818 by Henry Shelly, who was a descendant of a Mennonite family who settled in the area circa 1720. It was a stop on the stagecoach line between Philadelphia and Allentown, and later a trolley stop. The Brick Tavern is still in operation today.

== Geography and statistics ==
The area is part of the Unami Creek watershed, which is part of the Perkiomen Creek watershed, which feeds to the Schuylkill River and ultimately to the Delaware River.

The village is located in the Quakertown Community School District, is served by the Pennsylvania State Police (Dublin Barricks), the Milford Township Volunteer Fire Company (Station 57), and by Lifestar EMS. It is also located in Zip Code 18951, and telephone Area codes 215, 267, and 445.
