= McCaffrey's =

Regional chain of US supermarkets

McCaffrey's Food Markets
- Type: Private
- Industry: Retail
- Founded: 1980
- Founder: Jim McCaffrey III
- Headquarters: Langhorne, Pennsylvania, U.S.
- Number of locations: 9 (2024)
- Key people: Jim McCaffrey III (Founder, Owner, and CEO)
- Products: Bakery, dairy, deli, floral, frozen foods, general grocery, meat, produce, seafood, snacks.
- Website: mccaffreys.com

McCaffrey's Food Markets is a regional chain of supermarkets located in the Northeastern United States. Originally founded in Northeast Philadelphia in 1980, McCaffrey's is a family-owned business that operates locations in Bucks County, Pennsylvania, Montgomery County, Pennsylvania, and Mercer County, New Jersey.

== History ==
Jim McCaffrey III started working at grocery stores as a college student. In 1980, McCaffrey opened his first business, a deli located in Northeast, Philadelphia. Along with his son Jim McCaffrey IV, McCaffrey III opened McCaffrey's Food Market in Yardley, Pennsylvania in 1986. The expanded grocery store featured produce, dairy, and deli sections alongside a wide selection of retail food items.

In 1992, McCaffrey's expanded with a new location in Princeton, NJ.

In 1996, McCaffrey's expanded with a new location in West Windsor, New Jersey.

On February 29, 2004, customers of the McCaffrey's supermarket in Yardley, Pennsylvania noticed flames coming from bushes and leaves adjacent to the building's southern wall. Two on-duty police officers from the Lower Makefield Township, Pennsylvania Police Department spotted smoke at approximately 4:12pm and contacted the local fire dispatch. Officers Glen Hamilton and Jason Braim entered the store and helped to evacuate the nearly 200 customers and employees inside. Reports claim that it took nearly 35 minutes for the Yardley-Makefield Fire Company, which is located directly across the street from the Edgewood Village Shopping Center, to arrive on scene and another 17 minutes before they began pumping water. The fire was contained around 5pm, but left the building and roof severely damaged.

Soon after the fire, McCaffrey's erected a 10,000 square-foot tent in the parking lot of the Edgewood Village Shopping Center. Equipped with electricity, refrigeration, and plumbing, the makeshift store featured a full-service deli, prepared foods, in-store bakery and meat departments as well as a limited selection of grocery items.

On July 15, 2012, McCaffrey's opened a Newtown, Pennsylvania location in the former site of a Genuardi's supermarket.

On April 21, 2016, McCaffrey's opened a new, smaller 13,000 square foot gourmet market concept called Simply Fresh in Doylestown, Pennsylvania at the site of a former Ford Motor Company car dealership.

On July 22, 2016, McCaffrey's opened a 50,000 square foot supermarket in Blue Bell, Pennsylvania in a former Super Fresh, featuring a beer garden and gourmet prepared food stations.

On January 9, 2020, McCaffrey's expanded with a new location in New Hope, Pennsylvania. Also in September 2020, local media covered the retirement of long-time associate Murray Davidson after 22 years of working at the original McCaffrey's location in Yardley, PA.

On June 15, 2026, McCaffrey's opened its Pennington, New Jersey location in the former Pennington Quality Market, a family-owned grocery store on Route 31.
