= Windowizards =

- Company type: Private (defunct)
- Industry: Home Improvement
- Defunct: December 16, 2010
- Headquarters: Levittown, PA
- Area served: Southeastern Pennsylvania, Delaware, New Jersey, Virginia
- Key people: Harvey Goodman (President)
- Website: www.windowizards.com

Windowizards, Inc. was an American home improvement company headquartered in Levittown, Pennsylvania which served southeastern Pennsylvania, Delaware, New Jersey and Virginia. Windowizards's primary services included window replacement, door and bathroom remodeling, siding, insulation and installation services.

In 2009, the company came under fire after an investigation by Philadelphia television station WTXF Fox 29 reported that the company engaged in deceptive business practices by allegedly selling insulated windows that did not contain the amount of foam insulation which the company had claimed they did.

In 2010, the company closed all of its showrooms except at its main office. On December 16, 2010, Windowizards abruptly closed its business, locking out its employees, leaving customers with deposits paid for unfinished work, and covering its sign with a tarp. Its website was taken offline as well. Company president and founder Harvey Goodman refused to speak to reporters from the Philadelphia Daily News about the closure. The company's approximately 100 employees were telephoned in the evening of December 15, 2010 and advised they no longer had jobs with the company.

On February 18, 2011, Goodman declared personal bankruptcy in Florida.

Although the company reopened in late December 2010 shortly after closing, in early February 2011 the company closed again, prompting both civil and criminal investigations by Bucks County, Pennsylvania authorities who were contacted by customers with incomplete work and unrefunded deposits.
