= Danboro, Pennsylvania =

Unincorporated community in Pennsylvania, US

- Unincorporated community
- Location within Pennsylvania
- Coordinates: 40°21′16″N 75°07′58″W
- Country: United States
- State: Pennsylvania
- County: Bucks
- Township: Plumstead
- Elevation: 495 ft (151 m)
- Time zone: UTC-5 (Eastern (EST))
  - Summer (DST): UTC-4 (EDT)
- ZIP Code: 18916
- Area codes: 215, 267 and 445
- GNIS feature ID: 1172917

Danboro is an unincorporated community in Plumstead Township in Bucks County, Pennsylvania, United States. Danboro is located at the intersection of Ferry Road/Danboro Point Pleasant Pike and Old Easton Road, north of Doylestown.
