= Village Shires, Pennsylvania =

Unincorporated community in Pennsylvania, US

Village Shires
- Census-designated place
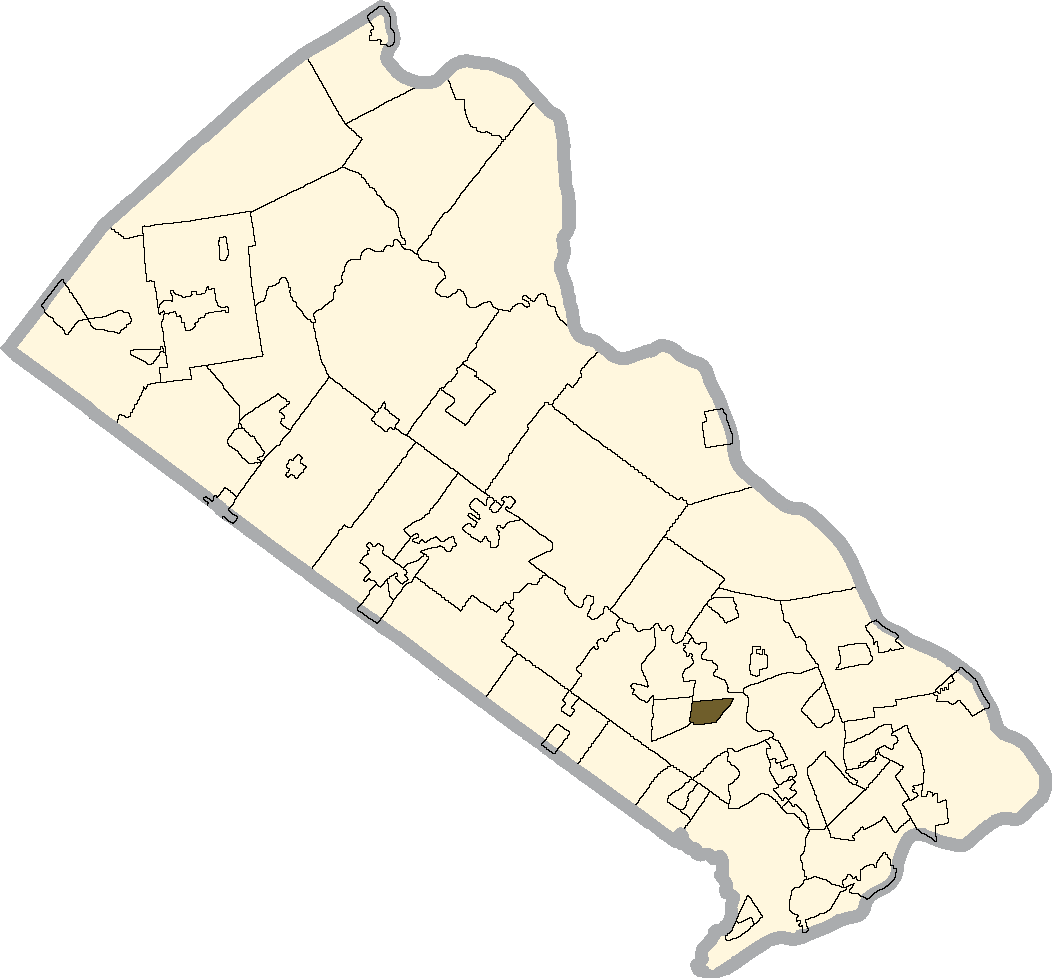
- Village Shires shaded on the map of Bucks county, PA

- Location of Village Shires in Pennsylvania Village Shires (the United States)
- Coordinates: 40°12′03″N 74°58′19″W
- Country: United States
- State: Pennsylvania
- County: Bucks
- Township: Northampton

Area
  - Total: 1.22 sq mi (3.15 km^{2})
  - Land: 1.22 sq mi (3.15 km^{2})
  - Water: 0 sq mi (0.00 km^{2})
- Elevation: 161 ft (49 m)

Population (2020)
  - Total: 3,946
  - Density: 3,246.2/sq mi (1,253.36/km^{2})
- Time zone: UTC-5 (EST)
  - Summer (DST): UTC-4 (EDT)
- ZIP code: 18966
- Area codes: 215, 267, and 445
- FIPS code: 42-80229

Village Shires is a community within Northampton Township, Bucks County in the U.S. state of Pennsylvania. It is defined by the U.S. Census Bureau as a census-designated place (CDP) for statistical purposes and does not have any legal status as a separately incorporated municipality. The population was 3,949 at the 2010 census.

== Geography ==
Village Shires is located at 40°12′3″N 74°58′19″W (40.200808, -74.971928).

According to the United States Census Bureau, the CDP has a total area of 1.2 square miles (3.1 km^{2}), all land.

== Community association ==
Almost every residence in the census designation of Village Shires is part of the Village Shires Community Association. Village Shires is governed by a 7-member community board of directors. The board of directors sets and approves the budget, hires the on-site management, hires the in-house landscaping crew, purchases equipment, contracts with vendors to maintain recreational facilities and community maintenance, and sets community rules and regulations. The on-site management offices are located at 3001 East Village Road.

Village Shires is managed by the Village Shires Community Association (VSCA). The VSCA includes single homes - Heather Valley I and II; townhouses - Country Place I and II, Bridleridge, Natura, and Millpond; and six independent condominium associations, Beacon Hill, Signal Hill/Heritage Place, Tamerlane, Canterbury Croft, Hamlet, and Old Jordan Woods.

In an attempt to facilitate economies of operation, the six condominium associations annually contract with the VSCA to perform combined community services. The VSCA oversees landscaping, snow removal, maintenance, and operation of recreational and common areas through supervisory and contractual agreements with the Danella Management and Realty Co. Inc., an on-site management company.

Community-wide elections are held every November to fill vacant positions on the VSCA Executive Board for the ensuing calendar year. In an effort to ensure continuity of operations, board positions overlap and span two year terms. There are also several committees that report to the executive board, such as the Architectural Control Committee, which assists the executive board in approving or denying requests to make additions and alterations to townhomes by owners.

The Board of Directors meets monthly with the on-site manager to discuss and supervise finances, community matters, correspondence, contractual agreements, vendor and contractor performance, budgetary matters and any other issues pertinent to the community.

== Demographics ==
Historical population
Census	Pop.	Note	%±
1990	4,364		—
2000	4,137		−5.2%
2010	3,949		−4.5%
2020	3,946		−0.1%
U.S. Decennial Census

=== 2020 census ===
As of the 2020 census, Village Shires had a population of 3,946. The median age was 47.5 years. 20.2% of residents were under the age of 18 and 25.7% of residents were 65 years of age or older. For every 100 females there were 86.4 males, and for every 100 females age 18 and over there were 82.0 males age 18 and over.

100.0% of residents lived in urban areas, while 0.0% lived in rural areas.

There were 1,495 households in Village Shires, of which 27.8% had children under the age of 18 living in them. Of all households, 52.5% were married-couple households, 13.5% were households with a male householder and no spouse or partner present, and 29.5% were households with a female householder and no spouse or partner present. About 29.5% of all households were made up of individuals and 14.3% had someone living alone who was 65 years of age or older.

There were 1,754 housing units, of which 14.8% were vacant. The homeowner vacancy rate was 12.1% and the rental vacancy rate was 20.3%.

Racial composition as of the 2020 census
Race	Number	Percent
White	3,617	91.7%
Black or African American	36	0.9%
American Indian and Alaska Native	7	0.2%
Asian	144	3.6%
Native Hawaiian and Other Pacific Islander	0	0.0%
Some other race	25	0.6%
Two or more races	117	3.0%
Hispanic or Latino (of any race)	86	2.2%

=== 2000 census ===
As of the census of 2000, there were 4,137 people, 1,714 households, and 1,064 families residing in the CDP. The population density was 3,477.5 inhabitants per square mile (1,342.7/km^{2}). There were 1,751 housing units at an average density of 1,471.9 per square mile (568.3/km^{2}). The racial makeup of the CDP was 97.10% White, 0.60% African American, 0.12% Native American, 0.94% Asian, 0.48% from other races, and 0.75% from two or more races. Hispanic or Latino of any race were 0.97% of the population.

There were 1,714 households, out of which 29.0% had children under the age of 18 living with them, 53.2% were married couples living together, 7.5% had a female householder with no husband present, and 37.9% were non-families. 34.7% of all households were made up of individuals, and 18.0% had someone living alone who was 65 years of age or older. The average household size was 2.37 and the average family size was 3.11.

In the CDP, the population was spread out, with 22.3% under the age of 18, 6.0% from 18 to 24, 28.4% from 25 to 44, 26.1% from 45 to 64, and 17.2% who were 65 years of age or older. The median age was 41 years. For every 100 females, there were 82.3 males. For every 100 females age 18 and over, there were 77.7 males.

The median income for a household in the CDP was $61,424, and the median income for a family was $83,707. Males had a median income of $55,260 versus $37,295 for females. The per capita income for the CDP was $32,198. None of the families and 1.0% of the population were living below the poverty line, including no under eighteens and 2.7% of those over 64.
