= Hilltop, Pennsylvania =

- Populated place
- Location of Hilltop in Pennsylvania
- Coordinates: 40°29′33″N 75°22′44″W
- Country: United States
- State: Pennsylvania
- County: Bucks
- Elevation: 590 ft (180 m)
- Time zone: UTC-5 (Eastern (EST))
  - Summer (DST): UTC-4 (EDT)
- Area code: 215
- FIPS code: 42-34916
- GNIS feature ID: 1203815

Hilltop is a populated place situated in Springfield Township in Bucks County, Pennsylvania. It has an estimated elevation of 591 feet (180 m) above sea level.
