= Wild River Review =

- Editor: Kimberly Nagy, Joy E. Stocke
- Circulation: online
- First issue: 2006
- Website: wildriverreview.com now repurposed as an online magazine for product reviews

Wild River Review is an online magazine that seeks to raise awareness and compassion as well as inspire engagement through the power of stories. In a climate of repeated media flashes and quick newsbyte stories, Wild River Review curates, edits and publishes essays, opinion, interviews, features, fiction and poetry focusing on underreported issues and perspectives. It published in-depth reporting, works of literature, art, visual art, reviews, interviews, and columns by and about contemporary artists, photographers, and writers.

In 2008, Utne Reader named the website one of the “great” literary magazines, and praised its international literary flavor and “exceptionally interesting interviews”.

Founded in Bucks County, Pennsylvania, the magazine operated from 2006 to 2017 under the direction of founders Joy E. Stocke and Kimberly Nagy.

== Coverage of Women ==
Wild River Review sought to cover and feature strong and compassionate female leaders such as Academy-Award-winning filmmaker Pamela Tanner Boll about her documentary on the underrepresentation of women in the arts, Who Does She Think She Is. WRR also featured interviews with McArthur Genius Edwidge Danticat, as well as and Independent Filmmaker and Founder of the Webbys, Tiffany Shlain. Some other notable female leaders covered include Molecular Biologist and Novelist Sunetra Gupta, Marine Biologist, Sylvia Earle, and Tracy K. Smith, currently serving as the 52nd Poet Laureate, as well as Gioconda Belli, Nicaraguan author, novelist and poet, Natalie Goldberg, Author, Memoirist Mary Karr, Turkish novelist Elif Shafak, Gospel Singer Bertha Morgan and many others.

== Literary events and featured artists ==
The writers and editors at Wild River Review have participated in various literary events and festivals, including Quark Park and Poet's Alley (both held in Princeton, New Jersey, the PEN World Voices: Festival of International Literature and LIVE from NYPL in New York City.

== Reporting ==
The Wild River's series about Abu Ghraib prisoner torture and abuse began publication in August 2007. “The Other Side of Abu Ghraib—the Detainees’ Quest for Justice” examined the event through the lenses of lawyers Susan Burke and Shereef Akeel, torture victim testimony, the healing experiences of a yoga teacher, and was highlighted with artwork by Daniel Heyman. Wild River Review continued with its conversation with Turkish author Orhan Pamuk in an reporting on Article 301 of the Turkish penal code for insulting Turkishness. Also WRR covered artist Michael D. Fay's, and Fay and photographer Suzanne Opton's The Human Face of War, exhibited in 2007 at the James A. Michener Art Museum.

In 2009, WRR began covering LIVE from the NYPL hosted by Paul Holdengraber.

In 2011, Kimberly Nagy and Joy E. Stocke interviewed Holdengraber in The Afterlife of Conversation

Coverage of a Lindisfarne Association Symposium, founded by cultural philosopher William Irwin Thompson and held in Santa Fe, New Mexico, is collected in a section called Lindisfarne Cafe and includes profiles of Mary Catherine Bateson, Ralph Abraham, Roshi Joan Halifax, and others.

Beginning in 2012, WRR began covering environmental issues. In 2014, Joy E. Stocke and Kim Nagy covered the proposed PennEast Natural Gas Pipeline from the Marcellus Shale through the farming communities of western New Jersey in the Huffington Post - In 2015, the magazine interviewed Marine biologist Sylvia Earle on the struggle in Cabo Plum, Baja Our to save its fragile coral reef.
