= White Horse, Bucks County, Pennsylvania =

Unincorporated community in Pennsylvania, U.S.

Coordinates: 40°22′28″N 75°18′44″W

White Horse is an unincorporated community in Bucks County, in the U.S. state of Pennsylvania.

== History ==
The community took its name from the White Horse inn, established in 1757.
