= Hagersville, Pennsylvania =

Unincorporated community in Pennsylvania, US

- Populated place
- Location of Hagersville in Pennsylvania
- Coordinates: 40°24′25″N 75°15′01″W
- Country: United States
- State: Pennsylvania
- County: Bucks
- Elevation: 430 ft (130 m)
- Time zone: UTC-5 (Eastern (EST))
  - Summer (DST): UTC-4 (EDT)
- Area code: 215
- FIPS code: 42-31936
- GNIS feature ID: 1176359

Hagersville is an unincorporated community situated in East Rockhill Township in Bucks County, Pennsylvania, United States. It has an estimated elevation of 427 feet (130 m) above sea level.

== History ==
Hagersville post office was established in 1851, with Francis Gerhard as postmaster. The village was named for Colonel George Hager, who was a politician of local prominence. Samuel Hager, another member of this influential family, was the founder of Perkasie. By the 1870s, Hagersville had a population of approximately 150 and had a store and hotel, as well as blacksmith and wheelwright shops which thrived on the two coach factories also located here. Frederick Heany, son of a Rockhill settler/German immigrant, owned the hotel circa 1875. He is notable as one of the leaders of the Fries Rebellion.
