= Byers' Choice =

Christmas decorations manufacturer

Byers’ Choice Ltd. is an American family-owned and -operated manufacturer of Christmas figures and holiday decorations located in Chalfont, Pennsylvania. The company is best known for its line of Caroler figures. It is a Subchapter S Corporation, and manufactures its product in the United States.

The company produces over 500,000 Carolers annually, which are sold by over 3,000 retailers across the United States, as well as in Canada and Europe.

The company is currently run by Joyce Byers, the founder, and her two sons, Robert and Jeffrey Byers. Joyce’s husband and co-founder Robert Byers Sr. is retired, but still directs the company’s philanthropic efforts.

== History ==
Joyce Byers, a former fashion designer and artist, created her first Carolers after a trip to London where she saw winter scenes on display in many shop windows. When she returned home to Pennsylvania, she began to craft her own Christmas figures out of wire, newspaper, fabric, and clay which she found in her home.

Joyce used the Carolers to decorate around her own home at Christmas; many visitors commented on how much they liked the figures and asked where they had come from. With the help of her husband Robert and their two sons, Joyce spent the next several autumns making new Carolers to give as gifts for friends and family members.

In the early 1970s Joyce offered some of her creations for sale at a local Women’s Exchange and later at other local stores. Within several years, Joyce and her family alone could no longer keep up with the demand and hired several art students to work during the summer to help Joyce fill orders. The family and their employees set up shop amid sheep and geese in their barnyard and made as many Carolers as they could to send to stores during the upcoming Christmas.

Byers’ Choice Ltd. was formally created several years later, in 1978, and the company soon after hired a national sales representative and began selling the Carolers across the country.

== Carolers ==
=== Production ===
Joyce Byers continues to design the Carolers, creating a unique style for each line of figures. She sculpts an original head which will be used to create a mold for the heads in the line and designs the clothing which will be used as a template for all of the Carolers in the line. The body of each Caroler is made of tissue paper wrapped around a skeleton made of bent wire.

The molds of Joyce’s original heads are filled with clay to make each head. As each head comes out of the mold, artisans add finishing touches such as nostrils and lips to each head before painting it and adding eyes, eyebrows, and coloring.

The heads and bodies are then given over to dressers, who take fabric specially cut to meet Joyce’s designs and use it to dress each figure before attaching the head and hair, finishing the piece.

=== Designs ===
Although Byers’ Choice still makes traditional Carolers similar to the original Victorian-style Christmas Carolers, they have expanded their line of products to include a variety of other holidays, themes, and styles including many spring and autumn pieces themed around Easter, Halloween, and Thanksgiving. The company has also created a number of specialty pieces based on classic stories including Charles Dickens’ A Christmas Carol and the ballet The Nutcracker. There is also a line of collectable models of antique automobiles.

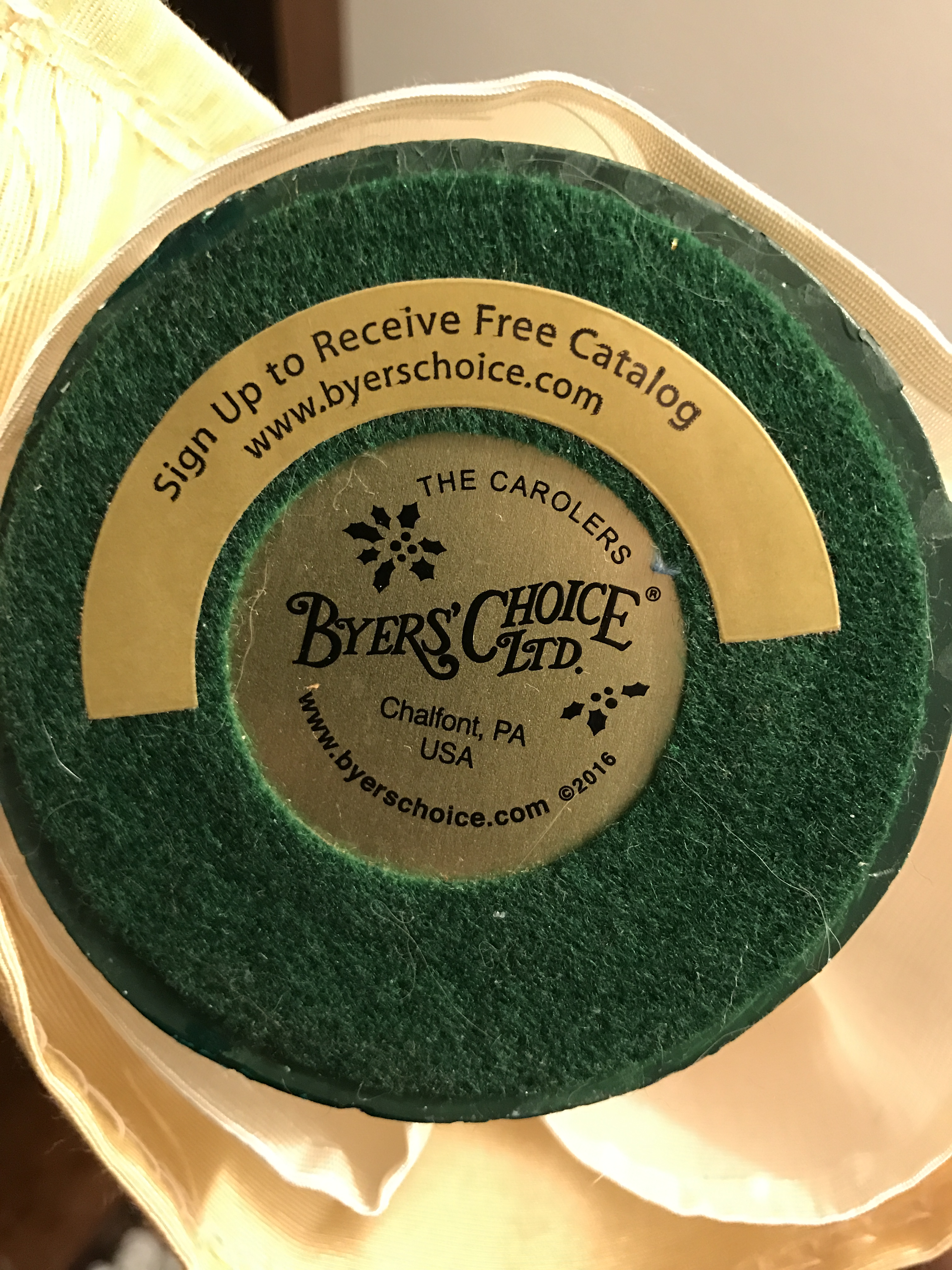
Similar stamp designs are found on the bottom of every Caroler

In 1992 the company worked with the Salvation Army to create a Caroler depicting an iconic Salvation Army red kettle and bell ringer. Byers’ Choice continues to produce Salvation Army Carolers and donates a portion of the proceeds from their sale to the organization.

Byers’ Choice has also collaborated with the Colonial Williamsburg Foundation to create a line of pieces depicting characters from Revolutionary-era Virginia which are sold by the foundation and other retailers.

== Philanthropy ==
In 1986 the Byers Family started the Byers’ Foundation, a charitable organization. The foundation regularly donates to the Salvation Army, the YMCA, Covenant House, and Habitat for Humanity. The company was selected as one of the ten finalists in the 1999 Newman’s Own/George magazine search for American company that best exemplifies good citizenship through philanthropy, and in 2000, Bob Sr. and Joyce Byers were honored by the Caring Institute "for their values-driven corporate philosophy and random acts of kindness."

== Internet ==
The company was involved in a court case when an unrelated person registered the domain name "buyerschoice.com", and this case is used as an example of internet law in the United States.
