= Pine Run (North Branch Neshaminy Creek tributary) =

- Pine Run

Location
- Country: United States
- State: Pennsylvania
- County: Bucks
- Township: New Britain; Buckingham; Plumstead
- Borough: Chalfont

Physical characteristics
- Source
  - coordinates: 40°21′53″N 75°6′0″W
  - elevation: 340 feet (100 m)
- Mouth
  - coordinates: 40°17′20″N 75°12′12″W
  - elevation: 249 feet (76 m)
- Length: 7.84 miles (12.62 km)
- Basin size: 11.7 square miles (30 km^{2})

Basin features
- Progression: Pine Run → North Branch Neshaminy Creek → Neshaminy Creek → Delaware River → Delaware Bay
- River system: Delaware River
- Landmarks: Pine Run Dam; Allohaken Park; North Branch Park; Pine Valley Covered Bridge
- Bridges: See table
- Slope: 11.61 feet per mile (2.199 m/km)

Pine Run is a tributary of the North Branch Neshaminy Creek, part of the Delaware River watershed. Pine Run flows entirely in Bucks County, Pennsylvania, rising in Plumstead Township, passing through Buckingham Township and New Britain Township, meeting its confluence with the North Branch in the Borough of Chalfont.

== History ==
Pine Run powered two of the earliest mills in central Bucks County; Dyers Mill at Dyerstown and Butler Mill at Chalfont.

== Statistics ==
The watershed of Pine Run is 11.70 square miles (30.3 km^{2}), its confluence is at the North Branch Neshaminy Creek's 0.45 river mile. The Geographic Name Information System I.D. is 1183891, U.S. Department of the Interior Geological Survey I.D. is 02790.

== Course ==
Rising from an unnamed pond near Landisville in Plumstead Township at an elevation of 340 feet (100 m), it flows to the southwest through Buckingham Township where it meets the Pine Run Dam and lake, then through New Britain Township, then finally into the Borough of Chalfont where it meets with the North Branch of the Neshaminy at an elevation of 249 feet (76 m). Pine Run has a total length of 7.84 miles (12.62 km) resulting in an average slope of 11.61 feet per mile (2.199 m/km).

== Geology ==
- Appalachian Highlands Division
  - Piedmont Province
    - Gettysburg-Newark Lowland Section
      - Stockton Formation
      - Lockatong Formation

Pine Run flows within the Stockton Formation, bedrock laid down during the Triassic, consisting of arkosic sandstone, sandstone, shale, siltstone, and mudstone. Then as it enters Chalfont, it enters the Lockatong Formation, also from the Triassic, consisting of argillite, black shale, limestone, and shale.

== Municipalities ==
- Bucks County
  - Borough of Chalfont
  - New Britain Township
  - Buckingham Township
  - Plumstead Township

== Crossings and bridges ==
| Crossing | NBI Number | Length | Lanes | Spans | Material/Design | Built | Reconstructed | Latitude | Longitude |
|---|---|---|---|---|---|---|---|---|---|
| Bergstrom Road | 48539 | 9.1 metres (30 ft) | 2 | 3 | concrete Culvert | 1990 | - | 40°21'15"N | 75°6'45"W |
| Burnt House Hill Road | 7633 | 8 metres (26 ft) | 2 | 1 | Concrete Culvert | 1984 | - | 40°9'30"N | 75°7'42"W |
| Old Easton Road | 7636 | 14 metres (46 ft) | 2 | 1 | Concrete Tee Beam | 1928 | - | 40°20'32.9"N | 75°7'32.6"W |
| Pennsylvania Route 611 (North Easton Road) | 7097 | 13 metres (43 ft) | 3 | 1 | Concrete Tee Beam | 1938 | - | 40°20'19.4"N | 757'53.47"W |
| Pennsylvania Route 611 (Doylestown Bypass) | 7069 | 14 metres (46 ft) | 2 | 2 | Concrete Culvert | 1973 | - | 40°20'12"N | 75°8'6"W |
| Pennsylvania Route 313 (Swamp Road) | 6984 | 11.9 metres (39 ft) | - | - | Concrete Tee Beam, concrete cast-in-place decking | 1941 | - | 40°20'3"N | 75°8'23"W |
| Old Dublin Pike | 7375 | 25 metres (82 ft) | 2 | 3 | Masonry Arch-deck | 2013 | - | 40°19'52.7"N | 75°8'43.97"W |
| Chapman Road | 7597 | 13 metres (43 ft) | 2 | 2 | Wood or Timber Stringer/Multi-beam or Girder | 1990 | - | 40°19'50.34"N | 75°8'58.56"W |
| Rickert Road | 7508 | 10 metres (33 ft) | 2 | 1 | Concrete continuous, Stringer/Multi-beam or Girder | 1910 | - | 40°19'37.7"N | 75°9'25.8"W |
| Limekiln Road | 7506 | 32.3|m|ft | - | - | Prestressed concrete Tee Beam, concrete cast-in-place decking | 1977 | - | 40°19'22"N | 75°9'38"W |
| Pine Run Dam (Pine Run Reservoir) | - | - | - | - | - | - | - | - | - |
| Old Ironhill Road (Keeley Avenue)(Pine Valley Covered Bridge) | 7499 | 22 metres (72 ft) | 1 | 1 | Steel Stringer/Mulit-beam or Girder | 1906 | 1985 | 40°18'18.6"N | 75°11'13.9"W |

== See also ==
- List of rivers of Pennsylvania
- List of rivers of the United States
- List of Delaware River tributaries
