= Hurricane Isaias (2020) =

Category 1 Atlantic hurricane in 2020

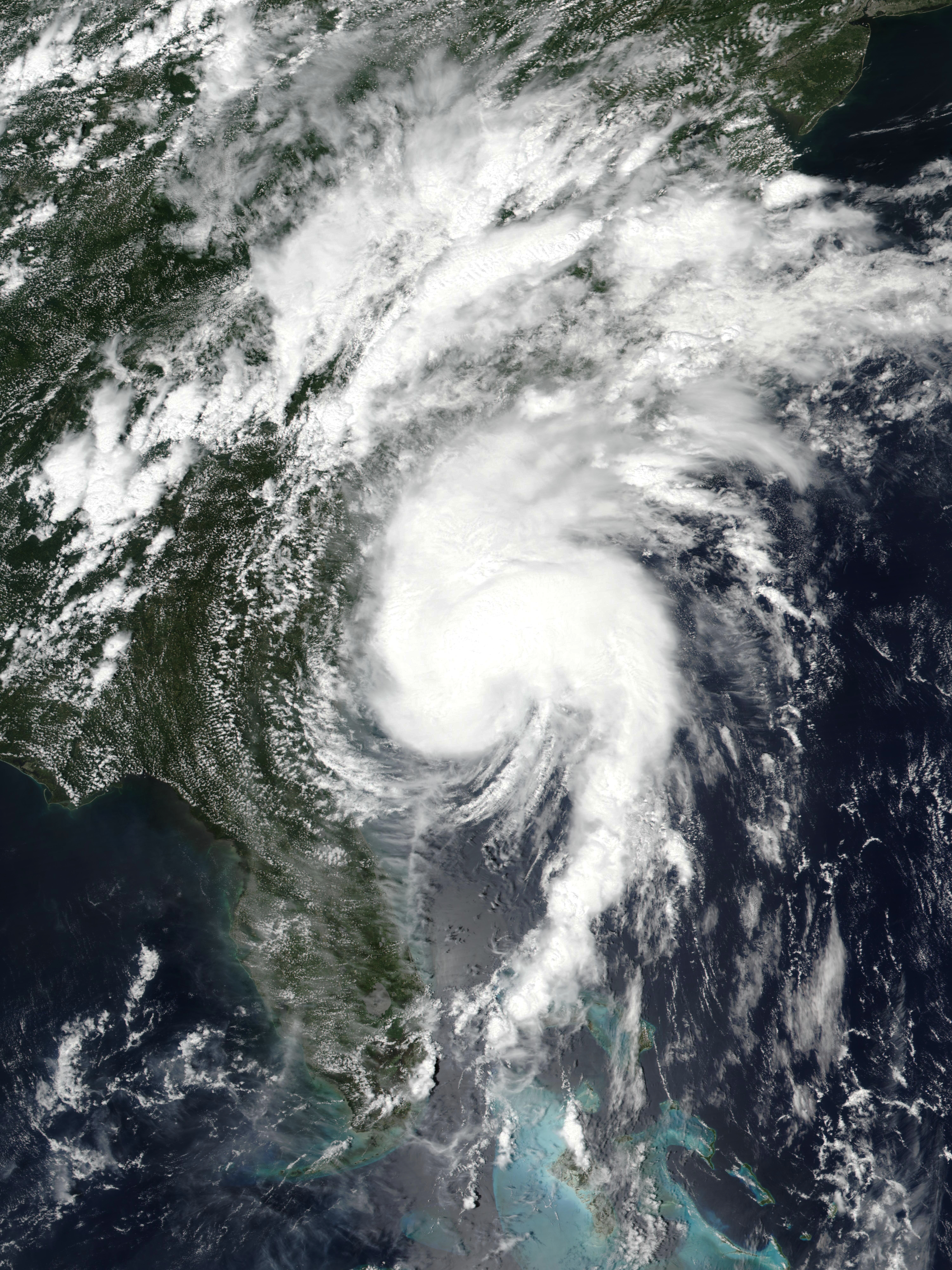
- Hurricane Isaias intensifying near the Carolinas on August 3

Meteorological history
- Formed: July 30, 2020
- Extratropical: August 4, 2020
- Dissipated: August 5, 2020

Category 1 hurricane
- 1-minute sustained (SSHWS/NWS)
- Highest winds: 90 mph (150 km/h)
- Lowest pressure: 986 mbar (hPa); 29.12 inHg

Overall effects
- Fatalities: 17 total
- Damage: $5.03 billion (2020 USD)
- Areas affected: West Africa, Lesser Antilles, Greater Antilles, The Bahamas, East Coast of the United States, Eastern Canada
- IBTrACS
- Part of the 2020 Atlantic hurricane season

Hurricane Isaias (/ˌisɑːˈiːɑːs/ ee-sah-EE-ahss) was a destructive tropical cyclone that caused extensive damage across the Caribbean and the East Coast of the United States while also giving rise to the strongest tropical cyclone-spawned tornado since Hurricane Rita in 2005. The ninth named storm and second hurricane of the extremely active and record-breaking 2020 Atlantic hurricane season, Isaias originated from a vigorous tropical wave off the coast of Africa that was first identified by the National Hurricane Center on July 23. The tropical wave gradually became more organized and obtained gale-force winds on July 28 before organizing into Tropical Storm Isaias on July 30. Isaias marked the earliest ninth named storm on record, surpassing 2005's Hurricane Irene by eight days. Isaias strengthened into a Category 1 hurricane on the next day, reaching an initial peak of 85 mph (140 km/h), with a minimum central pressure of 987 mbar (hPa; 29.15 inHg). On August 1, the storm made landfall on North Andros, Bahamas and subsequently weakened to a tropical storm, before paralleling the east coast of Florida and Georgia. As Isaias approached the Carolina coastline, it reintensified back into a hurricane. Soon afterward, Isaias reached its peak intensity, with maximum 1-minute sustained winds of 90 mph (150 km/h) and a minimum central pressure of 986 millibars (29.1 inHg), before making landfall near Ocean Isle Beach, North Carolina, at 03:10 UTC on August 4, at the same intensity. The storm proceeded to accelerate up the East Coast of the United States as a strong tropical storm, before transitioning into an extratropical cyclone over Quebec on August 4. Isaias's extratropical remnants persisted for another day, before dissipating on August 5.

Numerous tropical storm watches and warnings as well as hurricane watches and hurricane warnings were issued for the Lesser Antilles, Greater Antilles, Bahamas, Cuba, and the East Coast of the United States. Isaias impacted portions of the Eastern Caribbean and caused significant damage in the Eastern United States. Devastating flooding and wind damage were reported in Puerto Rico and the Dominican Republic, with many towns without electricity or drinking water. Trees were uprooted and power lines were downed in much of the Eastern United States from both damaging winds and tornadoes, with more than 3 million power outages reported, nearly half of them in New Jersey. Isaias was also the second tropical cyclone to affect the Northeastern States in 3 weeks after Tropical Storm Fay in early July. Many people were without power for days after the storm in New York and Connecticut, leading to investigations into power and electricity companies. There were 17 storm-related deaths (direct and indirect): 14 in the contiguous United States, two in the Dominican Republic, and one in Puerto Rico. Overall, Isaias caused approximately $5.025 billion (2020 USD) in damage, with $4.8 billion in damage occurring in the U.S. alone, making Isaias the costliest tropical cyclone to affect the Northeastern United States since Hurricane Sandy in 2012. The Spanish name Isaias was found by many people to be difficult to enunciate, and was mispronounced by some weather forecasters in the United States. Isaias was one of several destructive 2020 hurricanes whose names were not retired following the season by the World Meteorological Organization, along with Sally, Delta, and Zeta.

== Meteorological history ==
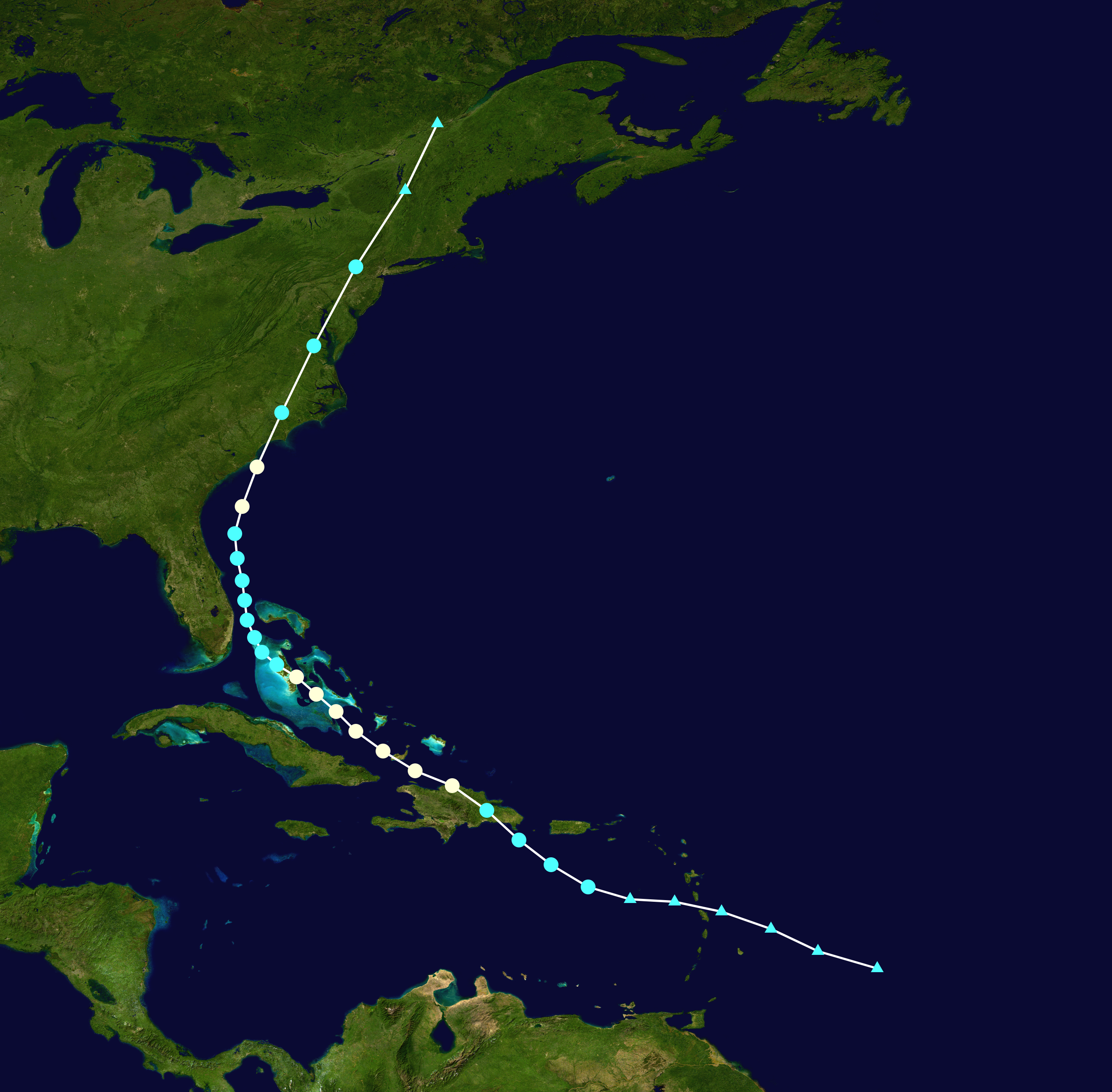
Map plotting the storm's track and intensity, according to the Saffir–Simpson scale Map key Saffir–Simpson scale Tropical depression (≤38 mph, ≤62 km/h) Tropical storm (39–73 mph, 63–118 km/h) Category 1 (74–95 mph, 119–153 km/h) Category 2 (96–110 mph, 154–177 km/h) Category 3 (111–129 mph, 178–208 km/h) Category 4 (130–156 mph, 209–251 km/h) Category 5 (≥157 mph, ≥252 km/h) Unknown Storm type Tropical cyclone Subtropical cyclone Extratropical cyclone, remnant low, tropical disturbance, or monsoon depression

The National Hurricane Center (NHC) first began tracking a vigorous tropical wave off the west coast of Africa on July 23. The wave gradually organized and became better defined, developing a broad area of low pressure on July 25. Though the circulation was broad and disorganized, convection continued to increase over the system, and the system obtained gale-force winds on July 28. Although the system still lacked a well-defined center, an imminent threat of tropical cyclogenesis and tropical storm-force winds to land areas prompted its designation as Potential Tropical Cyclone Nine at 15:00 UTC on July 28. The system moved just south of Dominica on July 29, and at 03:00 UTC on the following day, the system organized sufficiently to become a tropical cyclone. Due to its precursor disturbance already having gale-force winds, it was immediately declared a tropical storm and given the name Isaias. When Tropical Storm Isaias developed, it became the earliest ninth named storm on record, breaking the record of Hurricane Irene in 2005 by eight days. Isaias continued strengthening after reaching tropical storm status, with 1-minute sustained winds reaching 60 mph (97 km/h) on July 30 as it made landfall on the southern coast of the Dominican Republic. Contrary to predictions by meteorologists, the mountainous terrain of Hispaniola did not weaken the storm as the system had a broad circulation and developed a new low-pressure center to the north of the island, allowing Isaias to maintain its intensity.

Early the next day, hurricane hunters unexpectedly found that Isaias had strengthened into a hurricane. After fluctuating between 75–80 mph (121–129 km/h) for 18 hours, Isaias reached its initial peak intensity with, 1-minute sustained winds of 85 mph (137 km/h) and a minimum central pressure of 987 mbar (29.1 inHg). Moderate to strong southwesterly wind shear and dry air entrainment began affecting the storm a few hours later, resulting in the low-level circulation center (LLCC) being exposed near the western edge of the convection. After a brief weakening trend, Isaias began to intensify again, with deep convection firing over the exposed center and an eye feature forming, as seen on Bahamian radar. Later that evening, data from another hurricane hunter reconnaissance aircraft confirmed a closed eyewall and a lower minimal central pressure of 987 mbar (29.1 inHg). The storm strengthened afterwards to reach another peak, with 1-minute sustained winds of 85 mph (137 km/h), despite a somewhat ragged appearance on satellite imagery. At 15:00 UTC on August 1, Isaias made landfall on Northern Andros Island, Bahamas with sustained winds of 80 mph (130 km/h), slightly weaker than its peak. Land interaction and the continued effects of wind shear and dry air continued to weaken the system, and Isaias dropped below hurricane strength at 21:00 UTC, as its center became completely devoid of convection, although a large burst of convection formed over the center shortly after it moved back over water.

As the storm approached South Florida, a strong mid-level circulation formed just northeast of the storm's low-level circulation center, spawning intense convection mainly north and east of the LLCC. The storm then paralleled the east coast of Florida and Georgia, with its winds fluctuating between 65–70 mph (105–113 km/h). As the storm turned northeastward, it entered a more favorable environment for strengthening, with wind shear relaxing just enough to allow the storm to redevelop intense convection. The storm began to quickly reintensify, regaining hurricane status at 18:00 UTC on August 3, before reaching its peak intensity, with 1-minute sustained winds of 90 mph (140 km/h) and a minimum central pressure of 986 mbar (29.1 inHg). At 03:10 UTC on August 4, the hurricane made landfall near Ocean Isle Beach, North Carolina at the same intensity. With its landfall, Isaias became the earliest fifth named storm to make landfall in the United States. The previous record for the earliest fifth storm to make a U.S. landfall was August 18, set during the 1916 season. Following landfall, Isaias continued to accelerate and only weakened slowly, dropping below hurricane status at 07:00 UTC over North Carolina. Isaias moved quickly to the north-northeast, crossing through Virginia, Maryland, Pennsylvania, New Jersey, and then into New York. The system lost tropical characteristics as it merged with a cold front to the west, becoming extratropical at 03:00 UTC on August 5, over southern Quebec, east-southeast of Montreal, with the NHC discontinuing advisories on the storm at 09:00 UTC. Afterward, Isaias's extratropical remnant moved northwestward, before turning eastward on August 6. Later that day, Isaias's low-pressure center split into two separate lows, with the newer low to the east absorbing the original low shortly afterward.

== Preparations ==
Numerous tropical storm, hurricane, and storm surge watches and warnings were issued for areas in the path of Isaias.

=== Antillean Islands ===
The first tropical storm watches and warnings were posted for Puerto Rico, the Virgin Islands, the Leeward Islands, the Dominican Republic, and Haiti when the system was designated Potential Tropical Cyclone Nine.

=== Bahamas ===
With the system approaching and strengthening, hurricane warnings were posted for the Northwestern Bahamas at 00:00 UTC on July 31. The sudden upgrade to hurricane status caused all of the Bahamas to go under a hurricane warning at 03:40 UTC.

People living on Abaco and Grand Bahama islands were evacuated before the storm. Many of the citizens were still living in temporary structures due to damage caused by Hurricane Dorian in 2019. Many of the structures were weak and could be easily destroyed by tropical storm and hurricane-force winds. The meteorology department of the Bahamas advised citizens to "hunker down". The government of the Bahamas lifted the COVID-19 lockdown instituted for controlling the virus before the storm so people could freely travel to safer places. Shelters were opened on larger islands in the island chain, with people on smaller, less populated, islands needing to travel to reach a shelter. Bahamas Power and Light shut off electricity to areas at high risk of flooding on New Providence, the most populous island in the Bahamas, until it was safe to re-energize.

=== United States ===
Once Isaias made landfall late on August 3, several airlines issued flight waivers for flights involving East Coast airports.

==== Southeast ====
Tropical storm watches were first initiated in South Florida at 21:00 UTC on July 30, with more watches and warnings going up as the storm got closer. Hurricane warnings were issued as the storm approached, but they were downgraded to tropical storm warnings when the storm weakened. Hurricane warnings were issued for areas near the South Carolina–North Carolina border after the storm was forecasted to reach minimal hurricane status again just before landfall. At one point, tropical storm watches and warnings extended over 1,000 miles from Florida to Maine. Tornado watches were also issued in Northeastern South Carolina and Eastern North Carolina.

In anticipation of the storm, the state of Florida closed COVID-19 testing sites on July 30 due to potential impacts from Isaias. The next day, Florida governor Ron DeSantis declared a state of emergency for the eastern coast of Florida ahead of Isaias. Both Biscayne National Park and the Everglades National Park closed in preparation for Hurricane Isaias, although Dry Tortugas National Park remained open.

In Georgia, beaches were closed and the Coast Health District suspended all operations. The Sidney Lanier Bridge in Glynn County was closed at 6 a.m. on August 3 as the storm approached. Savannah's Talmadge Memorial Bridge was also scheduled to close at 2 p.m. that day, but remained open. Inspections were planned for both bridges after the storm passed. Cumberland Island National Seashore was closed in preparation of the storm as well.

On July 31, North Carolina governor Roy Cooper declared a state of emergency ahead of the storm. A mandatory evacuation of Ocracoke Island, North Carolina, was issued that same day. Both Cape Lookout National Seashore and Cape Hatteras National Seashore closed ahead of the hurricane on August 1.

==== Mid-Atlantic ====
Tropical storm watches and warnings, as well as flood watches and a tornado watch, were issued as Isaias approached the region. The Storm Prediction Center (SPC) issued a slight risk for severe weather in their 13:00 UTC update for Northeastern South Carolina and Northeastern North Carolina. A day later, the SPC issued an enhanced risk from the Northeastern Delmarva Peninsula to the Tri-State area, east of the forecast track where wind shear was greatest. In the end, a total of 109 tornado warnings were issued by various National Weather Service offices across a swath of 12 states due to Hurricane Isaias.

In Washington, D.C., Cleveland Park Station was shut down in advance due to potential flooding. In Maryland, multiple closures were announced for August 4 due to the storm's passage, including the Maryland Zoo. All coronavirus testing was halted and multiple counties postponed trash pickups. Free sandbags were also handed out to Baltimore residents and some city parking garages allowed cars to be stored in them during the storm free of charge as well. Further north, Hershey Park announced they were closing for the day due to the storm.

==== Northeast ====
Just before the storm arrived, governor Phil Murphy declared a state of emergency for the entire state of New Jersey. New York Governor Andrew Cuomo declared a state of emergency for 14 counties after the event occurred.

In New Jersey and Connecticut, every single state park was closed before the storm, and all campgrounds were emptied in New Jersey as well. The New Jersey Transit was shut down on August 4 as well. New York City mayor Bill de Blasio stated in a press conference on July 31 that the city would be monitoring the storm, but that the projections looked "pretty favorable". On August 2, in a press call with reporters, Cuomo said, in conjunction with a press release by New York City Emergency Management, that models showed Isaias hitting the NYC and Long Island area with sustained winds of 50 to 65 miles per hour (80 to 105 km/h) and 3 to 6 inches (75 to 150 mm) of rain by Tuesday August 4. On August 3, the National Weather Service issued a tropical storm warning for the New York City metro, with Emergency Management issuing a travel advisory that evening, stating that the strongest of the storm would be from 12 to 2 p.m. EDT on August 4. The MTA suspended all above ground rail service, including the Long Island Railroad, on the morning of August 4 as well. On the morning of August 4, a tornado watch was issued for New York City, Long Island, New Jersey, and a portion of Connecticut. The National Park Service shut down Martin Van Buren National Historic Site due to a forecast of heavy rain and winds over 40 mph (64 km/h). A game between the New York Yankees and Philadelphia Phillies was postponed due to the storm.

Tropical storm watches were issued for the New England states as the storm began to move up the coast of Florida before being upgraded into warnings as the storm accelerated towards the region. A tornado watch was also issued for Southern New England on the afternoon of August 4. Flood watches were also issued for western portions of the region.

=== Canada ===
On the morning of August 4, Environment Canada's Hurricane Forecasting Center estimated that Isaias, as a post-tropical storm, would pass through Montérégie and the Cantons de l'Est in the evening and reach the Quebec region on Wednesday morning. 30–50 mm (1.2–2.0 in) of rain were expected.

== Impacts ==
There were 12 fatalities directly related to Isaias in the Caribbean Islands and eastern United States (10 in the eastern U.S., one in Puerto Rico, and one in the Dominican Republic). Among them, six were due to wind, three were drownings due to freshwater flooding, two were the result of tornadoes and one was a drowning due to a rip current. Additionally, five indirect deaths (four in the U.S. and one in the Dominican Republic) were attributable to the storm. Overall, Isaias caused approximately $5.025 billion (2020 USD) in damage ($224.8 million in the Caribbean Islands and $4.8 billion in the U.S.).

=== Caribbean ===
Most of the Caribbean islands were suffering from moderate to severe drought conditions from an unusually dry spring and early summer. The drought was particularly severe in Puerto Rico and the Dominican Republic, with the governor of Puerto Rico declaring a state of emergency in late June and ordering rationing of water, subjecting residents in affected areas to 24-hour water shutoffs every other day. Heavy rain from Isaias and its precursor disturbance alleviated drought in many areas of the Caribbean.

==== Lesser Antilles ====
The precursor disturbance to Isaias brought squally conditions to the Windward Islands. Rainfall peaked at 3.13 inches (80 mm) in the town of Salisbury, on the island of Dominica.

==== Greater Antilles ====
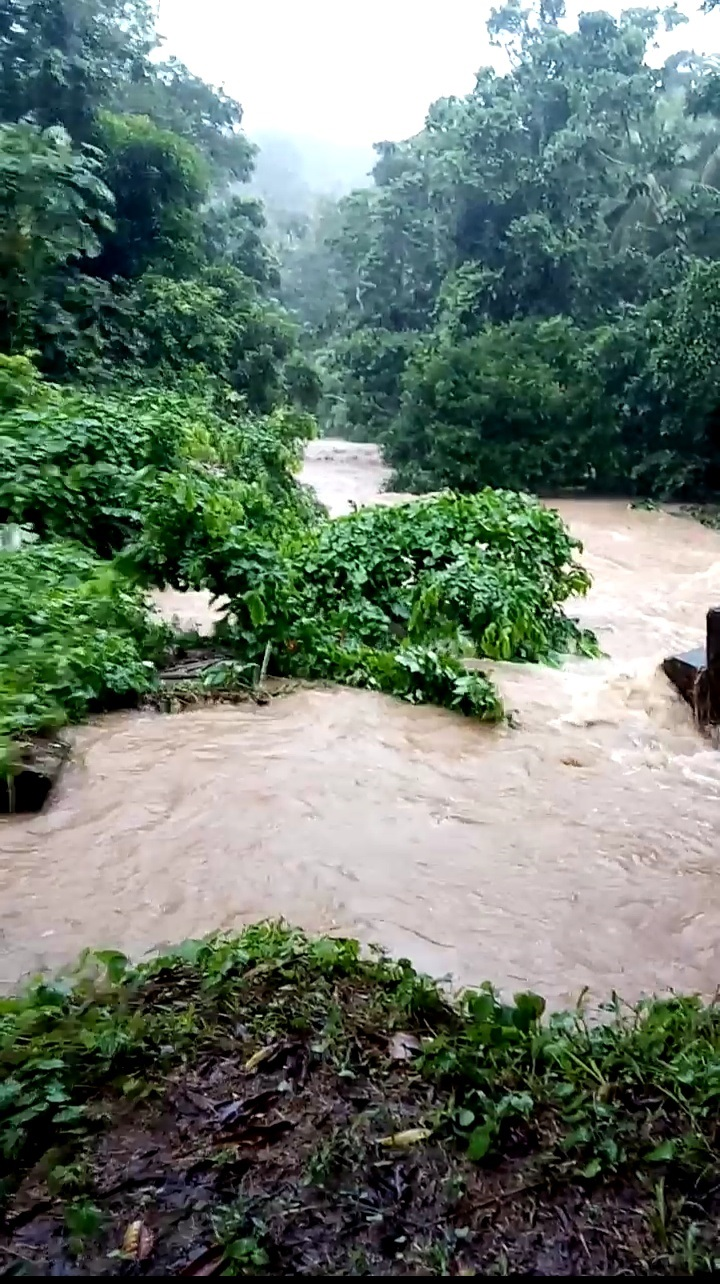
Pitahaya River in Luquillo, a northern municipality of Puerto Rico, on August 1 after being flooded by Isaias's rains.

In Puerto Rico, about 448,000 people and 23 hospitals lost power and about 150,000 people lost water service due to electric blackouts and blocked intakes. The entire city of Yauco had no power, and all roads leading to the town were either flooded or blocked by fallen trees. Many surrounding towns in eastern Puerto Rico also had no drinking water nor electricity from a lack of access to the areas of damage. Three gates on the Carraízo reservoir dam in Trujillo Alto, Puerto Rico, were opened because of runoff from Isaias. A woman was dragged by a river in Rincón, Puerto Rico while she was crossing a bridge due to heavy rain; she was found dead two days later. Jayuya, a town in the center of Puerto Rico experienced substantial effects including the loss of its 1.5 million dollar hot air balloon, an important tourist attraction. Due to the extensive damage, President Donald Trump approved an emergency declaration request from Puerto Rico's governor Wanda Vázquez Garced. Mayagüez, one of the hardest-hit municipalities, saw damage exceeding $13 million. Damage to agriculture across the territory reached $47.5 million.

One person was killed in El Seibo Province, in the Dominican Republic, when a power line fell on his horse a few feet away from him, killing him and the animal. A 5-year-old boy was also killed when a tree fell and crushed his home in Altamira in Puerto Plata province. Widespread flooding was reported in Hato Mayor del Rey, a town of 70,000 inhabitants. The storm had limited effects in neighboring Haiti with damage reported to a few homes and crops.

=== Bahamas ===
Isaias passed over the Bahamas from July 31 to August 1, hitting some areas still recovering from the devastation of Hurricane Dorian a year before. Tropical storm-force winds and heavy rain damaged roofs and toppled trees. Winds gusted up to 62 mph (100 km/h) in Freeport. Initial damage assessments began on August 2, with reports indicating damage in the Berry Islands and Andros Island was generally minor.

=== United States ===
Hurricane Isaias making landfall near Ocean Isle Beach, North Carolina as seen on weather radar.

Isaias caused over 2.7 million power outages along the East Coast, with almost half of them occurring in New Jersey. Total damage across the United States amounted to $4.8 billion. Of that total, $3.5 billion was in the Northeastern United States alone. Across the Mid-Atlantic states, Isaias was influenced by an approaching cold front, which enhanced wind shear and created conditions favorable for tornadoes. The hurricane spawned at least 39 tornadoes, including one rated an EF3 on the Enhanced Fujita scale, and seven rated an EF2.

==== Florida ====
The outer rainbands of Isaias began to impact the Florida Peninsula on August 1, bringing gusty winds, heavy rainfall, and flooding to the area. There were some reports of power outages due to downed power lines, but damage was mostly minor and far less than originally expected due to a weakened Isaias, with 27,400 customers affected in South Florida. In Jacksonville, rough surf forced 5 people to be rescued on August 1. The Roosevelt Bridge closed due to high winds on the night of August 1.

==== The Carolinas ====
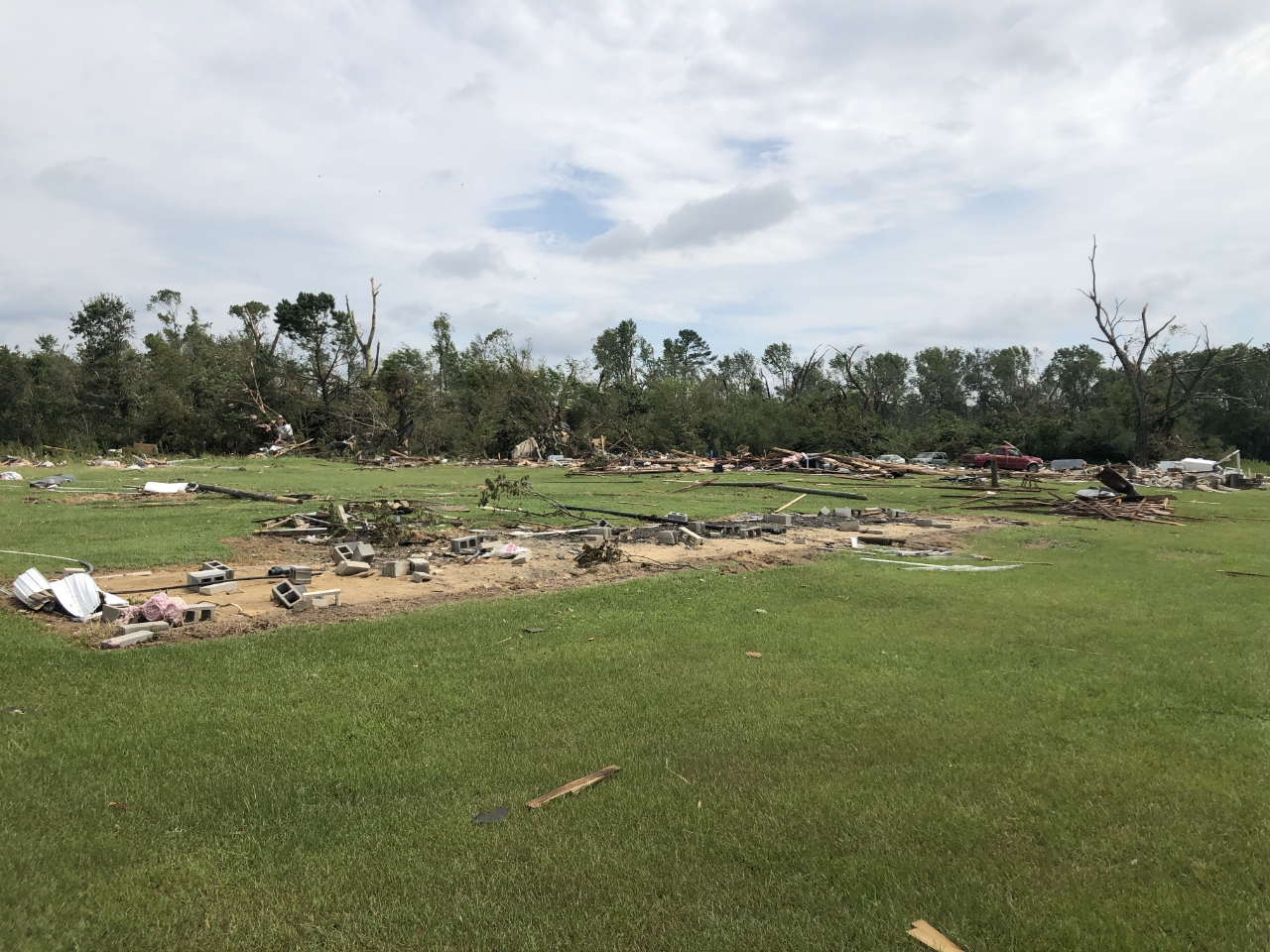
Mobile homes destroyed near Windsor, North Carolina by an EF3 tornado.

Hurricane Isaias generated the third highest high tide ever recorded in Myrtle Beach, South Carolina. In North Myrtle Beach, South Carolina alone, 483 properties suffered damage; losses exceeded $2.4 million in the city. A waterspout moved ashore Garden City Beach, South Carolina, damaging a few beachfront homes and causing an injury.

Costliest Non-retired Hurricanes
Rank	Cyclone	Season	Damage
1	Sally	2020	$7.3 billion
2	Isaias	2020	$5.02 billion
3	Imelda	2019	$5.0 billion
4	Debby	2024	$4.5 billion
5	Zeta	2020	$4.4 billion
6	Karl	2010	$3.9 billion
7	Idalia	2023	$3.6 billion
8	Isaac	2012	$3.11 billion
9	Delta	2020	$3.09 billion
10	Lee	2011	$2.8 billion

Throughout the Carolinas, over 400,000 people lost power at the height of the storm, mostly in North Carolina. Heavy damage was inflicted to multiple homes in Oak Island and Ocean Isle Beach, North Carolina, including three that were destroyed in the latter community by a large fire. Damage in Holden Beach alone exceeded $40 million. Trees and power lines were knocked down in Myrtle Grove, North Carolina, by the rapidly-forming northern eyewall as the storm came ashore. At least 109 baby sea turtles were found dead in North Myrtle Beach following the storm's landfall.

The strongest tornado of the outbreak first touched down in Bertie County, North Carolina just north of the Roanoke River, and rapidly intensified as it moved northwest. As it reached Middle Track Road, the tornado reached its peak intensity, completely destroying three mobile homes, a barn, and a single-story frame home at EF3 strength. The frame home was completely leveled but was not anchored to its foundation. The tornado maintained its strength while reaching its peak width as it struck a mobile home park along Morning Road. A dozen mobile homes were destroyed, and several others were severely damaged. Some of the mobile homes were obliterated, with their metal frames twisted and the debris scattered long distances through a nearby field. Several vehicles were tossed in this area as well. There were two fatalities and 14 injuries related to the tornado. The tornado then continued northwestward and weakened slightly to EF2 intensity, flattening a large swath of trees and causing significant damage to some homes in neighborhoods along or just off of Woodward Road. The tornado weakened further to EF1 strength as it damaged multiple businesses and homes along the concurrent US 17/Bypass US 17 and US 13 just west of Windsor. Several farm buildings were damaged northwest of Windsor before the tornado dissipated along NC 308. A total of 14 people were injured. This was strongest tornado spawned by a tropical cyclone since 2005. After the storm, North Carolina Governor Roy Cooper, toured the mobile home park hit by the tornado in Windsor, saying it was "devastating" to see what happened to the area.

In addition to the EF3 tornado, there were 13 tornadoes across North Carolina. The first tornado of the outbreak occurred when a strong waterspout moved onshore in Bald Head Island, North Carolina. There, homes lost roofing and had windows blown in, and a swath of large trees was flattened. It crossed the Cape Fear River, before coming onshore again in Southport. Homes and businesses were damaged, and trees were snapped or uprooted in that area. The tornado dissipated after a path of 8.3 mi (13.4 km). There were four other tornadoes in Brunswick County that damaged houses or trees, including one that moved through the Green Swamp. Three EF1 tornadoes touched down in Beaufort County, including one that moved through Goose Creek State Park, and another that moved through Bayview, which knocked trees onto vehicles and trees. Tornadoes in Kennel Beach and Jamesville also knocked trees onto houses. An EF0 tornado near Chowan University in Murfreesboro, North Carolina generated a TDS as it caused widespread tree damage, prompting a PDS tornado warning. There was also a weak tornado that snapped limbs and downed a few trees to the northeast of Mill Neck, North Carolina.

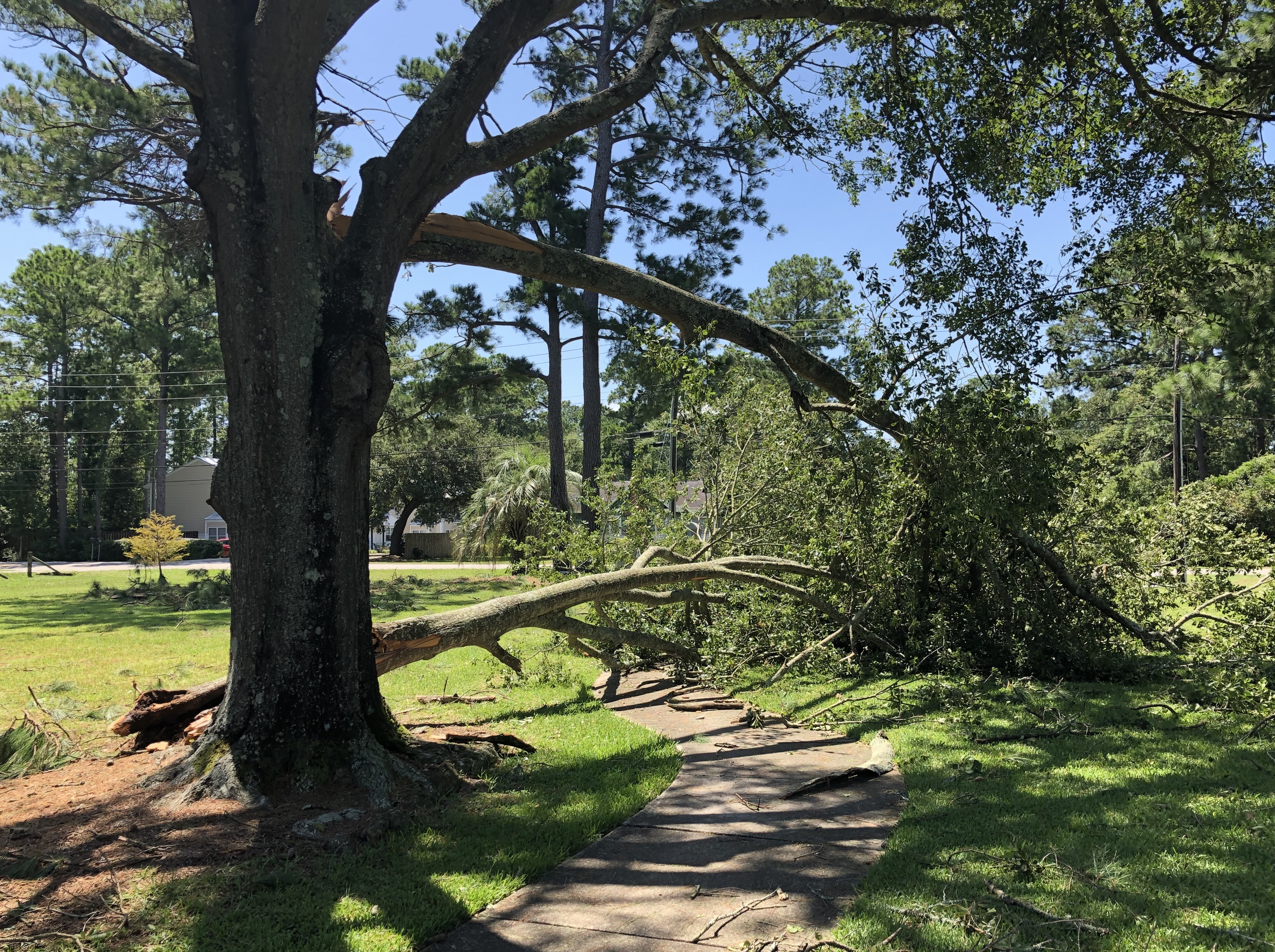
Tree downed by Isaias in Wilmington, North Carolina.

Isaias indirectly led to the death of two people in Wilmington, North Carolina, on August 5. Both men were clearing debris when lightning from a thunderstorm struck and killed them.

==== Mid-Atlantic ====
Across Virginia and Maryland, Isaias left about 400,000 people without power. Nearly 100,000 residences lost power in Delaware. One person was killed after a tree fell on his moving vehicle in St. Mary's County, Maryland. A woman in Milford, Delaware, was killed when a tree branch struck her while she was surveying damage. A storm related death was reported in Lancaster County, Virginia without further details. High winds overturned three tractor-trailers along the US 50 bridge over the Choptank River in Cambridge, Maryland. Winds from the storm caused roof damage and downed trees and wires in Ocean City, Maryland. In the Delaware beach towns in Sussex County, winds from the storm knocked down trees, signs, and wires. Damage to the beaches was minimal. The storm caused heavy wind damage to homes, trees, and fences in a neighborhood in Bear, Delaware.

There were seven tornadoes in Virginia. An EF2 near Courtland damaged numerous homes and businesses along US 58, including a hotel, which sustained total roof loss and collapse of multiple second-story exterior walls. Multiple industrial buildings and a gas station were severely damaged as well. Many trees were snapped or uprooted, and several vehicles were overturned. Overall, this tornado caused $12 million in damages. Another EF2 tornado touched down in Lancaster County. In the rural community of Antipoison Neck, multiple homes sustained significant roof and exterior wall damage. The tornado weakened as it struck the eastern part of Kilmarnock, causing damage to roofs, siding, and trees. The tornado continued to cause roof and tree damage as it moved to the north before dissipating. Five people were injured. The tornado caused $3 million in damages. An EF1 tornado moved through the Great Dismal Swamp before striking Downtown Suffolk. Eight buildings were significantly damaged in the downtown area, including a multi-story brick building that sustained collapse of an exterior wall. Homes were also damaged in residential areas, a few of which had sections of roofing torn off. Many trees were uprooted or snapped along the path as well, some of which landed on structures. Around the same time, there was also an EF0 tornado that hit the western side of Suffolk. Damage was limited to trees being uprooted or snapped. The two tornadoes damaged or destroyed 110 structures in Suffolk with losses estimated at $2.2 million. The tornadoes were responsible for shutting down portions of U.S. Route 58. Three tornadoes in Virginia originated as waterspouts, which damaged roofs and garages.

There were ten tornadoes in Maryland, the most outside of North Carolina. An EF2 tornado touched down just west of Mardela Springs, which damaged several homes, as well as a car repair shop. The tornado also wrecked several sheds. Another EF2 tornado hit George Island Landing, which destroyed a few chicken houses. A camper and a number of outbuildings were overturned and tossed, and several homes on the edge of the path had partial roof loss and blown out windows. The tornado weakened after that, causing minor tree damage on the east side of Girdletree before dissipating. An EF1 tornado in Solomons knocked trees onto recreational vehicles, as well as onto several recreational facilities at a U.S. Navy compound. A waterspout moved onshore at Plum Point as an EF1 tornado, downing many trees and several power lines. Three houses sustained damage from fallen trees, and a fourth house had windows blown out. An EF1 tornado snapped or uprooted numerous trees near Piney Point, some of which fell on and damaged homes and a shed. A camper was also blown over. There were two EF0 tornadoes in Worcester, one of which knocked a tree onto a home. An EF0 tornado developed over the Wicomico River and hit Quantico. It caused minor damage to several homes. There was also an EF0 tornado in both St. Mary's and Queen Anne's counties.

There were three tornadoes in Delaware, including an EF2 that touched down on the southern side of Dover, and took a 35.78 mi (57.58 km), becoming the longest-tracked tornado in state history. The tornado caused significant damage to trees near Dover, some of which fell on homes. The tornado crossed US 13, where it blew off sections of roofing at a middle school. A nearby warehouse had metal walls torn off, and some tractor trailers were blown onto their sides. A garage was also severely damaged. Damage along this first segment of the path was rated EF1. Past Dover, the tornado produced intermittent tree damage before impacting the east side of Smyrna, where more significant tree damage occurred. A weather station run by DelDOT measured a 96 mph (154 km/h) wind gust on DE 1 north of Smyrna as the tornado passed by. The tornado destroyed a car repair facility on the south end of Smyrna and damaged numerous houses. The tornado then nearly paralleled US 13 and DE 1 through the eastern side of Townsend at high-end EF1 strength, causing considerable damage to homes and businesses. Numerous trees were snapped or uprooted, and a garage was also destroyed. The most intense damage in Townsend occurred within the vicinity of Blackbird Landing Road and Gum Bush Road. The tornado then reached low-end EF2 intensity as it struck Middletown, where many homes near Spring Hollow Drive sustained significant roof, exterior wall, and garage door damage. A few of these homes sustained at least partial exterior wall loss, including one poorly constructed home that had an entire second-floor exterior wall ripped off. Low-end EF2 damage continued near Summit Bridge as multiple additional homes sustained considerable damage to the north of Middletown, one of which had half of its roof torn off. Many trees were snapped, and several other homes lost portions of their roofs in this area. Farther along the path, the tornado maintained low-end EF2 intensity as it tracked near Lums Pond and through portions of Bear, where more homes were damaged, and trees were downed. The most significant damage along this segment of the path occurred as the tornado crossed DE 896 and into the Brennan Estates subdivision, where 12 homes were damaged to the point where they were declared uninhabitable. The tornado then rapidly weakened and finally lifted to the southwest of Glasgow, just prior to crossing into Cecil County, Maryland. The other two tornadoes in the state were both rated an EF1. In Sandtown, a tornado damaged several homes as well as a garage. The other tornado knocked down a few trees onto homes near Milford. Flooding on Interstate 95 resulted in a sinkhole on the highway being formed. Throughout the state of Delaware, damage is estimated to be in excess of $20 million.

==== Pennsylvania ====
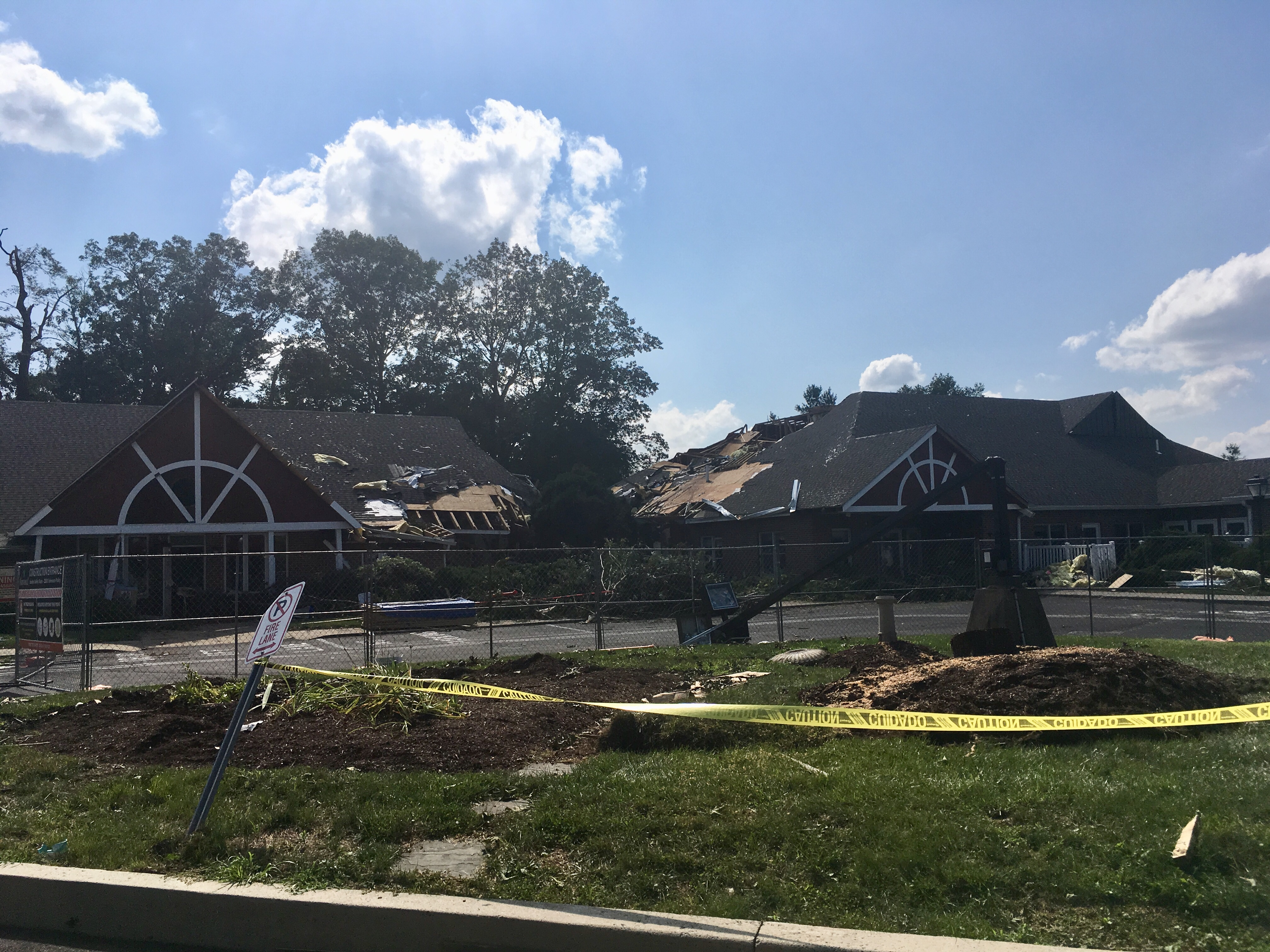
Damage from an EF2 tornado spawned by Isaias at Doylestown Hospital.

In Pennsylvania, widespread flooding occurred in the Philadelphia metropolitan area. The worst of the flooding occurred in Harleysville, Pennsylvania with a total of 8.86 in (225 mm) being recorded, with 4.16 in (106 mm) of rain falling at Philadelphia International Airport. The on and off-ramps of I-95 at Broad Street were closed due to flooding. Water rescues were made in Belmont Hills and Chadds Ford. In Prospect Park, flooding occurred along Lincoln Avenue. The Perkiomen Creek in Graterford, Pennsylvania crested at a record-high of 19.4 feet (5.9 m), with streets flooding in Collegeville, Pennsylvania. The storm caused flooding along the Schuylkill River in the Manayunk neighborhood of Philadelphia, with residents of an apartment complex evacuated. An unsecured barge along the Schuylkill River in Philadelphia broke loose from flooding caused by the storm and struck the Vine Street Expressway Bridge that carries I-676 across the river, causing a portion of the freeway to be closed and SEPTA Regional Rail service to be suspended. A 44-year-old woman died when her vehicle was swept downstream in a flooded area of Upper Saucon Township and a child was found dead in Towamencin Township, Pennsylvania after going missing during the height of the storm. Further west, rainfall of 4.92 in (125 mm) in Allentown led to their wettest August day in history. Over 364,000 customers lost power in the state.

There were two tornadoes in the state. An intermittent EF2 tornado first touched down just east of the Philadelphia Mills shopping mall in Northeast Philadelphia, and moved northwest at EF1 strength. At a former Walmart building undergoing reconstruction, three exhaust systems and six RTU systems were blown off the roof. Roofing, siding and awnings were blown off many homes in the area, and some cars were either tossed or flipped. Trees were snapped or uprooted, including some which were over 100 years old. The tornado then lifted before briefly touching down in Southampton at a slightly weaker low-end EF1 intensity. Numerous trees and tree limbs were snapped, including some that damaged homes and cars. After lifting again, the tornado touched down a third time at its peak intensity of low-end EF2 in Doylestown. Bleachers on the visitors' side of an athletic field at Central Bucks High School West were tossed before the tornado hit the Doylestown Hospital complex, tossing numerous vehicles in a parking lot. Some of these vehicles were piled atop one another, and six were thrown considerable distances. The tornado then struck the Children's Village Day Care center, causing significant damage as large portions of roof structure were torn from the building. Debris from this location was strewn through a nearby field. Numerous large trees were snapped or uprooted in Doylestown, and several metal light posts were bent to the ground. The tornado weakened back to EF1 intensity as it continued northwest, damaging homes and other properties, and snapping or uprooting trees. The tornado then lifted for the final time along Ferry Road near Lake Galena in Peace Valley Park. There were six minor injuries. There was also an EF0 tornado in Worcester Township, Pennsylvania that damaged power poles and trees.

==== New Jersey ====
Isaias was the second tropical cyclone to affect the two states in a 3-week time span after Tropical Storm Fay in early July. In New Jersey, the storm spawned a tornado that brought winds as high as 109 mph (175 km/h) just off the coast in Long Beach Island, as well as heavy rainfall up to 5.41 in (137 mm) causing numerous power outages. Wind gusts peaked at 75 mph (121 km/h) in Cape May and Berkeley Township, located in the southern portion of the state, while gusts peaked at 68 mph (109 km/h) at Newark Airport and 59 mph (95 km/h) at Morristown Airport, both located in the northern portion of the state. Winds from the storm brought down a church steeple in Ocean City. A storm surge of 2.7 ft (0.82 m) occurred in Atlantic City. In Wildwood, numerous businesses and motels lost their roofs due to wind gusts over 70 miles per hour (110 km/h). Service on multiple NJ Transit rail lines was suspended due to storm damage. In Livingston, more than 100 trees were felled by the storm, including one on Route 10, blocking traffic. A 21-year-old man drowned off the coast of Cape May, New Jersey, due to strong rip currents and rough surf. A man in River Vale, New Jersey was killed after possibly being electrocuted from downed wires, while doing yard work to clean up from the storm. Large power outages were reported, largely in Atlantic City Electric-controlled areas. The entirety of New Jersey recorded 1.3 million power outages.

Two tornadoes were confirmed to have touched down in the state. The first originated as a waterspout, before coming onshore on the south end of Corson's Inlet State Park near Strathmere. The tornado then crossed Garden State Parkway and tracked along US 9 through the southern side of Marmora. Homes and businesses were significantly damaged, including some which lost their roofs, and some which had significant damage done to their side or corner walls. One home was shifted off its foundation. Near a Coca-Cola facility, the tornado tossed containers and flipped a tractor trailer. A large shed was upended and vehicles were pushed. Trees were snapped or uprooted, including some which fell on cars, crushing them. The other tornado originated as a waterspout over Manahawkin Bay between Ship Bottom and Brant Beach. It crossed the Route 72 bridge over the bay, before coming onshore near Mud City in mainly marshy areas. Other than some light debris seen flying over the bay bridge, no damage was found. However, a weather station located north of Egg Island measured a wind gust of 109 mph (175 km/h) at 10:53 AM EDT (14:53 UTC). This measurement was used to rate this tornado high-end EF1 as no meaningful damage was found.

==== New York ====
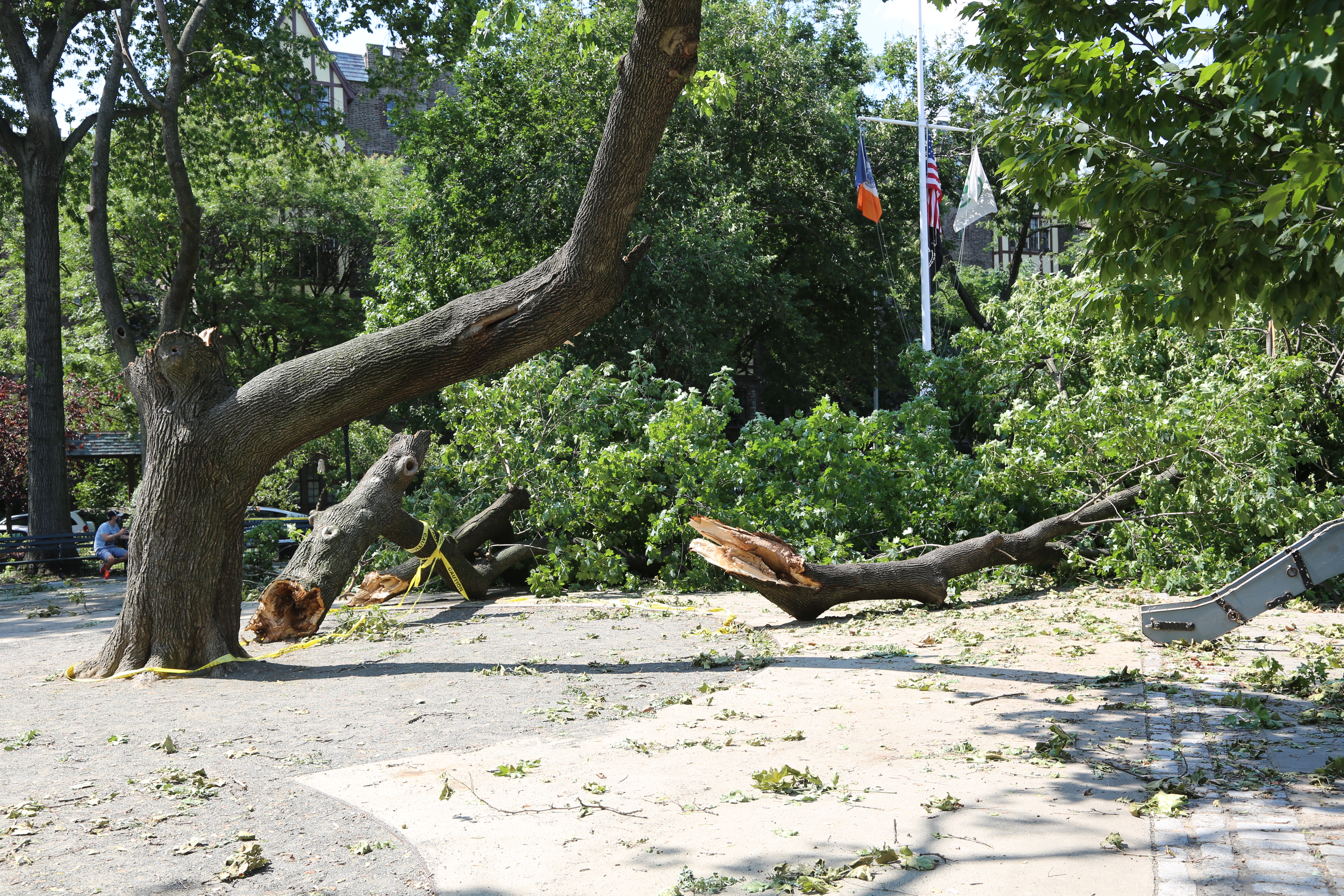
Maple branches snapped by high winds in Manhattan.

In New York, a person was killed in New York City when a tree fell on their car in Queens. In New York, wind gusts reached 78 mph (126 km/h) at Republic Airport on Long Island, 70 mph (110 km/h) at John F. Kennedy International Airport, and 59 mph (95 km/h) at White Plains Airport. The New York City Subway service at outdoor stations was suspended in the afternoon, due to sustained winds over 39 mph (63 km/h). Service along the Metro-North Railroad and Long Island Rail Road was also suspended. There were over 3,100 trees knocked down by the storm in Queens, causing power outages and damage to homes. A woman was taken to the hospital in critical condition after being struck in the head by a falling tree branch in Brooklyn. A building in Brooklyn partially collapsed as a result of storm damage, resulting in evacuations. In Manhattan, a person was injured due to high winds pushing over a flood barrier. Tree damage was especially heavy in Rockland County. Five overturned trucks on the Verrazzano–Narrows Bridge forced the bridge to shut down. Despite the wind, little rain fell across the metro area, with 0.48 in (12 mm) of rain in Central Park, and 0.14 in (3.6 mm) of rain in Islip. Numerous roads experienced closures on part of the route, including Interstate 684, the Bronx River Parkway, and the Saw Mill River Parkway. Further north, a daily rainfall record was set in Albany, with 3.92 in (100 mm) of rain falling, with the highest rainfall total being 7.01 in (178 mm) in Phoenicia. Over 579,000 customers lost power due to Isaias in New York. Both Jones Beach State Park and Robert Moses State Park closed due to the tropical storm due to a loss of power.

==== New England ====
Multiple tornado warnings were issued throughout New England with a waterspout briefly moving ashore as an EF1 tornado in Westport, Connecticut, ripping a roof off a house and snapping large pine trees. It was the first tornado on record in Connecticut to be associated with a tropical storm or hurricane. The storm left roughly 750,000 Connecticut residents without power, including 625,000 customers of Eversource Energy and 123,000 customers of the United Illuminating Company. Trees falling on wires were responsible for most of the power outages, and also resulted in portions of Merritt Parkway shutting down. Property damage in Connecticut reached $54.347 million. Massachusetts saw an additional 148,000 power outages and Rhode Island saw 130,000 power outages. Wind gusts in Connecticut reached 68 miles per hour (109 km/h) in Bridgeport, and the peak gust in Massachusetts was 63 miles per hour (101 km/h) in Marshfield. The strongest winds from Isaias throughout its path were observed on Mount Washington, which recorded a gust of 147 miles per hour (237 km/h), the strongest wind gust ever recorded on the mountain in August. Two people died after being hit by falling trees in Naugatuck, Connecticut, and North Conway, New Hampshire. Another man was indirectly killed in a chainsaw accident while helping a friend cut some downed trees from the storm in Newtown, Connecticut.

==== Confirmed tornadoes ====
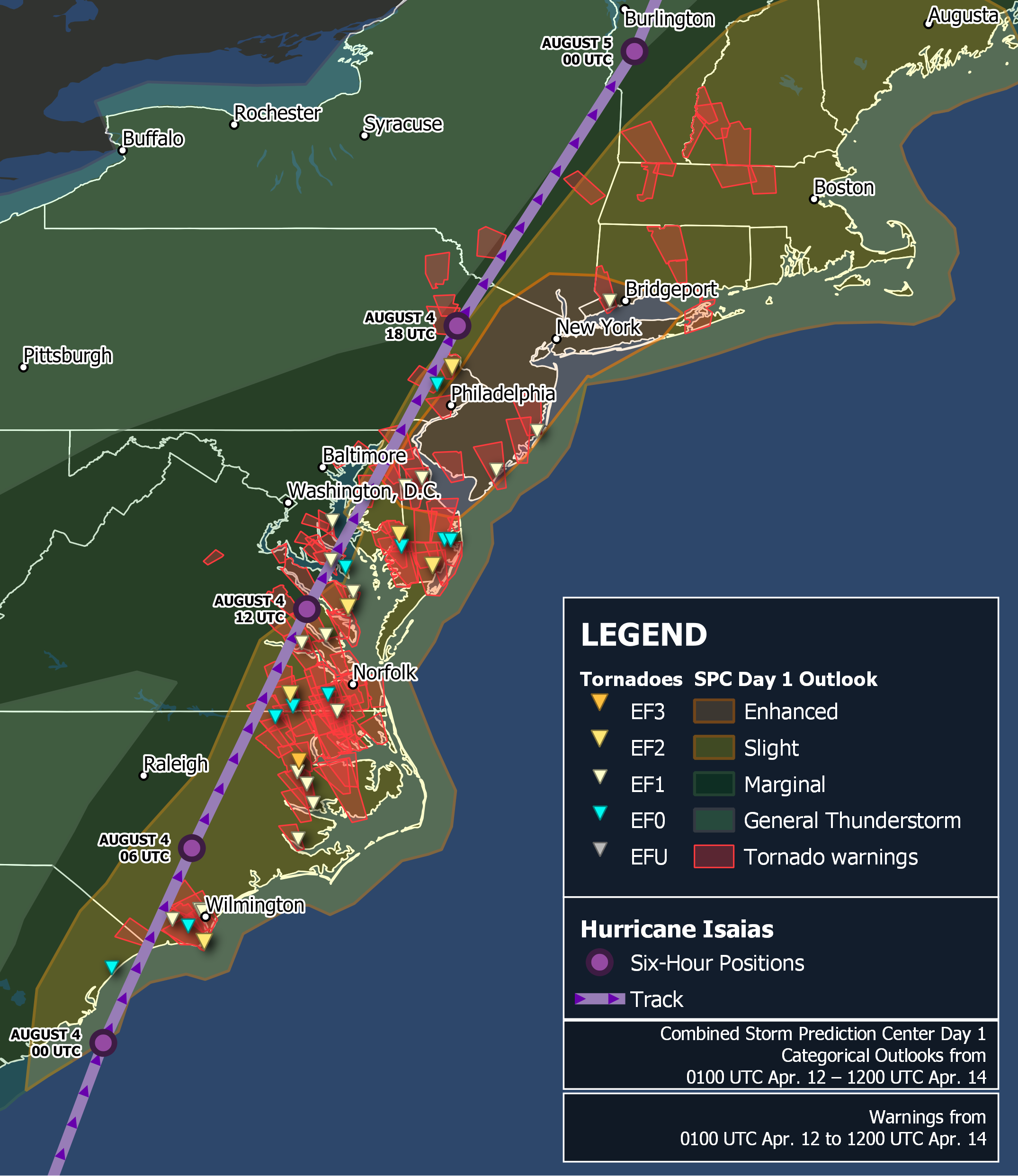
Hurricane Isaias tornado outbreak warnings and reports

Confirmed tornadoes by Enhanced Fujita rating
EFU	EF0	EF1	EF2	EF3	EF4	EF5	Total
0	11	20	7	1	0	0	39

===== August 3 event =====
List of confirmed tornadoes – Monday, August 3, 2020 (Note: All dates are based on the local time zone where the tornado touched down; however, all times are in Coordinated Universal Time for consistency.)
EF#	Location	County / Parish	State	Start Coord.	Time (UTC)	Path length	Max width
EF2	Bald Head Island to Southport	Brunswick	NC	33.8465°N 77.9592°W	23:55–00:05	8.3 mi (13.4 km)	80 yd (73 m)
EF2	A strong waterspout moved onshore in Bald Head Island. There, homes lost roofing and had windows blown in, and a swath of large trees was flattened. It crossed the Cape Fear River, before coming onshore again in Southport. Homes and businesses were damaged, and trees were snapped or uprooted in that area before the tornado dissipated.						
EF0	SW of Bolivia	Brunswick	NC	34.0403°N 78.1409°W	00:15-00:19	2.91 mi (4.68 km)	20 yd (18 m)
EF0	Trees and tree limbs were downed along the path.						
EF1	NW of Supply	Brunswick	NC	34.1162°N 78.3191°W	00:15–00:16	0.28 mi (0.45 km)	25 yd (23 m)
EF1	Trees were damaged, including 20 pine trees which were snapped. The path may have been longer, but the area was inaccessible due to a lack of road access in the Green Swamp.						
EF0	Garden City Beach	Georgetown	SC	33.568°N 79.0046°W	00:20–00:21	0.2 mi (0.32 km)	30 yd (27 m)
EF0	A waterspout came onshore, causing minor damage to a few homes before quickly lifting. One injury occurred at a beach home.						
EF1	S of Leland to W of Navessa	Brunswick	NC	34.2268°N 78.0124°W	00:43–00:46	2.59 mi (4.17 km)	30 yd (27 m)
EF1	Trees were snapped, including several pine trees.						
EF1	Leland	Brunswick	NC	34.2064°N 77.9810°W	01:59–02:01	1.5 mi (2.4 km)	40 yd (37 m)
EF1	This tornado moved through a subdivision in Leland, where roofs and chimneys were damaged, and a garage door partially collapsed. Many trees were snapped or uprooted along the path, including several pine trees which were 2 ft (0.61 m) in diameter.						
EF1	Kennel Beach to SE of Fairfield Harbor	Pamlico	NC	35.0238°N 76.8986°W	03:23–03:25	2.35 mi (3.78 km)	40 yd (37 m)
EF1	This tornado originated as a waterspout over the Neuse River. Once it came onshore in Kennel Beach, it snapped trees, including one pine tree which fell on a home. It continued to damage trees before lifting in a rural area.						

===== August 4 event =====
List of confirmed tornadoes – Tuesday, August 4, 2020
EF#	Location	County / Parish	State	Start Coord.	Time (UTC)	Path length	Max width
EF1	Goose Creek State Park	Beaufort	NC	35.4610°N 76.8952°W	04:18–04:19	0.15 mi (0.24 km)	70 yd (64 m)
EF1	This tornado touched down on the southeast side of the state park. A swath of large pine trees were snapped.						
EF1	NE of Pinetown	Beaufort	NC	35.6441°N 76.8008°W	04:48–04:49	0.1 mi (0.16 km)	50 yd (46 m)
EF1	Several large hardwood trees were uprooted and large limbs were snapped by this brief tornado. Corn was damaged in a farm field as well.						
EF1	Bayview	Beaufort	NC	35.4262°N 76.7291°W	04:50–04:51	0.8 mi (1.3 km)	180 yd (160 m)
EF1	Numerous trees, the majority of which were pine, were either snapped, uprooted, or twisted. Several of the trees fell on vehicles and homes in town, causing roof and wall damage. A manufactured home sustained minor damage, and the roof of a small shed was blown off.						
EF1	SSW of Jamesville	Martin	NC	35.7803°N 76.9094°W	05:02–05:03	0.2 mi (0.32 km)	40 yd (37 m)
EF1	A large oak tree fell on a mobile home. Additional trees and crops were damaged nearby.						
EF3	SSW of Woodard to NW of Windsor	Bertie	NC	35.8873°N 76.8904°W	05:15–05:26	10 mi (16 km)	600 yd (550 m)
EF3	2 deaths – This intense and destructive tornado first touched down southwest of Woodard just north of the Roanoke River, and immediately rapidly intensified as it moved northwest. It reached its peak intensity of EF3 strength shortly thereafter, completely destroying three mobile homes, a barn, and a single-story frame home. The frame home was completely leveled but was not anchored to its foundation. The tornado maintained its strength while reaching its peak width as it struck a mobile home park, where a dozen mobile homes were destroyed, and several others were severely damaged. Some of the mobile homes were obliterated, with their metal frames twisted and the debris scattered long distances through a nearby field. Several vehicles were tossed in this area as well. The two fatalities occurred at the mobile home park. The tornado then continued northwestward and weakened slightly to EF2 intensity, flattening a large swath of trees and causing significant damage to some homes in multiple neighborhoods. The tornado weakened further to EF1 strength as it damaged multiple businesses and homes along the concurrent US 17/Bypass US 17 and US 13 just west of Windsor. Several farm buildings were damaged northwest of Windsor before the tornado dissipated along NC 308. A total of 14 people were injured. This was strongest tornado spawned by a tropical cyclone since 2005. After the storm, North Carolina Governor Roy Cooper, toured the mobile home park hit by the tornado in Windsor, saying it was "devastating" to see what happened to the area.						
EF0	E of Menola to SW of Murfreesboro	Hertford, Northampton	NC	36.4052°N 77.1567°W	06:13–06:19	5 mi (8.0 km)	100 yd (91 m)
EF0	Mainly tree damage occurred, although the large TDS produced by the tornado prompted a PDS tornado warning.						
EF0	NE of Como, NC to E of Statesville, VA	Hertford (NC), Southampton (VA)	NC, VA	36.5238°N 76.9581°W	06:37–06:41	3.13 mi (5.04 km)	50 yd (46 m)
EF0	A weak tornado snapped limbs and downed a few trees to the northeast of Mill Neck, North Carolina.						
EF2	WSW of Franklin to N of Courtland	Southampton	VA	36.6450°N 76.9900°W	06:49–07:19	15.9 mi (25.6 km)	200 yd (180 m)
EF2	Numerous homes and businesses were damaged along US 58 near Courtland, including a hotel, which sustained total roof loss and collapse of multiple second-story exterior walls. Multiple industrial buildings and a gas station were severely damaged as well. Many trees were snapped or uprooted, and several vehicles were overturned. Overall, this tornado caused $12 million in damages.						
EF1	NW of Lynchs Corner, NC to NNW of Suffolk, VA	Pasquotank (NC), Camden (NC), City of Suffolk (VA)	NC, VA	36.4675°N 76.4573°W	07:02–07:30	26.86 mi (43.23 km)	150 yd (140 m)
EF1	This tornado moved through rural areas of the Great Dismal Swamp before striking Downtown Suffolk. Eight buildings were significantly damaged in the downtown area, including a multi-story brick building that sustained collapse of an exterior wall. Homes were also damaged in residential areas, a few of which had sections of roofing torn off. Many trees were uprooted or snapped along the path as well, some of which landed on structures.						
EF0	W of Great Dismal Swamp to ESE of Windsor	City of Suffolk	VA	36.657°N 76.562°W	07:08–07:22	11.7 mi (18.8 km)	100 yd (91 m)
EF0	This tornado hit the western side of Suffolk right before the EF1 tornado hit downtown. Damage was limited to trees being uprooted or snapped.						
EF1	NW of Jamestown	James City	VA	37.24°N 76.86°W	08:13–08:14	0.8 mi (1.3 km)	200 yd (180 m)
EF1	This brief tornado originated as a waterspout. After coming onshore, shingles were ripped off roofs, a garage door was caved in, and a brick gable collapsed. The tornado passed over a golf course before lifting. Trees and tree limbs were snapped.						
EF1	SSE of Rosewell to ENE of Capahosic	Gloucester	VA	37.3264°N 76.5862°W	08:53–09:00	4.7 mi (7.6 km)	250 yd (230 m)
EF1	This tornado originated as a waterspout over the York River before moving ashore. Numerous trees were snapped or uprooted, and several homes sustained roof and siding damage. The tornado briefly crossed the York River again before lifting.						
EF2	ENE of Palmer to N of Browns Corner	Lancaster, Northumberland	VA	37.6274°N 76.3358°W	09:40–10:00	15.6 mi (25.1 km)	500 yd (460 m)
EF2	A strong tornado produced high-end EF2 damage in the rural community of Antipoison Neck, where multiple homes sustained significant roof and exterior wall damage. The tornado weakened as it struck the eastern part of Kilmarnock, causing damage to roofs, siding, and trees. The tornado continued to cause roof and tree damage as it moved to the north before dissipating. Five people were injured. The tornado caused $3 million in damages.						
EF2	W of Mardela Springs	Wicomico	MD	38.4474°N 75.7575°W	09:55–10:00	1.3 mi (2.1 km)	100 yd (91 m)
EF2	Several homes were damaged just outside of town, including one that was pushed off its foundation and heavily damaged. Sheds and outbuildings were destroyed, and trees were snapped or uprooted, including a few that sustained some low-end debarking. An automotive repair business sustained minor damage to its overhead doors at the end of the path.						
EF1	Fleeton to W of Reedville	Northumberland	VA	37.8137°N 76.2771°W	10:06–10:09	2.2 mi (3.5 km)	100 yd (91 m)
EF1	This tornado originated as a waterspout over the Chesapeake Bay, before moving onshore in Fleeton. Several homes had roof and siding damage, a garage was destroyed, and trees were snapped or uprooted. The tornado destroyed a canopy before lifting.						
EF0	Scotland to Ridge	St. Mary's	MD	38.093°N 76.365°W	10:27–10:31	1.5 mi (2.4 km)	75 yd (69 m)
EF0	Many trees were snapped or downed along the path.						
EF1	W of Piney Point to Callaway	St. Mary's	MD	38.174°N 76.528°W	10:32–10:41	5.3 mi (8.5 km)	100 yd (91 m)
EF1	Numerous trees were snapped or uprooted, some of which fell on and damaged homes and a shed. A camper was also blown over.						
EF1	Solomons	Calvert	MD	38.3336°N 76.4782°W	10:52–10:53	0.9 mi (1.4 km)	175 yd (160 m)
EF1	Trees were snapped or uprooted, including some which fell on recreational vehicles, as well as onto several recreational facilities at a U.S. Navy compound.						
EF2	George Island Landing to Girdletree	Worcester	MD	38.0969°N 75.3813°W	11:14–11:17	3.79 mi (6.10 km)	200 yd (180 m)
EF2	A low-end EF2 tornado destroyed some chicken houses shortly after touching down. A camper and a number of outbuildings were overturned and tossed, and several homes on the edge of the path had partial roof loss and blown out windows. The tornado weakened after that, causing minor tree damage on the east side of Girdletree before dissipating.						
EF0	Quantico	Wicomico	MD	38.3290°N 75.7318°W	11:22–11:26	2.74 mi (4.41 km)	100 yd (91 m)
EF0	This tornado developed over the Wicomico River. It tracked through a residential neighborhood, causing minor damage to several homes. Siding, shingles, and gutters were damaged, and trees were uprooted.						
EF1	N of Dares Beach	Calvert	MD	38.6150°N 76.5120°W	11:33–11:37	1.7 mi (2.7 km)	100 yd (91 m)
EF1	A waterspout moved onshore at Plum Point, downing many trees and several power lines. Three houses sustained damage from fallen trees, and a fourth house had windows blown out.						
EF0	NE of Ironshire to WNW of Showell	Worcester	MD	38.4067°N 75.2465°W	11:35–11:44	7.99 mi (12.86 km)	75 yd (69 m)
EF0	This tornado crossed US 113 before snapping and uprooting trees in and around Berlin.						
EF0	S of Snug Harbor to Ocean Pines	Worcester	MD	38.4013°N 75.1758°W	11:55–12:05	9.91 mi (15.95 km)	75 yd (69 m)
EF0	An intermittent tornado occurred just east of the previous one, downing several trees, one of which landed on a home.						
EF0	Queenstown	Queen Anne's	MD	38.93°N 76.13°W	12:18-12:19	0.6 mi (0.97 km)	35 yd (32 m)
EF0	A narrow path of crop damage occurred in a corn field. Some minor tree damage occurred as well.						
EF1	Sandtown	Kent	DE	39.01°N 75.69°W	12:25-12:28	2.6 mi (4.2 km)	200 yd (180 m)
EF1	One home had some windows blown out, another had its roof blown off, while several other homes in Sandtown sustained less severe roof damage. One large garage lost its back sheet metal wall as well.						
EF1	Freeman Corner to WNW of Milford	Sussex, Kent	DE	38.89°N 75.45°W	12:25-12:30	2.7 mi (4.3 km)	400 yd (370 m)
EF1	Many trees were snapped or uprooted, some of which fell on homes. Power poles and lines were downed.						
EF2	Dover to Middletown to SW of Glasgow	Kent, New Castle	DE	39.10°N 75.50°W	12:55–13:30	35.78 mi (57.58 km)	500 yd (460 m)
EF2	As this tornado touched down on the southern side of Dover, it did significant damage to trees, some of which fell on homes. The tornado crossed US 13, where it blew off sections of roofing at a middle school. A nearby warehouse had metal walls torn off, and some tractor-trailers were blown onto their sides. A garage was also severely damaged. Damage along this first segment of the path was rated EF1. Past Dover, the tornado produced intermittent tree damage before impacting the east side of Smyrna, where more significant tree damage occurred. A weather station run by DelDOT measured a 96 mph (154 km/h) wind gust on DE 1 north of Smyrna as the tornado passed by. The tornado destroyed a car repair facility on the south end of Smyrna and damaged numerous houses. The tornado then nearly paralleled US 13 and DE 1 through the eastern side of Townsend at high-end EF1 strength, causing considerable damage to homes and businesses. Numerous trees were snapped or uprooted, and a garage was also destroyed. The tornado then reached low-end EF2 intensity as it struck Middletown, where many homes sustained significant roof, exterior wall, and garage door damage. A few of these homes sustained at least partial exterior wall loss, including one poorly constructed home that had an entire second-floor exterior wall ripped off. Low-end EF2 damage continued near Summit Bridge as multiple additional homes sustained considerable damage to the north of Middletown, one of which had half of its roof torn off. Many trees were snapped, and several other homes lost portions of their roofs in this area. Farther along the path, the tornado maintained low-end EF2 intensity as it tracked near Lums Pond and through portions of Bear, where more homes were damaged and trees were downed. The most significant damage along this segment of the path occurred as the tornado crossed DE 896 and into the Brennan Estates subdivision, where 12 homes were damaged to the point where they were declared uninhabitable. The tornado then rapidly weakened and finally lifted to the southwest of Glasgow, just prior to crossing into Cecil County, Maryland. This was the longest tracked tornado in the state since modern records began in 1950.						
EF1	Strathmere to Marmora	Cape May	NJ	39.19°N 74.66°W	13:45–13:50	5.25 mi (8.45 km)	150 yd (140 m)
EF1	This tornado originated as a waterspout before coming onshore on the south end of Corson's Inlet State Park near Strathmere. The tornado then crossed Garden State Parkway and tracked along US 9 through the southern side of Marmora. Homes and businesses were significantly damaged, including some which lost their roofs, and some which had significant damage done to their side or corner walls. One home was shifted off its foundation. Near a Coca-Cola facility, the tornado tossed containers and flipped a tractor-trailer. A large shed was upended, and vehicles were pushed. Trees were snapped or uprooted, including some which fell on cars, crushing them.						
EF0	Worcester Township	Montgomery	PA	40.16°N 75.33°W	14:44–14:50	2.8 mi (4.5 km)	200 yd (180 m)
EF0	Some small trees were downed, tree tops were snapped off, and several utility poles were pushed over.						
EF1	Ship Bottom to NNW of Mud City	Ocean	NJ	39.63°N 74.20°W	14:50–14:54	3 mi (4.8 km)	—N/a
EF1	A waterspout first developed over Manahawkin Bay between Ship Bottom and Brant Beach. It crossed the Route 72 bridge over the bay before coming onshore near Mud City in mainly marshy areas. Other than some light debris seen flying over the bay bridge, no damage was found. However, a weather station located north of Egg Island measured a wind gust of 109 mph (175 km/h) at 10:53 AM EDT (14:53 UTC). This measurement was used to rate this tornado high-end EF1, as no meaningful damage was found.						
EF2	Northeast Philadelphia to Southampton to Doylestown	Bucks, Philadelphia	PA	40.0815°N 74.9592°W	14:50–15:10	20.77 mi (33.43 km)	500 yd (460 m)
EF2	This intermittent, but strong tornado first touched down just east of the Philadelphia Mills shopping mall in Northeast Philadelphia, and moved northwest at EF1 strength. At a former Walmart building undergoing reconstruction, three exhaust systems and six RTU systems were blown off the roof. Roofing, siding, and awnings were blown off many homes in the area, and some cars were either tossed or flipped. Trees were snapped or uprooted, including some which were over 100 years old. The tornado then lifted before briefly touching down in Southampton at a slightly weaker low-end EF1 intensity. Numerous trees and tree limbs were snapped, including some that damaged homes and cars. After lifting again, the tornado touched down a third time at its peak intensity of low-end EF2 in Doylestown. Bleachers on the visitors' side of an athletic field at Central Bucks High School West were tossed before the tornado hit the Doylestown Hospital complex, tossing numerous vehicles in a parking lot. Some of these vehicles were piled atop one another, and six were thrown considerable distances. The tornado then struck the Children's Village Day Care center, causing significant damage as large portions of roof structure were torn from the building. Debris from this location was strewn through a nearby field. Numerous large trees were snapped or uprooted in Doylestown, and several metal light posts were bent to the ground. The tornado weakened back to EF1 intensity as it continued northwest, damaging homes and other properties, and snapping or uprooting trees. The tornado then lifted for the final time near Lake Galena in Peace Valley Park. There were six minor injuries.						
EF1	Saugatuck Shores	Fairfield	CT	41.10°N 73.38°W	17:40–17:41	50 yd (46 m)	
EF1	A waterspout over the Long Island Sound moved onshore before quickly dissipating. A house had its roof blown off, and several pine trees were snapped. This was the first tornado on record in Connecticut to be associated with a tropical storm or hurricane.						

=== Canada ===
Damage was rather minimal in Eastern Canada. By 8 A.M. EDT on August 5, 26,138 Hydro-Quebec customers had lost power. Across the province of Quebec, over 38,189 homes lost power because of the tropical storm. At the height of the storm, nearly 75,000 people were without electricity, more than half of them in the Capitale-Nationale, where winds were around 70 km/h (43 mph). At Île d'Orléans, gusts of 91 km/h were recorded (56.5 mph). Further west, Trois-Rivières received 100 mm (3.9 in) of rain, and 120 mm (4.7 in) fell in Charlevoix.

== Aftermath ==
In North Carolina, Governor Roy Cooper, toured the area hit by the EF3 tornado in Windsor, North Carolina, saying it was "devastating" to see what happened to the area. A state of emergency was also declared in 13 counties in New York due to damage caused by the storm. Thousands of customers throughout the Tri-State (NY-NJ-CT) area remained without power for over a week after the storm, with Governor Cuomo and the New York State Legislature launching an investigation into different utility companies' respective responses. A state of emergency was declared in Connecticut due to 700,000 residents losing power. On August 6, Connecticut governor Ned Lamont activated the Connecticut National Guard to assist with power restoration efforts in the state. Eversource was later fined $28.6 million, with United Illuminating being fined $1.2 million, due to their slow response to the storm.

== See also ==
- Timeline of the 2020 Atlantic hurricane season
- Tropical cyclones in 2020
- List of Category 1 Atlantic hurricanes
- List of costliest Atlantic hurricanes
- List of storms named Isaias
- List of Florida hurricanes (2000–present)
- List of North Carolina hurricanes (2000–present)
- List of Maryland hurricanes (1950–present)
- List of Delaware hurricanes
- List of New Jersey hurricanes
- List of Pennsylvania hurricanes
- List of New York hurricanes
- List of New England hurricanes
