= North Penn Water Authority =

American water company

- Company type: Municipal authority
- Industry: Utilities
- Founded: August 10, 1965
- Headquarters: Lansdale, Pennsylvania, U.S.
- Key people: Keith Hass, P.E. (Executive Director)
- Products: Water
- Number of employees: 50+
- Website: npwa.org

The North Penn Water Authority (NPWA) is a water utility providing drinking water to portions of Bucks and Montgomery counties in the U.S. state of Pennsylvania, centered around the North Penn Valley region. The NPWA is a municipal authority that is owned by the municipalities that is serves. The NPWA provides drinking water to over 36,000 customers in 20 municipalities. The authority was formed in 1965 and has grown over the years.

== Service area ==
The NPWA provides drinking water to portions of Bucks and Montgomery counties centered around the North Penn Valley region, serving over 36,000 customers. In Montgomery County, the NPWA serves the boroughs of Hatfield, Lansdale, and Souderton; all of Franconia Township, Lower Salford Township, Skippack Township, and Towamencin Township; almost all of Hatfield Township; most of Worcester Township; and small portions of Montgomery Township, Salford Township, Upper Gwynedd Township, and Upper Salford Township. In Bucks County, the NPWA serves the borough of Sellersville; parts of Hilltown Township and New Britain Township; and small portions of the borough of New Britain, East Rockhill Township, and West Rockhill Township.

== Governance ==
The NPWA is a municipal authority that is owned by the municipalities that it serves. The authority is governed by a ten-member Board of Directors who are appointed to five year terms by member municipalities. The Board of Directors hold meetings once a month that the public can attend. The NPWA has a management team that is in charge of the daily operations. As of 2026, Keith Hass, P.E., is the Executive Director of NPWA.

== Water supply ==
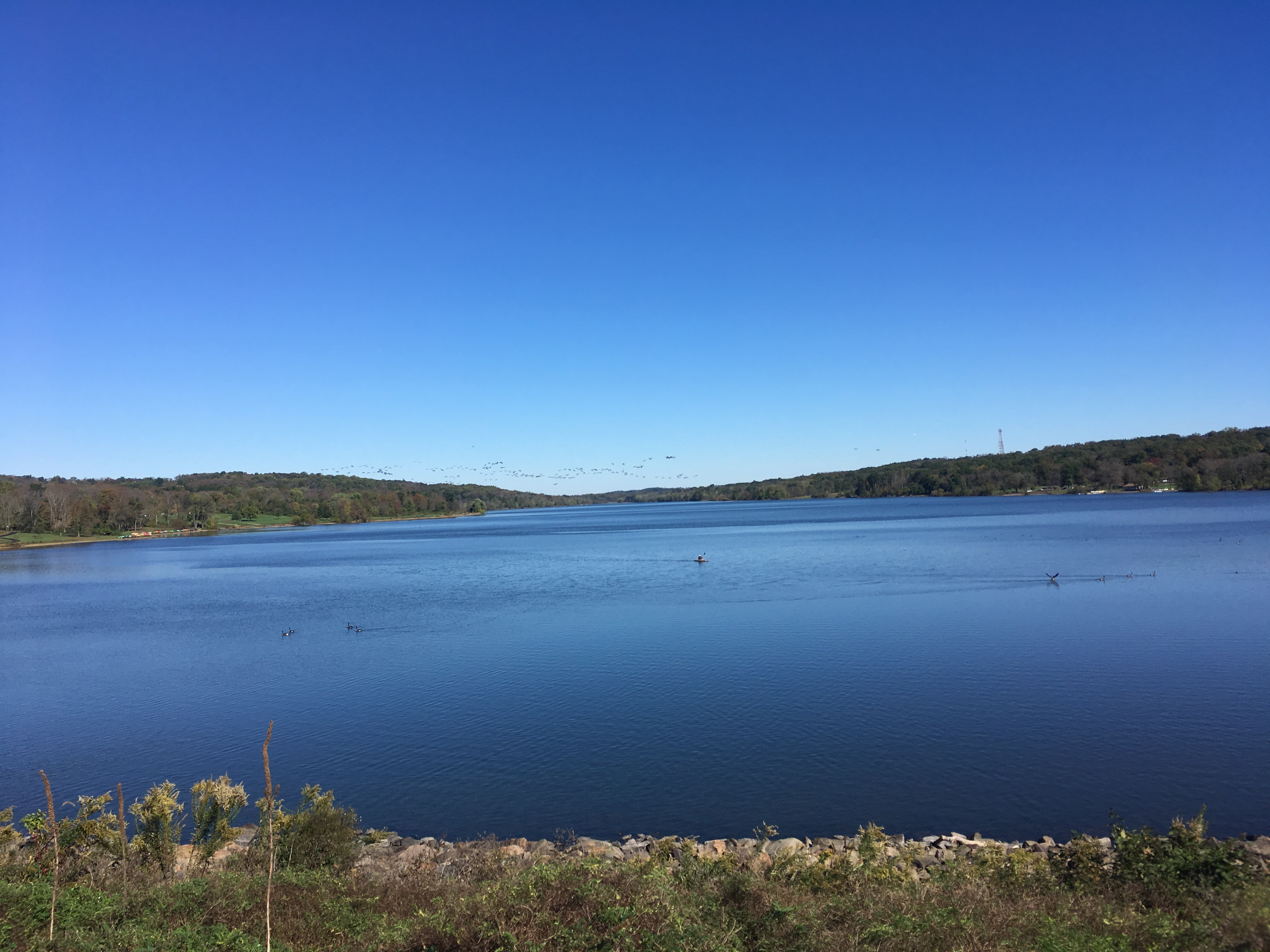
Lake Galena, which stores water that is treated at the Forest Park Water Treatment Plant

One hundred percent of the water delivered to customers by the NPWA is treated at the Forest Park Water Treatment Plant in Chalfont, a facility that is owned jointly with the North Wales Water Authority (NWWA). The water treated at this plant comes from the North Branch Neshaminy Creek, which flows into Lake Galena, a reservoir for the water treated at the Forest Park Water Treatment Plant. Water released from Lake Galena flows down the creek to the Forest Park Water Treatment Plant. During the summer months and times when water levels are low, additional water is pumped from the Delaware River at Point Pleasant and diverted to the North Branch Neshaminy Creek near Gardenville. The Forest Park Water Treatment Plant is the largest water treatment plant in Bucks County and processes up to 43 million gallons water a day for delivery to NPWA and NWWA customers. From the Forest Park Water Treatment Plant, a main carries water to the NPWA service area, where it is delivered to customers.

== History ==
The origins of the authority date back to 1958 when a group of citizens from several municipalities in the North Penn Valley region formed the North Penn Water Resources Association to improve the drinking water supply in the area. The NPWA was incorporated on August 10, 1964, with Lansdale, Souderton, Franconia Township, Hatfield Township, Lower Salford Township, Towamencin Township, and Worcester Township the original municipalities that formed the authority. In August 1965, the NPWA purchased and began operating the water systems in Lansdale and Souderton. A transmission line was soon built to connect the water systems in the two boroughs. The authority gained more customers as the North Penn Valley region grew in population. In 1975, the NPWA acquired four small water systems and eight wells in Skippack Township and a small water system in Hilltown Township. Additional municipalities became members of NPWA in the 1980s, with Skippack Township joining in April 1986 and New Britain Township and the borough of Hatfield joining in 1987. The NPWA took over the water system in New Britain Township in August 1987 and the borough of Hatfield in February 1988.

In the 1970s and 1980s, water shortages became a problem for the NPWA as the population of the service area grew. An expansion to 55 groundwater wells and the purchase of surface water from outside sources helped alleviate the problem. Despite this, an additional surface water source was needed to supply the authority in the future. In 1987, the NPWA and the NWWA began construction of an Interim Treatment Plant at the present location of the Forest Park Water Treatment Plant in Chalfont. The interim plant opened in February 1989 and supplied 3.2 million gallons of water a day. Construction of a permanent Forest Park Water Treatment Plant to supply 20 million gallons of water a day began in June 1991. The Forest Park Water Treatment Plant began operation on June 21, 1994. An expansion to the Forest Park Water Treatment Plant in 2007 increased the output to 40 million gallons of water a day to keep up with the growing water use of the area. In 2011, the NPWA took over the water system in Sellersville.
