= North Wales Water Authority =

Water utility in Pennsylvania, USA

- Company type: Municipal authority
- Industry: Utilities
- Founded: 1951
- Headquarters: North Wales, Pennsylvania, U.S.
- Key people: Robert C. Bender (Executive Director)
- Products: Water
- Website: www.nwwater.com

The North Wales Water Authority (NWWA) is a water utility and municipal authority providing drinking water to portions of Bucks and Montgomery counties in the U.S. state of Pennsylvania, centered around the borough of North Wales. The NWWA was established by the borough of North Wales in 1951 and has expanded its service area since then.

== Service area ==
The NWWA serves over 50,000 customers across fourteen municipalities in Bucks and Montgomery counties. In Montgomery County, the NWWA serves the borough of North Wales, Horsham Township, most of Montgomery Township, most of Upper Gwynedd Township, most of Lower Gwynedd Township, part of Whitpain Township, and part of Upper Dublin Township. In Bucks County, the NWWA serves part of New Britain Township, Doylestown Township, part of Solebury Township, part of Buckingham Township, Warminster Township, Warrington Township, and Plumstead Township .

In addition to providing water to customers in its service area, the NWWA provides wholesale water to other water authorities in Bucks and Montgomery counties. Water authorities that receive wholesale water from NWWA include the Doylestown Township Municipal Authority, the Horsham Water and Sewer Authority, the Warminster Municipal Authority, the Warwick Township Water and Sewer Authority, and Plumstead township.

== Governance ==
The NWWA is a municipal authority that consists of a five-member board of directors appointed to staggered five-year terms by the North Wales Borough Council. The authority is governed by an executive team that consists of an Executive Director, a Solicitor, and Engineer of Record. As of 2018, Robert C. Bender is the Executive Director of NWWA.

== Water supply ==
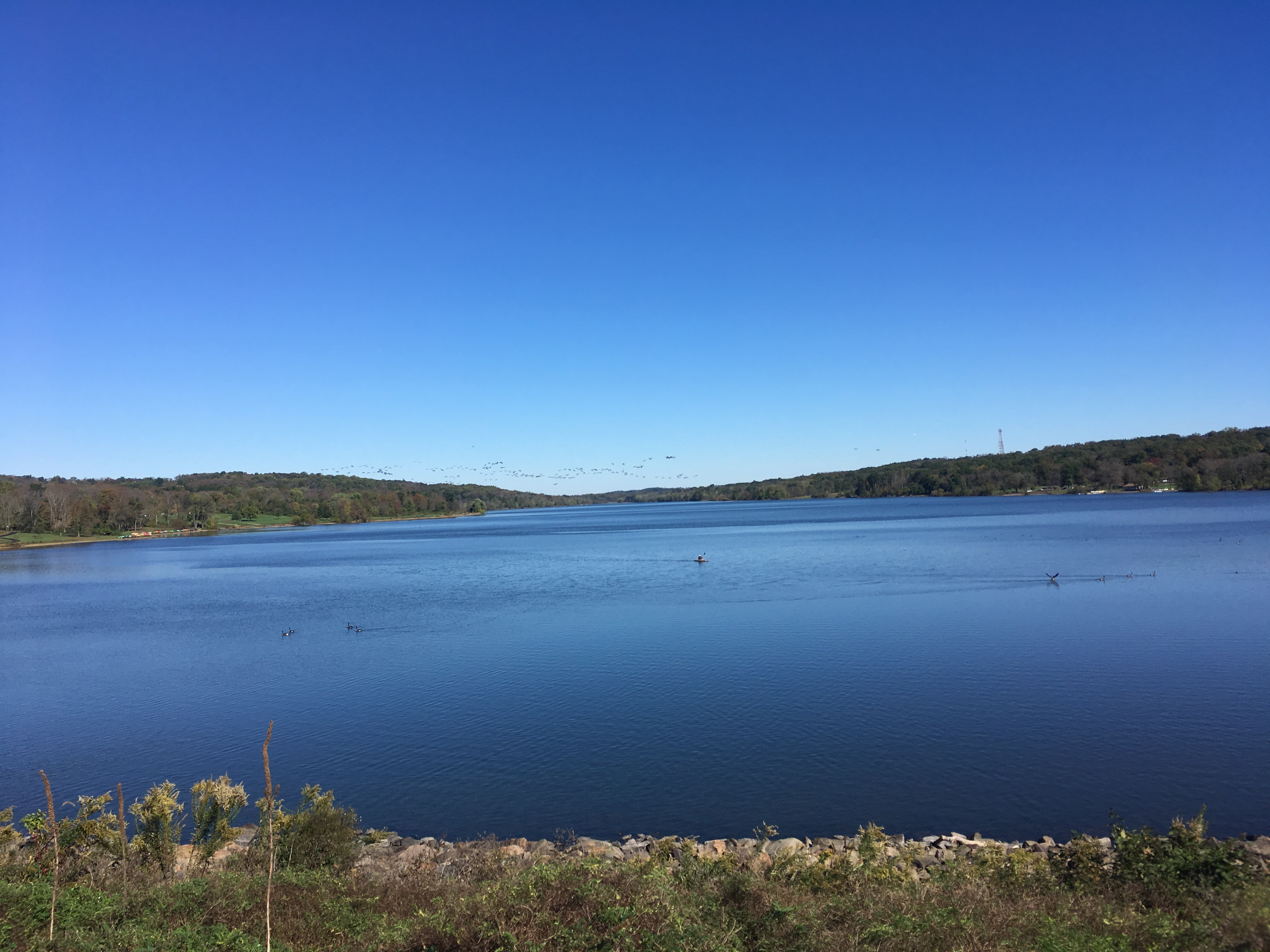
Lake Galena, which stores water that is treated at the Forest Park Water Treatment Plant

Much of the water delivered to customers by the NWWA is treated at the Forest Park Water Treatment Plant in Chalfont, a facility that is owned jointly with the North Penn Water Authority (NPWA). The water treated at this plant comes from the North Branch Neshaminy Creek, which flows into Lake Galena, a reservoir for the water treated at the Forest Park Water Treatment Plant. Water released from Lake Galena flows down the creek to the Forest Park Water Treatment Plant. During the summer months and times when water levels are low, additional water is pumped from the Delaware River at Point Pleasant and diverted to the North Branch Neshaminy Creek near Gardenville. The Forest Park Water Treatment Plant is the largest water treatment plant in Bucks County and processes up to 40 million gallons water a day for delivery to NPWA and NWWA customers. From the Forest Park Water Treatment Plant, a main carries water to the NWWA service area, where it is delivered to customers.

== History ==
The NWWA was established as a municipal authority by the borough of North Wales in 1951 to take over the privately owned North Wales Water Company, which served 1,200 customers at the time. The NWWA expanded its service area into Upper Gwynedd Township and Lower Gwynedd Township in order to provide water service to those areas. After a drought hit the area in 1964, the authority expanded its service territory into Montgomery Township. In the late 1960s, the NWWA acquired the Blue Bell Water Company, which added Whitpain Township to its service area. The authority acquired the Upper Dublin and Delaware Valley Industrial Water Companies in 1979, which expanded its service area into Upper Dublin Township, including the office parks in Fort Washington. The NWWA expanded its service area into New Britain Township in Bucks County in the 1980s. In 1987, the NPWA and the NWWA began construction of an Interim Treatment Plant at the present location of the Forest Park Water Treatment Plant in Chalfont. The interim plant opened in February 1989 and supplied 3.2 million gallons of water a day. Construction of a permanent Forest Park Water Treatment Plant to supply 20 million gallons of water a day began in June 1991. The Forest Park Water Treatment Plant began operation on June 21, 1994. An expansion to the Forest Park Water Treatment Plant in 2007 increased the output to 40 million gallons of water a day to keep up with the growing water use of the area.
