= North Branch Neshaminy Creek =

- North Branch Neshaminy Creek

Location
- Country: United States
- State: Pennsylvania
- County: Bucks
- Township: New Britain; Plumstead
- Borough: Chalfont

Physical characteristics
- Source
  - coordinates: 40°23′20″N 75°6′13″W
  - elevation: 400 feet (120 m)
- Mouth
  - coordinates: 40°16′56″N 75°12′16″W
  - elevation: 239 feet (73 m)
- Length: 10.8 miles (17.4 km)
- Basin size: 31.6 square miles (82 km^{2})

Basin features
- Progression: North Branch Neshaminy Creek → Neshaminy Creek → Delaware River → Delaware Bay
- River system: Delaware River
- Waterbodies: Peace Valley Reservoir
- Slope: 14.91 feet per mile (2.824 m/km)

North Branch Neshaminy Creek is one of two main branches of the Neshaminy Creek, the other being the West Branch. Rising in Plumstead Township, Bucks County, Pennsylvania, passing through the Peace Valley Park as Lake Galena, then meeting with the West Branch forming the main branch of the Neshaminy.

== Statistics ==
The West Branch has a watershed of 31.60 square miles (81.8 km^{2}) and is part of the Delaware River watershed. The Geographic Name Information System I.D. is 1182546, U.S. Department of the Interior Geological Survey I.D. is 02789.

== Course ==
The North Branch of the Neshaminy Creek rises in Plumstead Township east of Pennsylvania Route 413 north of the village of Gardenville, it flows southwest passing through Lake Galena in Peace Valley Park. Then it turns south to meet with the main branch of the Neshaminy.

== Named Tributaries ==
- Pine Run

== Municipalities ==
- Bucks County
  - Chalfont Borough
  - New Britain Township
  - Plumstead Township

== Crossings and Bridges ==
Crossing	NBI Number	Length	Lanes	Spans	Material/Design	Built	Reconstructed	Latitude	Longitude
Pennsylvania Route 413 (Durham Road)	7036	7 metres (23 ft)	2	1	Concrete Tee Beam	1931	-	40°22'59"N	75°6'44.14"W
Valley Park Road	7541	10 metres (33 ft)	2	1	Concrete Tee Beam	1924	-	40°22'29.7"N	75°7'29.4"W
Old Easton Road	48065	9.8 metres (32 ft)	-	-	Concrete Tee Beam, Concrete Cast-in-Place Decking, Bituminous surface	1922	-	40°21'55"N	75°8'20"W
Pennsylvania Route 611 (Easton Road)	7063	7 metres (23 ft)	2	1	Concrete Tee Beam	1939	-	40°21'46.4"N	75°8'33.55"W
Silo Hill Road	7535	22 metres (72 ft)	1	1	Steel Truss Through	1902	1934	40°21'36"N	75°8'4939"W
Gayman Road	7527	18 metres (59 ft)	1	1	Steel Truss Through	-	1934	40°21'16.5"N	75°9'13.7"W
Pennsylvania Route 313 (Swamp Road)	7114	49 metres (161 ft)	2	2	Steel Stringer/Multi-beam or Girder	1970	-	40°17'28.4"N	75°12'21.26"W
North Chapman Road bike trail	7512	31 metres (102 ft)	1	1	Steel Stringer/Multi-beam or Girder	1991	-	40°20'18"N	75°10'12"W
Peace Valley Reservoir Dam	-	-	-	-	earthen dam	1974	-	-	-
Callowhill Road	44413	22 metres (72 ft)	2	1	Prestressed Concrete Box Beam or Girders - Single or Spread	2005	-	40°18'44"N	75°12'26.93"W
Creek Road	7546	20 metres (66 ft)	2	1	Prestressed concrete Box Beam or Girders - Multiple	1985	-	40°18'18"N	75°12'42"W
Park Avenue	7114	49 metres (161 ft)	2	2	Steel Stringer/Multi-beam or Girder	1970	-	40°17'28.4"N	75°12'21.26"W
East Butler Avenue	6915	42 metres (138 ft)	2	3	Concrete Tee Beam	1948	-	40°17'16.4"N	75°12'19.59"W

== See also ==
- List of rivers of Pennsylvania
- List of rivers of the United States
- List of Delaware River tributaries
