= Morgan James Homestead =

Historic house in Pennsylvania, United States

- U.S. National Register of Historic Places
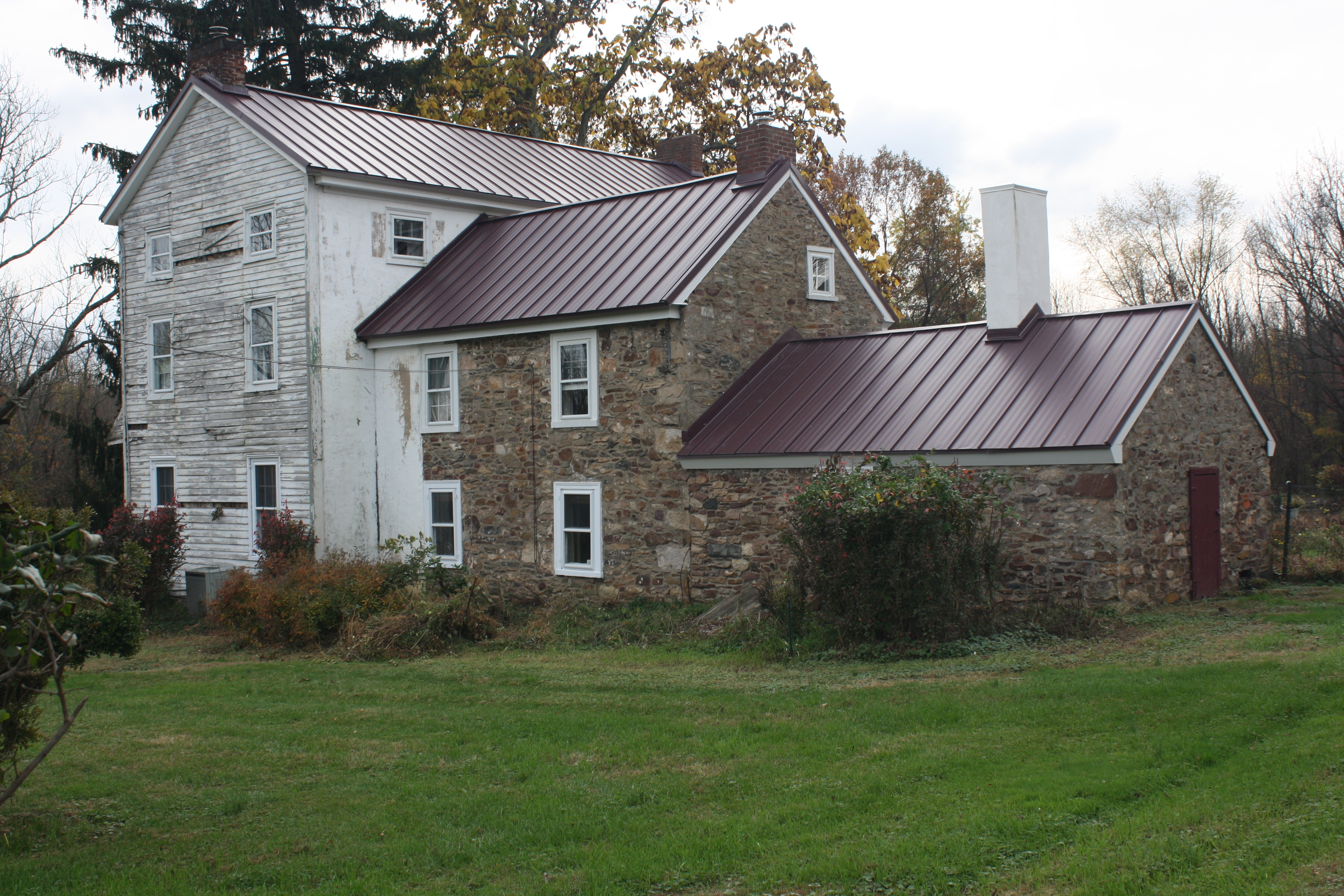
- Morgan James Homestead. October 2012.

- Location within Pennsylvania Location within the United States
- Location: Northwest of New Britain on Ferry Road, New Britain Township, Pennsylvania
- Coordinates: 40°18′19″N 75°12′4″W
- Area: 4 acres (1.6 ha)
- Built: c. 1783, 1843
- Architectural style: Federal
- NRHP reference No.: 77001127
- Added to NRHP: December 27, 1977

The Morgan James Homestead is an historic home that is located in New Britain Township, Bucks County, Pennsylvania, United States.

It was added to the National Register of Historic Places in 1977.

== History and architectural features ==
This original Federal period house was built circa 1783, and consists of a two-story, fieldstone main house with a one-story rear addition. The rear addition contains a kitchen and smokehouse. A three-story, stuccoed, stone addition with a gable roof was built circa 1840. Also located on the property is a large Pennsylvania bank barn.

== Gallery ==
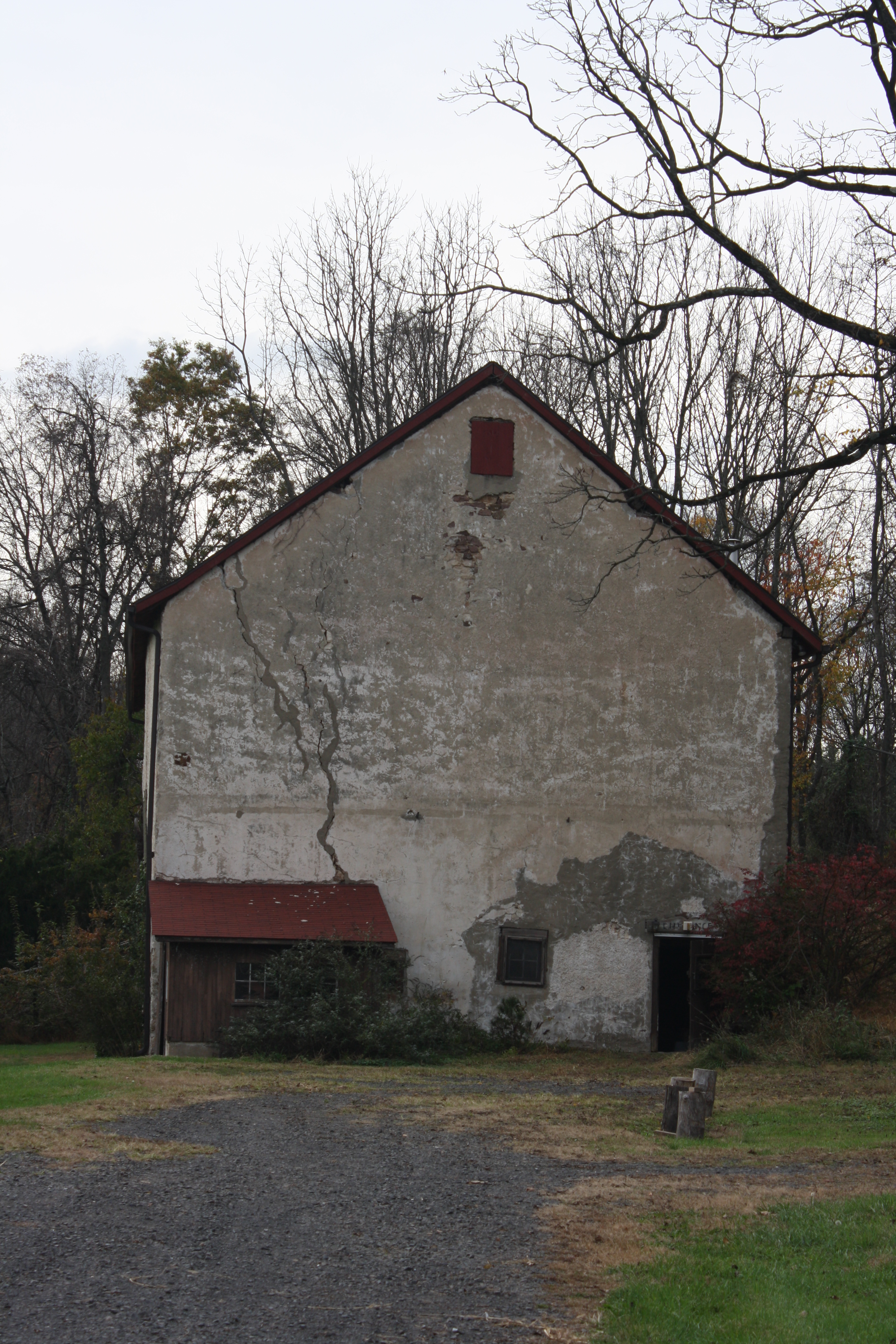
Barn
