= Newville, Bucks County, Pennsylvania =

Unincorporated community in Pennsylvania, US

Newville, Pennsylvania
- Unincorporated community
- Location within Pennsylvania Location within the United States
- Coordinates: 40°18′20″N 75°13′12″W
- Country: United States
- State: Pennsylvania
- County: Bucks
- Township: New Britain
- Elevation: 315 ft (96 m)
- Time zone: UTC-5 (Eastern (EST))
  - Summer (DST): UTC-4 (EDT)
- Area codes: 215, 267 and 445
- GNIS feature ID: 1204289

Newville is an unincorporated community in New Britain Township in Bucks County, Pennsylvania, United States. Newville is located at the intersection of Pennsylvania Route 152 and New Galena Road.
