= Pine Valley Covered Bridge =

- U.S. National Register of Historic Places
- Pine Valley Covered Bridge, February 2008

- Location within Pennsylvania Location within the United States
- Location: North of New Britain on Township 340, New Britain, Pennsylvania
- Coordinates: 40°18′19″N 75°11′16″W
- Area: 0.1 acres (0.040 ha)
- Built: 1842
- Architectural style: Town truss
- MPS: Covered Bridges of the Delaware River Watershed TR
- NRHP reference No.: 80003437
- Added to NRHP: December 01, 1980

The Pine Valley Covered Bridge, also known as the Iron Hill Bridge, is an historic, wooden covered bridge in New Britain, near Doylestown, in Bucks County, Pennsylvania, United States.

It crosses Pine Run Creek near Peace Valley Park, and was added to the National Register of Historic Places on December 1, 1980.

== History and architectural features ==
This town truss bridge, which measures 81 feet (25 m) in length, was built by David Sutton in 1842 at a cost of $5553.50. That amount is equal to $185,276.25 today.

Posted for years with a height restriction of 11 ft 6 in (3.51 m), it was reposted in 2007 to 9 ft 4 in (2.84 m) after an overheight truck passed through it and damaged the roof. It carries a posted weight rating of 24,000 pounds (11,000 kg).
