= Palmer, Virginia =

Unincorporated community in Virginia, United States

- Unincorporated community
- Location in Virginia Location in the United States
- Coordinates: 37°37′25″N 76°21′5″W
- Country: United States
- State: Virginia
- County: Lancaster
- Time zone: UTC−5 (Eastern (EST))
  - Summer (DST): UTC−4 (EDT)
- Area code: 804

Palmer is an unincorporated community in Lancaster County in the U. S. state of Virginia. Palmer is near, but not in, the flood zone. Further down from Palmer are the flooded portions of Windmill Point. It was once owned by a few families and was inhabited by lifelong residents. Many houses were later bought by people new to the community. Weekend visitors come from Northern Virginia, Richmond, Charlottesville, and Maryland.

Palmer has beaches, and there is an island in front of the community in Mosquito Creek.
