= Lake Galena (Pennsylvania) =

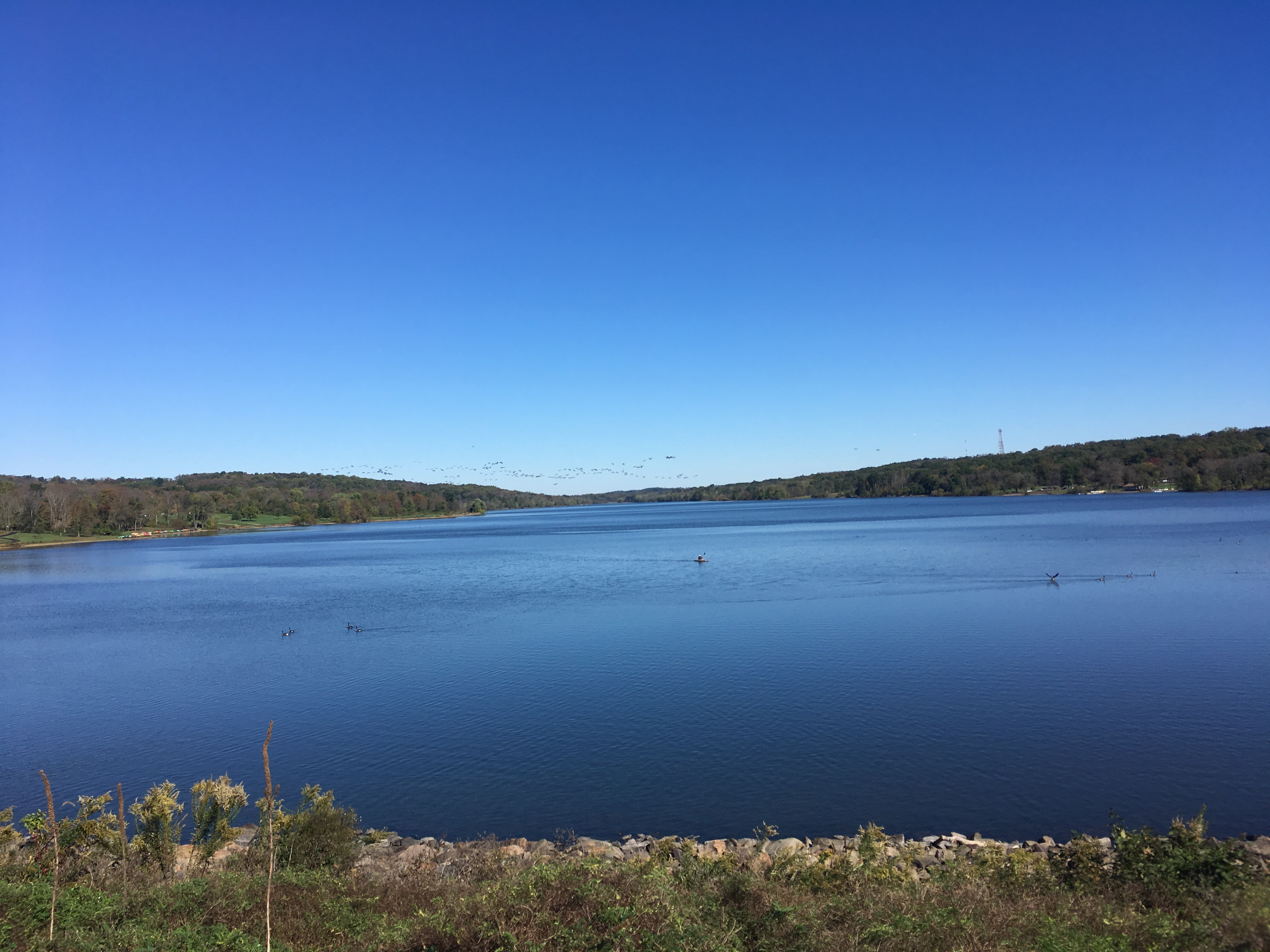
- View of Lake Galena from dam

- Location within Pennsylvania Location within the United States
- Location: New Britain Township, Bucks County, Pennsylvania, US
- Coordinates: 40.3250986°N 75.1900269°W
- Type: Reservoir
- Primary inflows: Neshaminy Creek
- Primary outflows: Neshaminy Creek
- Catchment area: 9,922 acres (40.2 km^{2})
- Basin countries: United States
- Max. length: 1.78 mi (2.86 km)
- Max. width: 0.44 mi (0.71 km)
- Surface area: 365 acres (1.5 km^{2})
- Average depth: 15 ft (4.6 m)
- Max. depth: 42 ft (13 m)
- Water volume: 55,128 acre⋅ft (67.999 hm^{3})
- Surface elevation: 321 ft (97.8 m)

Lake Galena is a reservoir in Peace Valley Park, Pennsylvania, in the United States, created in 1974 by the damming of the north branch of the Neshaminy Creek.

== History and Hydrology ==
Lake Galena in its current form was created when the county (Bucks) flooded the lake in 1972. Before that time, much of the lakebed had been part of the village of New Galena, the economy of which was based largely on farming. Mining of galena (in addition to small amounts of zinc, silver, copper and gold) had been mildly successful since the property was purchased in 1861.

A marker was erected in 1998 to commemorate the area's history.

The lake is supplemented by water from the Delaware River Point Pleasant Diversion Project for the purpose of augmenting public drinking water supplies for approximately 150,000 people in Bucks and Montgomery counties. Lake Galena supplies water to the North Penn Water Authority and the North Wales Water Authority. The water supply intake is downstream of the dam at the confluence of Pine Run and North Branch Neshaminy Creek.

== Peace Valley Park ==
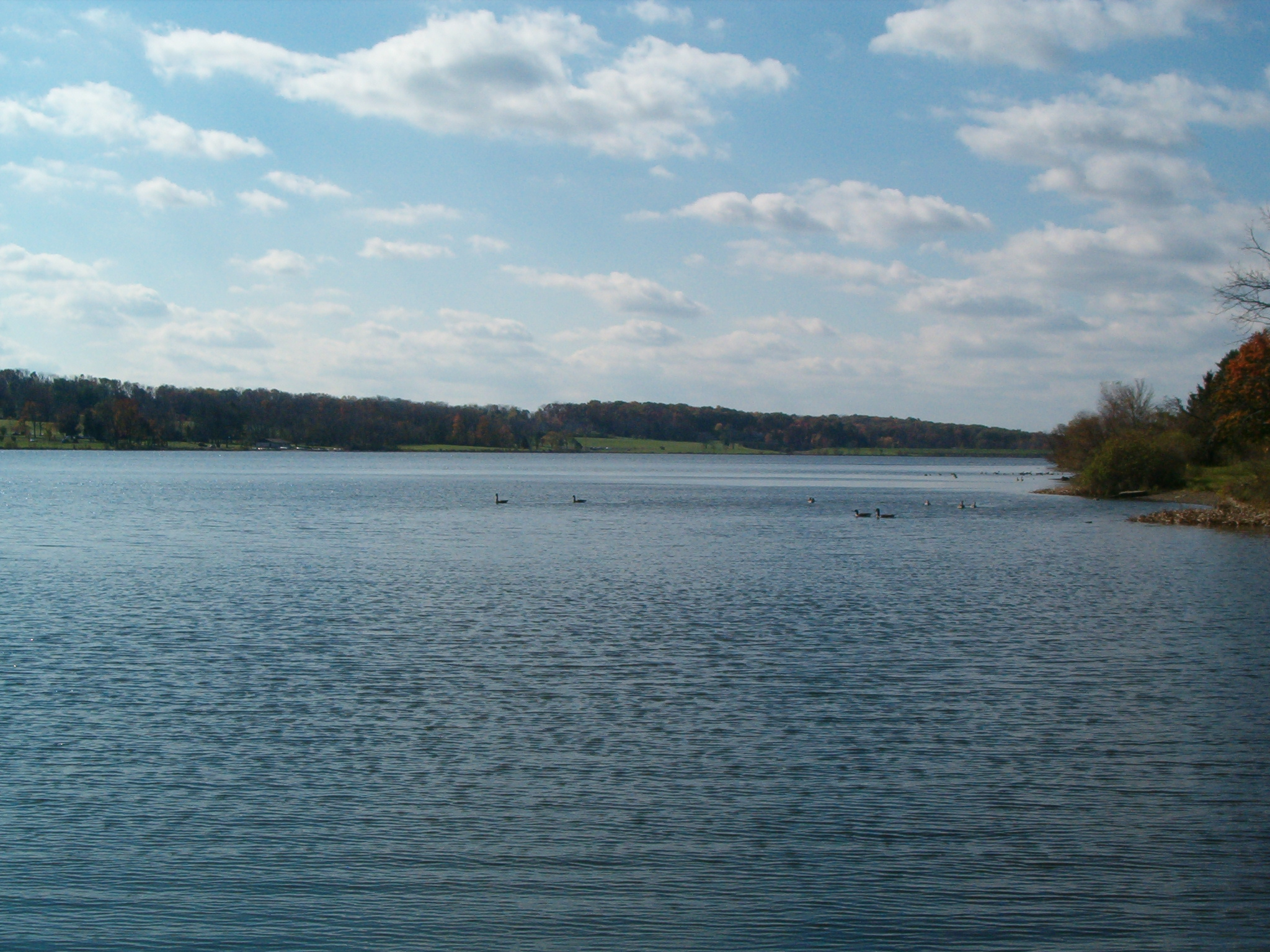
Lake Galena

Lake Galena is surrounded on all sides by Peace Valley Park. The park has a number of trails around the perimeter for walkers, cyclists and riders. Other activities include canoeing, fishing, and sailing. The distance around the lake is approximately 6 mi (9.7 km), and an annual "Friends of the Dove" 10K race is held at the lake every summer in August.
