= Peace Valley Park =

Park near Doylestown, Pennsylvania US

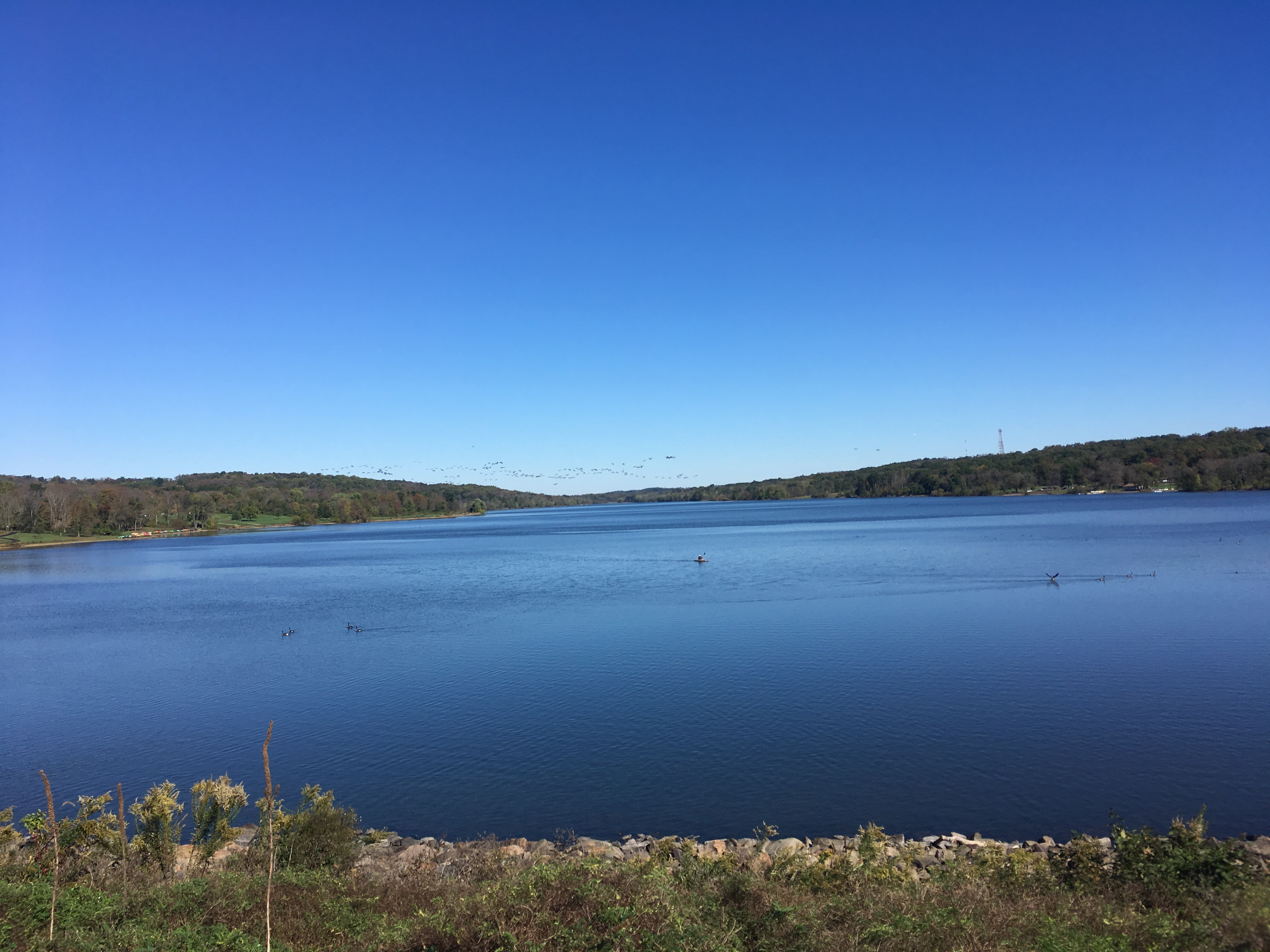
- View of Lake Galena at Peace Valley Park from dam
- Interactive map of Peace Valley Park
- Type: County park
- Location: New Britain Township, Bucks County, Pennsylvania
- Nearest city: Doylestown, Pennsylvania
- Coordinates: 40°19.61′N 75°11.33′W
- Area: 1,500 acres (6.1 km^{2})
- Operator: Bucks County Parks and Recreation
- Open: Year-round, 8 AM to sunset
- Status: Open

A sailboat on Lake Galena in Peace Valley Park

Peace Valley Park is a 1,500 acre (6 km²) park located near Doylestown, Pennsylvania. It is part of the Bucks County Park System. The park surrounds Lake Galena, a 365-acre (1.5 km^{2}) lake created by the damming of the north branch of the Neshaminy Creek.

== Activities ==
The park provides numerous recreational opportunities including playgrounds for children, facilities for hiking, biking and fishing, and sail- and paddle-boat rentals. Barbecue and picnic areas are also available throughout the park. The park has over 14 miles of maintained biking and hiking trails, many of which (including those around the lake) are paved.

Although most of the park is open to the public, access to some areas is restricted in the interest of wildlife preservation.

Lake Galena freezes over most winters; ice-skating and ice-fishing are also popular during the winter months.

== Nature Center ==
Located at the northeast end of the park (immediately on the lake) is the Peace Valley Nature Center, a facility maintained by the Bucks County Department of Parks and Recreation. The Nature Center has educational, bird-watching, and recreation facilities. The Center has a staff of 5-10 people and is partially powered by a photovoltaic system.

Parking is available immediately adjacent to the Nature Center, which also includes a small gift shop.

Carolyn "Corey" Jarin was the founder of Peace Valley Nature Center.

== Wildlife ==
Park facilities are dedicated to both the preservation and observation of wildlife. The Nature Center has a bird blind open to the public year-round. The park is designated an Important Bird Area by the National Audubon Society.

Access to some areas of the park is restricted in the interest of wildlife protection.

The park is filled with hundreds of species of flora and fauna. Over 250 bird species have been sighted at the park, ranging from common sparrows to bald eagles and other birds of prey. Canada Geese commonly migrate to the park. Other common and oft-sighted fauna include white-tailed deer, groundhogs, various species of fish, rabbits, and turtles.
