= New Britain Township, Pennsylvania =

Township in Pennsylvania, US

New Britain Township
- Township
- Pine Valley Covered Bridge

- Seal

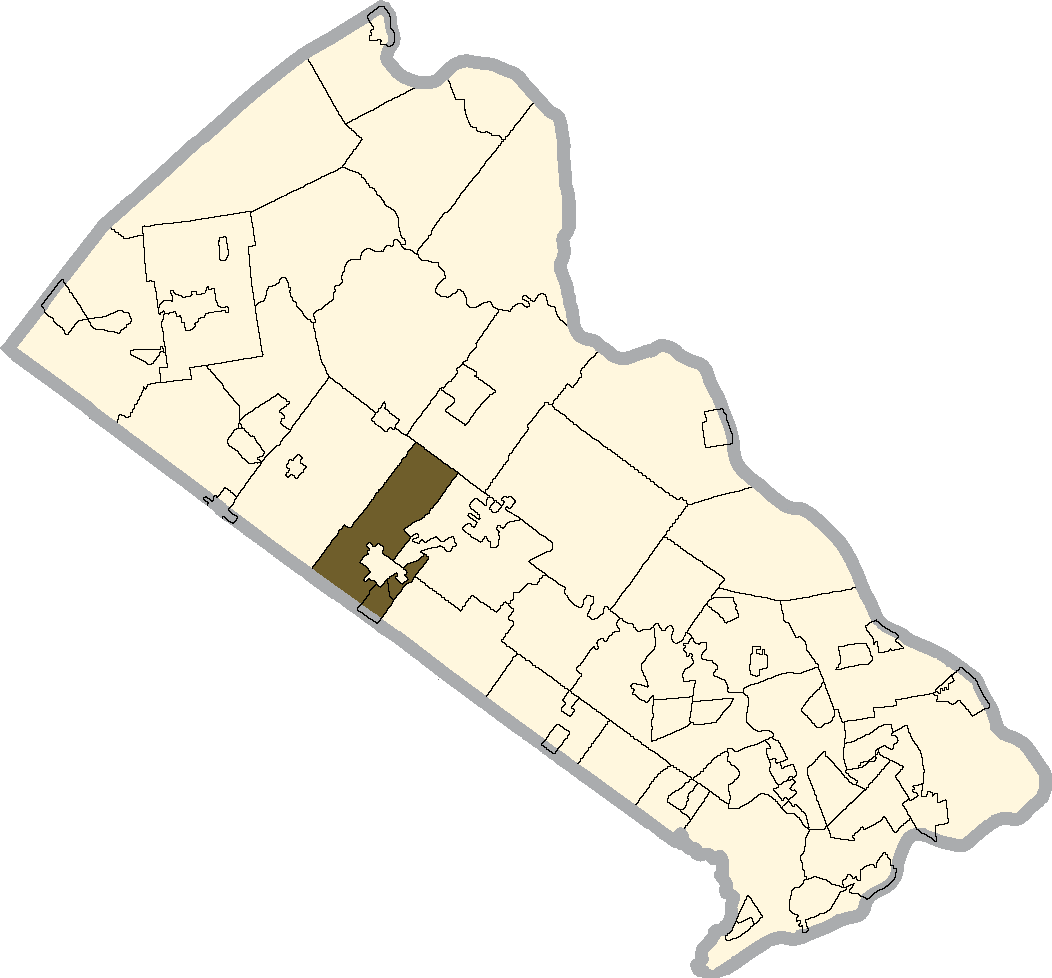
- Location of New Britain Township in Bucks County

- Location of New Britain Township in Pennsylvania New Britain Township (the United States)
- Coordinates: 40°17′55″N 75°10′24″W
- Country: United States
- State: Pennsylvania
- County: Bucks
- Founded: 1723

Government
  - Body: Board of Supervisors
  - Chairman: A. James Scanzillo
  - Vice Chair: John A. Bodden
  - Member: Helen Haun; William B. Jones; Gregory T. Hood

Area
  - Total: 15.29 sq mi (39.6 km^{2})
  - Land: 14.68 sq mi (38.0 km^{2})
  - Water: 0.61 sq mi (1.6 km^{2})
- Elevation: 276 ft (84 m)

Population (2020)
  - Total: 12,327
  - Estimate (2023): 12,277
  - Density: 839.4/sq mi (324.1/km^{2})
- Time zone: UTC-5 (Eastern (EST))
  - Summer (DST): UTC-4 (EDT)
- Area codes: 215, 267, and 445
- FIPS code: 42-017-53304
- Website: www.newbritaintownship.org

New Britain Township is a township in Bucks County, Pennsylvania, United States. The population was 12,327 at the 2020 census.

== History ==
New Britain Township was founded in 1723. The Township was comprised more than 15,000 acres and included land which is now occupied by Chalfont Borough and New Britain Borough as well as the later established Doylestown Township. The Township currently encompasses 14.7 square miles (9900 acres). According to historical research conducted by Township volunteers, it is estimated that the Lenni Lenape Indians arrived in New Britain Township as early as 1397. The Morgan James Homestead and Pine Valley Covered Bridge are listed on the National Register of Historic Places.

== Geography ==
According to the United States Census Bureau, the township has a total area of 15.2 square miles (39.5 km^{2}), of which 14.7 square miles (38.1 km^{2}) is land and 0.6 square mile (1.4 km^{2}) (3.61%) is water. It is drained by the Delaware River via the Neshaminy Creek. Its villages include Christy (also in Montgomery County,) Fountainville, Line Lexington (also in Hilltown Township and Montgomery County,) Naces Corner, New Galena, and Newville. Brittany Farms-The Highlands CDP is also located in the township.

Natural features include Cooks Run, Iron Hill, Neshaminy Creek, Pine Run, Prospect Hill, and Royal Hill. New Britain Township is home to Peace Valley Park, a county park that surrounds Lake Galena, a reservoir along the North Branch Neshaminy Creek.

=== Neighboring municipalities ===
- Hilltown Township (northwest)
- Plumstead Township (northeast)
- Doylestown Township (east)
- New Britain (east)
- Chalfont (east)
- Warrington Township (southeast)
- Montgomery Township, Montgomery County (south)
- Hatfield Township, Montgomery County (southwest)

== Demographics ==
Historical population
| Census | Pop. | Note | %± |
|---|---|---|---|
| 1930 | 1,157 | | — |
| 1940 | 1,119 | | −3.3% |
| 1950 | 1,361 | | 21.6% |
| 1960 | 3,090 | | 127.0% |
| 1970 | 5,207 | | 68.5% |
| 1980 | 7,415 | | 42.4% |
| 1990 | 9,099 | | 22.7% |
| 2000 | 10,698 | | 17.6% |
| 2010 | 11,070 | | 3.5% |
| 2020 | 12,327 | | 11.4% |

As of the 2020 census, the township was 86.6% White, 3.5% Black or African American, 0.0% Native American, 3.4% Asian, and 3.6% were two or more races. 4.2% of the population were of Hispanic or Latino ancestry.

As of the census of 2000, there were 10,698 people, 3,895 households, and 3,034 families residing in the township. The population density was 727.6 inhabitants per square mile (280.9/km^{2}). There were 3,969 housing units at an average density of 270.0 per square mile (104.2/km^{2}). The racial makeup of the township was 96.26% White, 1.35% African American, 0.12% Native American, 1.14% Asian, 0.43% from other races, and 0.70% from two or more races. Hispanic or Latino of any race were 1.28% of the population.

There were 3,895 households, out of which 38.0% had children under the age of 18 living with them, 68.8% were married couples living together, 7.1% had a female householder with no husband present, and 22.1% were non-families. 18.4% of all households were made up of individuals, and 6.6% had someone living alone who was 65 years of age or older. The average household size was 2.74 and the average family size was 3.14.

In the township the population was spread out, with 27.4% under the age of 18, 4.6% from 18 to 24, 29.7% from 25 to 44, 26.5% from 45 to 64, and 11.9% who were 65 years of age or older. The median age was 39 years. For every 100 females there were 95.3 males. For every 100 females age 18 and over, there were 91.3 males.

The median income for a household in the township was $71,194, and the median income for a family was $77,896. Males had a median income of $57,188 versus $34,390 for females. The per capita income for the township was $28,923. About 1.4% of families and 1.9% of the population were below the poverty line, including 2.3% of those under age 18 and 1.7% of those age 65 or over.

== Climate ==
According to the Köppen climate classification system, New Britain Township, Pennsylvania has a hot-summer, wet all year, humid continental climate (Dfa). Dfa climates are characterized by at least one month having an average mean temperature ≤ 32.0 °F (≤ 0.0 °C), at least four months with an average mean temperature ≥ 50.0 °F (≥ 10.0 °C), at least one month with an average mean temperature ≥ 71.6 °F (≥ 22.0 °C), and no significant precipitation difference between seasons. During the summer months, episodes of extreme heat and humidity can occur with heat index values ≥ 100 °F (≥ 38 °C). On average, the wettest month of the year is July which corresponds with the annual peak in thunderstorm activity. During the winter months, episodes of extreme cold and wind can occur with wind chill values < 0 °F (< -18 °C). The plant hardiness zone is 6b with an average annual extreme minimum air temperature of -1.4 °F (-18.6 °C). The average seasonal (Nov-Apr) snowfall total is between 30 and 36 inches (76 and 91 cm), and the average snowiest month is February which corresponds with the annual peak in nor'easter activity.

Climate data for New Britain Township, Bucks County, Pennsylvania (1981 – 2010 averages)
| Month | Jan | Feb | Mar | Apr | May | Jun | Jul | Aug | Sep | Oct | Nov | Dec | Year |
|---|---|---|---|---|---|---|---|---|---|---|---|---|---|
| Mean daily maximum °F (°C) | 38.5 (3.6) | 41.8 (5.4) | 50.1 (10.1) | 62.3 (16.8) | 72.2 (22.3) | 80.9 (27.2) | 85.0 (29.4) | 83.3 (28.5) | 76.4 (24.7) | 65.0 (18.3) | 54.1 (12.3) | 42.7 (5.9) | 62.8 (17.1) |
| Daily mean °F (°C) | 29.7 (−1.3) | 32.5 (0.3) | 40.1 (4.5) | 51.0 (10.6) | 60.7 (15.9) | 69.8 (21.0) | 74.3 (23.5) | 72.8 (22.7) | 65.4 (18.6) | 53.8 (12.1) | 44.1 (6.7) | 34.2 (1.2) | 52.5 (11.4) |
| Mean daily minimum °F (°C) | 21.0 (−6.1) | 23.2 (−4.9) | 30.1 (−1.1) | 39.7 (4.3) | 49.2 (9.6) | 58.8 (14.9) | 63.6 (17.6) | 62.2 (16.8) | 54.3 (12.4) | 42.5 (5.8) | 34.2 (1.2) | 25.7 (−3.5) | 42.1 (5.6) |
| Average precipitation inches (mm) | 3.33 (85) | 2.71 (69) | 3.79 (96) | 3.99 (101) | 4.34 (110) | 4.31 (109) | 4.92 (125) | 4.04 (103) | 4.51 (115) | 4.19 (106) | 3.68 (93) | 3.96 (101) | 47.77 (1,213) |
| Average relative humidity (%) | 67.3 | 64.1 | 59.9 | 58.6 | 62.9 | 68.3 | 68.3 | 70.6 | 72.2 | 70.7 | 69.6 | 69.3 | 66.8 |
| Average dew point °F (°C) | 20.2 (−6.6) | 21.7 (−5.7) | 27.3 (−2.6) | 37.0 (2.8) | 48.0 (8.9) | 58.9 (14.9) | 63.2 (17.3) | 62.7 (17.1) | 56.2 (13.4) | 44.5 (6.9) | 34.8 (1.6) | 25.2 (−3.8) | 41.7 (5.4) |
Source: PRISM Climate Group

== Transportation ==
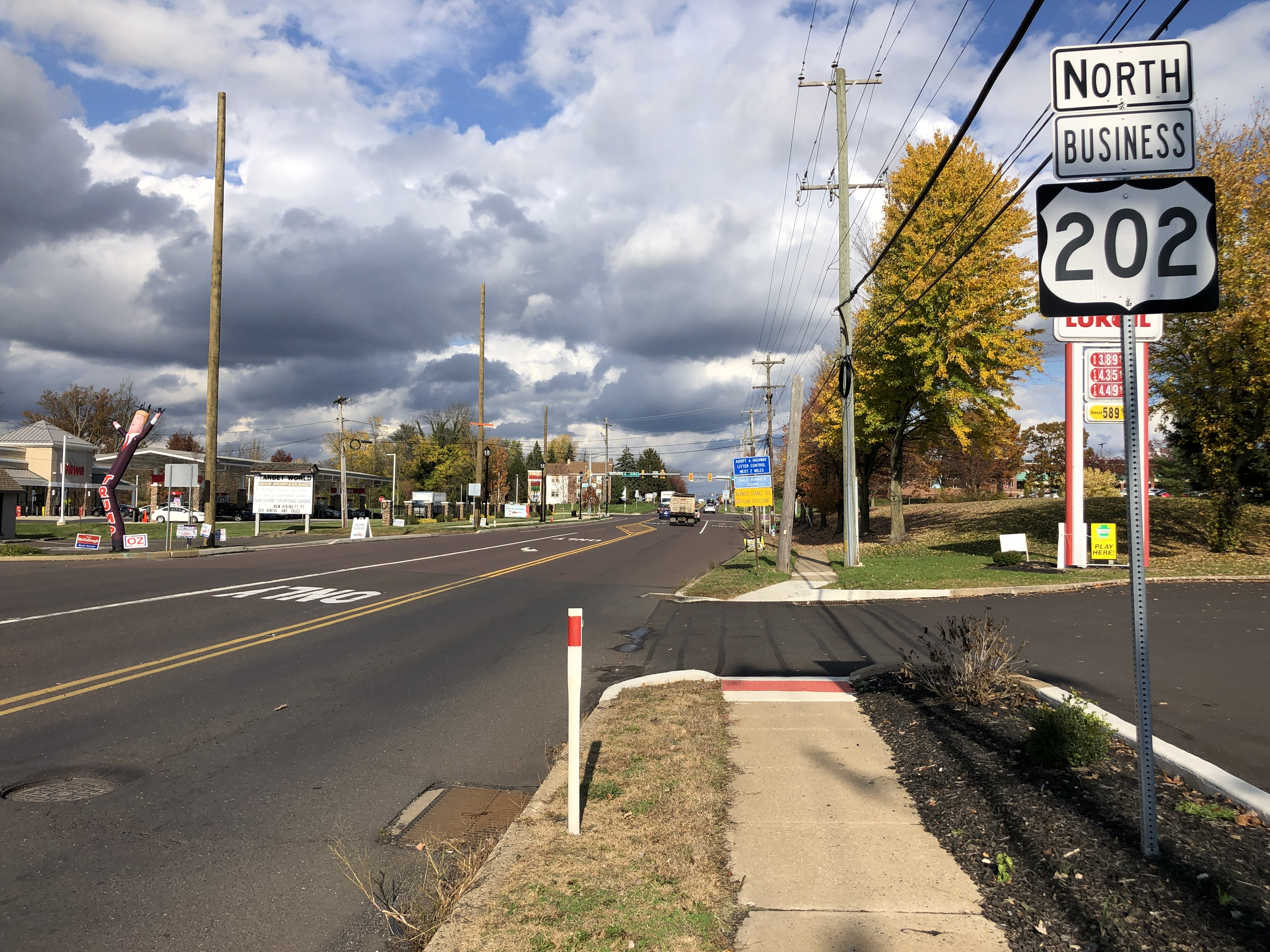
U.S. Route 202 Business northbound in New Britain Township

As of 2022 there were 81.11 miles (130.53 km) of public roads in New Britain Township, of which 21.53 miles (34.65 km) were maintained by the Pennsylvania Department of Transportation (PennDOT) and 59.58 miles (95.88 km) were maintained by the township.

Numbered highways passing through New Britain Township include U.S. Route 202 Business, Pennsylvania Route 152 and Pennsylvania Route 313. US 202 Business follows the old route of U.S. Route 202 along Butler Avenue in the southern section of the township. PA 152 follows Limekiln Pike along a northwest-southeast alignment through southern and western sections of the township. Finally, PA 313 follows Swamp Road along a northwest-southeast alignment creating the northeastern border of the township.

SEPTA Regional Rail's Lansdale/Doylestown Line passes through New Britain Township, with the Chalfont station, New Britain station, and Link Belt station located within proximity to the township. Bucks County Transport operates the DART West bus that serves New Britain Township, which runs weekdays through Chalfont and New Britain to a connection with the Doylestown DART bus to Doylestown at Delaware Valley University.

== Education ==
Most of the township is in the Central Bucks School District, while a small portion in the southwest corner encompassing most of the Line Lexington community is in North Penn School District.

== Ecology ==
According to the A. W. Kuchler U.S. potential natural vegetation types, New Britain Township, Pennsylvania would have an Appalachian Oak (104) vegetation type with an Eastern Hardwood Forest (25) vegetation form.

== Culture ==
National Shrine of Our Lady of Czestochowa is in the township.
