= Bensalem =

Bensalem means "son of peace" or "son of submission". It is composed of two Semitic words; either 1) "ben" (בן) - "son", and "salem" or "shalem" (שלם) - "whole" or "complete"; or 2) "ben" (בן) - "son", and "salam" (سلام) - "peace".

It may refer to:

== People ==
- Ben Salem Himmich, Moroccan novelist
- Zohra Bensalem, Algerian volleyball player
- Ahmed Ben Salem, Algerian leader

== Places ==
- Bensalem High School, public high school in Bensalem, Pennsylvania
- Bensalem Township, Pennsylvania, township in Bucks County, Pennsylvania
- Bensalem Township School District, School district in Bucks County, Pennsylvania

== See also ==
- New Atlantis
