= Pennsylvania Route 513 =

State highway in Bucks County, Pennsylvania, US

Pennsylvania Route 513

Route information
- Maintained by PennDOT
- Length: 6.522 mi (10.496 km)

Major junctions
- South end: US 13 in Bensalem Township
- PA 132 in Bensalem Township; US 1 Bus. in Penndel
- North end: PA 413 in Penndel

Location
- Country: United States
- State: Pennsylvania
- Counties: Bucks

Highway system
- Pennsylvania State Route System; Interstate; US; State; Scenic; Legislative
← PA 512	→ PA 514

Pennsylvania Route 513 (PA 513) is a 6.5-mile-long (10.5 km) state highway in Bucks County, Pennsylvania. The route runs from U.S. Route 13 (US 13) in Bensalem Township north to PA 413 in Penndel. The route passes through suburban areas in lower Bucks County, serving Bensalem Township, Hulmeville, and Penndel. PA 513 has intermediate junctions with PA 132 in Bensalem Township and US 1 Business (US 1 Bus.) in Penndel. PA 513 was designated in 1928 between US 13 in Cornwells Heights and PA 101 near South Langhorne. By 1947, PA 513 was rerouted to its current northern terminus, replacing a part of PA 113.

== Route description ==
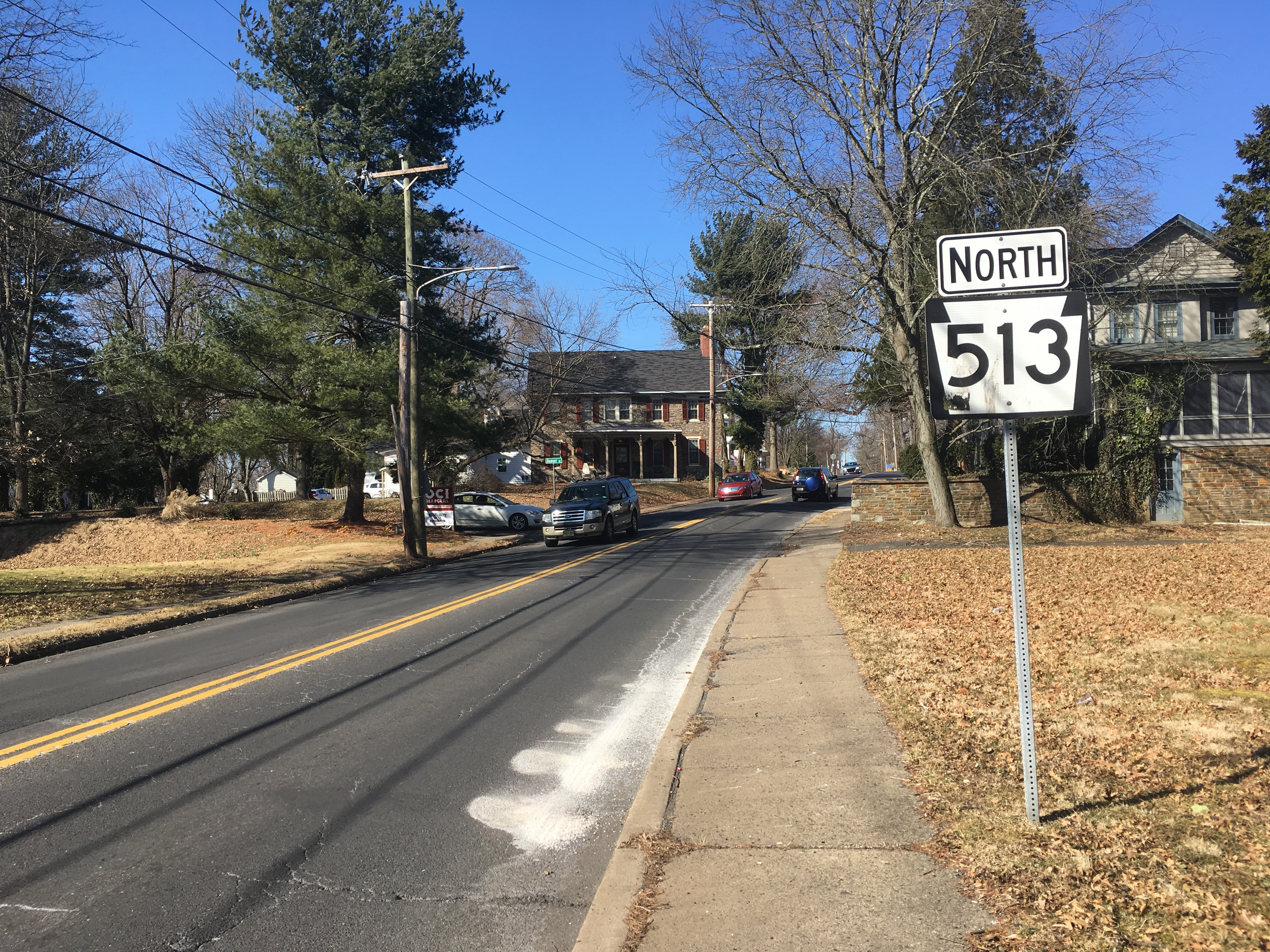
PA 513 northbound in Hulmeville

PA 513 begins at an intersection with US 13 in the Cornwells Heights section of Bensalem Township, Bucks County, heading northeast on two-lane undivided Hulmeville Road. The route passes through suburban residential areas, running to the east of Bensalem Township Country Club. The road crosses PA 132 in a commercial area, where it becomes a three-lane road with a center left-turn lane. PA 513 heads through areas of homes and businesses, passing to the west of Bensalem High School. The road comes to a bridge over the Pennsylvania Turnpike (Interstate 276) and continues through suburban development as a two-lane road. The route crosses the Neshaminy Creek into the borough of Hulmeville, where it turns north onto Bellevue Avenue at the Trenton Road intersection and passes through wooded areas of homes. The road continues north into the borough of Penndel and runs past more homes and businesses, reaching an intersection with US 1 Bus. (Lincoln Highway). A short distance later, PA 513 comes to its northern terminus at an intersection with PA 413, at which point Bellevue Avenue continues north as PA 413.

== History ==
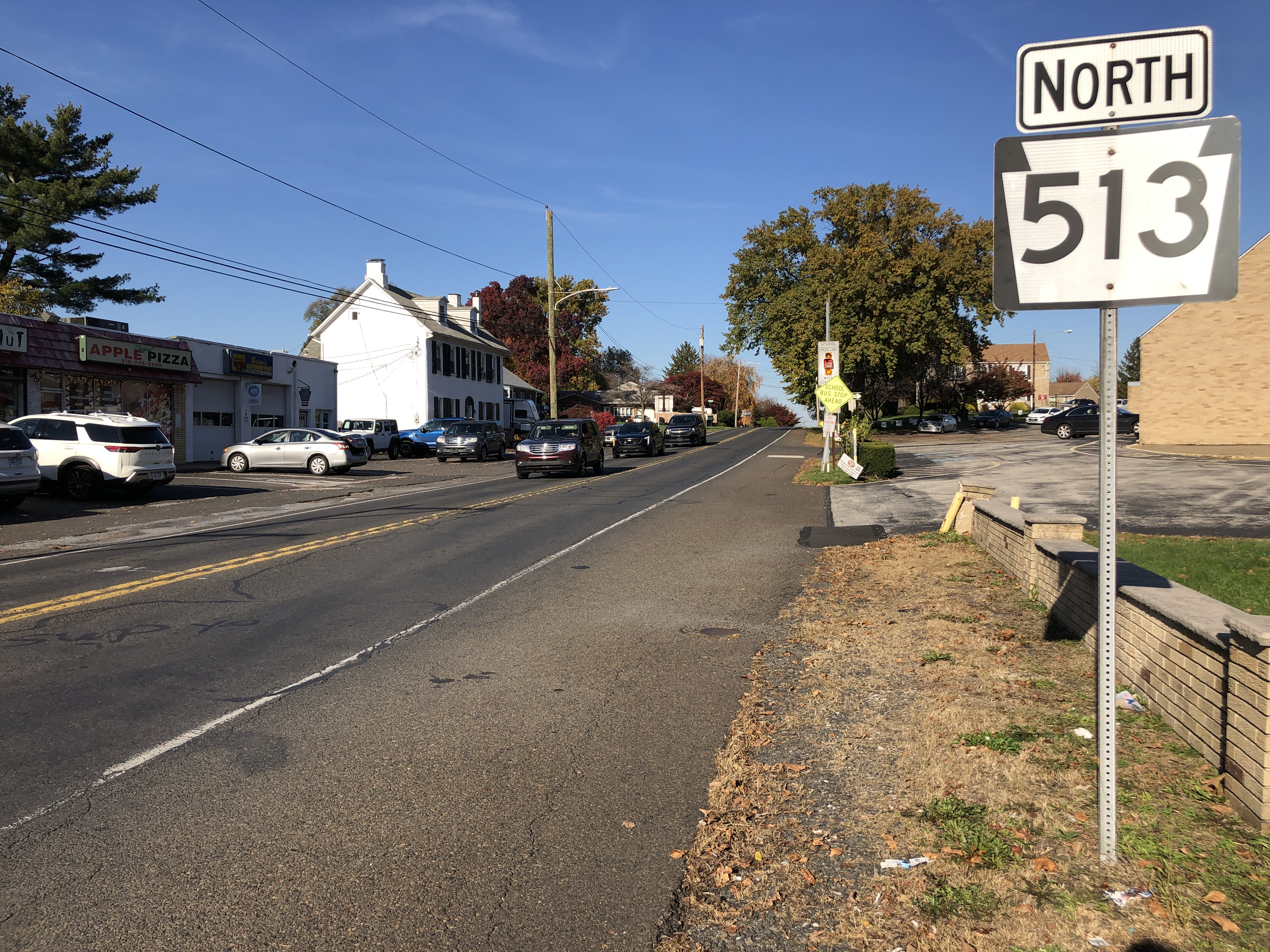
PA 513 northbound past US 13 in Bensalem Township

By 1911, what is now PA 513 was a paved road between present-day US 13 and PA 132 while the remainder was unpaved. PA 513 was designated in 1928 to run from US 13 in Cornwells Heights north to PA 101 (Durham Road) near South Langhorne, following its present alignment to Hulmeville and continuing northeast on Trenton Road to PA 101. By this time, the entire route was paved. By 1947, PA 513 was realigned at Hulmeville to head north to US 1 (now US 1 Bus.) and PA 413 in Penndel, replacing a portion of PA 113.

== Major intersections ==
The entire route is in Bucks County.

Location	mi	km	Destinations	Notes
Bensalem Township	0.000	0.000	US 13 (Bristol Pike)	Southern terminius
Bensalem Township	1.630	2.623	PA 132 (Street Road) – Southampton, Eddington	
Penndel	6.444	10.371	US 1 Bus. (Lincoln Highway)	
Penndel	6.522	10.496	PA 413 (Bellevue Avenue / Durham Road)	Northern terminus
1.000 mi = 1.609 km; 1.000 km = 0.621 mi
