= U.S. Route 13 in Pennsylvania =

Highway in Pennsylvania

U.S. Route 13
- US 13 highlighted in red

Route information
- Maintained by PennDOT and City of Philadelphia
- Length: 49.359 mi (79.436 km)

Major junctions
- South end: US 13 at the Delaware state line in Marcus Hook
- US 322 in Chester; PA 3 in Philadelphia; I-76 / US 30 in Philadelphia; PA 611 in Philadelphia; US 1 in Philadelphia; PA 73 in Philadelphia; PA 63 in Bensalem Township; PA 132 in Bensalem Township; PA 413 in Bristol; I-95 / Penna Turnpike in Bristol Township
- North end: US 1 in Falls Township

Location
- Country: United States
- State: Pennsylvania
- Counties: Delaware, Philadelphia, Bucks

Highway system
- United States Numbered Highway System; List; Special; Divided; Pennsylvania State Route System; Interstate; US; State; Scenic; Legislative
← PA 12	→ PA 13

U.S. Route 13 (US 13) is a United States Numbered Highway running from Fayetteville, North Carolina, north to Morrisville, Pennsylvania. The route runs for 49.359 miles (79.436 km) through the Philadelphia metropolitan area in the U.S. state of Pennsylvania. The route enters the state from Delaware in Marcus Hook, Delaware County. It continues northeast through Delaware County, passing through the city of Chester before heading through suburban areas along Chester Pike to Darby. US 13 enters the city of Philadelphia on Baltimore Avenue and runs through West Philadelphia to University City, where it turns north along several city streets before heading east across the Schuylkill River along Girard Avenue. The route turns north and heads to North Philadelphia, where it runs northeast along Hunting Park Avenue. US 13 becomes concurrent with US 1 on Roosevelt Boulevard, continuing into Northeast Philadelphia. US 13 splits southeast on a one-way pair of streets before heading northeast out of the city on Frankford Avenue. The route continues into Bucks County as Bristol Pike, heading northeast to Bristol, where it becomes a divided highway. US 13 becomes a freeway in Tullytown and continues north to its terminus at US 1 in Falls Township, near Morrisville. US 13 roughly parallels Interstate 95 (I-95) through its course in Pennsylvania.

The routing dates back to colonial times as part of the King's Highway. In the 19th century, the road was part of several turnpikes, including the Darby and Ridley Turnpike (or Chester Pike) between Chester and Darby and the Frankford and Bristol Turnpike between Philadelphia and Morrisville. In the early 20th century, these private turnpikes became public roads. US 13 was designated through Pennsylvania in 1926, running between the Delaware border in Marcus Hook and US 1 in Morrisville. The route was designated concurrent with Pennsylvania Route 91 (PA 91) between the Delaware border and Philadelphia and PA 32 between Philadelphia and Morrisville; these concurrent state route designations were removed in 1928. US 13 originally ran through Darby on Main Street and Philadelphia on Woodland Avenue, Market Street, Broad Street, Diamond Street, Front Street, Kensington Avenue, and Frankford Avenue. In the 1930s, the route was shifted to use MacDade Boulevard, Whitby Avenue, 44th Street, Powelton Avenue, 31st and 32nd streets, Spring Garden Street, Broad Street, Roosevelt Boulevard, Levick Street, and Frankford Avenue through the city; it ran concurrent with US 1 through most of the city. Between the 1930s and 1960s, three bypass routes existed for portions of US 13 between Marcus Hook and Philadelphia. The divided highway alignment between Bristol and Tullytown was completed by 1950. The US 13 freeway between Tullytown and US 1 was completed in 1955, shifting the northern terminus to its current location. This freeway was once considered to become a part of I-95 that would pass through Trenton, New Jersey, before it was decided for the Interstate to bypass Trenton to the north. A US 13 freeway was again proposed between I-95 near Bristol and Tullytown in 1969 but was ultimately cancelled. The route was shifted to use 43rd and 44th streets, Powelton Avenue, 34th Street, Girard Avenue, 33rd Street, Ridge Avenue, and Hunting Park Avenue in Philadelphia in the 1950s. US 13 was rerouted to use Church Lane and Baltimore Avenue between Yeadon and West Philadelphia in the 1960s. The route was shifted to its current alignment through Philadelphia the 1970s. US 13 was realigned through Chester in 2022, with US 13 Business (US 13 Bus.) designated onto the former alignment.

== Route description ==
=== Delaware County ===
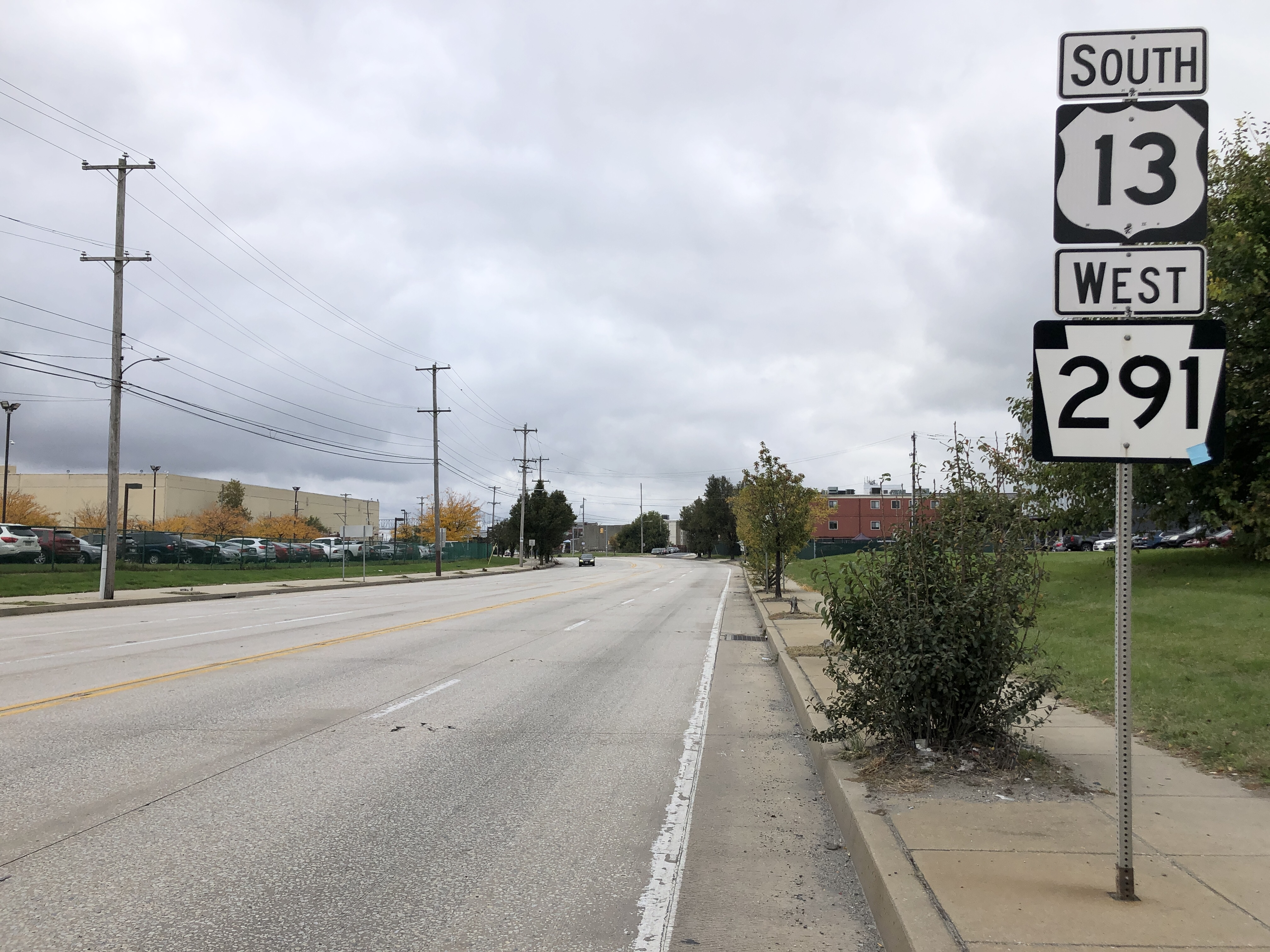
US 13 southbound/PA 291 westbound in Chester

US 13 enters Pennsylvania from Delaware in the borough of Marcus Hook in Delaware County, heading northeast on four-lane undivided Post Road. From the state line, the route has a grade crossing with a railroad spur and passes through Sunoco's Marcus Hook Industrial Complex. The road narrows to two lanes and crosses a railroad spur at-grade serving the industrial complex before it heads into the commercial center of Marcus Hook as 10th Street, intersecting the southern terminus of PA 452. US 13 crosses Conrail Shared Assets Operations (CSAO)'s Linwood Track line at-grade and runs between residential areas to the north and industrial areas to the south before it heads across the Marcus Hook Creek into the borough of Trainer. The route becomes Post Road again and passes between homes and some businesses to the north and Delta Air Lines's Trainer Refinery to the south before it crosses Stoney Creek and reaches a junction with the western terminus of PA 291 and the southern terminus of US 13 Bus., where US 13 Bus. continues northeast along Post Road and US 13 turns southeast for a concurrency with PA 291 on two-lane undivided Price Street.

The road passes between homes to the northeast and industrial areas to the southwest. The two routes make a sharp curve to the northeast and become West 2nd Street, crossing into the city of Chester and running through urban residential and industrial areas. US 13/PA 291 continues northeast and becomes a five-lane road with a center left-turn lane as it passes more urban development and empty lots. The two routes come to ramps that provide access from the eastbound direction of US 322 and to the westbound direction of US 322 just northwest of where that route crosses the Delaware River on the Commodore Barry Bridge. The road passes under the western approach of the Commodore Barry Bridge carrying US 322. Following this, US 13/PA 291 passes more urban homes and businesses as it heads northwest of the Port of Chester along the Delaware River. The two routes split from West 2nd Street and continue northeast as an unnamed road, crossing Chester Creek before passing south of Chester's City Hall and north of the William Penn Landing Site. US 13/PA 291 intersects the southern terminus of PA 320 (Madison Street northbound and Upland Street southbound), at which point the road becomes East 4th Street. The road continues through commercial areas and US 13 splits from PA 291 by turning north onto two-lane undivided Morton Avenue. The road passes under Amtrak's Northeast Corridor railroad line and runs through urban areas, intersecting the northern terminus of US 13 Bus. at East 9th Street. US 13 continues through urban development, curving to the northeast.

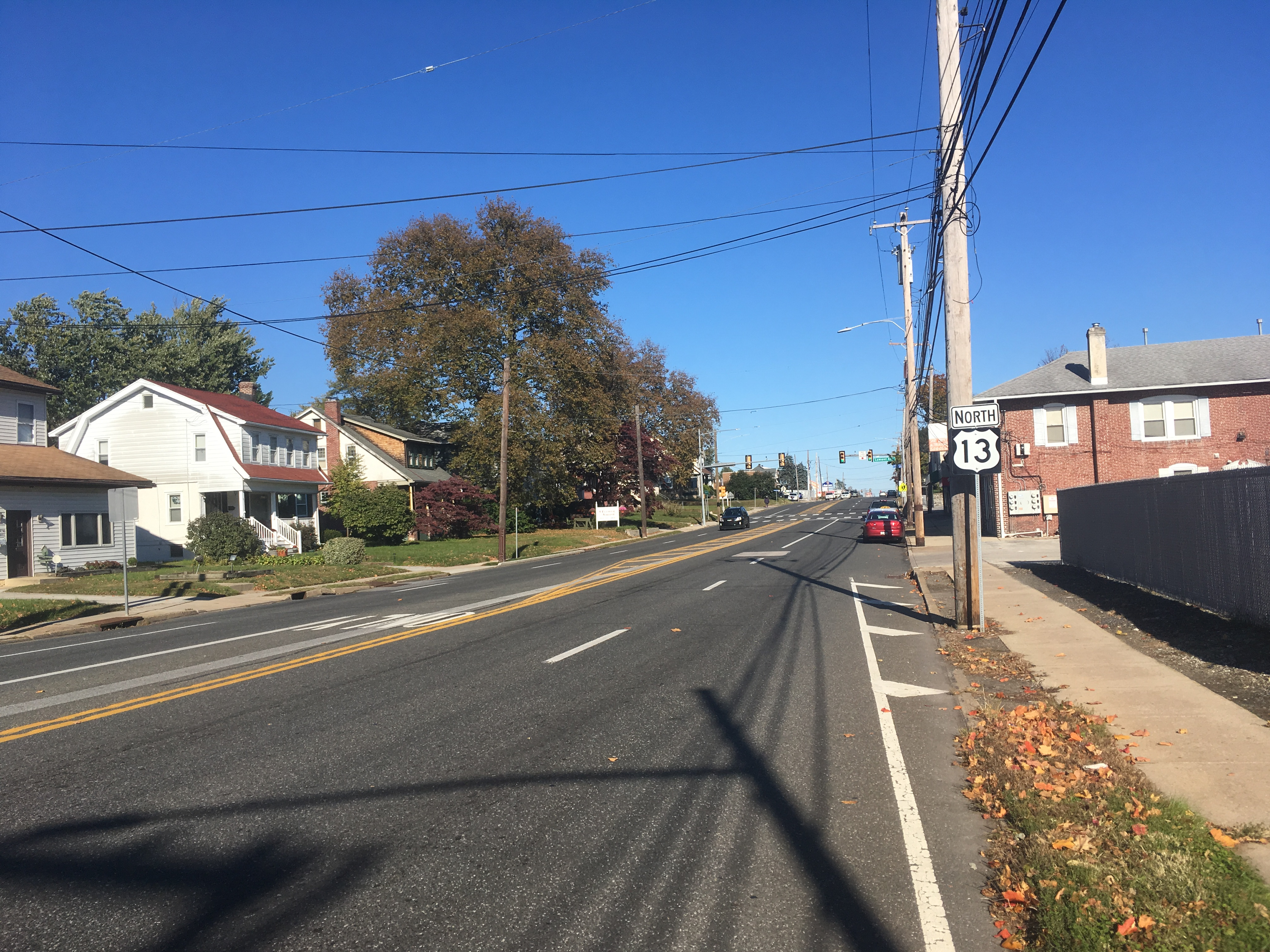
US 13 northbound in Glenolden

US 13 crosses the Ridley Creek and forms the border between Ridley Township to the north and the borough of Eddystone to the south, widening to four lanes and becoming Chester Pike. The road passes a mix of homes and businesses before it comes to a bridge over Crum Creek, at which point it fully enters Ridley Township. The route passes under I-95 and continues past commercial development in the community of Crum Lynne, gaining a center left-turn lane. US 13 enters the borough of Ridley Park and passes under the Northeast Corridor near Crum Lynne station serving SEPTA's Wilmington/Newark Line before it heads into residential areas and intersects Stewart Avenue, which heads southeast to provide access to I-95. The route continues past suburban homes and businesses as a four-lane undivided road, passing to the southeast of the former Taylor Hospital. The road forms the border between Ridley Park to the north and Ridley Township to the south before it enters the borough of Prospect Park and comes to an intersection with PA 420. US 13 continues northeast through suburban areas and runs along the border between Prospect Park to the north and the borough of Norwood to the south before fully entering Norwood. The route crosses Muckinipattis Creek into the borough of Glenolden and passes under the Northeast Corridor again. The road runs past more homes and businesses and passes through a small section of the borough of Folcroft, where it crosses Hermesprota Creek, before crossing into the borough of Sharon Hill. There, US 13 passes south of Sharon Hill station which serves as the terminus of the SEPTA Route 102 trolley line before continuing past more development. The road curves north at the point it crosses over a short tunnel carrying CSX Transportation's Philadelphia Subdivision railroad line and enters the borough of Collingdale, continuing to an intersection with MacDade Boulevard.

At this point, Chester Pike splits to the east and US 13 continues north along four-lane undivided MacDade Boulevard, crossing Darby Creek into the borough of Darby. The route passes to the west of the bus terminal at SEPTA's Darby Transportation Center and curves northeast at the Main Street intersection into urban neighborhoods, narrowing to two lanes. The road passes to the south of Holy Cross Cemetery, where it enters the borough of Yeadon, before it passes through more residential areas. US 13 turns north-northwest onto Church Lane and runs through more residential neighborhoods. The route comes to a bridge over SEPTA's Media/Wawa Line west of Fernwood–Yeadon station and crosses into Upper Darby Township, where it comes to an intersection with Baltimore Pike. Here, US 13 turns east onto Baltimore Pike and runs between Fernwood Cemetery to the north and urban residential and commercial development to the south. Farther east, the road passes through a corner of Yeadon.

=== Philadelphia County ===
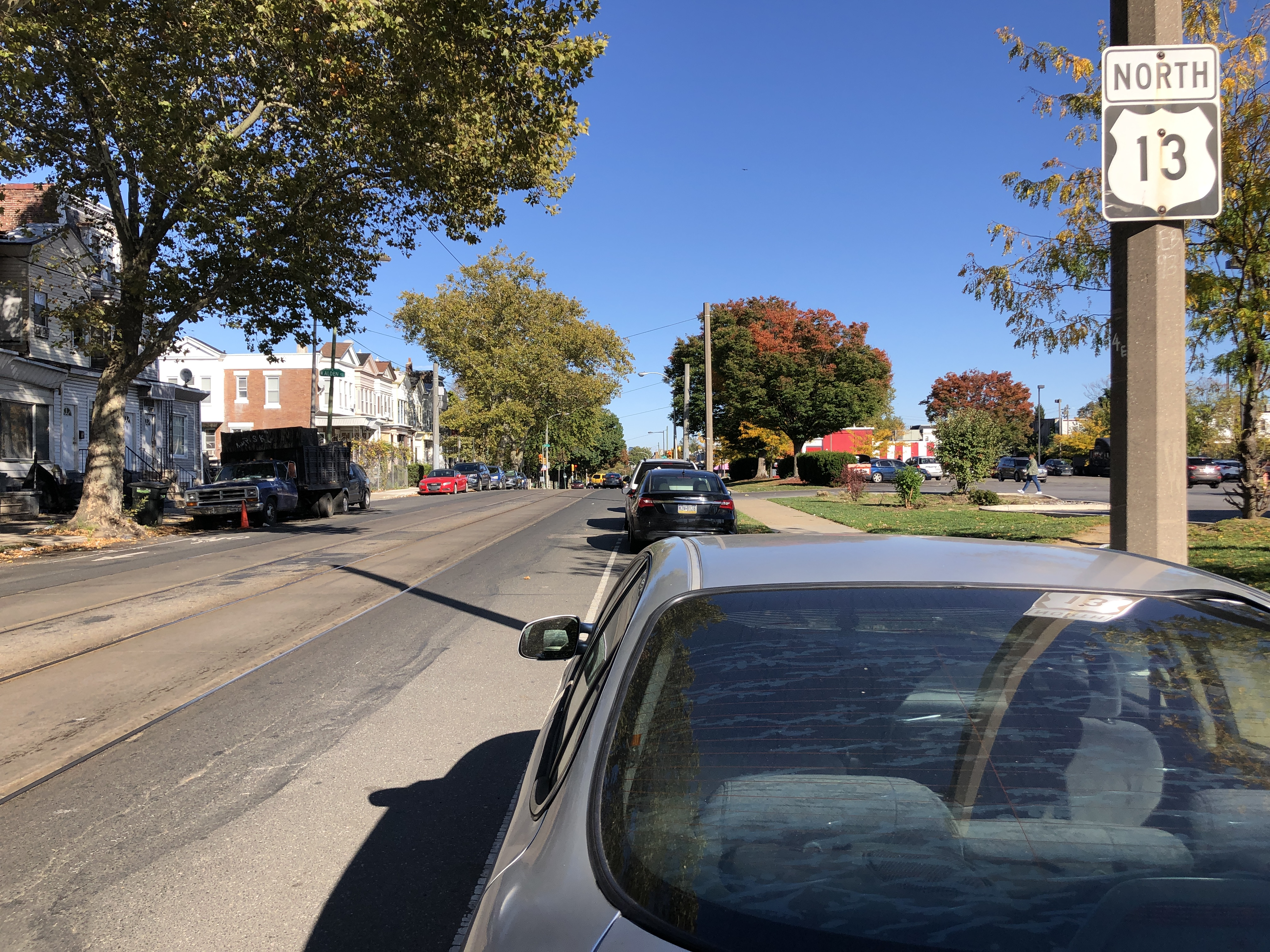
US 13 (Baltimore Avenue) northbound in West Philadelphia

US 13 crosses Cobbs Creek into the West Philadelphia section of the city of Philadelphia in Philadelphia County, where the name changes to Baltimore Avenue. Immediately after crossing the creek, the road comes to the Angora Loop at 61st Street, which serves as the terminus of the SEPTA Route 34 trolley line. At this point, the trolley tracks follow Baltimore Avenue as it continues through urban neighborhoods consisting of rowhouses along with a few businesses. The road curves to the east, passing through more urban development and crossing a set of SEPTA trolley tracks at 42nd Street. The Route 34 trolley line splits from Baltimore Avenue at 40th Street, where it heads into a subway tunnel at the 40th Street Portal. The road heads into the University City neighborhood and becomes four lanes at the 39th Street/Woodland Avenue intersection, at which point it runs between the University of Pennsylvania campus to the north and the Philadelphia VA Medical Center to the south. A block later, Baltimore Avenue ends and US 13 turns north onto four-lane divided University Avenue. The route continues north through the university campus and becomes 38th Street as it reaches an intersection with Spruce Street, where a SEPTA trolley track begins to follow the northbound lanes of the road. The roadway intersects Walnut Street, which is one-way westbound and carries the westbound direction of PA 3. At this point, westbound PA 3 becomes concurrent with southbound US 13, and 38th Street continues north through commercial areas. The road crosses one-way Chestnut Street, which carries eastbound PA 3, before coming to the junction with two-way Market Street, where westbound PA 3 turns onto southbound US 13 from Market Street. US 13 continues to follow four-lane divided 38th Street north, with the SEPTA trolley track splitting west at Filbert Street. The road passes to the east of Penn Presbyterian Medical Center before it comes to an intersection with Powelton Avenue.

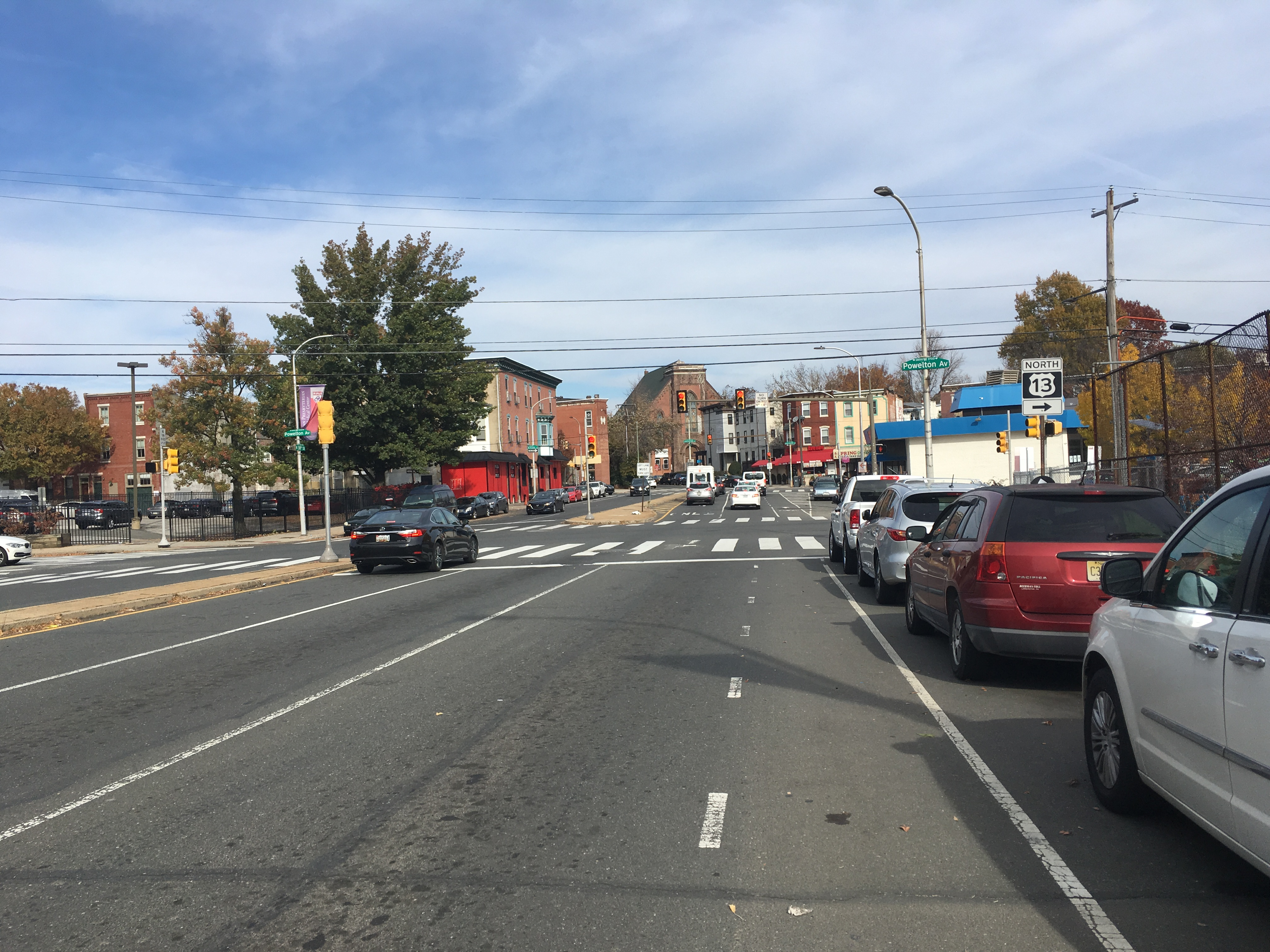
US 13 northbound approaching the turn from 38th Street to Powelton Avenue in West Philadelphia

At this point, US 13 turns east onto two-lane undivided Powelton Avenue, which is city-maintained. The route crosses Lancaster Avenue, which carries the SEPTA Route 10 trolley line, and continues into residential areas. US 13 turns north and splits into a one-way pair, running along 33rd Street northbound and 34th Street southbound. The northbound direction carries one lane of traffic while the southbound direction carries two lanes of traffic. The route follows 33rd and 34th streets north through the Mantua neighborhood, passing homes and a few businesses. At Mantua Avenue, northbound US 13 turns northwest to rejoin the southbound direction on 34th Street. Upon rejoining, US 13 continues north on four-lane undivided 34th Street and comes to a bridge over several railroad tracks carrying Amtrak's Northeast Corridor and CSX Transportation's Harrisburg Subdivision railroad lines before running between the Philadelphia Zoo to the west and the Schuylkill Expressway (I-76/US 30) to the east. US 13 continues north to Girard Avenue, where it comes to interchange ramps with the Schuylkill Expressway. At this point, US 30 splits from the Schuylkill Expressway and heads west on Girard Avenue while US 13 turns east from 34th Street onto Girard Avenue, becoming state-maintained again. US 13 heads east along Girard Avenue, which carries four lanes of traffic and the SEPTA Route 15 trolley line. The Girard Avenue Bridge carries the route over the Schuylkill Expressway, Martin Luther King Jr. Drive, a trail, the Schuylkill River, the Schuylkill River Trail, and Kelly Drive on the other side of the river. Past the bridge, the road enters Fairmount Park, and ramps provide access to Kelly Drive.

US 13 splits from Girard Avenue and turns north onto two-lane undivided 33rd Street. The route comes to bridges over CSX Transportation's Trenton Subdivision and the Northeast Corridor railroad lines before it runs between wooded Fairmount Park to the west and the urban Strawberry Mansion neighborhood to the east, intersecting Cecil B. Moore Avenue east of SEPTA's 33rd and Cecil B. Moore Bus Loop. The road passes to the east of East Park Reservoir before it heads west of SEPTA's 33rd and Dauphin Bus Loop and comes to Ridge Avenue. At this point, US 13 turns northwest onto four-lane undivided Ridge Avenue and continues between the park to the west and urban homes to the east before it runs between Laurel Hill Cemetery to the west and Mount Vernon Cemetery to the east. The route reaches an interchange with Hunting Park Avenue that provides access to Kelly Drive to the west, at which point the route splits from Ridge Avenue and heads northeast onto four-lane undivided Hunting Park Avenue. The road continues into North Philadelphia and heads into urban areas of homes, businesses, and industry, crossing Allegheny Avenue and passing northwest of Mercy Career & Technical High School before reaching bridges under SEPTA's Manayunk/Norristown and Chestnut Hill West lines. US 13 continues into the Nicetown–Tioga neighborhood and has a junction with Wissahickon Avenue before passing north of SEPTA's 23rd and Venango Bus Loop. Past here, the road intersects Erie Avenue before it crosses under the SEPTA Main Line. The route passes north of Simon Gratz High School Mastery Charter before it intersects Germantown Avenue and comes to a bridge over CSAO's Richmond Industrial Track line. Hunting Park Avenue splits to the east, at which point the route becomes Roosevelt Boulevard. US 13 follows Roosevelt Boulevard through commercial areas and crosses PA 611 (Broad Street), where left turns are prohibited; Hunting Park Avenue provides access from northbound US 13 to PA 611 while Bristol Street provides access from southbound US 13 to PA 611. After this, the route crosses Old York Road before it comes to an interchange with US 1 (Roosevelt Expressway) and merges onto the northbound direction of that route to the north of the Hunting Park neighborhood.

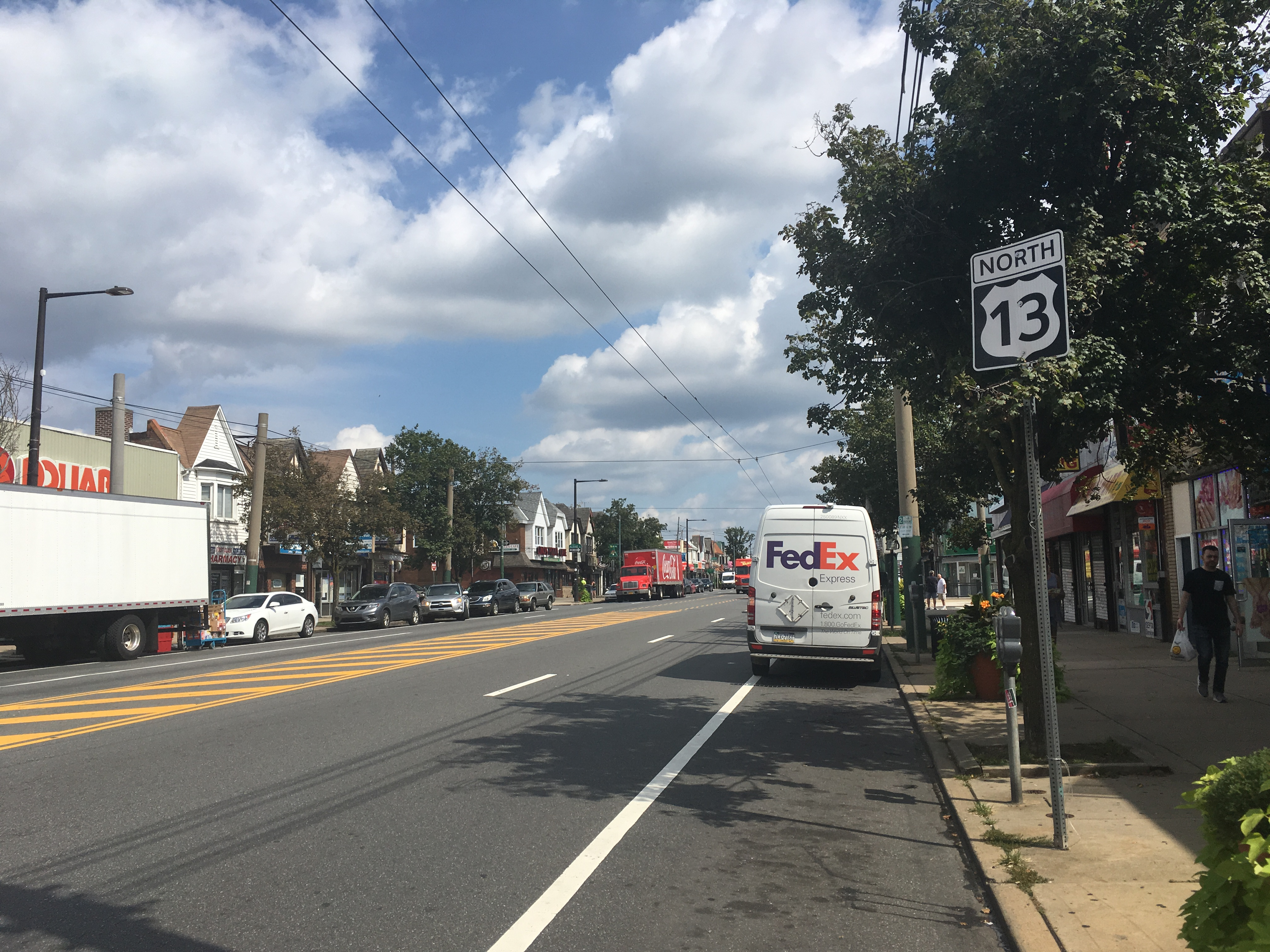
US 13 (Frankford Avenue) northbound past PA 73 (Cottman Avenue) in the Mayfair neighborhood in Northeast Philadelphia

At this point, US 1 becomes concurrent with US 13 on Roosevelt Boulevard, a wide boulevard with local–express lanes that has 12 lanes total in a 3–3–3–3 configuration. Along the Roosevelt Boulevard, access between the inner and outer carriageways is provided with narrow crossover ramps immediately between them; for most intersections, left turns are only permitted from the inner pair (or from separate left turn roadways) and right turns only from the outer, and crossing between them is not permitted at the intersections. There are speed cameras along the boulevard and many intersections also have red light cameras. The boulevard continues past urban residential neighborhoods, passing over an abandoned railroad grade before coming to the 5th Street junction, where the local lanes intersect the street at-grade and the express lanes pass over the street on a bridge. US 1/US 13 continues east and passes through the Feltonville neighborhood, where it intersects Rising Sun Avenue, before it crosses the Tacony Creek. At this point, Roosevelt Boulevard continues into Northeast Philadelphia and curves to the southeast at an intersection with Adams and Whitaker avenues, passing between a shopping center to the northeast and Friends Hospital to the southwest. The boulevard curves to the northeast again at a junction with Adams Avenue and Summerdale Avenue, passing near rowhouses before reaching the Oxford Circle. At this point, the local lanes pass through the Oxford Circle, a traffic circle at Cheltenham Avenue, Castor Avenue, and the southern terminus of PA 232, which runs along Oxford Avenue. The express lanes pass under the Oxford Circle. Past the circle, Roosevelt Boulevard continues east-northeast through residential areas.

The road crosses Bustleton Avenue and US 13 splits from US 1 and the Roosevelt Boulevard by heading southeast on the one-way pair of Robbins Street northbound and Levick Street southbound, with Robbins Street carrying two lanes of one-way traffic and Levick Street carrying three lanes of one-way traffic. The route follows Robbins and Levick streets through residential neighborhoods, crossing Harbison Avenue before reaching Frankford Avenue. At this point, both directions of US 13 continue northeast on Frankford Avenue, a four-lane undivided road, while Robbins and Levick streets continue southeast towards the Tacony–Palmyra Bridge over the Delaware River. The road passes through business areas and heads into the Mayfair neighborhood, where it intersects PA 73 (Cottman Avenue). The route continues into the Holmesburg neighborhood and runs through more commercial areas, crossing Rhawn Street. US 13 passes under CSAO's Bustleton Industrial Track line and crosses Pennypack Creek in a wooded area within Pennypack Park on the Frankford Avenue Bridge, intersecting the Pennypack Trail after the bridge. After this, the route becomes a three-lane road with a center left-turn lane that passes a mix of homes and businesses in the Torresdale neighborhood, intersecting Academy Road. The road continues through developed areas and passes northwest of SEPTA's Gregg Street Bus Loop before it crosses Grant Avenue. From here, the route passes northwest of Holy Family University before heading past residential and commercial development and reaching an intersection with Knights Road, where SEPTA's Frankford and Knights Bus Loop is located south of the road.

=== Bucks County ===
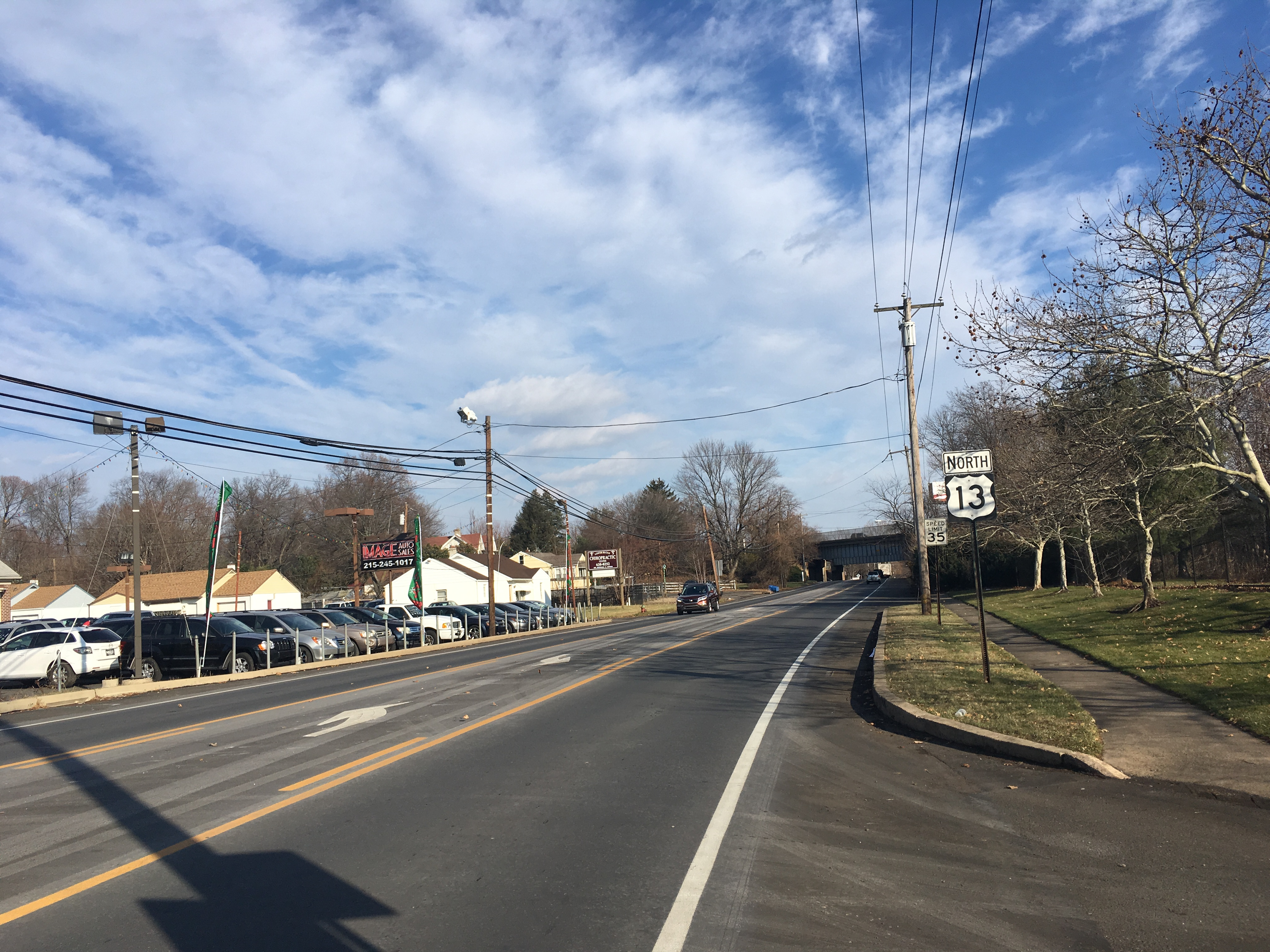
US 13 northbound in Bensalem Township

US 13 crosses Poquessing Creek into Bensalem Township in Bucks County, where the name becomes Bristol Pike. The road runs northeast past suburban homes and businesses in the community of Andalusia before it widens into a divided highway in a commercial area and reaches a partial cloverleaf interchange with the PA 63 freeway (Woodhaven Road) a short distance northwest of I-95. Past this, the route gains a center left-turn lane and comes to an intersection with the southern terminus of PA 513. US 13 continues past a mix of residences and commercial establishments in the community of Cornwells Heights, passing northwest of Holy Ghost Preparatory School. Farther northeast, the road comes to a partial cloverleaf interchange with PA 132 immediately northwest of that route's eastern terminus at I-95. Following PA 132, US 13 continues past businesses immediately to the northwest of I-95. The route intersects Bensalem Boulevard and curves east to pass under I-95 before coming to a bridge over Neshaminy Creek. Upon crossing the creek, the road enters Bristol Township and heads into the community of Croydon, where it passes businesses and runs to the north of the Croydon station along SEPTA's Trenton Line that follows Amtrak's Northeast Corridor. US 13 continues east between residential neighborhoods to the north and the Northeast Corridor railroad tracks immediately to the south. Farther east, the road passes to the south of a cemetery before reaching a junction with PA 413.

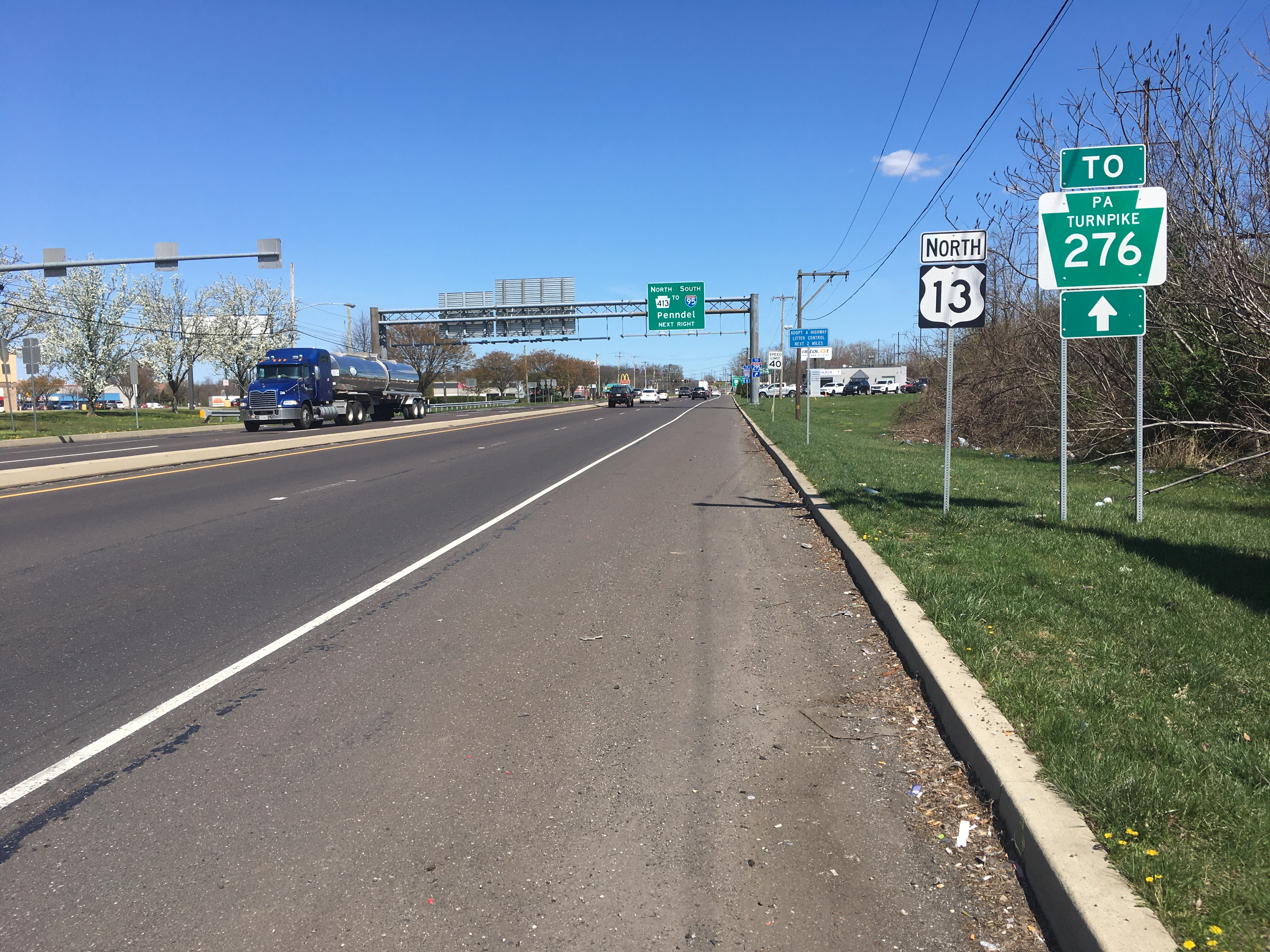
US 13 northbound past PA 413 in Bristol

Following this intersection, the route enters the borough of Bristol and widens into a four-lane divided highway with multiple intersections controlled by jughandles, heading northeast through business areas further from the railroad tracks and crossing Mill Creek. The road briefly passes through Bristol Township as it heads south of Silver Lake and curves northeast. US 13 continues through the northern part of the borough of Bristol, running through commercial areas and passing to the west of residential neighborhoods. The route reenters Bristol Township upon crossing Adams Hollow Creek and passes through commercial areas with some woods before coming to an intersection with a ramp that provides access to the Pennsylvania Turnpike (I-95) at an interchange. Past this ramp, the road passes through commercial areas and crosses an East Penn Railroad line at-grade before passing under the Delaware River–Turnpike Toll Bridge which carries I-95 over the Delaware River. US 13 crosses the Delaware Canal and runs past more businesses. The route crosses into the borough of Tullytown and passes between the Levittown Town Center shopping center to the west and Levittown station serving SEPTA's Trenton Line on the adjacent Northeast Corridor to the east.

Bristol Pike splits off to the northeast and US 13 heads north as a freeway, forming the border between Tullytown to the west and Falls Township to the east. The freeway fully enters Falls Township and has an interchange with Mill Creek Road, with a northbound exit and entrance and a southbound exit at Mill Creek Road and the southbound entrance provided by Fallsington-Tullytown Road further south. Following this, the route passes between the planned residential suburb of Levittown to the west and Falls Township Community Park to the east. US 13 intersects Penn Valley Road at a diamond interchange before it heads northeast through woods, crossing Martins Creek, and comes to a cloverleaf interchange with Tyburn Road. The freeway curves north and has a partial cloverleaf interchange with Lower Morrisville Road before it passes over CSAO's Morrisville Line at the Morrisville Yard. After this, US 13 reaches its northern terminus at a partial cloverleaf interchange with the US 1 freeway to the west of the borough of Morrisville. Past this interchange, the freeway ends and the road continues north as Pine Grove Road, which is an unsigned quadrant route designated State Route 2071, toward Yardley.

== History ==
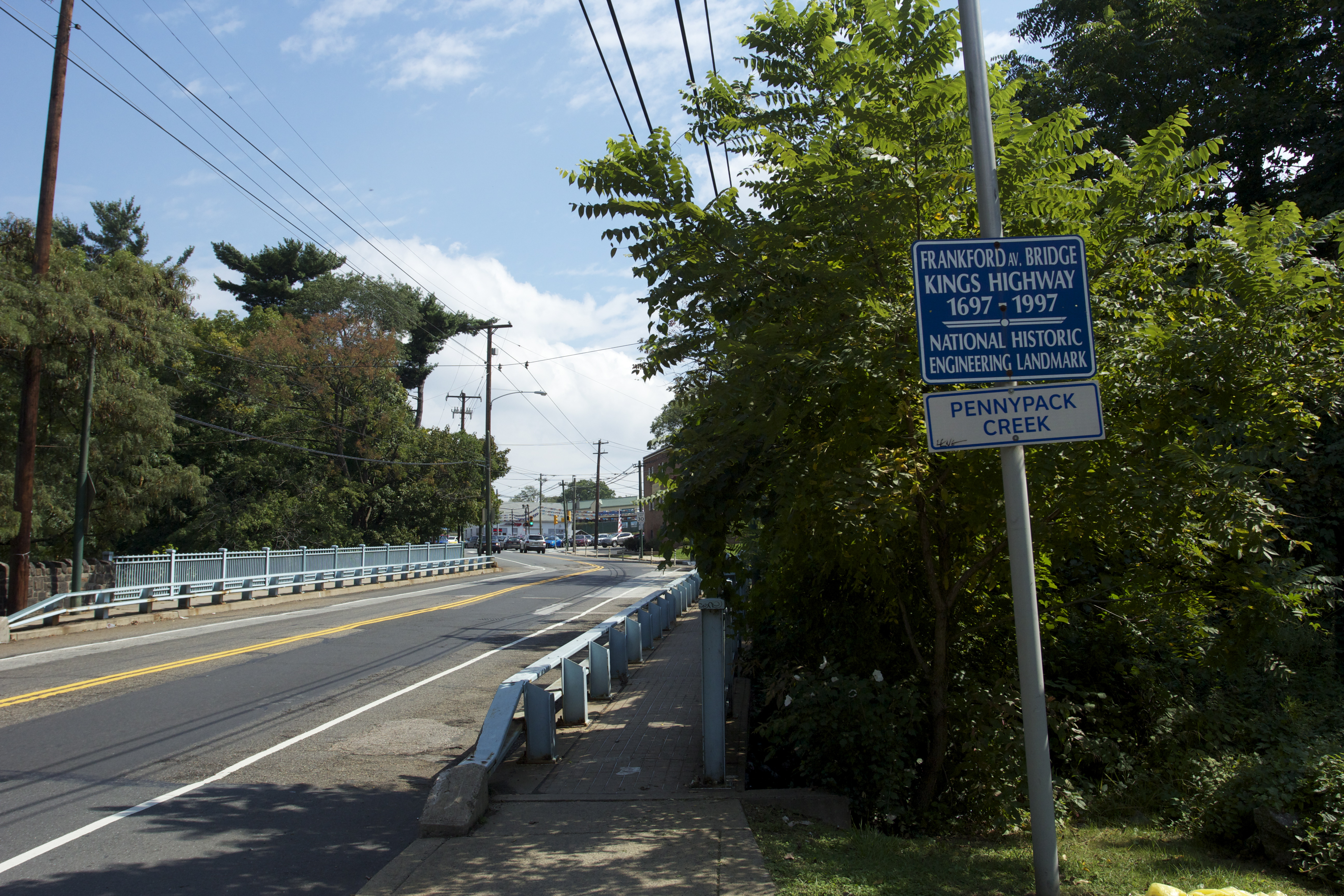
US 13 crosses the Pennypack Creek on the Frankford Avenue Bridge, the oldest bridge in the United States, built in 1697

The roadway between Marcus Hook and Morrisville via Philadelphia was originally part of the King's Highway, a colonial road named in honor of King Charles II of England. The King's Highway bridge over the Pennypack Creek in what is now Northeast Philadelphia was built in 1697 and is the oldest bridge in continuous use in the United States. During the reign of Anne, Queen of Great Britain, it was called the Queen's Highway. Published in 1940, the Pennsylvania Guide noted that, between Glenolden and Darby, "US-13 now occasionally coincides with the Queen's Highway, an important Colonial road. Impassibility was the rule rather than the exception on this link between the North and South, as it was on all early roads. As late as 1834, the mail coach had to be dragged through the mud by oxen."

After the British surrendered in the Siege of Yorktown in 1781, the road between Marcus Hook and Darby became known as the Great Southern Post Road as it served as a post road. This section of road has also been known as the Darby–Chester Road and Plank Road. In 1851, the roadway between Chester and Darby was chartered by the state as the Darby and Ridley Turnpike or the Chester Pike, a privately owned turnpike. The turnpike was a plank road with tolls collected at multiple toll houses along the route. In 1921, the state and Delaware County took over the turnpike with each paying $50,000 (equivalent to $694,000 in 2024). Improvements to the road between Chester and Darby were completed on August 12, 1926. What is now Baltimore Pike and Baltimore Avenue was originally chartered as the Philadelphia, Brandywine, and New London Turnpike on March 24, 1808, later becoming known as the Delaware County Turnpike. On May 13, 1803, the Philadelphia, Frankford, and Bristol Turnpike was chartered. This turnpike ran between Front Street and Germantown Road in Northern Liberties and a ferry across the Delaware River in Morrisville via Frankford and Bristol. The Frankford and Bristol Turnpike was completed in July 1812. The Frankford and Bristol Turnpike was sold to the city of Philadelphia on July 1, 1892, with trolley service introduced in 1895. The trolley line along Frankford Avenue was replaced with trolleybuses in 1955, which is today the SEPTA Route 66 service.

Pennsylvania Route 91
- Location: Marcus Hook–Philadelphia
- Existed: 1927–1930

When the Sproul Road Bill was passed in 1911, the road between Chester and Philadelphia was legislated as part of Legislative Route 180 and as Legislative Route 150 between Philadelphia and Morrisville. With the creation of the U.S. Numbered Highway System in 1926, US 13 was designated through Pennsylvania from the Delaware border in Marcus Hook northeast to US 1/PA 1 at Bridge Street in Morrisville. The route followed Post Road between Marcus Hook and Chester, Chester Pike between Chester and Darby, and Main Street through Darby before it reached Philadelphia. This route effectively replaced part of the Capitol Trail, an auto trail connecting Philadelphia and Atlanta via Washington, D.C. US 13 passed through Philadelphia along Woodland Avenue, Market Street, Broad Street, Diamond Street, Front Street, Kensington Avenue, and Frankford Avenue. The route continued into Bucks County and followed Bristol Pike to Morrisville, where it headed north on Philadelphia Avenue and Pennsylvania Avenue to US 1. In Philadelphia, US 13 ran concurrent with US 1 on Woodland Avenue north of Baltimore Avenue, US 1 and US 30 on Market Street and Broad Street north to Vine and Race streets, and US 1 on Broad Street between Vine Street and Diamond Street. US 13 was originally designated concurrent with PA 91 between the Delaware border and Philadelphia and with PA 32 between Philadelphia and Morrisville, where that route continued north along the Delaware River. In 1928, the concurrent PA 91 and PA 32 designations were removed.

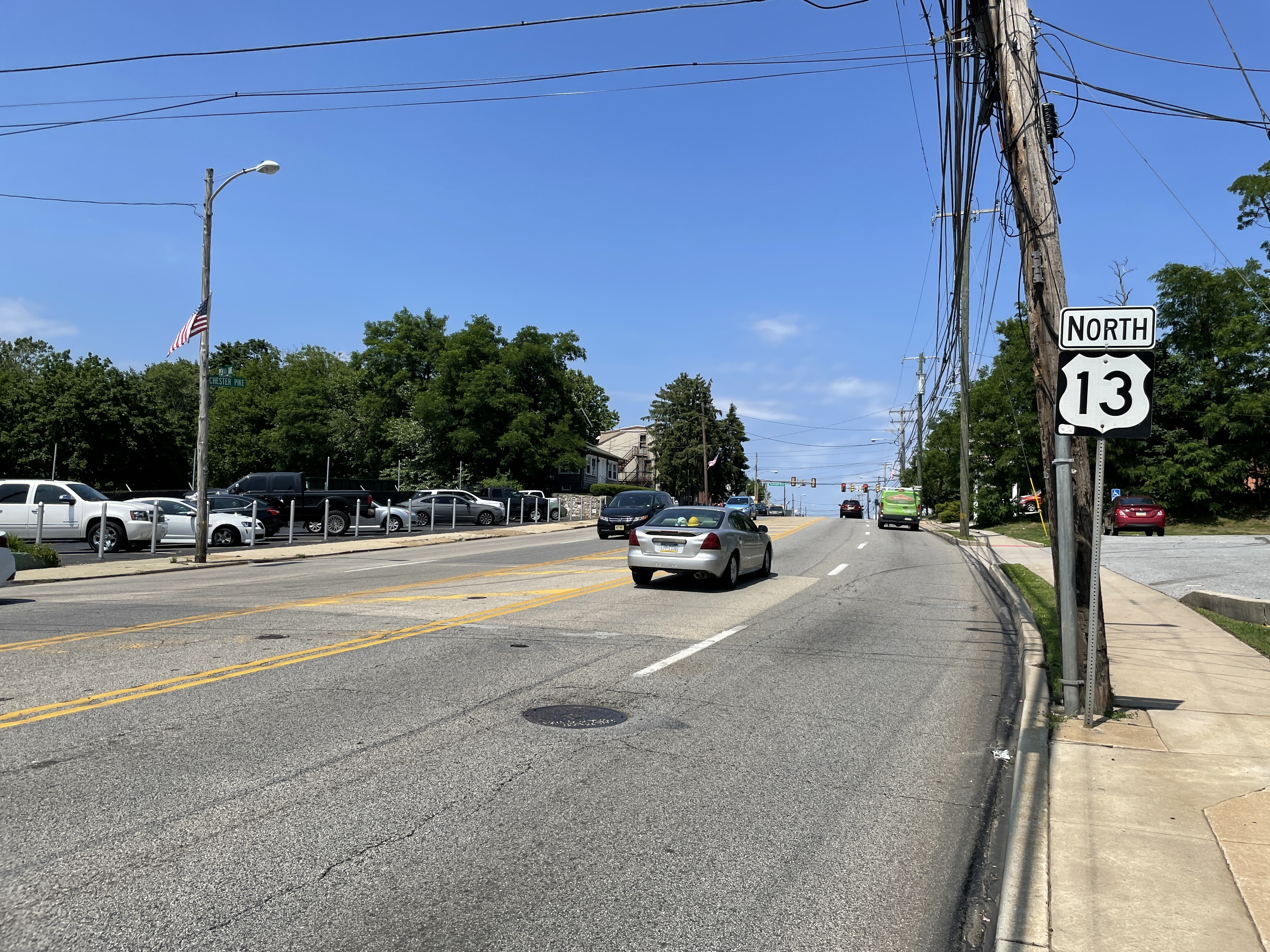
US 13 northbound past PA 420 in Prospect Park

In the 1930s, US 13 was rerouted to a new alignment through Philadelphia. The route followed MacDade Boulevard between Darby and Yeadon, where it entered Philadelphia on Whitby Avenue and continued northeast to an intersection with US 1 (Baltimore Avenue). At this point, US 13 became concurrent with US 1 and the two routes followed Baltimore Avenue, 44th Street, Powelton Avenue, the one-way pair of 31st Street northbound and 32nd Street southbound, and Spring Garden Street to a junction with US 30 at Eakins Oval. The two routes ran east with US 30 on Spring Garden Street before turning north onto Broad Street toward North Philadelphia. US 1 and US 13 followed the Roosevelt Boulevard northeast as a bypass route, running concurrent with US 422 between Tabor Street and Levick Street. At Levick Street, US 13 and US 422 split from US 1 by heading southeast on Levick Street. US 13 split from US 422 by turning northeast onto Frankford Avenue, running concurrent with PA 73 between Levick Street and Cottman Avenue. In addition, a bypass route known as US 13 Bypass (US 13 Byp.) was created, bypassing the central part of Philadelphia to the north and west. By 1950, two bypass routes were designated for US 13 in Delaware County. The first US 13 Byp. bypassed the portion between Marcus Hook and Chester while the second US 13 Byp. served as a bypass of the portion of the route that followed Chester Pike between Chester and Darby.

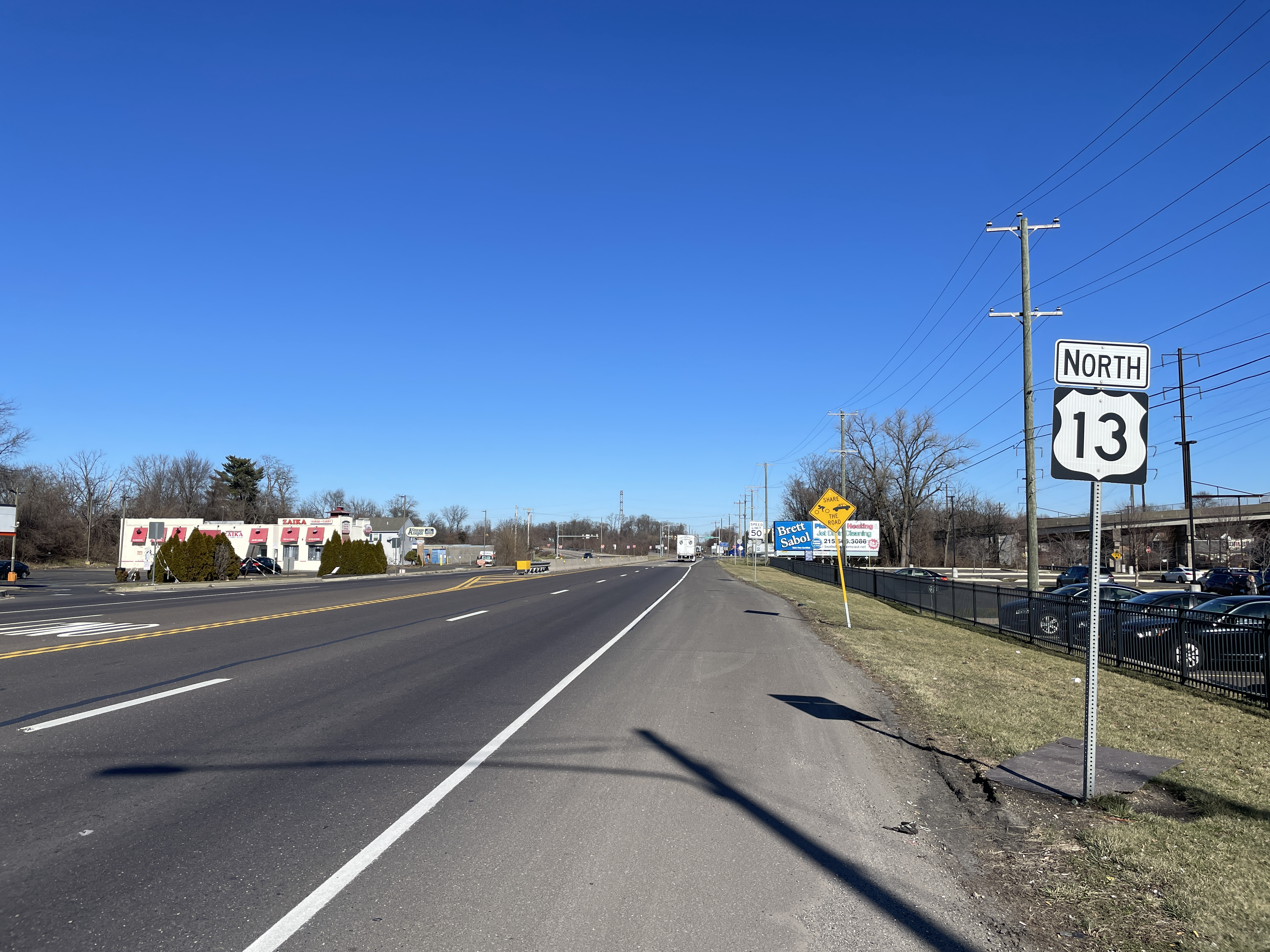
US 13 northbound in Tullytown

US 13 was realigned to a new divided highway alignment of Bristol Pike between PA 413 in Bristol and Tullytown by 1950, having previously followed what is now Old Route 13, Pond Street, Farragut Avenue, Radcliffe Street, Main Street, and Fallsington Avenue between the two boroughs. In 1954, the US 13 freeway was built between Tyburn Road and US 1. A year later, the freeway was completed between Tullytown and Tyburn Road, at which point US 13 was rerouted to follow the freeway to US 1. The US 13 freeway was planned to be incorporated into I-95, which would head northeast from its current routing at PA 413 and continue along the US 13 alignment to US 1, where it would follow that route across the Delaware River on the Trenton–Morrisville Toll Bridge and through Trenton, New Jersey. However, this plan was opposed by New Jersey officials and I-95 was instead routed to bypass Trenton to the north, crossing the Delaware River on the Scudder Falls Bridge. Plans resurfaced for an extension of the US 13 freeway in 1969 that would run from I-95 at the PA 413 interchange northeast to the south end of the current freeway in Tullytown, interchanging with the Pennsylvania Turnpike. This freeway was projected to cost $12.5 million (equivalent to $81.8 million in 2024). This freeway, which would have provided a missing connection between I-95 and the turnpike, was never built because it would have impacted Silver Lake Park.

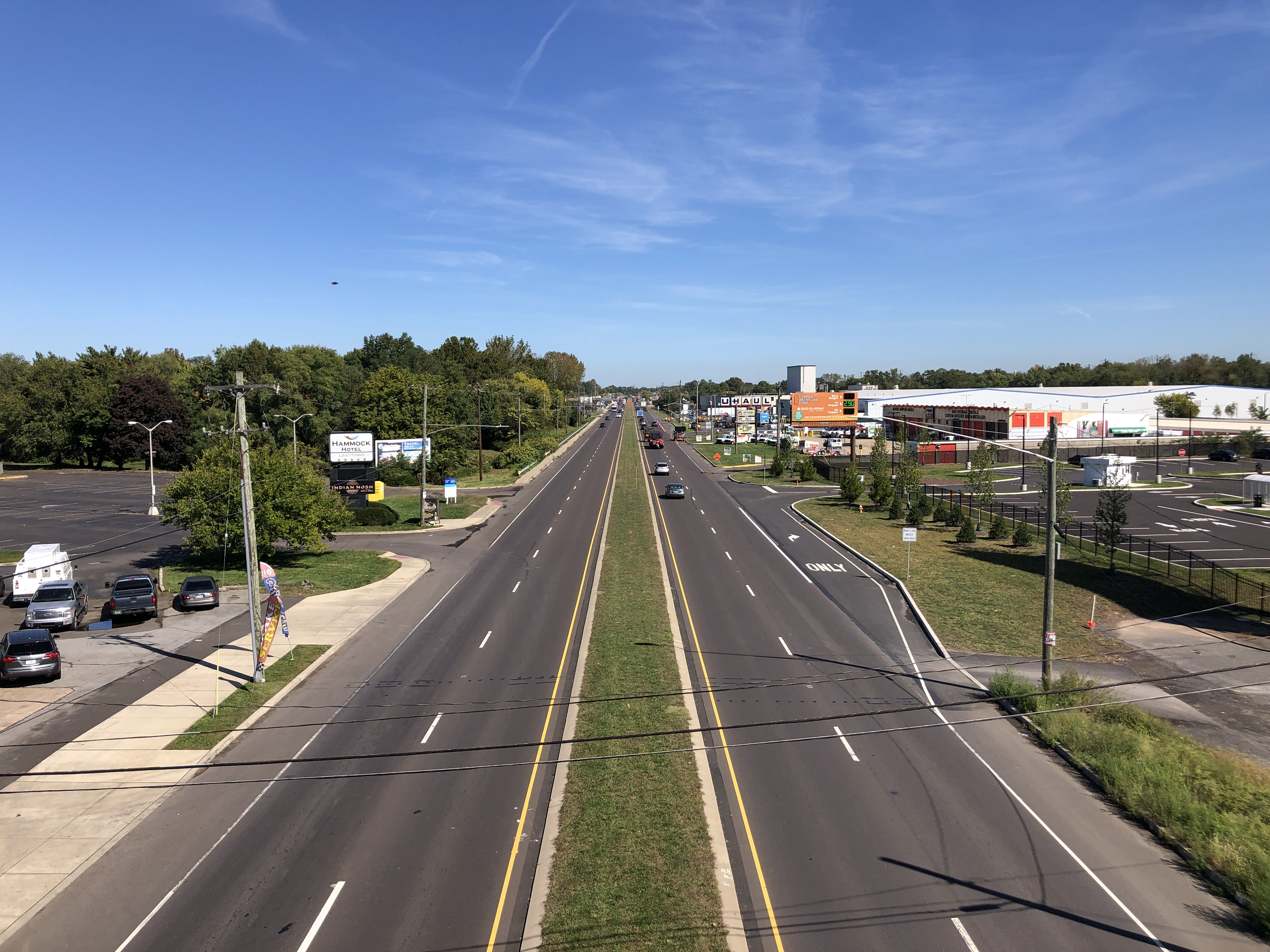
US 13 northbound past the I-95 (Pennsylvania Turnpike) interchange in Bristol Township

In the 1950s, US 13 was shifted in Philadelphia to run along the one-way pair of 43rd Street northbound and 44th Street southbound from Baltimore Avenue, Powelton Avenue, 34th Street, Girard Avenue (where it ran concurrent with US 30), 33rd Street, Ridge Avenue, and Hunting Park Avenue (where it ran concurrent with US 1) to Roosevelt Boulevard. The US 1 concurrency south of Hunting Park Avenue was removed, with US 1 shifted to an alignment further to the west concurrent with US 13 Byp. US 13 was also split into a one-way pair along Robbins and Levick streets. The concurrency with US 1 along Hunting Park Avenue was removed in the 1960s after that route was shifted to the Roosevelt Expressway; the PA 73 concurrency along Frankford Avenue was also removed. US 13 was also rerouted to use Church Lane and Baltimore Avenue between Yeadon and West Philadelphia instead of following MacDade Boulevard and Whitby Avenue. In the 1970s, US 13 was shifted to use 38th Street to travel between Baltimore and Powelton avenues.

In November 2020, the American Association of State Highway and Transportation Officials approved a realignment of US 13 in Chester. US 13 was shifted at Trainer to follow the alignment of PA 291 along the Chester waterfront before following Morton Avenue. The former alignment of US 13 along Post Road, 4th Street, Highland Avenue, and 9th Street received the US 13 Bus. designation. The realignment was proposed to reduce traffic congestion in Chester and raise vertical clearances along US 13 through the city. Sign changes were completed on February 11, 2022.

On January 27, 2025, Philadelphia Mayor Cherelle Parker signed a bill that will allow the Philadelphia Parking Authority to add speed cameras to US 13 in Philadelphia, which will include Baltimore Avenue, Hunting Park Avenue, Roosevelt Boulevard, and Frankford Avenue.

== Major intersections ==
County	Location	mi	km	Destinations	Notes
Delaware	Marcus Hook	0.000	0.000	US 13 south (Philadelphia Pike)	Continuation into Delaware
Delaware	Marcus Hook	1.090	1.754	PA 452 north (Market Street)	Southern terminus of PA 452
Delaware	Trainer	2.179	3.507	US 13 Bus. north (Post Road) – Chester PA 291 begins	Southern terminus of US 13 Bus.; western terminus of PA 291
Delaware	Chester	3.566	5.739	US 322 west to I-95 – Wilmington, Philadelphia	Interchange
Delaware	Chester	5.164	8.311	PA 320 north (Madison Street)	Southern terminus of PA 320
Delaware	Chester	5.331	8.579	PA 291 east (East 4th Street)	Northern end of PA 291 concurrency
Delaware	Chester	5.641	9.078	US 13 Bus. south (East 9th Street)	Northern terminus of US 13 Bus.
Delaware	Prospect Park	8.895	14.315	PA 420 (Lincoln Avenue) – Morton, Essington	
Philadelphia	Philadelphia	18.042	29.036	PA 3 west (Walnut Street)	Southern end of PA 3 west concurrency
Philadelphia	Philadelphia	18.148	29.206	PA 3 east (Chestnut Street)	
Philadelphia	Philadelphia	18.254	29.377	PA 3 (Market Street)	Northern end of PA 3 west concurrency
Philadelphia	Philadelphia	19.978	32.151	I-76 (Schuylkill Expressway) / US 30 (Girard Avenue) – Central Philadelphia, Valley Forge	Brief overlap between US 13 northbound and US 30 westbound; exit 342 on I-76
Philadelphia	Philadelphia			Girard Avenue Bridge over the Schuylkill River	
Philadelphia	Philadelphia	22.023	35.443	Ridge Avenue / Kelly Drive	Interchange
Philadelphia	Philadelphia	24.386	39.245	PA 611 (Broad Street)	No left turns
Philadelphia	Philadelphia	24.684	39.725	US 1 south (Roosevelt Expressway)	Interchange; southern end of US 1 concurrency; southbound exit and northbound entrance
Philadelphia	Philadelphia	28.136	45.281	PA 232 north (Oxford Avenue) / Cheltenham Avenue	Interchange (Oxford Circle); southern terminus of PA 232
Philadelphia	Philadelphia	28.867	46.457	US 1 north (Roosevelt Boulevard)	Northern end of US 1 concurrency
Philadelphia	Philadelphia	30.851	49.650	PA 73 (Cottman Avenue)	
Bucks	Bensalem Township	35.794	57.605	PA 63 (Woodhaven Road) to I-95 – New York, Central Philadelphia	Interchange
Bucks	Bensalem Township	36.059	58.031	PA 513 north (Hulmeville Road)	Southern terminus of PA 513
Bucks	Bensalem Township	37.487	60.329	PA 132 (Street Road) to I-95 – New York, Central Philadelphia	Interchange
Bucks	Bristol	40.975	65.943	PA 413 (Veterans Highway) to I-95 / I-295 east – Penndel, Bristol, Burlington–Bristol Bridge, Burlington	
Bucks	Bristol Township	43.000	69.202	I-95 / Penna Turnpike to I-276 Toll west – Philadelphia, New York	Exit 42 on I-95; former I-276
Bucks	Falls Township	45.388	73.045	Southern end of freeway section	
Bucks	Falls Township	46.446	74.748	Mill Creek Road	
Bucks	Falls Township	47.391	76.268	Penn Valley Road	
Bucks	Falls Township	48.116	77.435	Tyburn Road	Cloverleaf interchange; access to Fairless and Fallsington
Bucks	Falls Township	49.108	79.032	Lower Morrisville Road	
Bucks	Falls Township	49.359	79.436	US 1 – Philadelphia, Morrisville, Trenton	Northern terminus; interchange.
1.000 mi = 1.609 km; 1.000 km = 0.621 mi: Concurrency terminus; Incomplete access

== See also ==
- Special routes of U.S. Route 13

U.S. Route 13
Previous state: Delaware	Pennsylvania	Next state: Terminus
