= Valley Elementary School =

Valley Elementary School may refer to:

- Valley Elementary School, a school in Bensalem Township School District in Bensalem Township, Pennsylvania
- Valley Elementary School, a school in Beavercreek City School District in Beavercreek, Ohio
- Valley Elementary School, a school in Chignecto-Central Regional School Board in Nova Scotia
