= Pennsylvania Route 132 =

State highway in Bucks County, Pennsylvania, US

Pennsylvania Route 132
- Street Road; Armed Forces and Veterans Memorial Highway
- Map of northern suburbs of Philadelphia with PA 132 highlighted in red

Route information
- Maintained by PennDOT
- Length: 15.155 mi (24.390 km)
- Existed: by 1927–present

Major junctions
- West end: PA 611 in Warrington
- PA 263 in Warminster; PA 332 in Warminster; PA 232 in Southampton; PA 532 in Feasterville; US 1 in Bensalem Township; I-276 / Penna Turnpike in Bensalem Township; PA 513 in Bensalem Township; US 13 in Bensalem Township
- East end: I-95 in Bensalem Township

Location
- Country: United States
- State: Pennsylvania
- Counties: Bucks

Highway system
- Pennsylvania State Route System; Interstate; US; State; Scenic; Legislative
← PA 131	→ PA 133

Pennsylvania Route 132 (PA 132) is a state highway in southeast Pennsylvania. The route, which is signed east–west, runs northwest to southeast through Bucks County in suburban Philadelphia from PA 611 in Warrington southeast to Interstate 95 (I-95) in Bensalem. PA 132 is a commercial route lined with shopping centers throughout much of its 15-mile (24 km) length. It is named Street Road for its entire length and is five lanes wide for much of its length. The route was also designated as the Armed Forces and Veterans Memorial Highway in 2005. From west to east, PA 132 intersects PA 263 and PA 332 in Warminster; PA 232 in Southampton; PA 532 in Feasterville; and U.S. Route 1 (US 1), the Pennsylvania Turnpike (I-276), PA 513, and US 13 in Bensalem. Street Road was included in William Penn's survey plans and completed by 1737. The road was paved by 1911 and received the PA 132 designation between US 611 (now PA 611) and US 13 by 1927. The route was widened into a multilane highway and extended east from US 13 to I-95 by 1970. An interchange with the eastbound direction of the Pennsylvania Turnpike opened in 2010.

== Route description ==
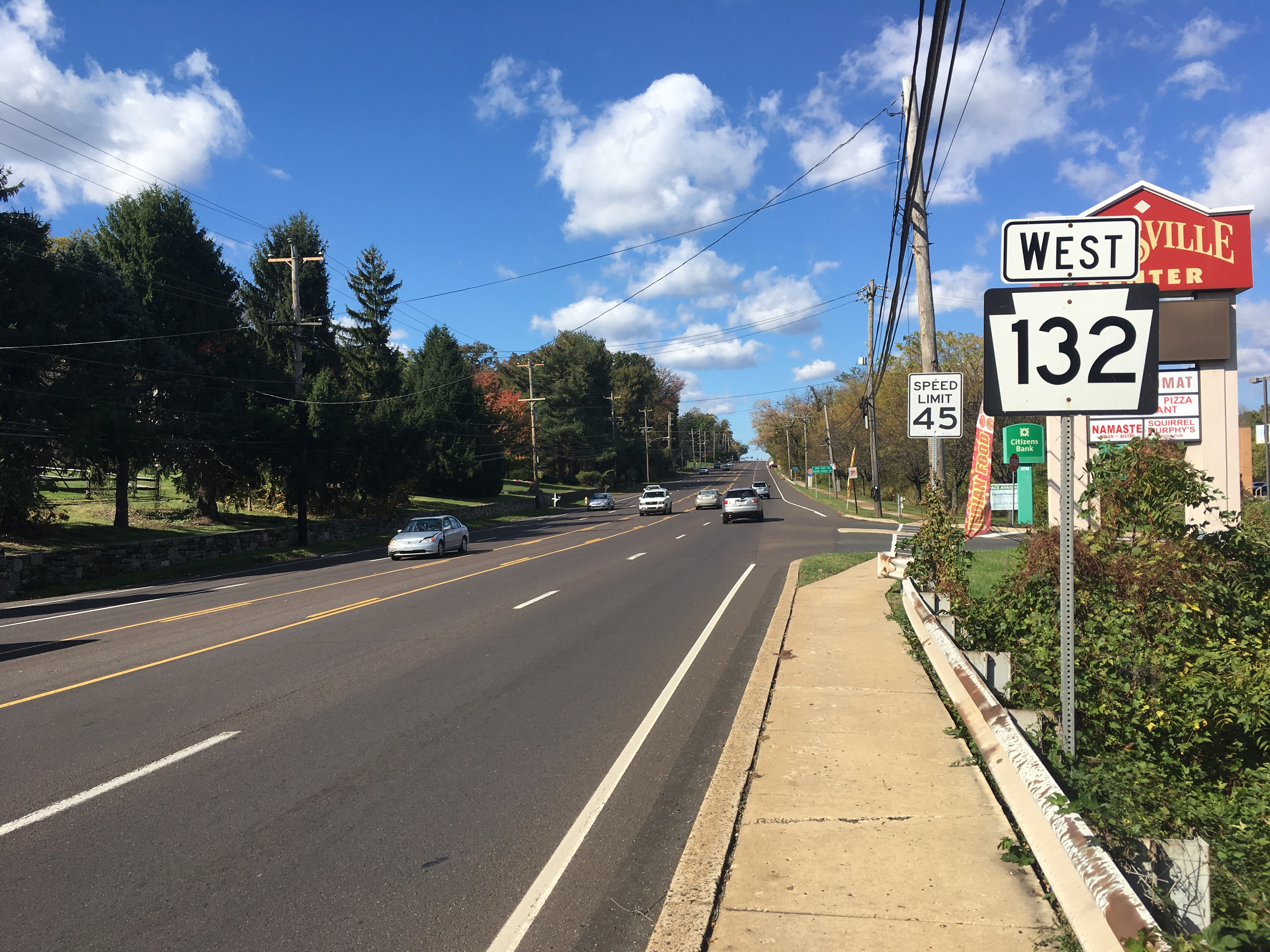
PA 132 westbound past Davisville Road in Warminster Township

PA 132 begins at an intersection with PA 611 (Easton Road) in the community of Neshaminy in Warrington Township, heading to the southeast on Street Road, a roadway that alternates between a four-lane divided highway and an undivided five-lane road including a center left-turn lane. West of PA 611, Street Road continues northwest as State Route 3001 (SR 3001), an unsigned quadrant route, to Lower State Road. From its western terminus, the route heads through commercial areas, passing south of The Shops at Valley Square, before crossing the Little Neshaminy Creek and entering residential areas. At the Valley Road intersection, the road crosses into Warminster Township and continues through suburban development as West Street Road. PA 132 enters commercial areas as it comes to a junction with PA 263 (York Road). Farther southeast, the road intersects Mearns Road. After crossing the New Hope Railroad at-grade about 300 feet (91 m) north of that railroad meeting the terminus of SEPTA's Warminster Line, the route passes through industrial and business areas before intersecting PA 332 (Jacksonville Road).

Past the PA 332 junction, the road continues through a mix of homes and businesses as East Street Road. The route passes northeast of the historic home Craven Hall and the John Fitch Steamboat Museum after intersecting Newtown Road. Upon crossing Davisville Road, PA 132 enters Upper Southampton Township and intersects Maple Avenue as it heads past more businesses as Street Road. The road has a junction with PA 232 (Second Street Pike) in the community of Southampton before passing over the Newtown Rail Trail and reaching an intersection with Churchville Road/Knowles Avenue. After running through wooded residential areas, the road crosses into Lower Southampton Township at the Stump Road junction and passes under Norfolk Southern's Morrisville Line before intersecting Buck Road.

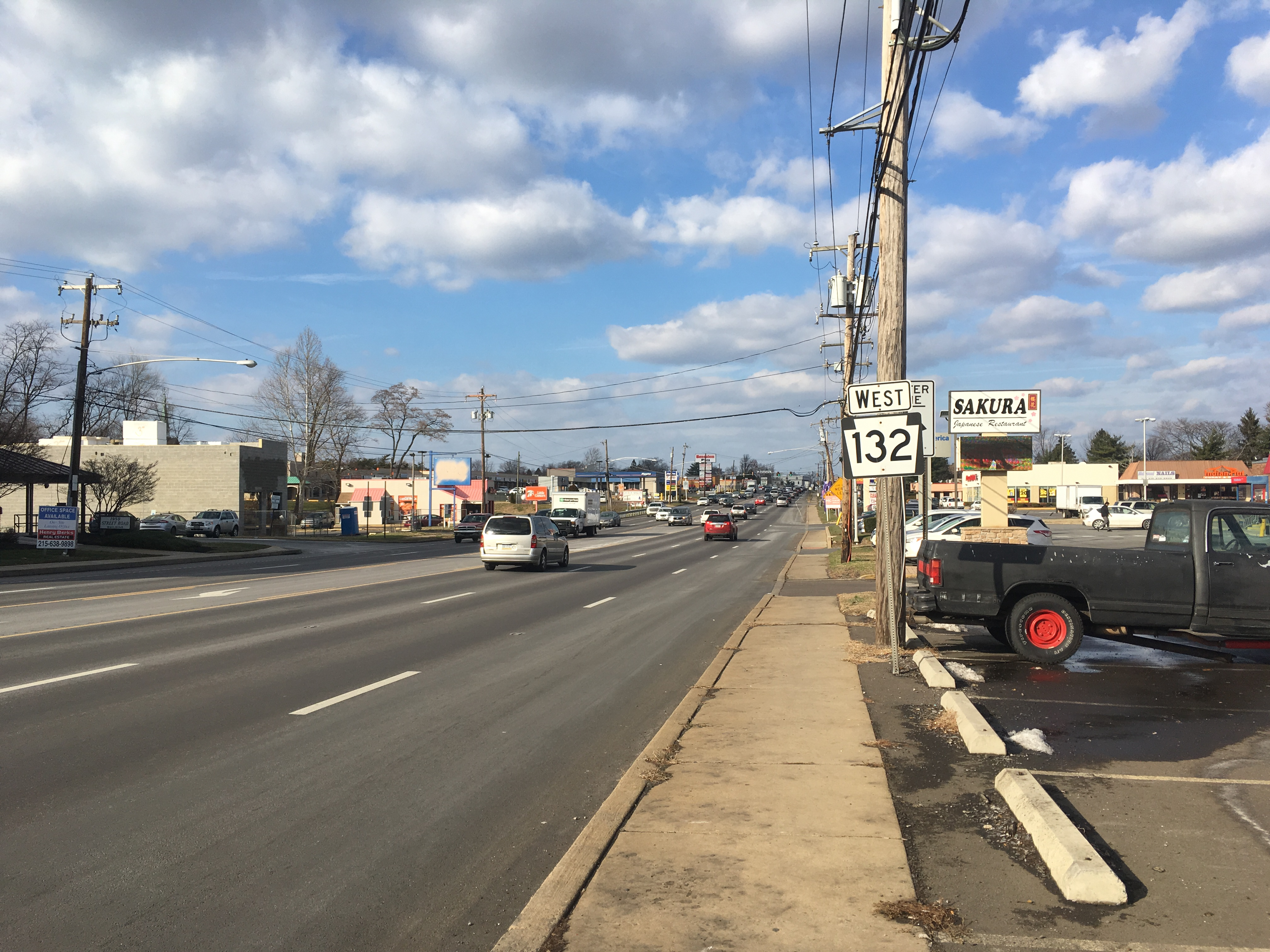
PA 132 westbound past PA 513 in Bensalem Township

Street Road continues past a mix of residential and commercial development as it comes to an intersection with PA 532 (Bustleton Pike) in the community of Feasterville. After the PA 532 junction, the road heads past several businesses before turning south-southeast near more suburban development. PA 132 curves southeast again and crosses Philmont Avenue prior to entering Bensalem Township. Upon entering Bensalem Township, the route passes over SEPTA's West Trenton Line and intersects Trevose Road as it enters commercial areas in the community of Trevose. After a bridge over CSX's Trenton Subdivision railroad line, PA 132 crosses under the Pennsylvania Turnpike (I-276) immediately before an intersection with Old Lincoln Highway, becoming a divided highway.

A short distance later, the road reaches a partial cloverleaf interchange with US 1 (Lincoln Highway) before turning south. After the US 1 interchange, the route comes to a ramp that provides access to and from the eastbound Pennsylvania Turnpike (I-276). PA 132 continues south-southeast past more businesses, becoming an undivided road again past the Richlieu Road intersection and passing two entrances to Parx Casino and Racing to the northeast of the road. The road gains a center left-turn lane and heads past more commercial development, crossing Mechanicsville Road and Knights Road before coming to the PA 513 (Hulmeville Road) intersection. Farther southeast, PA 132 reaches a partial cloverleaf interchange with US 13 (Bristol Pike) before ending at a diamond interchange with I-95 just north of the Eddington station along SEPTA's Trenton Line that follows Amtrak's Northeast Corridor railroad line. Past I-95, Street Road becomes SR 2007, passing over the Northeast Corridor as it continues southeast to State Road near the Delaware River.

In 2016, PA 132 had an annual average daily traffic count ranging from a high of 54,000 vehicles between Trevose Road/Old Street Road and Old Lincoln Highway to a low of 25,000 vehicles between Maple Avenue and Knowles Avenue/Churchville Road. The entire length of PA 132 is part of the National Highway System.

== History ==
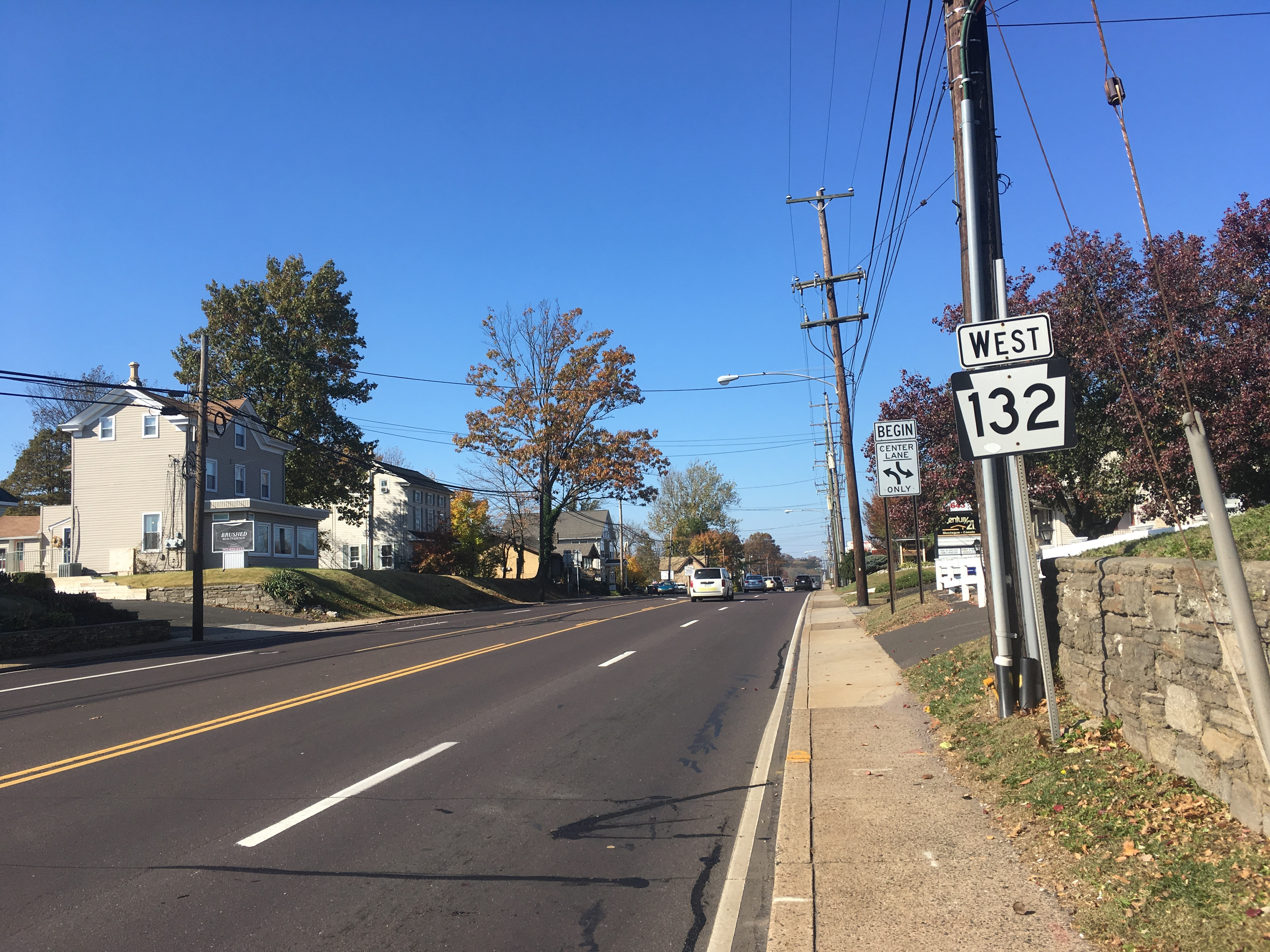
PA 132 westbound past PA 232 in Southampton

Street Road was originally surveyed in the late 17th century, with the road being included in the original survey plans of William Penn for the Province of Pennsylvania. For much of its history it has been known as "the Street road". It was called this because, contrary to present usage where "street" is a synonym for road, the original use of the word "street" was a paved road. The entire length of the road was completed by 1737. Street Road became a paved road by 1911; at the time, the route was not defined as a legislative route. By 1927, PA 132 was designated onto part of Street Road, running from US 611 (now PA 611) in Warrington Township southeast to US 13 in Bensalem Township.

In February 1950, two traffic signals were installed along the road in Bensalem. Street lights were installed along the stretch of PA 132 in Bensalem in December 1952. In August 1956, Bensalem police chief William Riempp urged for the stretch of Street Road through the township to be completely reconstructed as it was one of the most dangerous roads in the state. The state widened the portion of PA 132 through Upper Southampton and Lower Southampton townships from 22 feet (6.7 m) to 24 feet (7.3 m) in 1956; this widening was called a "useless waste of public funds" by the Lower Southampton Township planning commission as the road was not anticipated to handle increasing traffic volumes. The portion of Street Road between US 1 and US 13 in Bensalem Township was repaved in mid-1957; however the shoulders were not repaved, resulting in a drop between the travel lanes and the shoulder. In August 1958, the Pennsylvania Department of Highways (PDH) considered reducing the speed limit on the two-lane stretch of PA 132 between Davisville Road and Gravel Hill Road in Upper Southampton Township in order to make the road safer.

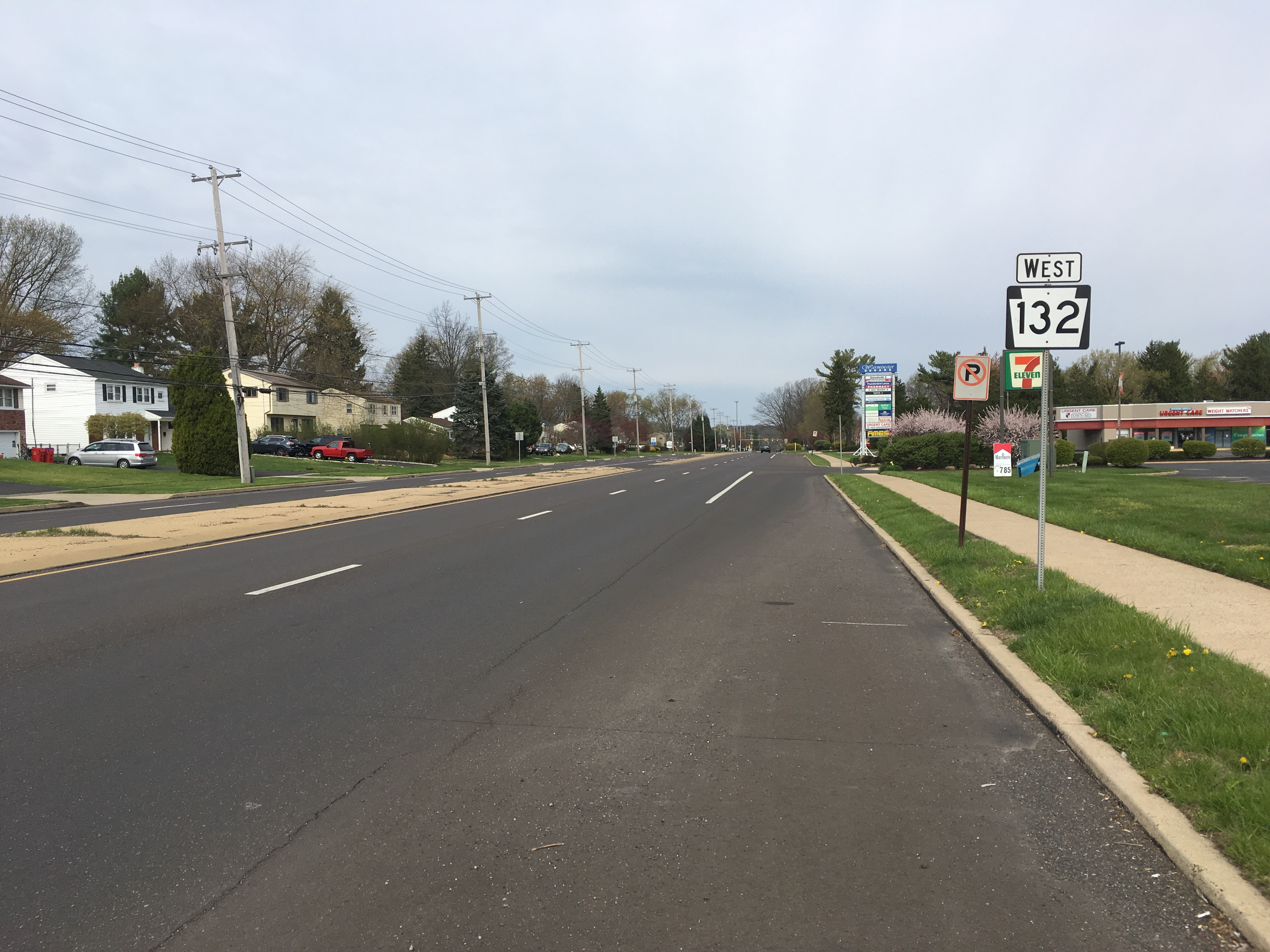
PA 132 westbound in Warminster Township

On January 9, 1960, the PDH awarded a contract worth $1,488,493 to James D. Morrisey, Inc. to upgrade the section of PA 132 between Neshaminy and Warminster to a four-lane divided highway. In November 1961, the portion of Street Road southeast of US 13 was closed to allow for construction of I-95 (Delaware Expressway), which would include an interchange with Street Road; this interchange was planned to be completed in 1962. In January 1962, a proposal was made to split PA 132 onto separate roadways through Feasterville, with the westbound direction using Irving Place a block north of Street Road. In January 1963, plans were made to widen the entire length of PA 132 to 80 feet (24 m) with a median strip, with a portion in Feasterville to be widened to 71 feet (22 m). The widening was originally planned to be completed in 1965. By March of that year, the widening project was shelved as the state felt they should receive federal funds to fund the project. With the widening shelved, businesses from Feasterville and Southampton along with State Senator Marvin Keller led a push to get the portion of Street Road through the two communities paved, which was in disrepair and saw a lot of accidents.

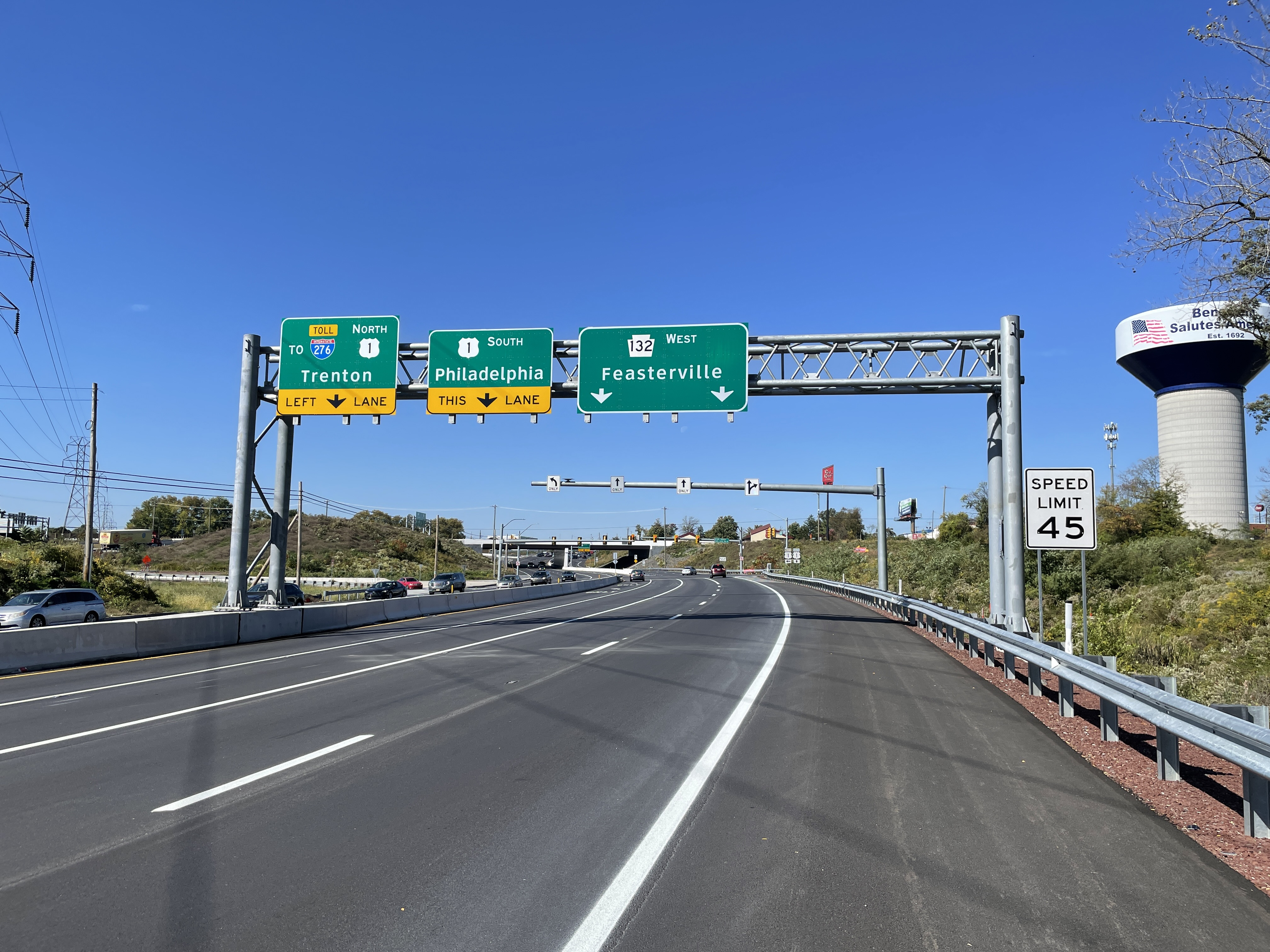
PA 132 westbound approaching interchange with US 1 in Bensalem Township

In May 1965, construction began to widen the portion of PA 132 between US 1 and US 13 in Bensalem to a four-lane divided highway. On August 27, 1965, a 2-mile (3.2 km) stretch of new concrete pavement along PA 132 in Bensalem was completed, with work then to begin on rebuilding the original roadway to make it a divided highway. The widening of Street Road into a divided highway between US 1 and US 13 was completed in December 1965. The proposed widening of PA 132 in Feasterville drew concerns from residents who feared they would lose their homes. In July 1967, the state made plans to add left turn lanes at PA 132's intersections with US 611 in Warrington and PA 263 in Warminster in order to reduce crashes. In 1969, work was underway in widening Street Road between PA 263 and PA 332 in Warminster. The widening of PA 132 into a divided highway was completed in 1970. As a result of this improvement, a portion of the road was relocated east of Feasterville, with the former alignment becoming Old Street Road. Also by this time, the route was extended southeast to an interchange with I-95.

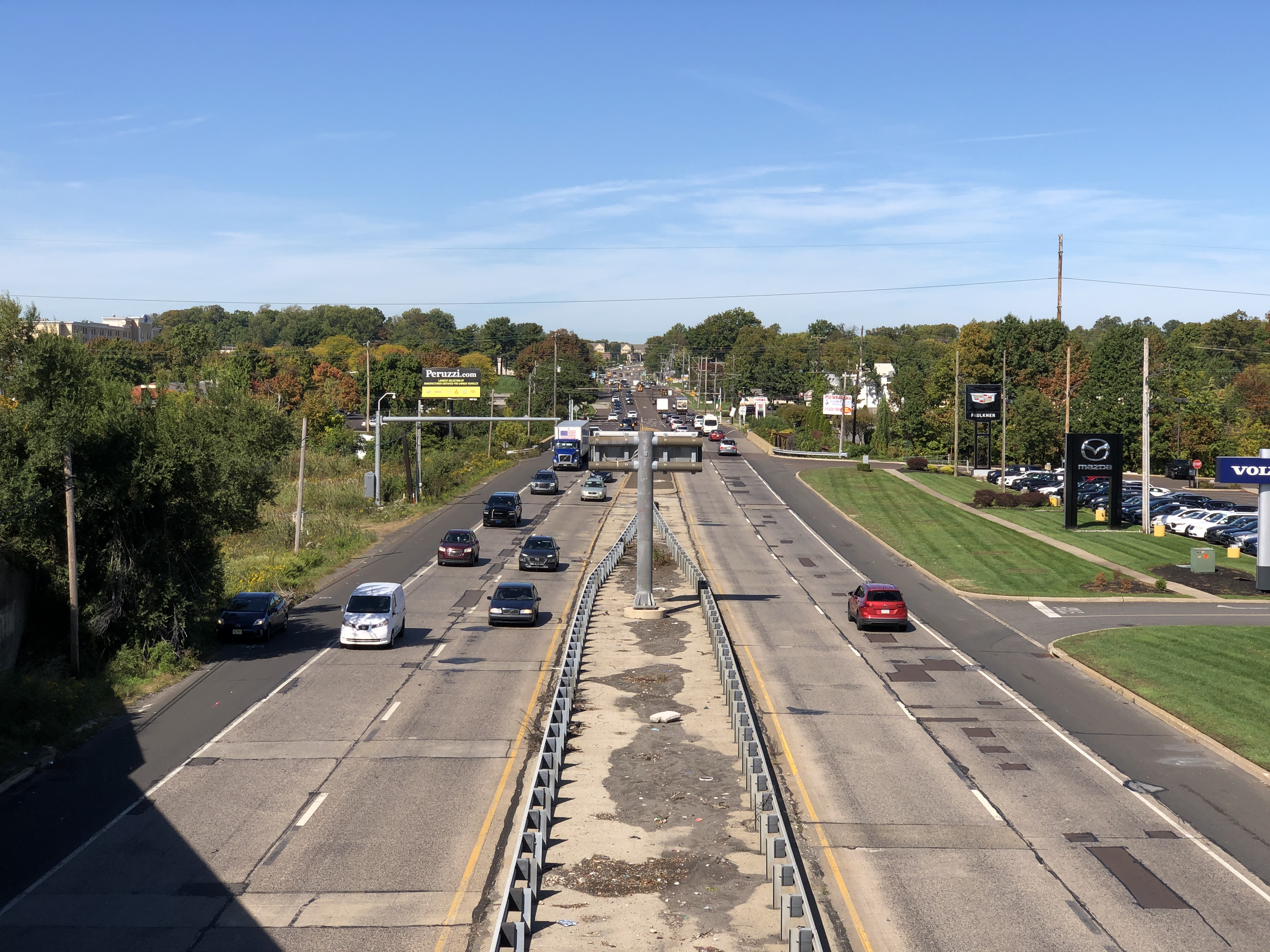
PA 132 westbound in Bensalem Township

In May 1971, plans were announced to install a traffic signal at PA 132 and Mechanicsville Road in Bensalem Township, an intersection that saw many accidents. Plans were discussed in September 1975 to reconstruct PA 132 to handle increasing traffic volumes, with work projected to begin between 1977 and 1980. On November 22, 1976, Warminster Township supervisors voted against building sidewalks and curbs on a portion of Street Road in the township in order to not burden taxpayers.

In 2005, a bill was introduced into the Pennsylvania General Assembly designating the entire length of PA 132 as the Armed Forces and Veterans Memorial Highway; this bill was signed into law by Governor Ed Rendell on October 27, 2006. On May 28, 2007, PA 132 was officially named the Armed Forces and Veterans Memorial Highway in a ceremony held in Warminster, with State Representative Kathy Watson in attendance. On November 22, 2010, a ramp with access to and from the eastbound Pennsylvania Turnpike in Bensalem Township opened, intended to provide improved access to Parx Casino and Racing and reduce congestion at the Pennsylvania Turnpike interchange with US 1. The intersection of PA 132 and Knights Road in Bensalem Township was ranked by Time magazine as the most dangerous intersection in the United States from 2003 until 2012.

In 2018, construction began on rebuilding the interchange with US 1 as part of a reconstruction and widening project along that highway. As part of this project, the US 1 interchange with PA 132 was rebuilt to include traffic signals and turn lanes at the intersections between PA 132 and the ramps, while also adding a ramp from eastbound PA 132 to southbound US 1. In addition, left-turn lanes were also added at the intersection between PA 132 and the ramp to and from the eastbound Pennsylvania Turnpike. Construction was completed in 2022.

== Major intersections ==
The entire route is in Bucks County.

Location	mi	km	Destinations	Notes
Warrington Township	0.000	0.000	PA 611 (Easton Road) – Willow Grove, Doylestown	Western terminus
Warminster Township	2.589	4.167	PA 263 (York Road)	
Warminster Township	3.748	6.032	PA 332 (Jacksonville Road) – Ivyland	
Upper Southampton Township	6.304	10.145	PA 232 (Second Street Pike)	
Lower Southampton Township	9.033	14.537	PA 532 (Bustleton Pike)	
Bensalem Township	11.413	18.367	US 1 to I-276 / Penna Turnpike – Trenton, Philadelphia	Interchange
Bensalem Township	11.753	18.915	I-276 east / Penna Turnpike east – New York City	Exit 352 on 276 / Turnpike; no trucks
Bensalem Township	14.102	22.695	PA 513 (Hulmeville Road) – Penndel, Philadelphia	
Bensalem Township	15.072	24.256	US 13 (Bristol Pike) – Bristol, Philadelphia	Interchange
Bensalem Township	15.155	24.390	I-95 (Delaware Expressway) – New York, Central Philadelphia	Exit 37 on I-95; eastern terminus
1.000 mi = 1.609 km; 1.000 km = 0.621 mi: Electronic toll collection
