= Ralph Tamm =

American football player (born 1966)

No. 65, 62, 71, 64
- Positions: Guard, center, long snapper

Personal information
- Born: March 11, 1966 (age 60); Philadelphia, Pennsylvania, U.S.
- Listed height: 6 ft 4 in (1.93 m)
- Listed weight: 280 lb (127 kg)

Career information
- High school: Bensalem (Bensalem Township, Pennsylvania)
- College: West Chester
- NFL draft: 1988: 9th round, 230th overall pick

Career history
- New York Jets (1988); Washington Redskins (1989); Cleveland Browns (1990–1991); Washington Redskins (1991); Cincinnati Bengals (1991); San Francisco 49ers (1992–1994); Denver Broncos (1995–1996); Kansas City Chiefs (1997–1999)

Awards and highlights
- 2× Super Bowl champion (XXVI, XXIX)

Career NFL statistics
- Games played: 121
- Games started: 31
- Fumble recoveries: 2
- Stats at Pro Football Reference

Ralph Earl Tamm (born March 11, 1966) is an American former professional football player. He was selected by the New York Jets in the ninth round of the 1988 NFL draft.

== Football career ==
Before attending West Chester University, Tamm graduated from Bensalem High School where he played football and competed in track and field.

A 6'4", 280 lb. guard from West Chester University, Tamm played in ten NFL seasons from 1990 to 1999 and was a member of two Super Bowl championship teams: the first from Super Bowl XXVI with the Washington Redskins, the other with the San Francisco 49ers in Super Bowl XXIX. He served as a players' representative on the board of directors for each of the teams for which he played.

== Post-football career ==
Tamm is now an NFL player agent for Golden Peaks Sports and Entertainment where he represents NFL players with respect to their NFL contracts, marketing endeavors and personal appearances. He is also involved in the horse breeding industry, as well as being a part-owner of the Kansas City Brigade of the Arena Football League.
