= Ruth Matlack =

American baseball player

- Pitcher / Pinch hitter
- Born: January 13, 1931; Cromwell Heights, Pennsylvania, U.S.
- Died: August 11, 2017 (aged 86); Langhorne, Pennsylvania, U.S.
- Batted: Left Threw: Left

Teams
- Fort Wayne Daisies (1950)

Ruth Matlack [Sagrati] (January 13, 1931 - August 11, 2017) was an All-American Girls Professional Baseball League player. Listed a 5' 2", 127 lb., she batted and threw left handed.

Ruth Matlack was a more efficient hitter than pitcher during her only season in the league.

Born in Cromwell Heights, Pennsylvania, Matlack grew up learning to play baseball from her father. She started to play organized softball while attending eighth grade. After her graduation from Bensalem High School in 1949, she played for a team based in Norristown, where she read about the league in a newspaper and went to a tryout in Allentown. In 1950, she was invited to spring training in Cape Girardeau, Missouri, and was assigned to the Fort Wayne Daisies as a pitcher.

Matlack was used as a relief pitcher. The left-hander threw a natural curveball and a changeup, but not much of a fastball.

In 14 pitching appearances, Matlack posted a 0–4 record with a 3.54 ERA in 61.0 innings of work. But since she had solid plate discipline and good contact skills, she often was used as a reliable pinch hitter, totaling a .361 average with a .477 OBP and driving in two runs, while scoring three times in 21 games. In the playoffs, she had a single in three at-bats for the second place Daisies.

The AAGPBL shipped Matlack to the Kalamazoo Lassies before the 1951 season, but she was feeling homesick and did not want return to the league.

Following her baseball career, Matlack worked briefly at a restaurant before becoming a factory supervisor in 1952, staying with that organization in various capacities until her retirement in 1985. In the same year, she married John Sagrati.

After retiring, Matlack moved to Quakertown, Pennsylvania, where she golfed, bowled and waterskied.

Matlack is part of the AAGPBL permanent display at the Baseball Hall of Fame and Museum in Cooperstown, New York opened in 1988, which is dedicated to the entire league rather than any individual figure. The same year, she gained induction in the Bensalem High School Hall of Fame.
