= Hitachi Starboard =

The Hitachi Starboard is a line of interactive whiteboard products, interactive LCD panels, and tablet devices aimed at teachers and presenters made by Hitachi. All Starboards come bundled with the Starboard Software which is advertised as being intuitive and completely customizable.

In 2001, it was announced that Avnet Applied Computing would distribute the Hitachi Starboard interactive whiteboard.

The whiteboards are bundled with Evernote software.
