= Bensalem High School =

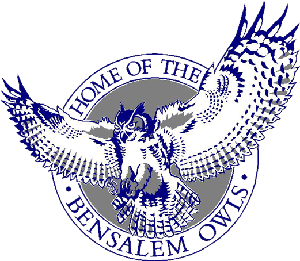

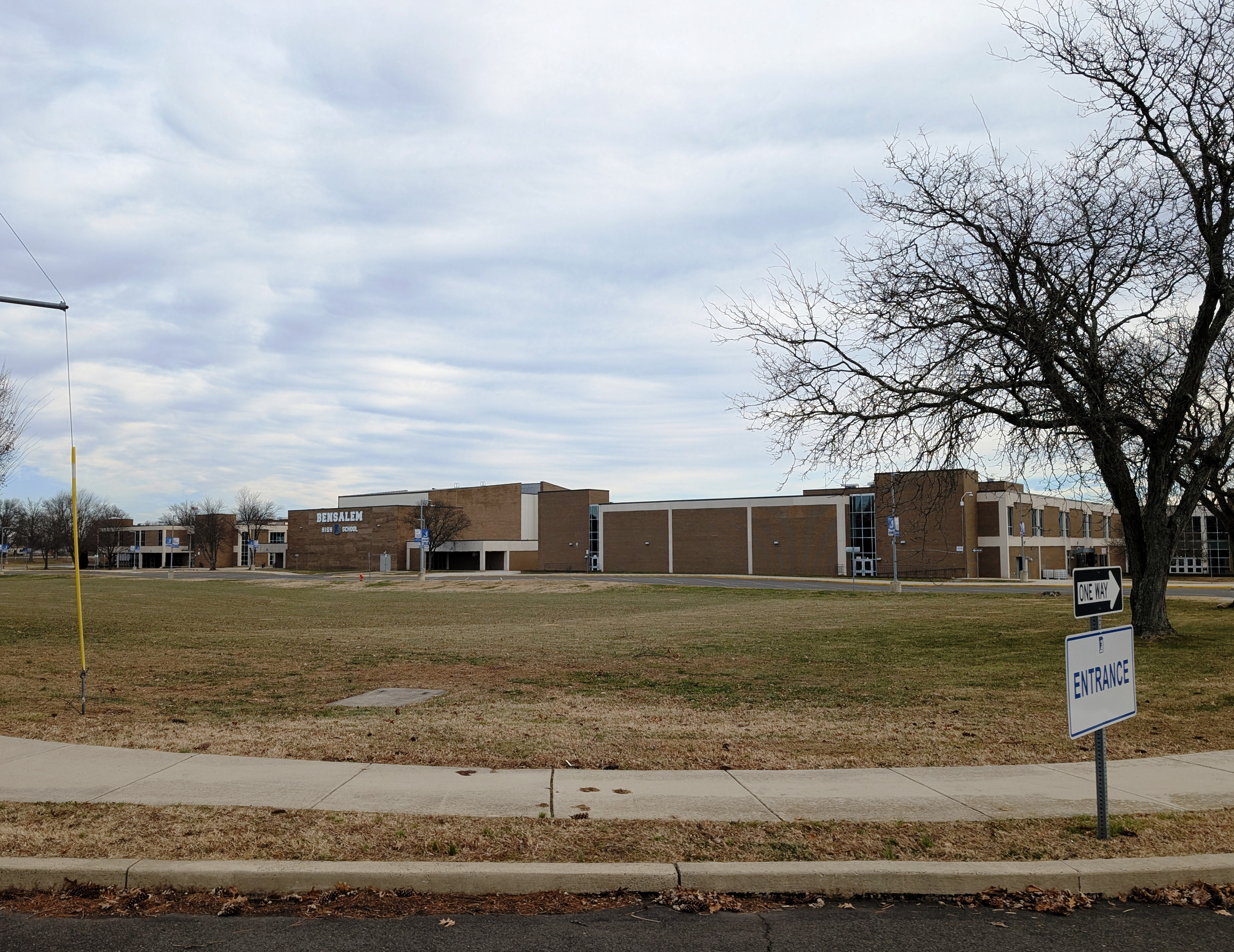

Location
- 4319 Hulmeville Rd. Bensalem, Pennsylvania, United States; 40.1127°N 74.9315°W

Information
- Type: Public high school
- Established: 1920
- School district: Bensalem Township School District
- Principal: Geoffrey Per
- Staff: 167.14 (on an FTE basis)
- Enrollment: 2,116 (2023–2024)
- Student to teacher ratio: 12.66
- Colors: Blue, silver and white
- Team name: Owls
- Website: bensalemsd-bhs.edlioschool.com

Bensalem High School is a public high school in Bensalem, Pennsylvania.

== History ==
=== Original building ===
Planning for the original Bensalem Township High School (Bensalem High School or BHS for short) began in 1920 with the acquisition of land adjoining the school property known as the Cornwells Heights Elementary School, at 2400 Bristol Pike. A. Oscar Martin, registered architect, of Doylestown, Pennsylvania, was selected to design a building along the lines and scope established by the Board of Education. Martin had years of experience in designing school buildings. The architect prepared drawings in 1920, using the existing two-story stone building of two classrooms as a nucleus. He developed a progressive planning system of which one unit was constructed that same year. It consisted of one classroom and one end of the central corridor.

After final installments and improvements, the building was formally dedicated and opened in March 1930. At the time, only 212 had enrolled in the school.

=== Second building ===
During the 1940s Bensalem Township had begun an accelerated rate of growth which produced serious over-crowding in the existing schools. By 1945, it was clear that a new high school building was needed. The board purchased a site of 40.345 acres (163,270 m^{2}) of ground from Minnie Hansell on August 31, 1946, for the sum of $18,000. The first plans for a new high school called for a two-story building to accommodate about six hundred students. These plans were formulated under the leadership of Dr. A. Kurtz King, who succeeded Samuel K. Faust as superintendent of schools. The school board and Dr. King weathered the storm of the rejection of funds from the State School Building Authority and the discarding of plans and drawings by H. F. Everett and Associates of Allentown, Pa., architects, in 1947. Planning started from the very beginning again, this time for a one-story school building to house twice the original school population. It involved Dr. King, succeeding superintendents William B. Shellenberger and Robert K. Shafer, and the school directors, who formed the first municipal authority in Bucks County for the erection of school buildings, with the help of the Township Board of Supervisors.

Contracts for construction of the new high school were placed in March 1953. Groundbreaking ceremonies were on May 5, 1953, and cornerstone laying, on November 9, 1954. Flag raising exercises took place on November 18, 1954. The new high school, located at Street Road and Asbury Avenue, Cornwells Heights, was finally occupied on September 8, 1954, with 975 students in attendance. The cost was $2,685,000. The building contained these instructional facilities: twenty-five general classrooms, five science rooms, three commercial rooms, three homemaking rooms, two industrial arts rooms, four health and physical education rooms, two arts and crafts rooms, two music rooms, seven administrative offices, two faculty rooms, a student activity room, auditorium, cafeteria, and library. Within a few years this building was nearing its peak for pupil capacity. Population growth of the area continued, and by mid-1963, the Board of School Directors was faced with another building problem.

=== Third building ===
Bensalem High was built in two phases over multiple years with the northernmost wing and central portion containing the auditorium known as the "old" building or the "north-end" and the southernmost wing known as the "new" building or "south-end." Not coincidentally, the gymnasium in the older wing is known as "Gym 1" while the gymnasium in the newer wing is "Gym 2." Similarly, the older cafeterias are known as "Cafeteria A" and "Cafeteria B" and the newer "Cafeteria C." The former high school building became the Neil A. Armstrong Middle School.

An arena-style basketball gymnasium was not built at Bensalem High School (it was to be phase 3) until 2011. Until then, the school's varsity boys' basketball team continued to play its home games in the much larger gym at the former BHS, Neil A. Armstrong Middle School nearby. The Bensalem School Board closed Armstrong due to declining enrollment throughout the school district in grades 6 to 8, with students subsequently able to enroll in the district's two other middle schools. Nevertheless, the high school boys' basketball team still uses the Armstrong gym throughout the winter season.

The BHS campus also includes an outdoor football/soccer/track and field arena, Bensalem Township Memorial Stadium. The bowl-style design features a below-grade playing surface and concrete stands on both the home and visitors' sidelines. Underneath the home stand are fully enclosed locker rooms for both the home and visitor teams, with full shower and plumbing facilities, and coaches rooms. The locker rooms can be accessed directly from field level, allowing a constant separation of athletes from spectators throughout any event. In addition, both the home and visitor stands have full concessions facilities along the exterior spectator concourses.

At the time of its erection in the 1970s, the stadium was considered state-of-the art, with the vast majority of schools throughout Pennsylvania still using metal or wooden grandstands. Even today, it is rare for a high school to have locker room and shower facilities within its stadium. Despite its obvious age, Bensalem Township Memorial Stadium is still considered one of the top high school football facilities in the football-rich state of Pennsylvania as evidenced by its selection in 2004 to host the Pennsylvania Interscholastic Athletic Association Class AAAA (large school) Eastern Championship game (also statewide semifinal) between Neshaminy High and Easton Area High School.

Over the years, the stadium has also hosted the Philadelphia region's premiere high school outdoor track and field meet, the District One Championships, on numerous occasions. In the early 1980s, the stadium was the first in Bucks County and one of the first in Pennsylvania to employ a synthetic track. At the time, other large public schools in Lower Bucks County including Neshaminy, William Tennent, Harry S Truman, Pennsbury, and Council Rock all used antiquated cinder tracks. Another asset to the Bensalem Township track facility is its Olympic-style eight-lane width. Because of space limitations and high resurfacing costs, many high schools feature narrower tracks, which do not meet the requirements of true championship-style meets.

=== Renovation ===
Dating back at least to the 1980s, rumors had circulated periodically that the school district was considering erecting a "field house" facility on open land near the student parking lot. During the 2009 summer break, construction of a full sized multi - purpose field house began with its groundbreaking ceremonies taking place sometime in July. The 45,000 square foot, 3 court spectator gym can seat up to 1,700 people and will be used for community events along with Bensalem sports-related activities. The project is being largely funded with $10 million from a 2007 $30 million school district bond. The township, which was looking to build a community center, added $2 million, and another $2 million comes from a state matching grant making the total budget somewhere around $14 million. In December 2011, the Gym was officially dedicated and hosted basketball games shortly thereafter.

In 2013, a $78 million renovation was announced. It included: modern classrooms with StarBoard Software technology, a new performing arts center, a new cafeteria, a new library, an internet cafe, two new softball fields, a new natatorium, a new STEM laboratory area, and a "track" course selection system to increase college readiness. Cafeterias and gyms have also been consolidated.

== Notable alumni ==
- Aaron Jay Kernis, Class of 1977
- Ruth Matlack, Class of 1949 – All-American Girls Professional Baseball League player
- Ralph Tamm, Class of 1984 – Member of two Super Bowl Champion teams (1991 season and 1994 season)
- Ellen Voorhees, Class of 1976 valedictorian, computer scientist
