= Penndel, Pennsylvania =

Borough in Pennsylvania, US

- Borough
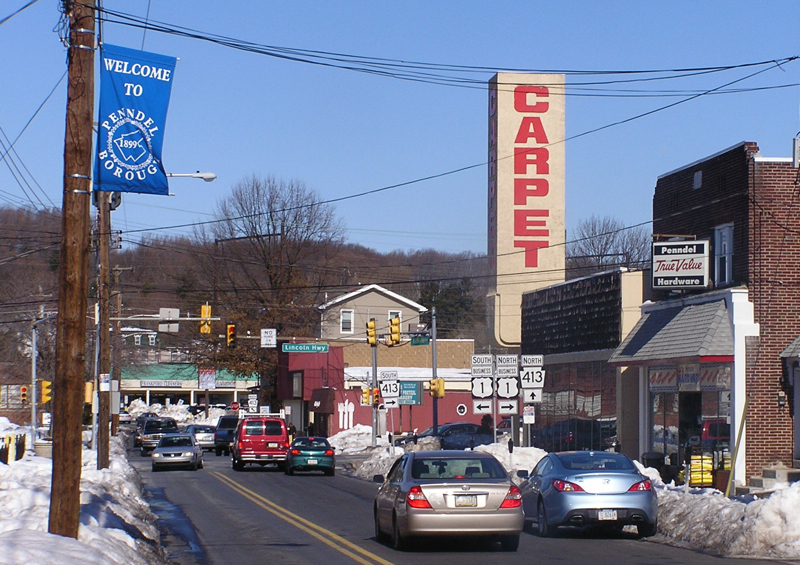
- Downtown Penndel

- Seal

- Location in Bucks County, Pennsylvania

- Location in Pennsylvania Location in the United States
- Coordinates: 40°09′22″N 74°54′51″W
- Country: United States
- State: Pennsylvania
- County: Bucks
- Founded: June 22, 1899

Government
  - Mayor: Tom Sodano

Area
  - Total: 0.42 sq mi (1.08 km^{2})
  - Land: 0.42 sq mi (1.08 km^{2})
  - Water: 0 sq mi (0.00 km^{2})
- Elevation: 105 ft (32 m)

Population (2020)
  - Total: 2,507
  - Density: 6,020.5/sq mi (2,324.52/km^{2})
- Time zone: UTC-5 (Eastern (EST))
  - Summer (DST): UTC-4 (EDT)
- ZIP code: 19047
- Area codes: 215, 267 and 445
- FIPS code: 42-58936
- Website: www.penndelboro.com

Penndel is a borough in Bucks County, Pennsylvania, United States. The population was 2,507 at the 2020 census.

== History ==
Penndel Borough, although small, is rich in history. The area, originally inhabited by the Lenape people, was settled by Thomas Langhorne, an English Quaker preacher, and by Henry Paulin, a Quaker Yeoman, on land grants from William Penn. Penndel remained a farming region until 1876 when the Philadelphia Reading Railroad began service, and the Langhorne train station was established. In 1878 Thomas Eastburn & Co. advertised 130 Building Lots in the area calling it "The Eden of Bucks County." Slowly individual homes and small businesses were built in close proximity to the railroad, and the town expanded from there. It began as the Eden Post Office, was incorporated as the borough of Attleboro on June 22, 1899; the name changed to South Langhorne in February 1911, and finally to Penndel on November 17, 1947. Today Penndel has both a thriving industrial district and residential areas with both new and historically significant homes.

== Geography ==
According to the United States Census Bureau, the borough has a total area of 0.4 square miles (1.0 km^{2}), all land.

=== Climate ===
According to the Köppen climate classification system, Penndel has a Humid subtropical climate (Cfa). Cfa climates are characterized by all months having an average mean temperature > 32.0 °F (0.0 °C), at least four months with an average mean temperature ≥ 50.0 °F (10.0 °C), at least one month with an average mean temperature ≥ 71.6 °F (22.0 °C) and no significant precipitation difference between seasons. Although most summer days are slightly humid in Penndel, episodes of heat and high humidity can occur with heat index values > 108 °F (42 °C). Since 1981, the highest air temperature was 102.8 °F (39.3 °C) on July 22, 2011, and the highest daily average mean dew point was 75.4 °F (24.1 °C) on August 13, 2016. The average wettest month is July, which corresponds with the annual peak in thunderstorm activity. Since 1981, the wettest calendar day was 6.66 inches (169 mm) on August 27, 2011. During the winter months, the average annual extreme minimum air temperature is 1.3 °F (−17.1 °C). Since 1981, the coldest air temperature was −9.7 °F (−23.2 °C) on January 22, 1984. Episodes of extreme cold and wind can occur, with wind chill values < −9 °F (−23 °C). The average annual snowfall (Nov-Apr) is between 24 inches (61 cm) and 30 inches (76 cm). Ice storms and large snowstorms depositing ≥ 12 inches (30 cm) occur once every few years, particularly during nor’easters from December through February.

Climate data for Penndel, Elevation 95 ft (29 m), 1981-2010 normals, extremes 1981-2018
Month	Jan	Feb	Mar	Apr	May	Jun	Jul	Aug	Sep	Oct	Nov	Dec	Year
Record high °F (°C)	71.6 (22.0)	77.9 (25.5)	87.5 (30.8)	94.6 (34.8)	95.5 (35.3)	96.7 (35.9)	102.8 (39.3)	100.5 (38.1)	98.5 (36.9)	88.5 (31.4)	81.2 (27.3)	76.0 (24.4)	102.8 (39.3)
Mean daily maximum °F (°C)	40.4 (4.7)	43.6 (6.4)	51.7 (10.9)	63.7 (17.6)	73.2 (22.9)	82.5 (28.1)	86.7 (30.4)	85.0 (29.4)	78.2 (25.7)	66.9 (19.4)	55.9 (13.3)	44.7 (7.1)	64.5 (18.1)
Daily mean °F (°C)	32.1 (0.1)	34.7 (1.5)	42.0 (5.6)	52.7 (11.5)	62.1 (16.7)	71.7 (22.1)	76.3 (24.6)	74.7 (23.7)	67.6 (19.8)	56.0 (13.3)	46.4 (8.0)	36.6 (2.6)	54.5 (12.5)
Mean daily minimum °F (°C)	23.9 (−4.5)	25.8 (−3.4)	32.3 (0.2)	41.7 (5.4)	50.9 (10.5)	60.8 (16.0)	65.9 (18.8)	64.4 (18.0)	57.0 (13.9)	45.2 (7.3)	36.9 (2.7)	28.4 (−2.0)	44.5 (6.9)
Record low °F (°C)	−9.7 (−23.2)	−2.4 (−19.1)	4.2 (−15.4)	18.1 (−7.7)	33.6 (0.9)	42.4 (5.8)	48.5 (9.2)	43.3 (6.3)	36.5 (2.5)	25.5 (−3.6)	12.6 (−10.8)	0.1 (−17.7)	−9.7 (−23.2)
Average precipitation inches (mm)	3.55 (90)	2.74 (70)	4.21 (107)	3.92 (100)	4.29 (109)	4.29 (109)	5.11 (130)	4.33 (110)	4.29 (109)	3.75 (95)	3.54 (90)	4.00 (102)	48.02 (1,220)
Average relative humidity (%)	65.4	62.2	58.0	57.2	61.7	65.2	65.8	68.4	69.3	68.5	66.9	67.3	64.7
Average dew point °F (°C)	21.8 (−5.7)	23.1 (−4.9)	28.3 (−2.1)	38.0 (3.3)	48.8 (9.3)	59.4 (15.2)	64.0 (17.8)	63.6 (17.6)	57.2 (14.0)	45.8 (7.7)	36.0 (2.2)	26.8 (−2.9)	42.8 (6.0)
Source: PRISM

== Demographics ==
Historical population
Census	Pop.	Note	%±
1900	377		—
1910	514		36.3%
1920	557		8.4%
1930	789		41.7%
1940	921		16.7%
1950	1,100		19.4%
1960	2,158		96.2%
1970	2,686		24.5%
1980	2,703		0.6%
1990	2,703		0.0%
2000	2,420		−10.5%
2010	2,328		−3.8%
2020	2,515		8.0%

As of the 2020 census, the borough had a population of 2,507. The racial composition was 63% White, 22% Black or African American, 2% Asian, 6% Hispanic or Latino, and 6% two or more races.

There were 994 households, out of which 20% had children under the age of 18 living with them. 45% of households were married couples living together, 20% had a female householder, and 13% had a male householder. 11% had someone who was 65 years of age or older. The average household size was 2.40.

The population was distributed with 20% under the age of 18, 69% between ages 18 to 64, and 11% aged 65 or older.

The median income for a household in the borough was $75,000.

== Arts and culture ==
Rumpf Factory/Mill - Originally built and completed in 1898 for Mr. Frederick Rumpf's company Rumpf & Sons to manufacture cotton coverlets, table cloths, napkins and other linen goods. The buildings stone was quarried locally on Mr. Rumpf's farm, formerly the Joyce property, and the sand was hauled from a pit just below neighboring Hulmeville Borough. The original main factory building was three stories high, measured 405 feet in length and 38 feet in width. It was connected by rail with the Philadelphia & Reading Railroad allowing railroad conveyance. George C. Dietrich of Philadelphia secured the building contract for $21,500. The original factory structure was completely destroyed by a fire in August 1901 and rebuilt in 1902. The factory building is still standing, it sits mostly empty and its future is uncertain.

== Education ==
Penndel lies within the Neshaminy School District. Students attend Herbert Hoover Elementary School for grades K-4, Maple Point Middle School for grades 5-8, and Neshaminy High School for grades 9-12. Other schooling opportunities in Penndel are offered through the Roman Catholic parish school of Our Lady of Grace, located in the borough.

== Infrastructure ==
=== Transportation ===
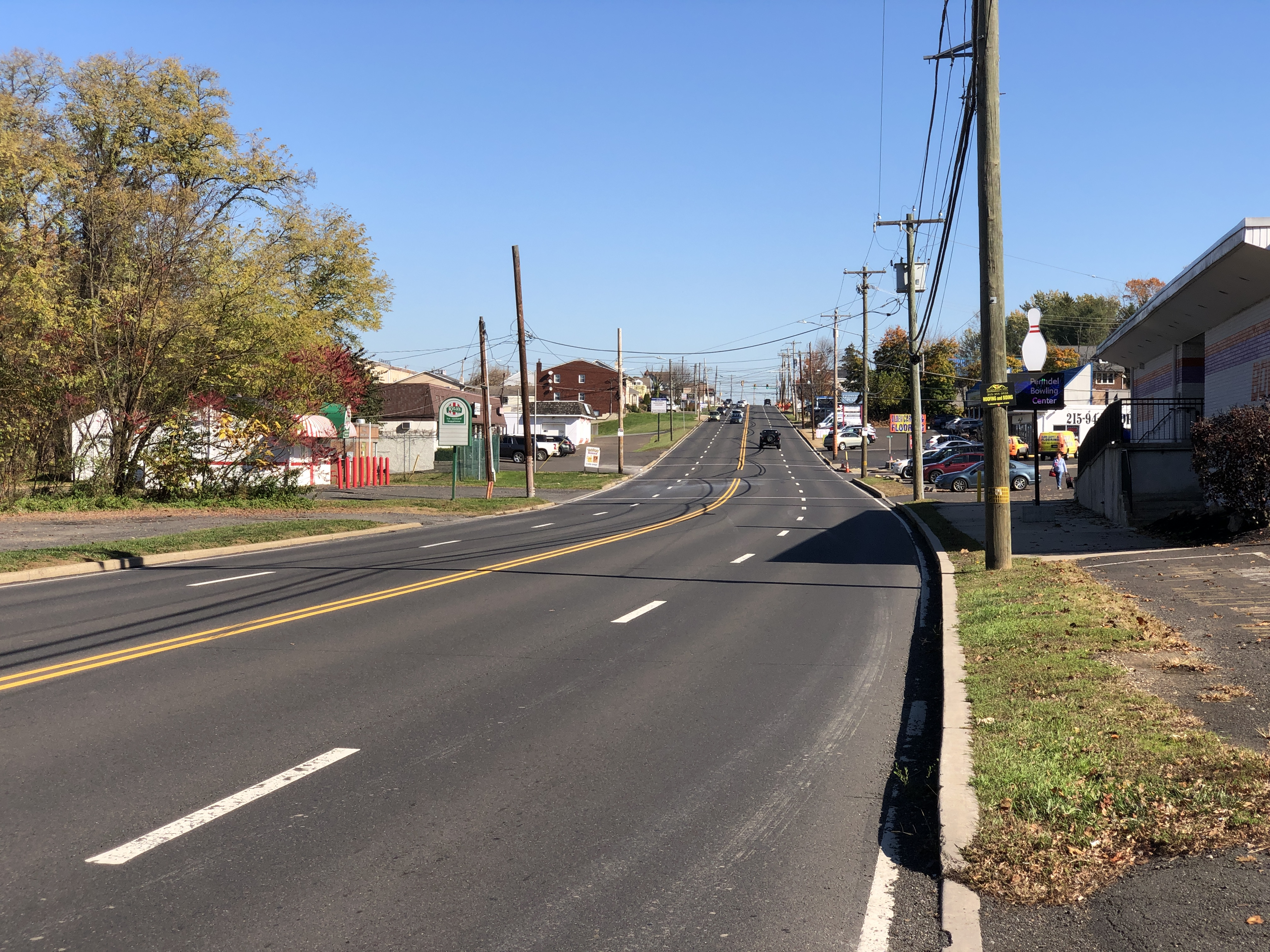
US 1 Business northbound in Penndel

As of 2019 there were 7.83 miles (12.60 km) of public roads in Penndel, of which 2.63 miles (4.23 km) were maintained by the Pennsylvania Department of Transportation (PennDOT) and 5.20 miles (8.37 km) were maintained by the borough.

U.S. Route 1 Business is the most significant highway passing through Penndel. It follows the Lincoln Highway on a northeast-southwest alignment across the northwestern portion of the borough. Pennsylvania Route 413 passes through the northern tip of the borough briefly along Bellevue Avenue and Lincoln Highway, becoming concurrent with US 1 Business. Pennsylvania Route 513 starts at PA 413 and heads southward along Bellevue Avenue to the south end of the borough.

SEPTA provides bus service to Penndel along City Bus Route 14, which runs between the Frankford Transportation Center in Northeast Philadelphia and the Oxford Valley Mall, Suburban Bus Route 129, which runs between Frankford Avenue and Knights Road in Northeast Philadelphia and the Oxford Valley Mall, and Suburban Bus Route 130, which runs between Frankford Avenue and Knights Road in Northeast Philadelphia and Bucks County Community College in Newtown.Langhorne station, a nearby SEPTA Regional Rail stop in Langhorne Manor, serves the West Trenton Line.
