= Bensalem Township School District =

School district in Pennsylvania

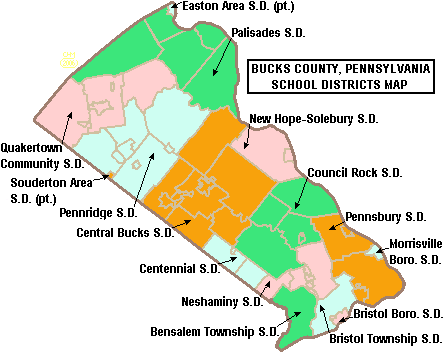

Address
- 3000 Donallen Drive Bensalem, Pennsylvania, 19020; United States

District information
- Type: Public

Students and staff
- Enrollment: 6277 (December 2020)
- Faculty: 1270 staff members (full and part-time)
- District mascot: Owls

Other information
- Website: https://www.bensalemsd.org/

The Bensalem Township School District covers Bensalem Township in Bucks County, Pennsylvania.

The school district covers approximately 21 square miles (54 km^{2}) and enrolls 6,277 students as of December 2020.

Within the district are six elementary schools, two middle schools, and one high school. The oldest school in the district is Bensalem High School, which was established in 1923, and Cornwells Elementary School is the newest, established in 1998. Grounds for Cornwells were acquired in six parts, the oldest dating back to 1822.

== Elementary schools ==
- Belmont Hills Elementary School, est. 1970
- Cornwells Elementary School, est. 1998
- Samuel K. Faust Elementary School, est. 1956
- Benjamin Rush Elementary School, est. 1964
- Russell C. Struble Elementary School, est. 1975
- Valley Elementary School, est. 1975

== Middle schools ==
- Robert K. Shafer Middle School, est. 1980
- Cecelia Snyder Middle School, est. 1958

== High school ==
- Bensalem High School, est. 1923

== Charter school ==
In 1998, the Bensalem Township School Board approved the charter school application for School Lane Charter School. The school opened up on the site of the Old Cornwells Elementary School located in the Eddington section of Bensalem. The school now serves grades K-12 after its recent expansion and celebrated its 20th anniversary in 2018.
