= Pennsylvania Route 413 =

State highway in Bucks County, Pennsylvania, United States

Pennsylvania Route 413

Route information
- Maintained by PennDOT
- Length: 31.059 mi (49.985 km)

Major junctions
- South end: Route 413 at the New Jersey state line in Maple Beach
- US 13 in Bristol Township; I-95 in Bristol Township; US 1 Bus. in Middletown Township; I-295 in Middletown Township; PA 213 in Langhorne; PA 332 / PA 532 in Newtown; PA 232 in Wrightstown Township; PA 263 in Buckingham Township; US 202 in Buckingham Township
- North end: PA 611 in Bedminster Township

Location
- Country: United States
- State: Pennsylvania
- Counties: Bucks

Highway system
- Pennsylvania State Route System; Interstate; US; State; Scenic; Legislative
| ← PA 412 | → PA 414 |
| ← PA 100 | PA 101 | → PA 102 |

Pennsylvania Route 413 (PA 413) is a 31-mile-long (50 km), north–south state highway in Bucks County, Pennsylvania. The route runs from the New Jersey state line on the Burlington–Bristol Bridge over the Delaware River outside Bristol, where the road continues as Route 413 into New Jersey, north to PA 611 in Bedminster Township. The route passes through the lower and central portions of Bucks County, serving Bristol, Levittown, Langhorne, Newtown, and Buckingham. The route intersects U.S. Route 13 (US 13) and Interstate 95 (I-95) near Bristol, I-295 near Penndel, US 1 in Langhorne Manor, and US 202 in Buckingham.

The modern-day alignment of PA 413 roughly follows the Durham Road, an 18th-century road that connected Bristol to upper Bucks County. PA 413 was originally designated in 1928 to run from US 309 (Main Street) in Sellersville east to PA 113 in Blooming Glen. The route was extended to US 122 (now US 202) in Buckingham by 1930. In 1946, the northern terminus was moved to US 611 in Pipersville, with portions of the route between Sellersville and Pipersville becoming parts of PA 113 and PA 152. The route was also extended south to US 13 in Bristol by this time, replacing PA 101 between Bristol and Penndel and PA 113 between Penndel and Buckingham. The route was extended south to its current terminus and moved to its current alignment between Bristol and Penndel by 1950. In 1977, PA 413 was rerouted to bypass Newtown.

== Route description ==
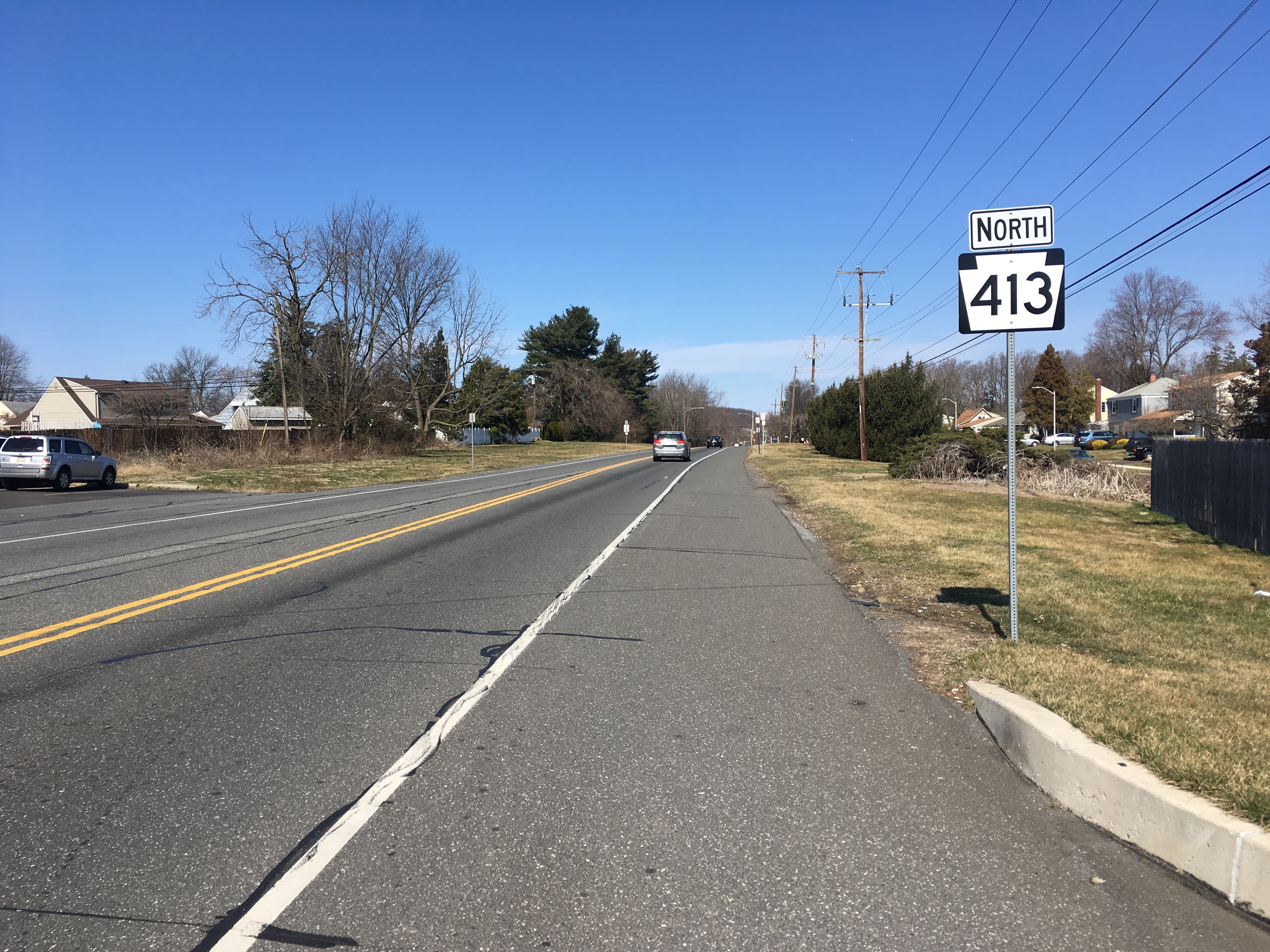
PA 413 northbound past Trenton Road in Middletown Township

PA 413 begins at the Burlington–Bristol Bridge, a vertical-lift bridge over the Delaware River, in Bristol Township, Bucks County, where the road continues south into the city of Burlington, New Jersey, as Route 413. From the bridge, PA 413 heads north as two-lane undivided Veterans Highway, passing over the abandoned Maple Beach community before curving northwest and back north through woodland. The route heads into industrial areas and widens into a four-lane road, bending northeast and crossing Conrail Shared Assets Operations' Bristol Industrial Track at-grade. PA 413 turns northwest at an intersection with Otter Street and passes under Amtrak's Northeast Corridor railroad line before it reaches a junction with US 13. Past this intersection, the road becomes a four-lane divided highway and passes between homes to the west and a shopping center to the east, at which point it forms the border between Bristol Township to the west and the borough of Bristol to the east. The route fully enters Bristol Township again and continues through residential areas with a few businesses as a five-lane road with a center left-turn lane, passing to the west of the Lower Bucks Campus of Bucks County Community College. PA 413 becomes a six-lane divided highway as it comes to a ramp that provides access to I-95 to the west.

Following this, the route reverts to a five-lane road with a center left-turn lane and runs through commercial areas. PA 413 becomes a four-lane divided highway before it passes under the Pennsylvania Turnpike (I-95) and narrows into a two-lane undivided road. The road gains a center left-turn lane and passes businesses as it forms the western border of the planned residential community of Levittown. At the New Falls Road intersection, the route enters Middletown Township and runs between apartment complexes to the west and woods to the east as a two-lane road. The road heads through residential areas with occasional businesses along the western edge of Levittown, crossing Trenton Road and Mill Creek as it continues north to an intersection with US 1 Bus.

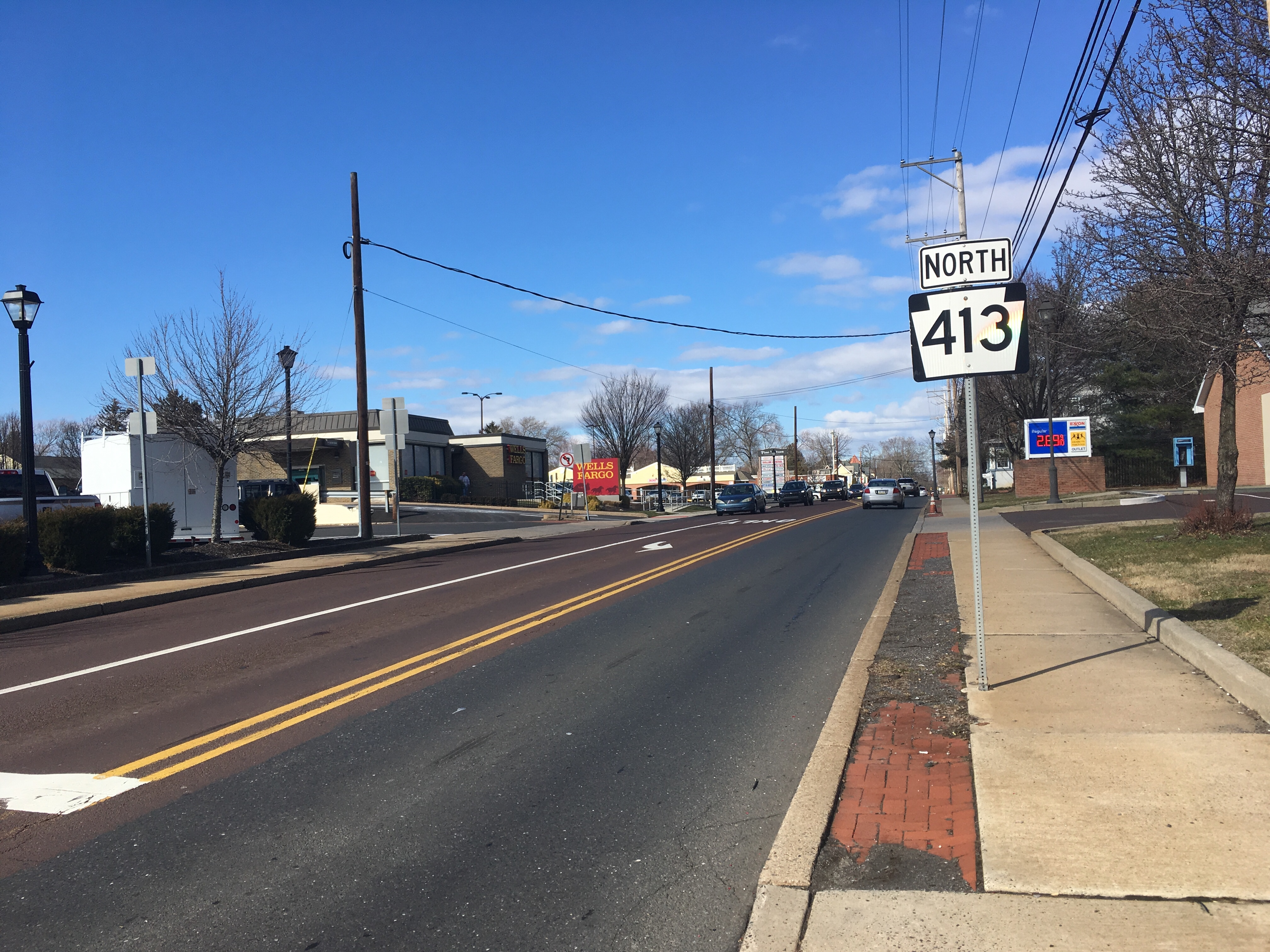
PA 413 northbound past PA 213 in Langhorne

At this point, PA 413 turns southwest to form a concurrency with US 1 Bus. on four-lane divided Lincoln Highway, immediately reaching a diamond interchange with I-295. Past this interchange, the roadway crosses Mill Creek again and continues as a four-lane undivided road, passing through commercial areas and crossing into the borough of Penndel. In Penndel, PA 413 splits from US 1 Bus. by turning northwest onto two-lane undivided Durham Road. A block later, the route intersects the northern terminus of PA 513 and heads north on Bellevue Avenue. The road crosses CSX's Trenton Subdivision railroad line and SEPTA's West Trenton Line at-grade east of the Langhorne station serving the SEPTA line and enters the borough of Langhorne Manor. Here, PA 413 runs north-northwest through wooded residential areas. The route turns east onto four-lane undivided South Pine Street, with South Bellevue Avenue continuing north to provide access to and from the northbound lanes of the US 1 freeway to PA 413. PA 413 curves north, crossing back into Middletown Township, and comes to a bridge over US 1 before it intersects East Gillam Avenue, which along with connecting South Bellevue Avenue provides access to and from the southbound lanes of US 1 to PA 413.

Following this intersection, the road enters the borough of Langhorne, narrowing back into a two-lane undivided road and heading into residential areas. The route crosses PA 213 in the center of Langhorne and becomes North Pine Street, passing near some businesses before heading past more homes. PA 413 crosses back into Middletown Township, where the name changes to Newtown Langhorne Road, and passes under Norfolk Southern's Morrisville Line and an abandoned railroad line before heading into wooded areas along the eastern bank of the Neshaminy Creek and curving northwest. The road curves back to the north away from the creek and passes by residential subdivisions a short distance to the west of Core Creek Park. The route heads to the west of St. Mary Medical Center before running past more homes. PA 413 passes between the George School to the west and farm fields and neighborhoods to the east before it comes to the PA 332 intersection.

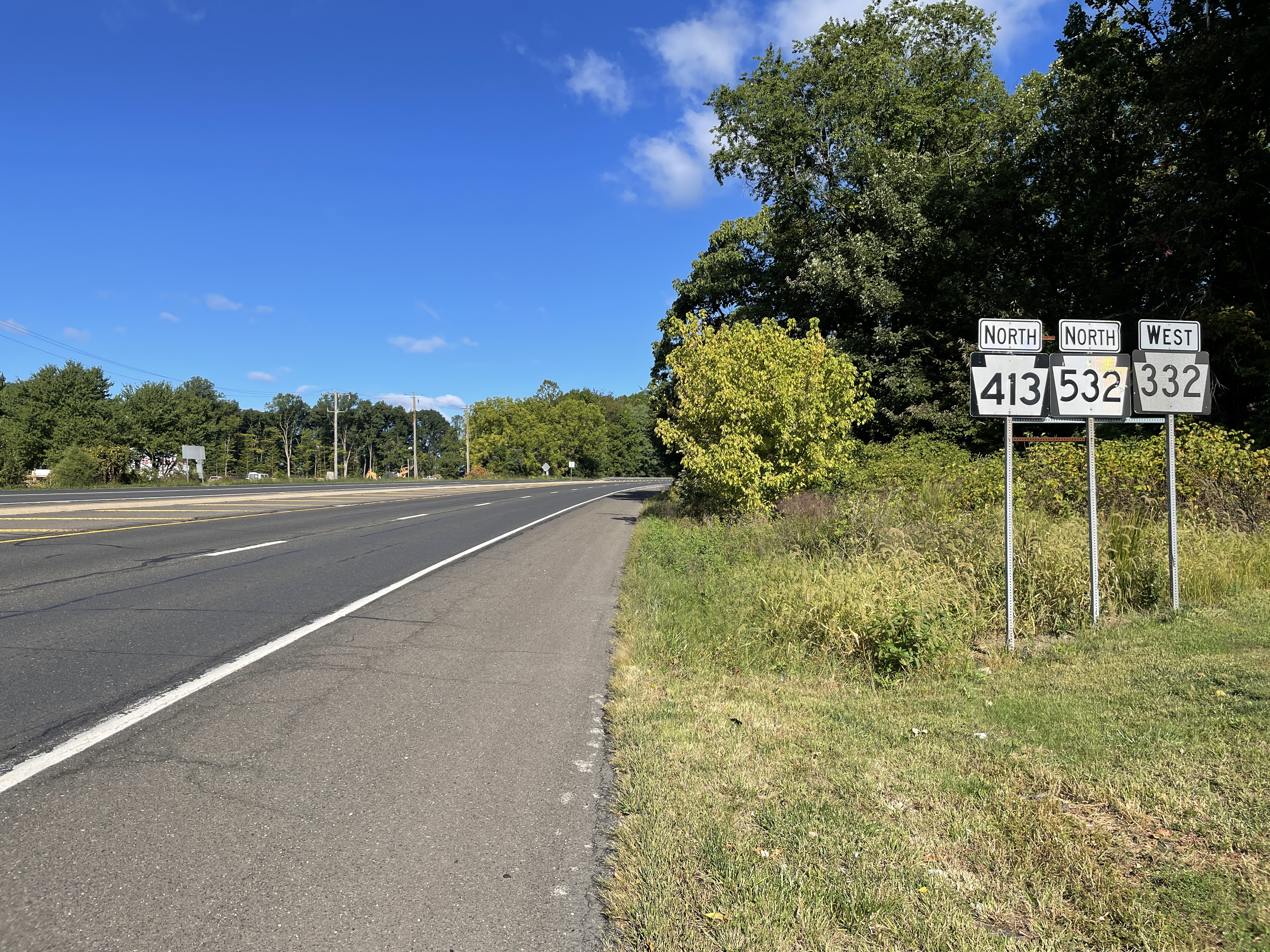
PA 413 northbound along with PA 332 westbound and PA 532 northbound on the Newtown Bypass

Here, PA 413 turns west to join PA 332 on the four-lane divided Newtown Bypass, with State Street continuing north into the borough of Newtown. The bypass heads through wooded areas in Newtown Township and comes to a bridge over the abandoned Fox Chase/Newtown railroad line and Freedom Drive before passing over Newtown Creek. The road curves northwest and intersects PA 532, at which point PA 532 joins PA 332/PA 413 on the Newtown Bypass. The highway turns north and passes through wooded areas with nearby residential development. PA 332 splits from the Newtown Bypass by heading west on Richboro Road while PA 413/PA 532 continue to the north on the bypass. The roadway passes over an access road to Council Rock High School North before it heads to the east of Tyler State Park, curving to the northwest. At the entrance to the park, PA 413/PA 532 turn northeast to remain on the Newtown Bypass while Swamp Road heads to the northwest. The road passes between a residential development to the northwest and a shopping center to the southeast before the Newtown Bypass ends at an intersection with Durham Road, at which point PA 413 heads north on Durham Road and PA 532 heads east on Durham Road.

From this point, PA 413 continues northwest as a two-lane undivided road, passing residential subdivisions before continuing into a mix of farmland and woodland with some homes. The road heads to the southwest of the residential development of Newtown Grant before it crosses into Wrightstown Township, where it passes through the community of Wrightstown. The route runs through more rural areas with some development, crossing PA 232 in the community of Penns Park.

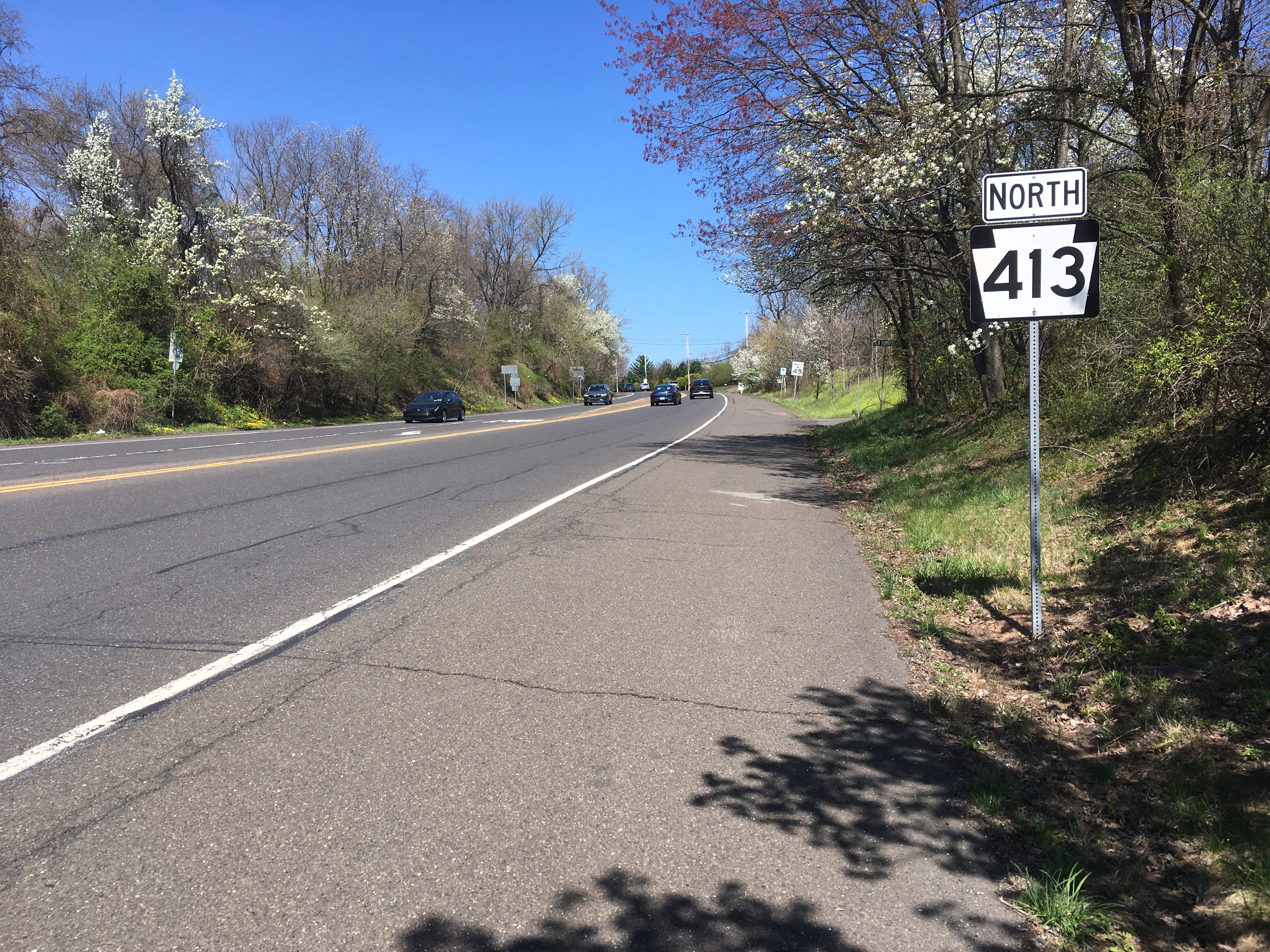
PA 413 northbound past PA 532 near Newtown

Past this intersection, PA 413 continues through more farm fields, woods, and housing areas, crossing into Buckingham Township at the Township Line Road/Pineville Road intersection in the community of Pineville. The road continues northwest through agricultural and wooded areas, passing to the north of the residential community of Buckingham Springs. The route passes through forested areas with some development and runs a short distance to the east of the New Hope Railroad, curving north and crossing the railroad line at-grade. PA 413 heads to the northwest again through farmland and crosses Lahaska Creek before it comes to an intersection with PA 263 (York Road) in the community of Buckingham. The route becomes a divided highway at this point and crosses US 202 a short distance later.

Past US 202, PA 413 becomes a two-lane undivided road again, continuing northwest through wooded areas with some fields and homes. The road passes through the community of Mechanicsville and runs through more rural areas with some suburban residential subdivisions. The route heads into Plumstead Township after the intersection with Landisville Road and Ridgeview Drive and continues to the community of Gardenville, where it crosses Point Pleasant Pike.

From here, PA 413 continues north into more rural surroundings, passing through farmland with some patches of woods, crossing the North Branch Neshaminy Creek and Geddes Run before passing through the community of Hinkletown. The road curves to the northwest and becomes the border between Bedminster Township to the west and Plumstead Township to the east before fully entering Bedminster Township. The route passes through more rural areas, crossing Cabin Run, before it comes to the community of Pipersville. Here, PA 413 turns southwest onto Old Easton Road, at which point it follows State Route 1013 (SR 1013), an unsigned quadrant route. A short distance later, the route turns west onto Deep Run Road and reaches its northern terminus at an intersection with PA 611. Deep Run Road continues southwest from here as part of SR 1013.

== History ==
Pennsylvania Route 101
- Location: Bristol – South Langhorne
- Existed: 1927–1946

The precursor to present-day PA 413 was Durham Road, a road built in the 18th century that linked Bristol with upper Bucks County. Durham Road was extended from Bristol to close to the Delaware River near Durham Furnace in the early 1720s. The road was later extended to the Lehigh River past Durham. The Durham Road split into several branches in upper Bucks County, connecting to Bethlehem and Easton. When Pennsylvania first legislated routes in 1911, the Durham Road was legislated as Legislative Route 152 between Bristol and Buckingham. In addition, what would become PA 413 was legislated as Legislative Route 154 between Sellersville and Blooming Glen. PA 101 was designated along Durham Road between US 13 in Bristol and US 1 and PA 113 in South Langhorne by 1927. PA 413 was designated in 1928 to run from US 309 (Main Street) in Sellersville east through Perkasie to PA 113 in Blooming Glen. By 1930, the route was extended east from Blooming Glen to US 122 (now US 202), PA 113, and PA 263 in Buckingham. The extended route headed northeast along a concurrency with PA 113 to Kulps Corner, where PA 113 split to the southeast. PA 413 continued northeast to an intersection with US 611, where it headed south for a concurrency with that route to Pipersville. At Pipersville, PA 413 headed southeast along Durham Road to Buckingham. By 1940, PA 413 was paved between Kulps Corner and US 611 and between Pipersville and Buckingham.

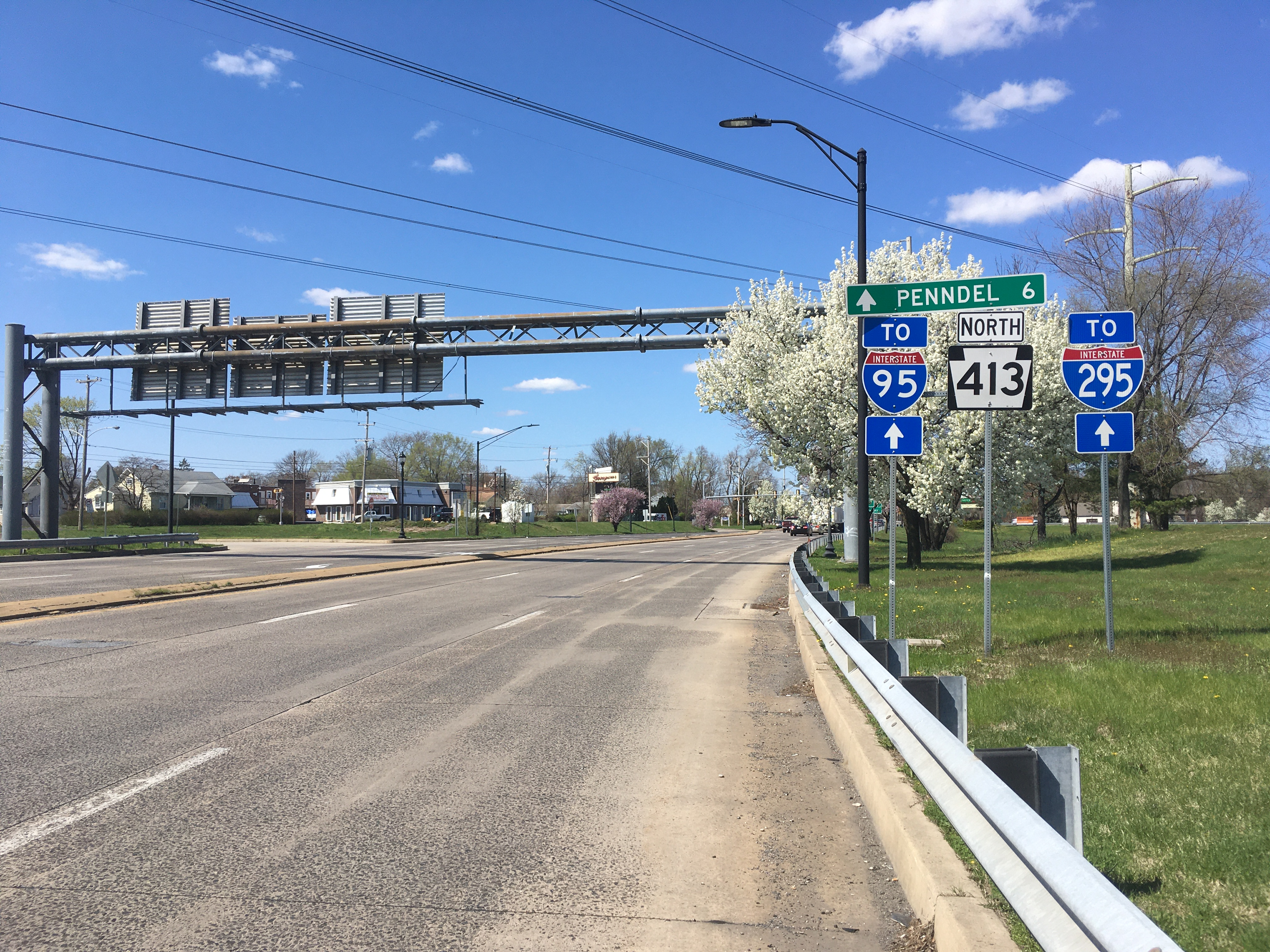
PA 413 northbound past US 13 in Bristol

In 1946, the northern terminus of PA 413 was moved from Sellersville to the US 611 intersection in Pipersville. The former route between Sellersville and Pipersville became an extended PA 152 between Sellersville and Perkasie, unnumbered South Perkasie Road and Blooming Glen Road between Perkasie and Blooming Glen, and a rerouted PA 113 between Kulps Corner and US 611. In addition, the southern terminus was extended from Buckingham to US 13 in Bristol. The route replaced the entirety of PA 101 between Bristol and Penndel and part of PA 113 between Penndel and Buckingham. By 1950, PA 413 was realigned to bypass Bath Road and Durham Road on its current alignment between Bristol and Penndel. In addition, the route was extended south from US 13 to the Burlington–Bristol Bridge, replacing PA 713. In 1977, PA 413 was rerouted to bypass Newtown to the west on the Newtown Bypass. The former alignment of PA 413 in Newtown followed State Street, Washington Street, Sycamore Street, and Durham Road. In 1991, PA 332 and PA 532 were also rerouted to bypass Newtown following an extension of the bypass. Also, the northern terminus of PA 413 at PA 611 was moved to its current location at Deep Run Road instead of where Durham Road intersected PA 611.

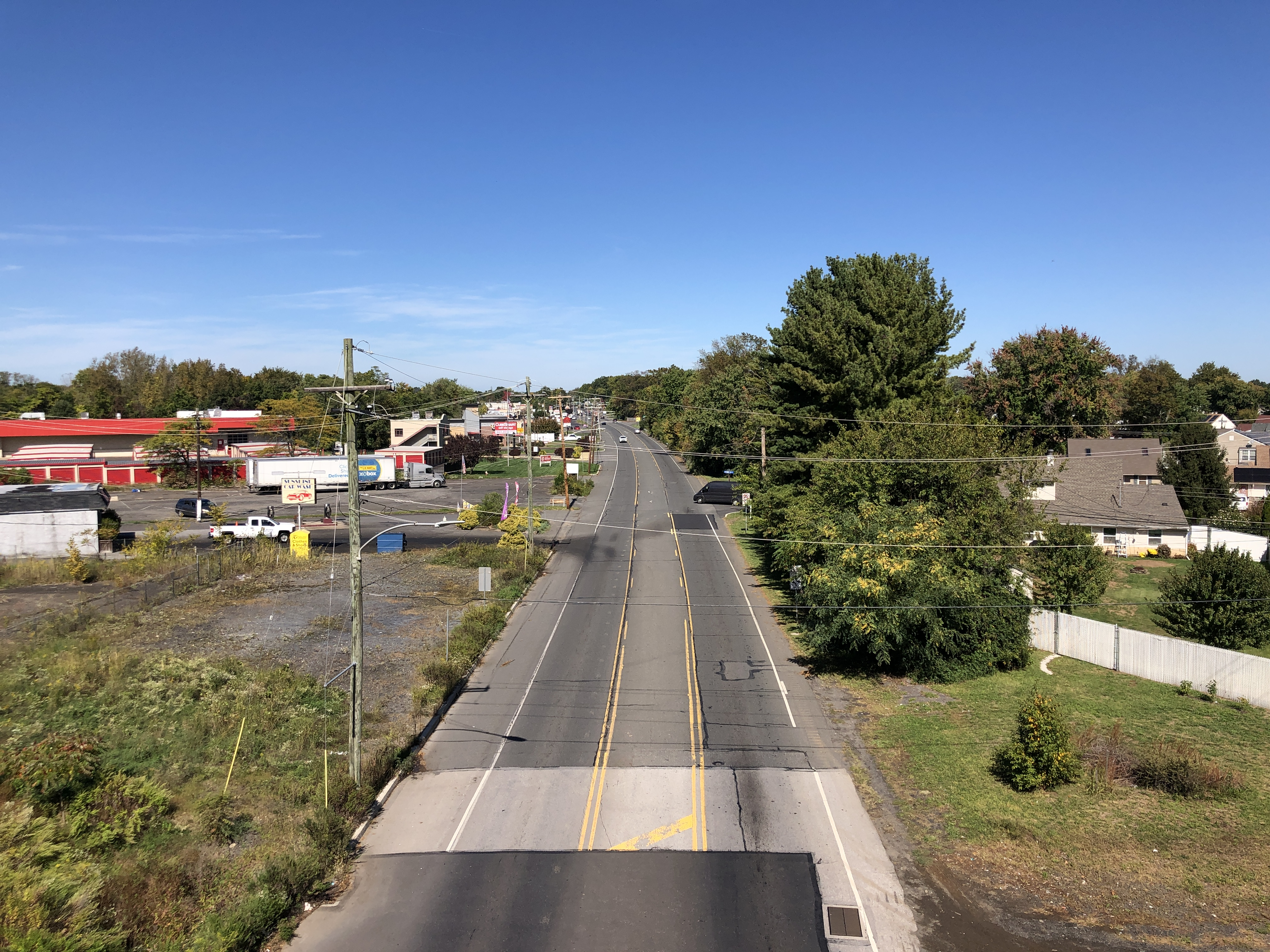
PA 413 northbound in Bristol Township

On May 9, 2002, the section of PA 413 along New Rodgers Road between US 13 in Bristol Township and US 1 Bus. in Middletown Township was renamed the Veterans Highway by an act of the Pennsylvania General Assembly. On April 22, 2014, the portion of PA 413 along the Newtown Bypass was renamed the Officer Gregg Memorial Bypass in honor of Brian S. Gregg, a borough of Newtown police officer who was killed in the line of duty on September 29, 2005.

== Major intersections ==
The entire route is in Bucks County.

| Location | mi | km | Destinations | Notes |
|---|---|---|---|---|
| Delaware River | 0.000 | 0.000 | Route 413 east – Burlington | Continuation into New Jersey |
| Delaware River | 0.000 | 0.000 | Burlington–Bristol Bridge (northbound toll in New Jersey) | |
| Bristol Township | 1.085 | 1.746 | US 13 (Bristol Pike) to Penna Turnpike (I-95) – Bensalem, Tullytown | |
| Bristol Township | 2.242 | 3.608 | I-95 to I-295 east – Philadelphia, New York | Exit 39 on I-95 |
| Middletown Township | 6.035 | 9.712 | US 1 Bus. north (Lincoln Highway) – Oxford Valley | Southern end of US 1 Bus. concurrency |
| Middletown Township | 6.171 | 9.931 | I-295 to I-95 south – Philadelphia, Trenton | Exit 3 on I-295; former I-95 |
| Penndel | 6.958 | 11.198 | US 1 Bus. south (Lincoln Highway) | Northern end of US 1 Bus. concurrency |
| Penndel | 7.030 | 11.314 | PA 513 south (Bellevue Avenue) | Northern terminus of PA 513 |
| Langhorne | 8.323 | 13.395 | PA 213 (East Maple Avenue) – Oxford Valley | |
| Middletown Township | 11.289 | 18.168 | PA 332 east (Newtown Bypass) – Yardley | Southern end of PA 332 concurrency |
| Newtown Township | 11.955 | 19.240 | PA 532 south (Buck Road) – Feasterville | Southern end of PA 532 concurrency |
| Newtown Township | 12.537 | 20.176 | PA 332 west (Richboro Road) – Richboro | Northern end of PA 332 concurrency |
| Newtown Township | 13.409 | 21.580 | PA 532 north (Durham Road) – Washington Crossing | Northern end of PA 532 concurrency |
| Wrightstown Township | 17.562 | 28.263 | PA 232 (Second Street Pike / Windy Bush Road) | |
| Buckingham Township | 22.565 | 36.315 | PA 263 (York Road) to US 202 north – Philadelphia, New Hope | |
| Buckingham Township | 22.704 | 36.539 | US 202 (Doylestown Buckingham Pike) to PA 263 north – Doylestown, New Hope | |
| Bedminster Township | 31.059 | 49.985 | PA 611 (Easton Road) – Doylestown, Easton | Northern terminus |
1.000 mi = 1.609 km; 1.000 km = 0.621 mi: Concurrency terminus; Tolled

== PA 413 Truck ==
Pennsylvania Route 413 Truck
- Location: Bucks County
- Length: 0.7 mi (1,100 m)

Pennsylvania Route 413 Truck signs are posted to direct motorists from southbound PA 611 directly to southbound PA 413 in Bedminster Township in Bucks County, avoiding Old Easton Road.
