= New Jersey Route 413 =

State highway in Burlington County, New Jersey, US

Route 413

Route information
- Maintained by Burlington County Bridge Commission and Burlington County
- Length: 0.76 mi (1,220 m)
- Existed: January 1, 1953–present

Major junctions
- West end: PA 413 at the Pennsylvania state line in Maple Beach
- East end: US 130 / CR 543 in Burlington

Location
- Country: United States
- State: New Jersey
- Counties: Burlington

Highway system
- New Jersey State Highway Routes; Interstate; US; State; Scenic Byways
← Route 347	→ Route 439

Route 413 is a 0.76-mile-long (1.22 km) state highway located entirely in the City of Burlington, New Jersey, United States. It is an eastward extension into New Jersey of the longer Pennsylvania Route 413 (PA 413). The western terminus is in the middle of the Burlington–Bristol Bridge crossing of the Delaware River at the New Jersey–Pennsylvania state border; the eastern terminus is at an intersection with U.S. Route 130 (US 130)/County Route 543 (CR 543). Prior to the 1953 renumbering, Route 413 was Route S25, a prefixed spur of Route 25.

== Route description ==
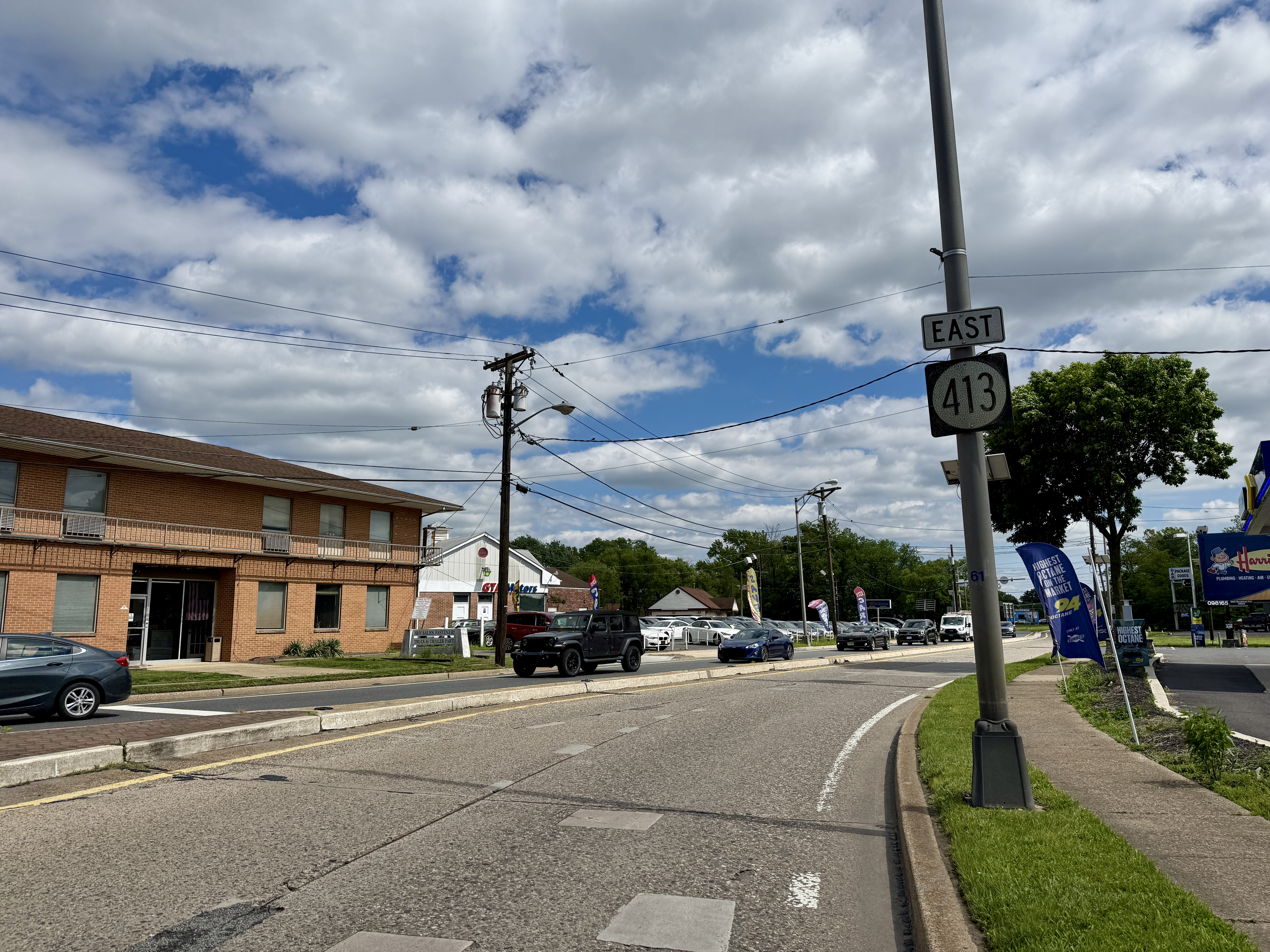
Route 413 eastbound past Broad Street in Burlington

Route 413 begins at the state line, midway along the vertical-lift Burlington–Bristol Bridge, as a continuation of PA 413. As the road descends from the bridge, a toll booth spans the width of the road though a toll is only collected for westbound traffic. The highway heads eastward, heading along Keim Boulevard, and becomes maintained by Burlington County. For eastbound traffic, a right-in/right-out intersection with Veterans Drive is present while for westbound traffic, an exit for Reed Street is located before the toll booths. East of here, an oblong traffic circle, bisected by a grade crossing of NJ Transit's River Line light rail east of the Burlington South station, is found and has intersections with West Broad Street.

East of here, Route 413 continues as a divided highway with one lane in each direction passing through an area of commercial businesses. The road comes to another oblong traffic circle, with intersections at Oakland Avenue, Washington Avenue, and Lincoln Avenue. One house and two businesses are located along the eastern edge of the circle. East of this circle, Route 413 ends at a complex intersection with US 130 (on which CR 543 runs concurrently), Taylor Avenue, Salem Road, and Mott Avenue.

== History ==
Route S25
- Location: Burlington
- Existed: 1927–1953

In the 1927 renumbering of highways in New Jersey, US 130 was assigned as a part of New Jersey State Highway Route 25, which made up US 1 and US 9 as well. During that renumbering in 1927, Route 413 was originally New Jersey State Highway Route S-25, a prefixed spur of State Highway Route 25. The highway remained intact along its alignment in Keim Road to the Burlington–Bristol Bridge until January 1, 1953.

On January 1, 1953, the New Jersey State Highway Department performed a second renumbering of state highways. State Highway Route 25, which had run at the southern terminus with Route 130, was decommissioned for the sole designation. Since State Highway Route 25 was decommissioned, State Highway Route S-25 would be orphaned and was decommissioned that day. The Highway Department renumbered S-25's alignment to Route 413, which continued as PA 413.

== Major intersections ==
The entire route is in Burlington County.

Location	mi	km	Destinations	Notes
Delaware River	0.00	0.00	PA 413 north	Continuation into Pennsylvania
Delaware River	0.00	0.00	Burlington–Bristol Bridge (westbound toll; cash or E-ZPass)	
Burlington	0.76	1.22	US 130 / CR 543 to N.J. Turnpike – Trenton, Mount Holly, Camden	Eastern terminus
1.000 mi = 1.609 km; 1.000 km = 0.621 mi: Tolled
