= Pennsylvania Route 213 =

State highway in Bucks County, Pennsylvania, US

Pennsylvania Route 213

Route information
- Maintained by PennDOT
- Length: 6.948 mi (11.182 km)

Major junctions
- South end: PA 532 in Feasterville
- PA 413 in Langhorne; US 1 in Middletown Township
- North end: US 1 Bus. in Middletown Township

Location
- Country: United States
- State: Pennsylvania
- Counties: Bucks

Highway system
- Pennsylvania State Route System; Interstate; US; State; Scenic; Legislative
← PA 212	→ PA 214

Pennsylvania Route 213 (PA 213) is a 6.95-mile-long (11.18 km) state highway in Bucks County, Pennsylvania. The route runs from PA 532 in Feasterville, which is located in Lower Southampton Township, north to U.S. Route 1 Business (US 1 Bus.) in Middletown Township, near the Oxford Valley Mall. PA 213 is signed as a north-south route but it actually travels east–west through its route, with the northern terminus being well east of the southern terminus but only slightly further north. Along the way, PA 213 passes through the borough of Langhorne and has intermediate junctions with PA 413 in Langhorne and US 1 in Middletown Township. The southernmost part of PA 213 was originally chartered as the Bridgetown and Feasterville Turnpike in 1844. In 1913, the northern portion of present-day PA 213 became a part of the route for the Lincoln Highway, being bypassed in 1923. PA 213 was designated onto its current alignment in 1928.

== Route description ==
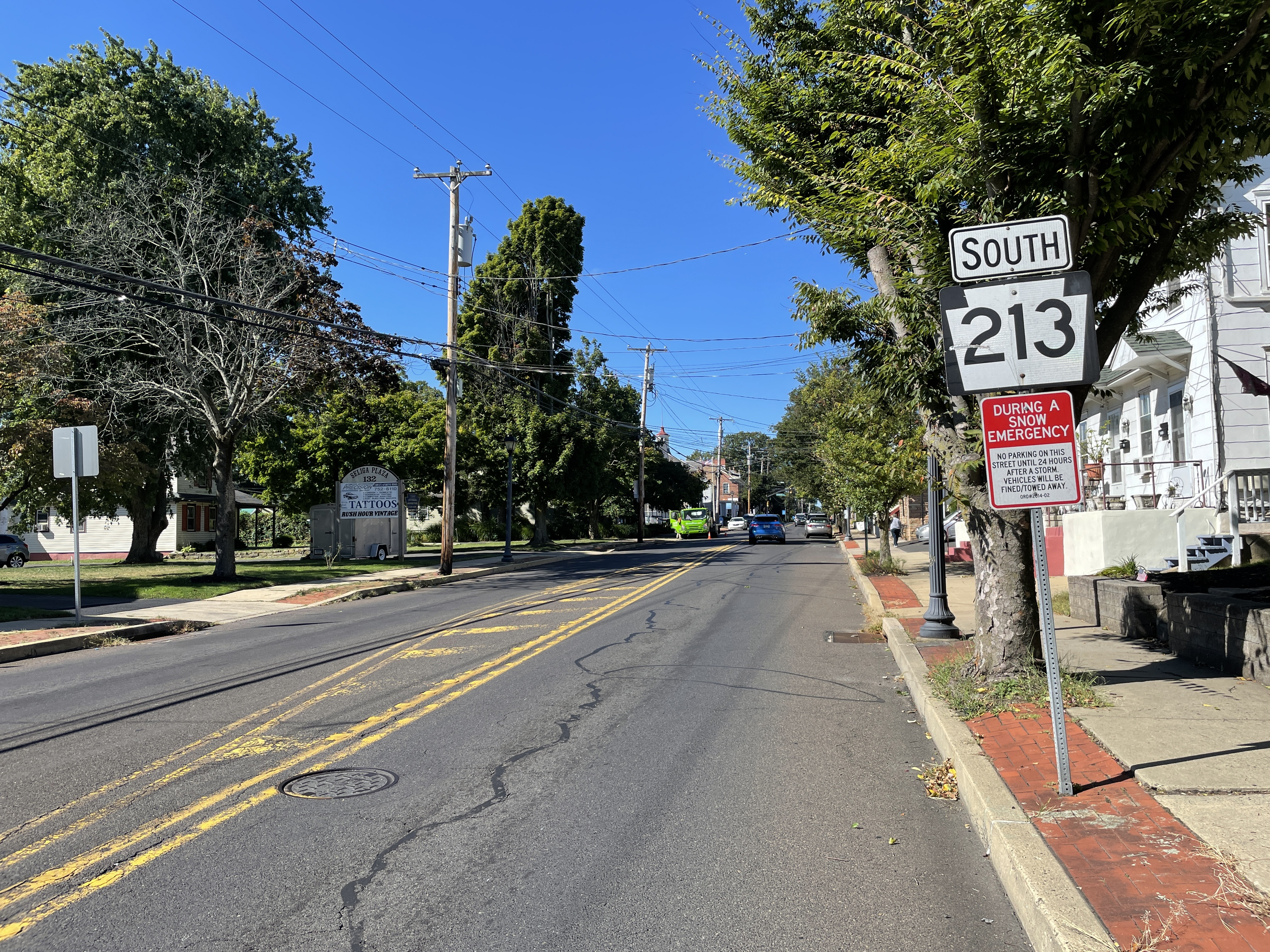
PA 213 southbound past PA 413 in Langhorne

PA 213 begins at an intersection with PA 532 in the community of Feasterville in Lower Southampton Township, Bucks County, heading northeast on two-lane undivided Bridgetown Pike. The road passes through suburban residential areas with some businesses. At the Bristol Road intersection, the route becomes the border between Northampton Township to the northwest and Lower Southampton Township to the southeast as it passes homes with some fields and woods. PA 213 splits from Bridgetown Pike at a roundabout by continuing east onto West Maple Avenue, fully entering Lower Southampton Township again. The road passes between commercial establishments to the north and residences to the south as it runs a short distance to the south of Norfolk Southern's Morrisville Line. The route crosses the Neshaminy Creek into Middletown Township, where it continues through wooded areas of development. PA 213 heads farther south from the railroad tracks and passes residential neighborhoods, coming to an intersection with Old Lincoln Highway to the south of the Middletown Country Club.

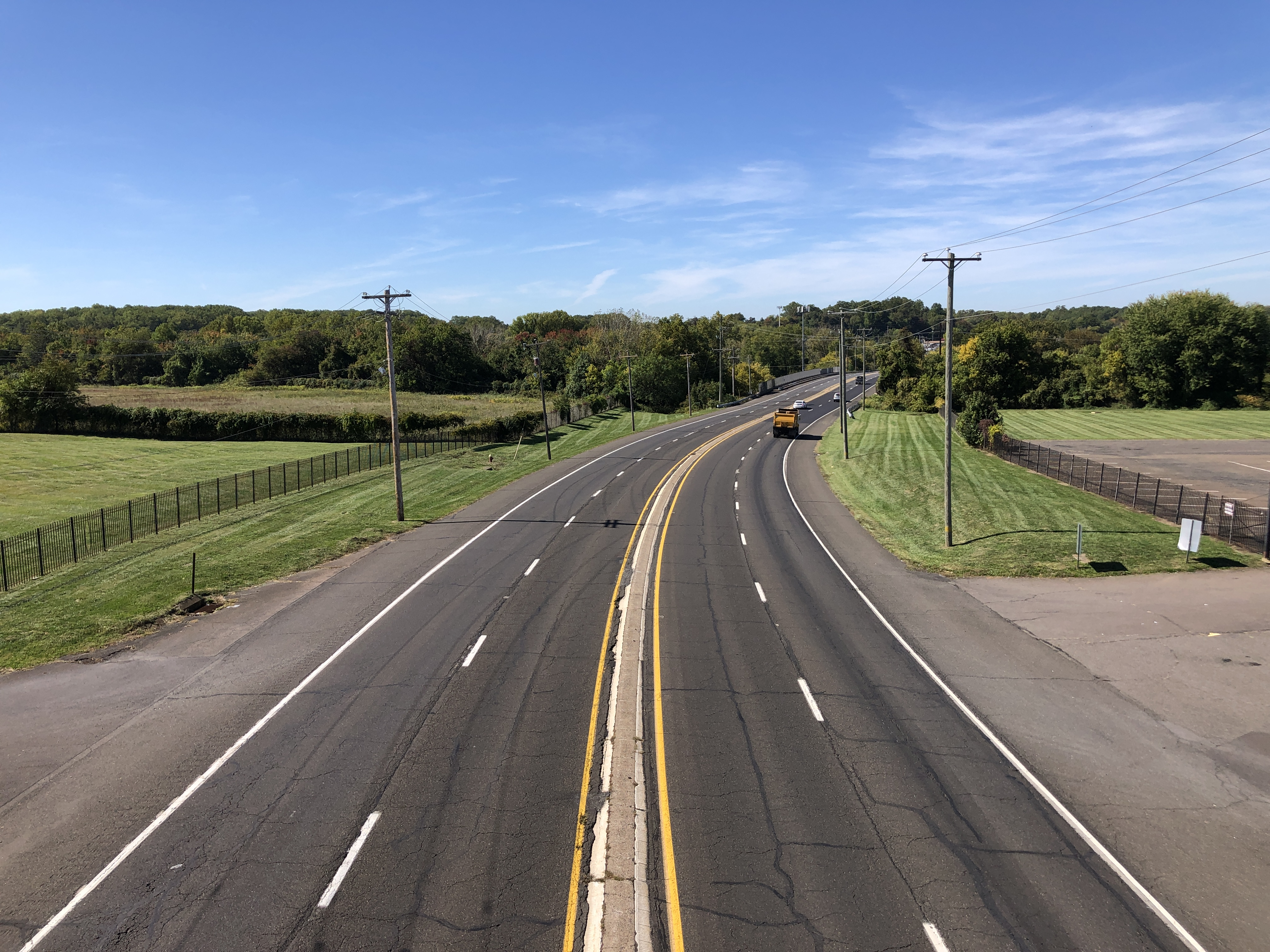
PA 213 southbound in Middletown Township

The road enters the borough of Langhorne and continues past homes, becoming East Maple Avenue upon crossing Bellevue Avenue before reaching an intersection with PA 413 in the commercial center of town. Past this intersection, the route runs through more residential areas and crosses back into Middletown Township. PA 213 heads through woods and widens to four lanes, coming to a partial cloverleaf interchange with the US 1 freeway. Past this interchange, the road runs through commercial areas, crossing Mill Creek, and becomes a divided highway as it reaches a bridge over SEPTA's West Trenton Line and CSX's Trenton Subdivision railroad line along with I-295. The route continues through business areas, crossing Woodbourne Road. PA 213 reaches its northern terminus at a directional intersection with US 1 Bus. (Lincoln Highway) south of the Oxford Valley Mall, with access to northbound US 1 Bus. and access from southbound US 1 Bus. Woodbourne Road provides the missing connections between PA 213 and US 1 Bus.

== History ==
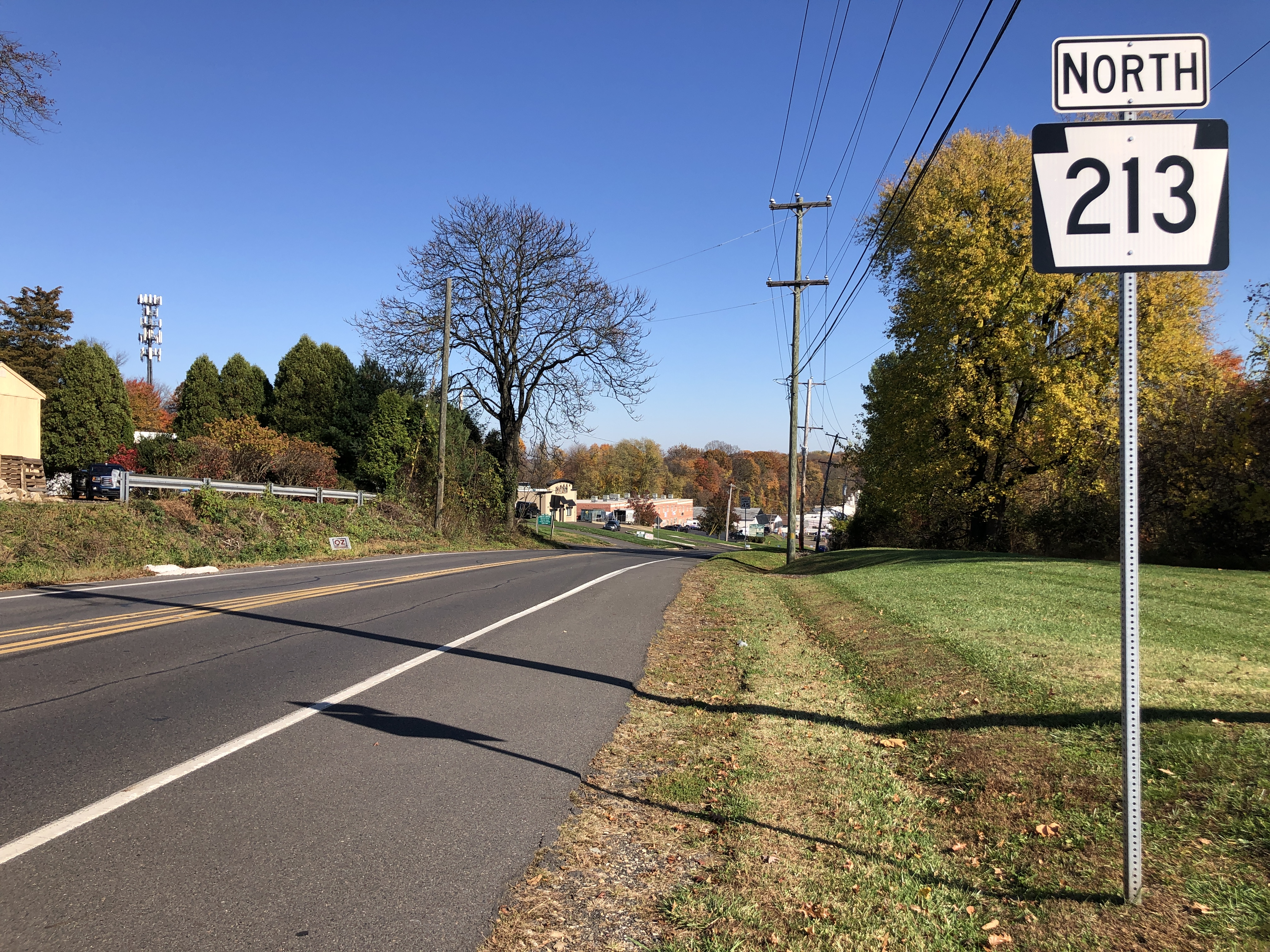
PA 213 northbound past Bridgetown Pike in Lower Southampton Township

The southernmost part of PA 213 was built as part of the Bridgetown and Feasterville Turnpike, a turnpike that connected Feasterville with Bridgetown. This turnpike company was chartered in 1844. The portion of the route from west of Langhorne to the northern terminus became a part Legislative Route 281 when Pennsylvania first legislated its state highways in 1911. In 1913, this portion of road became part of the Lincoln Highway, an auto trail that ran from San Francisco east to New York City. The Lincoln Highway was rerouted to bypass Langhorne to the southeast in 1923. PA 213 was designated in 1928 to follow its current alignment between PA 532 in Feasterville and US 1 (now US 1 Bus.) in Oxford Valley. PA 213 has remained on the same alignment since. On July 21, 2014, the PA 213 bridge over the Neshaminy Creek, which was structurally deficient, closed for a project that replaced it with a new bridge that opened on November 25, 2015. A roundabout opened at the junction of PA 213 and Bridgetown Pike on June 19, 2015, eliminating a sharp intersection. The total cost of the bridge replacement and the roundabout was $7.3 million.

== Major intersections ==
The entire route is in Bucks County.

Location	mi	km	Destinations	Notes
Lower Southampton Township	0.000	0.000	PA 532 (Bridgetown Pike / Buck Road) – Holland, Feasterville	Southern terminus
Langhorne	4.868	7.834	PA 413 (Pine Street) – Newtown, Penndel	
Middletown Township	5.495	8.843	US 1 to I-295 – Morrisville, Philadelphia	Interchange
Middletown Township	6.948	11.182	US 1 Bus. north (Lincoln Highway)	Northern terminus
1.000 mi = 1.609 km; 1.000 km = 0.621 mi
