= Maple Beach =

Maple Beach may refer to the following places:

in the United States:

- Maple Beach, Pennsylvania
- Maple Beach, Washington
- Maple Beach, Wisconsin

in Canada:

- Maple Beach, Ontario
