= Middletown Township, Bucks County, Pennsylvania =

Township in Pennsylvania, US

Middletown Township
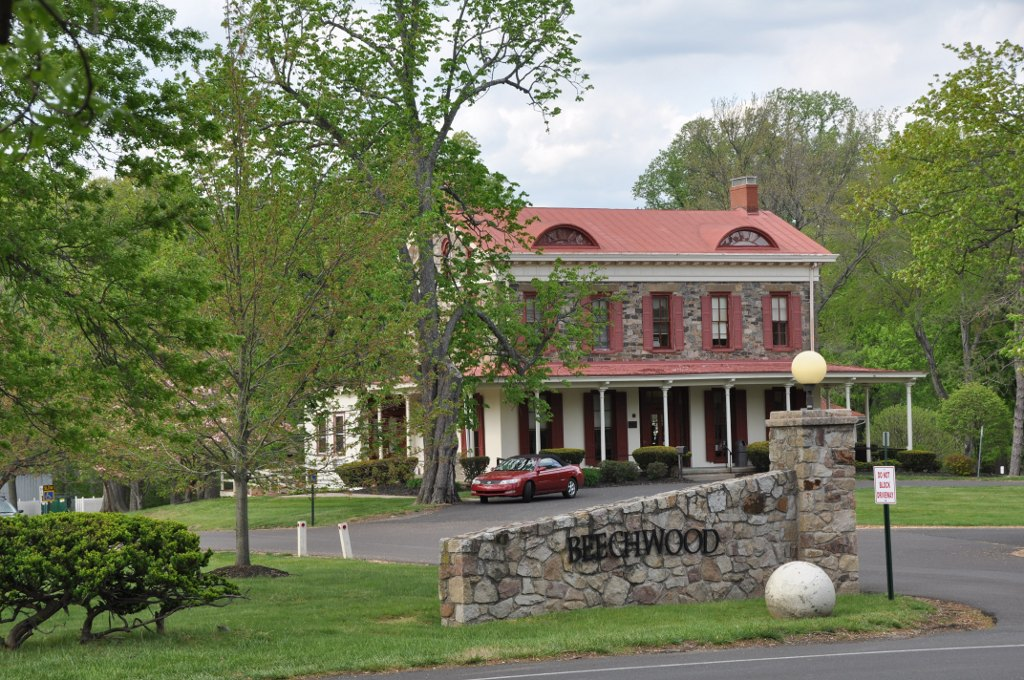
- Beechwood Farmhouse

- Flag Seal

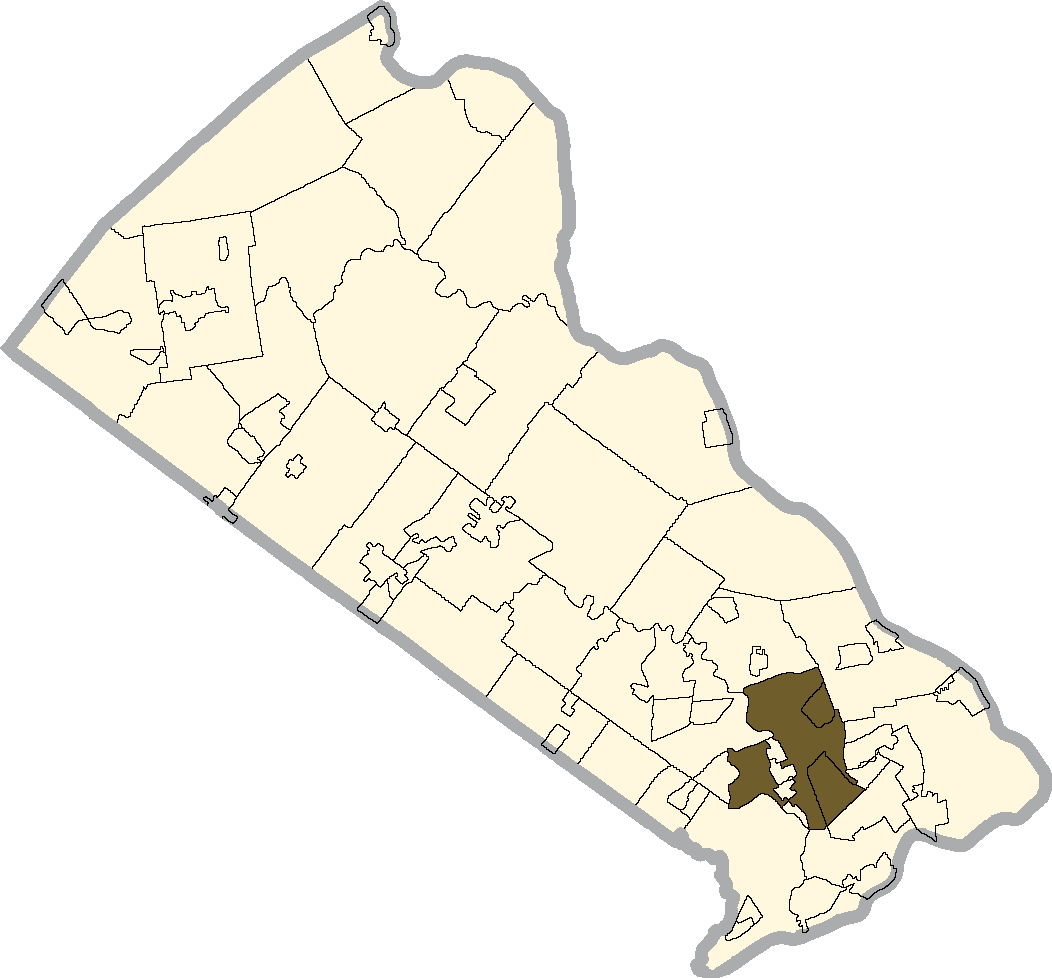
- Location of Middletown Township in Bucks County, Pennsylvania

- Location of Middletown Township in Pennsylvania and the United States Middletown Township (the United States)
- Coordinates: 40°09′45″N 74°53′43″W
- Country: United States
- State: Pennsylvania
- County: Bucks County

Area
  - Total: 19.32 sq mi (50.0 km^{2})
  - Land: 18.89 sq mi (48.9 km^{2})
  - Water: 0.42 sq mi (1.1 km^{2})
- Elevation: 75 ft (23 m)

Population (2020)
  - Total: 46,040
  - Estimate (2022): 45,654
  - Density: 2,437/sq mi (941.0/km^{2})
- Time zone: UTC-5 (EST)
  - Summer (DST): UTC-4 (EDT)
- Area codes: 215, 267, and 445
- FIPS code: 42-017-49120
- Website: www.middletownbucks.org

Middletown Township is a township in Bucks County, Pennsylvania, United States. The population was 46,040 at the 2020 census. Many sections of Levittown are located in the southern end of the township. The municipality surrounds the boroughs of Langhorne, Langhorne Manor, Penndel, and Hulmeville; much of the township beyond Levittown uses Langhorne as its mailing address. The township is located within the Philadelphia metropolitan area.

Also located within the township is Core Creek Park. The township also has many acres of protected woods, the largest being the woods behind Neshaminy High School. The Neshaminy Creek flows through these woods. There are also some few protected farms, most significantly that of Styer's Orchards, which was saved from turning into the site of 632 homes in the late 1990s.

Sesame Place is located in Middletown Township.

== Geography ==
According to the U.S. Census Bureau, the township has a total area of 19.4 square miles (50.2 km^{2}), 19.1 square miles (49.5 km^{2}) of which is land and 0.3 square mile (0.7 km^{2}) (1.39%) of which is water.

Place names in Middletown Township include Bucktoe, Chicken Foot, Edgewood, Glenlake, Levittown (also in Bristol and Falls Township, and Tullytown Borough), Maple Point, Oxford Valley, Parkland, Pickpocket, Timbucktoo, and Woodbourne.

Natural features include Core Creek, Lake Luxembourg in Core Creek Park, Edge Hill, Langhorne Water Works Run, Neshaminy Creek, and Newtown Creek.

The Fall Line, which separates the Atlantic Coastal Plain region from the Piedmont region, runs through Middletown Township.

== History ==
Middletown Township was formally established in 1692 and originally included within its boundaries the present-day boroughs of Langhorne, Langhorne Manor, Hulmeville, and Penndel.

Middletown Township began as a farming community, with close proximity to trading towns such as Langhorne and Newtown. There are not many significant historical places located in the township apart from homes and farms constructed in the late 18th century.

Middletown Township was sparsely populated before 1950: there were only a little more than 2,000 people in 1930, compared to about 46,000 in 2010. Then William Levitt began his second Levittown, which included land of four municipalities, including that of Middletown. Twelve developments were constructed in the township, with the majority of them containing hundreds of homes. This marked the first planned residential development in the township. Meanwhile, Langhorne Terrace was being constructed out of the Neshaminy Woods. During this decade, the township grew by over 440%, or more than 20,000 new residents. As the decades passed, its woods, countryside, and farms continued to be swallowed into homes and businesses. In the 1970s, the Oxford Valley Mall was constructed, and at the time was named the country's largest mall for a short time.

Growth continues to this day; however, Middletown has taken action. The township preserved hundreds of acres now known as Core Creek Park, which includes the sprawling Lake Luxembourg. Many woodlands and a few farms have also been saved. The township has transformed from a bucolic, rural area to a car-centric and haphazardly planned community, with rising crime and an award-winning school district. The township is still seeing a growing population, attracting many out-of-state residents and international migrants.

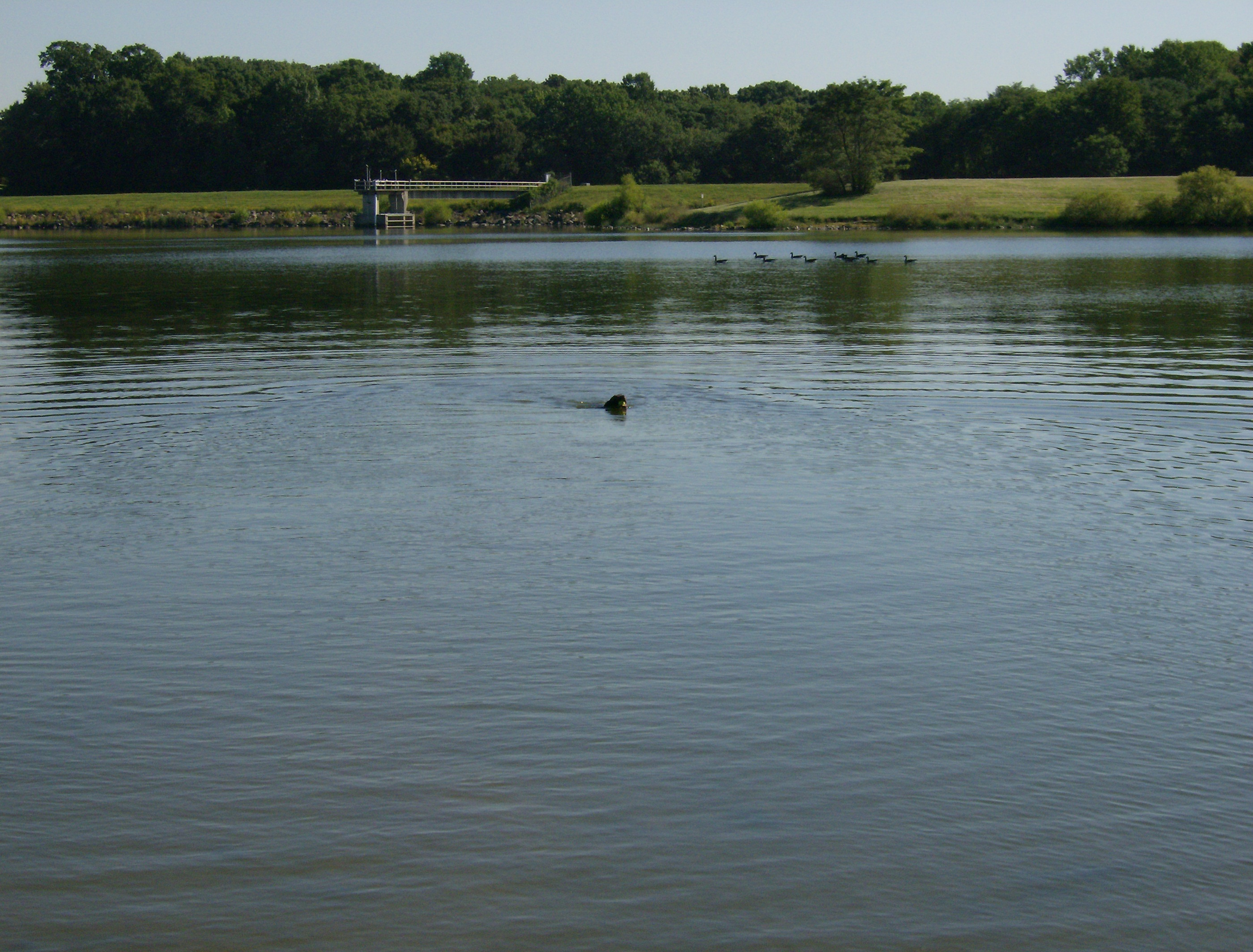
Lake Luxembourg in Core Creek Park.

Middletown is nearby the cities of Philadelphia, Trenton, and Princeton. Both I-295 and U.S. 1 pass through the township, which are at or over capacity with rush hour traffic.

Edgemont and Harewood and Beechwood are listed on the National Register of Historic Places.

== Demographics ==
As of a 2014 estimate, the township was 84.1% Non-Hispanic White, 5.5% Black or African American, 0.2% Native American, 5.0% Asian, 0.2% Some other race, and 1.4% were two or more races. 4.9% of the population were of Hispanic or Latino ancestry.

As of the 2010 census, the township was 88.3% Non-Hispanic White, 3.2% Black or African American, 0.2% Native American, 4.0% Asian, and 1.6% were two or more races. 3.1% of the population were of Hispanic or Latino ancestry.

Historical population
Census	Pop.	Note	%±
1930	2,095		—
1940	3,136		49.7%
1950	4,987		59.0%
1960	26,936		440.1%
1970	32,364		20.2%
1980	34,246		5.8%
1990	43,063		25.7%
2000	44,141		2.5%
2010	45,436		2.9%
2020	46,040		1.3%

As of the 2000 census, there were 44,141 people, 15,321 households, and 11,659 families residing in the township. The population density was 2,309.5 inhabitants per square mile (891.7/km^{2}). There were 15,713 housing units at an average density of 822.1 per square mile (317.4/km^{2}). The racial makeup of the township was 93.86% White, 2.10% African American, 0.15% Native American, 2.40% Asian, 0.55% from other races, and 0.93% from two or more races. Hispanic or Latino of any race were 1.71% of the population. The Asian population is a fast-growing segment of the township.

There were 15,321 households, out of which 38.2% had children under the age of 18 living with them, 63.3% were married couples living together, 9.3% had a female householder with no husband present, and 23.9% were non-families. 19.4% of all households were made up of individuals, and 7.3% had someone living alone who was 65 years of age or older. The average household size was 2.81 and the average family size was 3.25.

In the township the population was spread out, with 26.2% under the age of 18, 7.7% from 18 to 24, 29.7% from 25 to 44, 23.4% from 45 to 64, and 13.0% who were 65 years of age or older. The median age was 38 years. For every 100 females there were 94.9 males. For every 100 females age 18 and over, there were 90.4 males.

The median income for a household in the township was $63,964, and the median income for a family was $71,271. Males had a median income of $47,244 versus $32,154 for females. The per capita income for the township was $25,213. About 2.1% of families and 3.3% of the population were below the poverty line, including 2.8% of those under age 18 and 4.7% of those age 65 or over.

Like much of the Philadelphia metropolitan area, Middletown's immigrant population is skyrocketing. With many new, upscale housing developments, many of the households were bought by foreign-born residents. Middletown's immigrant population largely consists of Indians, Koreans, Mexican Americans and Russians. However, many other groups, such as Chinese, Hispanics, and Arabs, have growing numbers. Aside from European immigration, Middletown's immigrant population has mostly arrived after 1990.

== Transportation ==
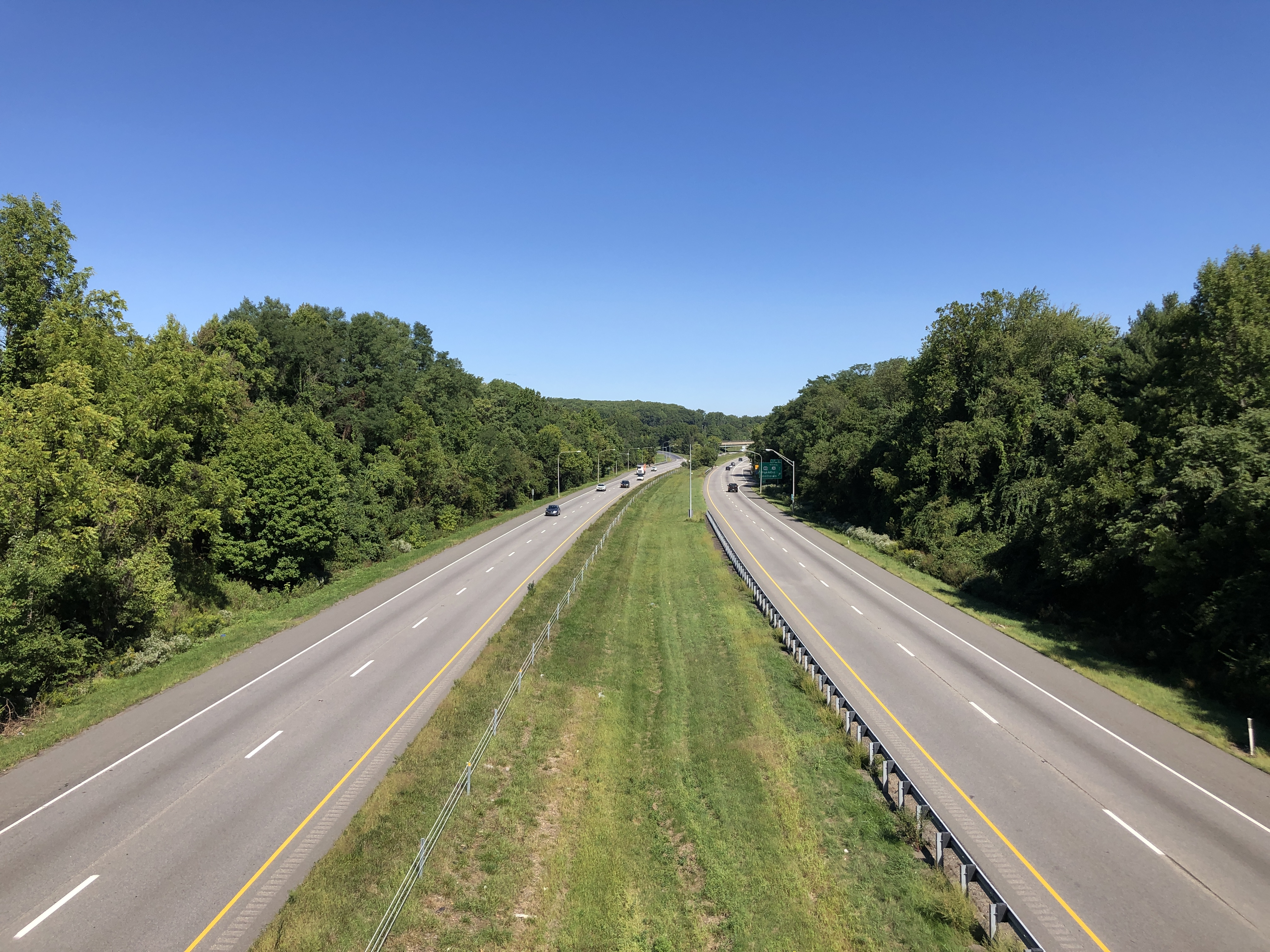
I-295 eastbound in Middletown Township

As of 2018 there were 189.70 miles (305.29 km) of public roads in Middletown Township, of which 50.63 miles (81.48 km) were maintained by the Pennsylvania Department of Transportation (PennDOT) and 139.07 miles (223.81 km) were maintained by the township.

Interstate 295 is the most prominent highway traversing Middletown Township. It follows a generally south-to-north alignment across eastern portions of the township. U.S. Route 1 also traverses the township as a freeway, following a southwest-to-northeast alignment through the center of the township. U.S. Route 1 Business follows the Lincoln Highway parallel and to the south of the US 1 freeway. Pennsylvania Route 213 follows Maple Avenue along an east-west alignment through the center of the township, terminating at US 1 Business near the east edge of the township. Pennsylvania Route 332 briefly enters the northern edge of the township along the Newtown Bypass. Pennsylvania Route 413 follows a generally southeast-to-northwest alignment through the center of the township, utilizing several roadways. Finally, Pennsylvania Route 513 briefly enters the township as it travels between Penndel and Hulmeville.

SEPTA Regional Rail's West Trenton Line runs through Middletown Township, with the Woodbourne station located in the township and the Langhorne station located nearby in Langhorne Manor. SEPTA provides bus service to Middletown Township along City Bus route 14 and Suburban Bus routes 127, 128, 129, and 130, serving points of interest in the township and offering connections to Philadelphia and other suburbs.

== Politics ==
The township was once dominated by the Republican Party like most of Bucks County, due to a more bucolic, rural feel. However, after years of growth, including migration of peoples from Democratic areas, the area has been trending Democratic. The Neshaminy School Board and Middletown Township Board of Supervisors both lack a one party dominance, which used to be mostly or all Republican. In the 2006 mid-term elections, Ed Rendell (Governor), Bob Casey (U.S. Senator) and Chris King (Pennsylvania's 142nd Representative District), who are all Democrats, won the township. The heavily battled election between Mike Fitzpatrick and Patrick Murphy for the 8th Congressional district was split 50/50 like much of the area.

In 2024, member of the American Militia Movement Justin Mohn shot and beheaded his father, a Federal employee, and uploaded a video to YouTube calling for an overthrow to the United States government, displaying his father's severed head. Mohn was captured wandering on a nearby military base where he surrendered to authorities.

== Education ==
Middletown Township lies within the Neshaminy School District. Students living within township boundaries may attend either Albert Schweitzer Elementary School, Herbert Hoover Elementary School, Pearl S. Buck Elementary School, Tawanka Elementary School, or Walter Miller Elementary School for grades K-4, depending on where they live. Carl Sandburg Middle School and Maple Point Middle School serve students in grades 5–8, and Neshaminy High School serves students in grades 9-12.

Cairn University, a private religious university, is partially located within township boundaries.

== Commerce and growth ==
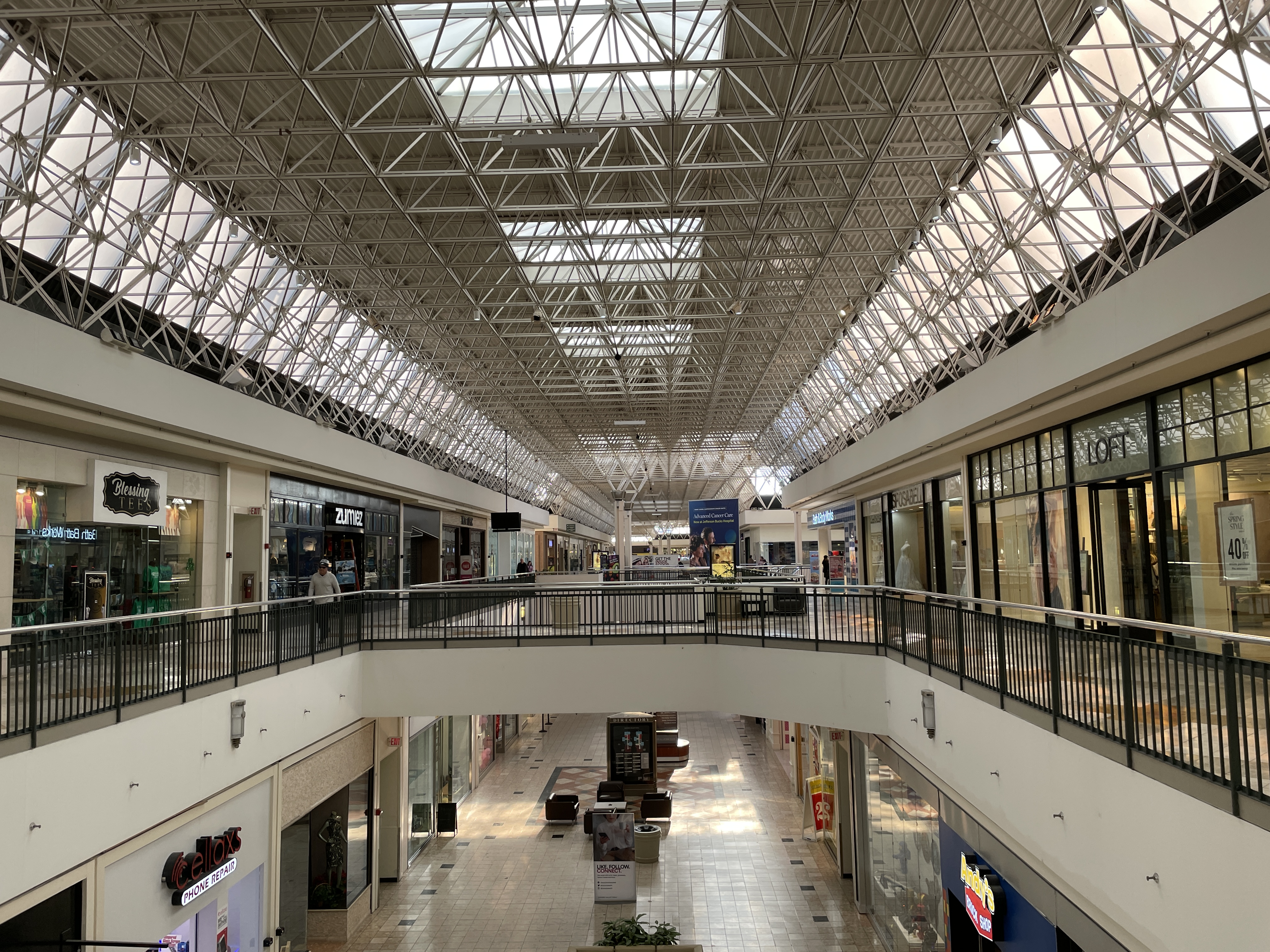
Oxford Valley Mall

Oxford Valley Mall is at the center of the township's commercial retail area; it is surrounded by over 30 car dealerships and car automotive shops and over 40 restaurant chains, and several major retail stores. A number of furniture stores, hotel chains, a major hospital, and office buildings are also located in the Oxford Valley Mall vicinity.

Many homes have been constructed around the mall, the oldest being Langhorne Gardens, a branch of Levittown, Pennsylvania. Many newly constructed townhouses, condos, and large single-family homes have been built. As thousands of people from other continents have settled near the mall, there is a wide variety of ethnic food, churches, and superstores in its vicinity.

Traffic has become a major concern. Nearby U.S. 1 and Interstate 295 allow commuters to congest the mall area roads, along with the surplus of residents in the area. Over 400,000 people reside less than ten minutes from the mall, plus the many commuters from nearby New Jersey. Many major construction projects are planned for the major access roads. There is a significant, and fast-growing foreign presence in the area.

Middletown Township is the home to the corporate headquarters of McCaffrey's Food Markets, an upscale regional grocery store chain which has locations in Pennsylvania and New Jersey.

== Housing ==
Middletown has a large mix of housing construction and time periods, which range from the fifties to new construction. Almost all the development that occurred in the fifties were the Levittown sections. Housing ranges from cheap single-family housing to exorbitant single-family living, and also townhomes, condos, assisted living, apartment complexes, deluxe apartment complexes, and 55+ housing. There are no trailer parks in Middletown. There are a handful of homes constructed before 1950, even a few dating back to the 18th century, however they are individual homes and scattered, due to Levittown being the first planned development. The most significant area with scattered housing periods is the area of Parkland. Houses date from every decade of the 20th century, and the 21st. Parkland has the lowest land value and family incomes than any other area of Middletown.

== Climate ==
According to the Köppen climate classification system, Middletown Township has a Hot-summer, Humid continental climate (Dfa). Dfa climates are characterized by at least one month having an average mean temperature ≤ 32.0 °F (0.0 °C), at least four months with an average mean temperature ≥ 50.0 °F (10.0 °C), at least one month with an average mean temperature ≥ 71.6 °F (22.0 °C) and no significant precipitation difference between seasons. Although most summer days are slightly humid in Middletown Township, episodes of heat and high humidity can occur with heat index values > 108 °F (42 °C). Since 1981, the highest air temperature was 102.9 °F (39.4 °C) on July 22, 2011, and the highest daily average mean dew point was 75.3 °F (24.1 °C) on August 13, 2016. The average wettest month is July which corresponds with the annual peak in thunderstorm activity. Since 1981, the wettest calendar day was 6.60 inches (168 mm) on August 27, 2011.

During the winter months, the average annual extreme minimum air temperature is 1.2 °F (−17.1 °C). Since 1981, the coldest air temperature was −9.9 °F (−23.3 °C) on January 22, 1984. Episodes of extreme cold and wind can occur with wind chill values < −9 °F (−23 °C). The average annual snowfall (Nov-Apr) is between 24 inches (61 cm) and 30 inches (76 cm). Ice storms and large snowstorms depositing ≥ 12 inches (30 cm) of snow occur once every few years, particularly during nor’easters from December through February.

Climate data for Middletown Township, Pennsylvania (Neshaminy Falls) 1991–2020 normals, extremes 1915–present
Month	Jan	Feb	Mar	Apr	May	Jun	Jul	Aug	Sep	Oct	Nov	Dec	Year
Record high °F (°C)	74 (23)	79 (26)	88 (31)	95 (35)	97 (36)	102 (39)	105 (41)	102 (39)	98 (37)	95 (35)	88 (31)	76 (24)	105 (41)
Mean daily maximum °F (°C)	39.4 (4.1)	42.2 (5.7)	50.5 (10.3)	62.5 (16.9)	72.3 (22.4)	81.1 (27.3)	85.8 (29.9)	84.0 (28.9)	77.4 (25.2)	65.6 (18.7)	54.6 (12.6)	44.4 (6.9)	63.3 (17.4)
Daily mean °F (°C)	30.4 (−0.9)	32.4 (0.2)	40.0 (4.4)	51.0 (10.6)	60.9 (16.1)	70.5 (21.4)	75.5 (24.2)	73.8 (23.2)	66.6 (19.2)	54.6 (12.6)	43.9 (6.6)	35.4 (1.9)	52.9 (11.6)
Mean daily minimum °F (°C)	21.5 (−5.8)	22.6 (−5.2)	29.4 (−1.4)	39.5 (4.2)	49.5 (9.7)	59.8 (15.4)	65.2 (18.4)	63.5 (17.5)	55.7 (13.2)	43.5 (6.4)	33.2 (0.7)	26.5 (−3.1)	42.5 (5.8)
Record low °F (°C)	−18 (−28)	−18 (−28)	−2 (−19)	8 (−13)	29 (−2)	34 (1)	43 (6)	35 (2)	30 (−1)	19 (−7)	−3 (−19)	−10 (−23)	−18 (−28)
Average precipitation inches (mm)	3.69 (94)	3.06 (78)	4.58 (116)	3.97 (101)	4.00 (102)	4.58 (116)	4.94 (125)	4.67 (119)	4.72 (120)	4.21 (107)	3.63 (92)	4.65 (118)	50.70 (1,288)
Average snowfall inches (cm)	7.0 (18)	5.7 (14)	3.5 (8.9)	0.0 (0.0)	0.0 (0.0)	0.0 (0.0)	0.0 (0.0)	0.0 (0.0)	0.0 (0.0)	0.1 (0.25)	0.2 (0.51)	3.4 (8.6)	19.9 (51)
Average precipitation days (≥ 0.01 in)	10.5	9.9	10.7	10.7	11.3	10.5	10.0	9.0	8.6	9.3	8.7	10.6	119.8
Average snowy days (≥ 0.1 in)	2.3	1.9	1.2	0.0	0.0	0.0	0.0	0.0	0.0	0.1	0.1	1.2	6.8
Source: NOAA

Climate data for Middletown Township, Elevation 151 ft (46 m), 1981-2010 normals, extremes 1981-2018
Month	Jan	Feb	Mar	Apr	May	Jun	Jul	Aug	Sep	Oct	Nov	Dec	Year
Record high °F (°C)	71.4 (21.9)	77.8 (25.4)	87.5 (30.8)	94.5 (34.7)	95.4 (35.2)	96.6 (35.9)	102.9 (39.4)	100.5 (38.1)	98.4 (36.9)	88.5 (31.4)	81.2 (27.3)	75.9 (24.4)	102.9 (39.4)
Mean daily maximum °F (°C)	40.1 (4.5)	43.4 (6.3)	51.6 (10.9)	63.5 (17.5)	73.0 (22.8)	82.2 (27.9)	86.4 (30.2)	84.7 (29.3)	77.9 (25.5)	66.6 (19.2)	55.6 (13.1)	44.5 (6.9)	64.2 (17.9)
Daily mean °F (°C)	31.9 (−0.1)	34.5 (1.4)	41.9 (5.5)	52.6 (11.4)	62.0 (16.7)	71.6 (22.0)	76.1 (24.5)	74.6 (23.7)	67.4 (19.7)	55.9 (13.3)	46.2 (7.9)	36.4 (2.4)	54.4 (12.4)
Mean daily minimum °F (°C)	23.8 (−4.6)	25.6 (−3.6)	32.2 (0.1)	41.7 (5.4)	51.0 (10.6)	60.9 (16.1)	65.9 (18.8)	64.5 (18.1)	57.0 (13.9)	45.2 (7.3)	36.8 (2.7)	28.3 (−2.1)	44.5 (6.9)
Record low °F (°C)	−9.9 (−23.3)	−2.4 (−19.1)	4.2 (−15.4)	18.1 (−7.7)	33.7 (0.9)	42.3 (5.7)	48.4 (9.1)	43.2 (6.2)	36.4 (2.4)	25.4 (−3.7)	12.5 (−10.8)	0.1 (−17.7)	−9.9 (−23.3)
Average precipitation inches (mm)	3.55 (90)	2.76 (70)	4.21 (107)	3.93 (100)	4.29 (109)	4.31 (109)	5.15 (131)	4.33 (110)	4.33 (110)	3.76 (96)	3.56 (90)	4.03 (102)	48.21 (1,225)
Average relative humidity (%)	65.6	62.5	58.0	57.5	61.9	65.7	66.4	68.6	69.8	68.5	67.4	67.6	65.0
Average dew point °F (°C)	21.7 (−5.7)	23.0 (−5.0)	28.2 (−2.1)	38.0 (3.3)	48.8 (9.3)	59.5 (15.3)	64.1 (17.8)	63.6 (17.6)	57.2 (14.0)	45.7 (7.6)	36.0 (2.2)	26.7 (−2.9)	42.8 (6.0)
Source: PRISM

== Ecology ==
According to the A. W. Kuchler U.S. potential natural vegetation types, Middletown Township would have a dominant vegetation type of Appalachian Oak (104) with a dominant vegetation form of Eastern Hardwood Forest (25). The plant hardiness zone is 7a with an average annual extreme minimum air temperature of 1.2 °F (−17.1 °C). The spring bloom typically begins by April 7 and fall color usually peaks by November 3.
