= Edgemont (Langhorne, Pennsylvania) =

Historic house in Pennsylvania, United States

- U.S. National Register of Historic Places
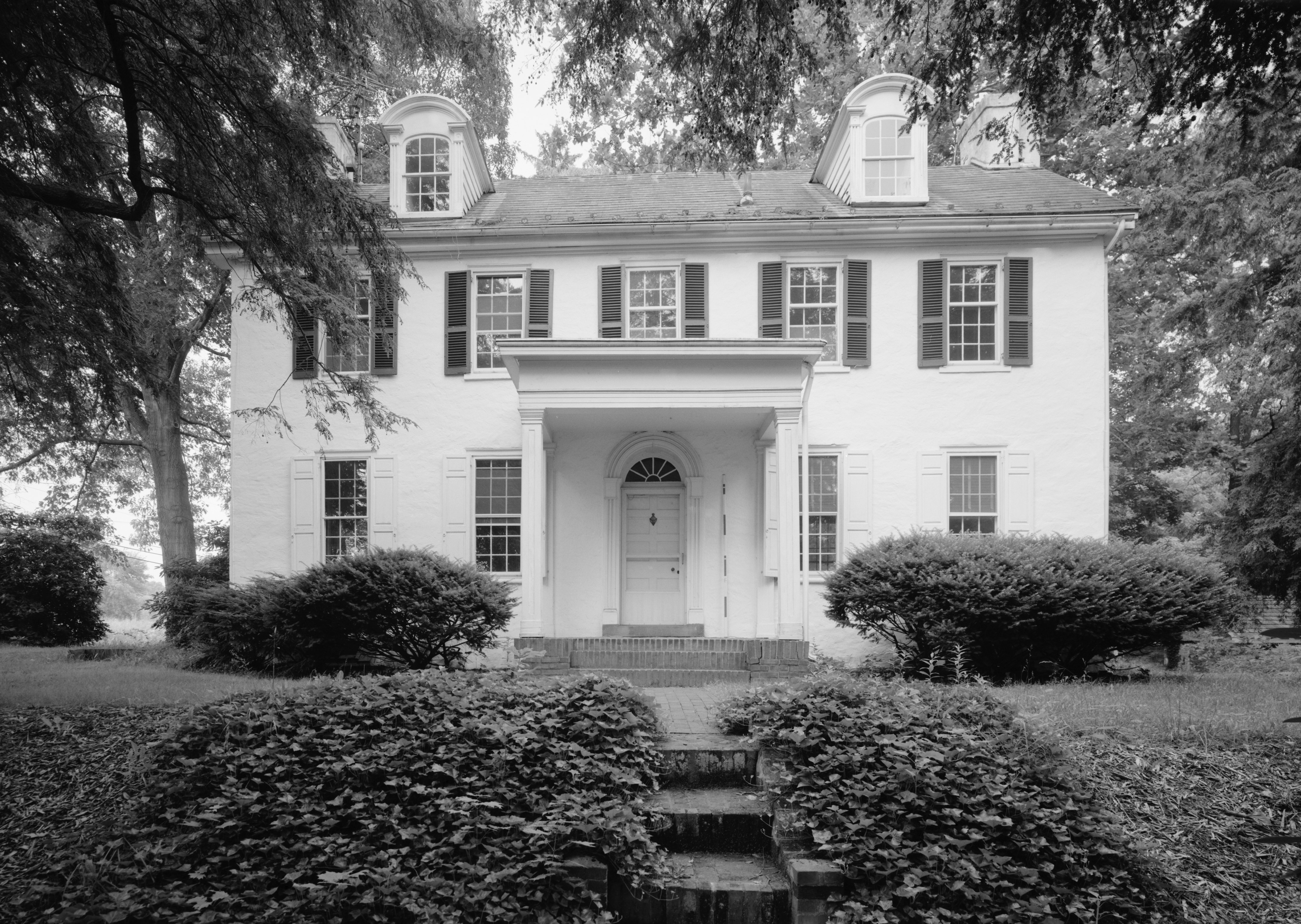
- Edgemont, HABS Photo

- Location within Pennsylvania Location within the United States
- Location: North of Langhorne on Bridgetown Road, Middletown Township, Pennsylvania
- Coordinates: 40°11′30″N 74°55′25″W
- Area: 0.1 acres (0.040 ha)
- Built: c. 1820-1823, c. 1830
- Built by: Jenks, Charles
- Architectural style: Federal
- NRHP reference No.: 77001126
- Added to NRHP: December 16, 1977

Edgemont, also known as The Jenks Homestead, is a historic home located in Middletown Township, Bucks County, Pennsylvania. It was originally built about 1820–1823, and is a 2 1/2-story, five-bay, stuccoed stone dwelling in the Federal style. About 1830, a rear kitchen ell was added and later modified in the 1870s. The house was restored in the 1970s.

It was added to the National Register of Historic Places in 1977.
