= Riverside–Delanco Bridge =

Riverside-Delanco Bridge
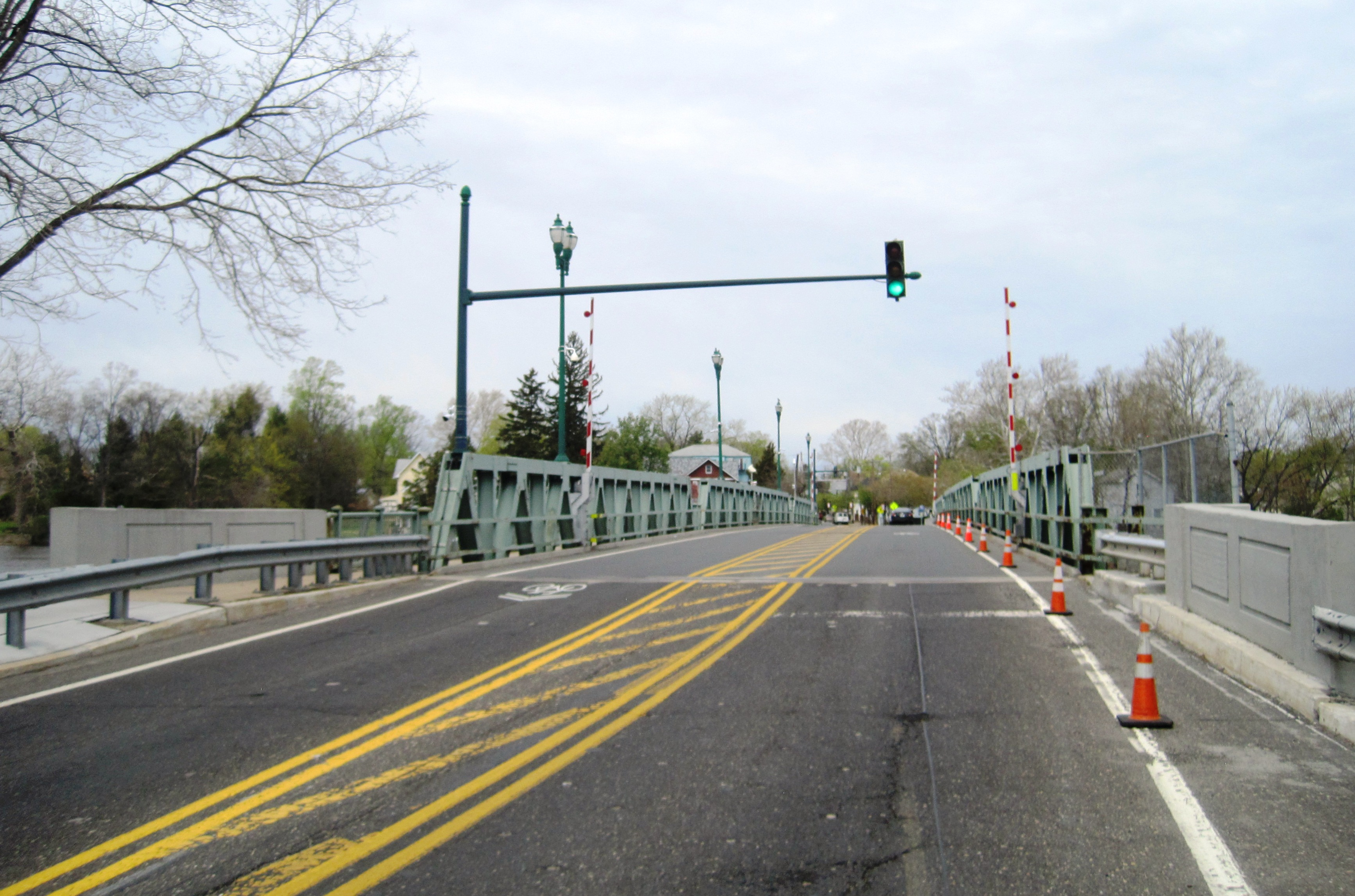
- Photo of the bridge from the Riverside landing
- Coordinates: 40°02′40″N 74°57′30″W
- Carries: 2 lanes of CR 543
- Crosses: Rancocas Creek
- Locale: Riverside, New Jersey and Delanco, New Jersey
- Maintained by: Burlington County Bridge Commission

Characteristics
- Design: Truss with swing section

History
- Construction start: 1934
- Construction end: 1935

Location
- Interactive map of Riverside-Delanco Bridge

The Riverside–Delanco Bridge is a truss bridge with a central swing span that carries CR 543 across the Rancocas Creek, between Riverside and Delanco in New Jersey. The current bridge was built in 1934-1935 to replace the 1901 bridge, which itself replaced an 1870 structure. It is currently managed by the Burlington County Bridge Commission.
