= Woodbourne, Pennsylvania =

Unincorporated community in Pennsylvania, US

Woodbourne
- Census-designated place
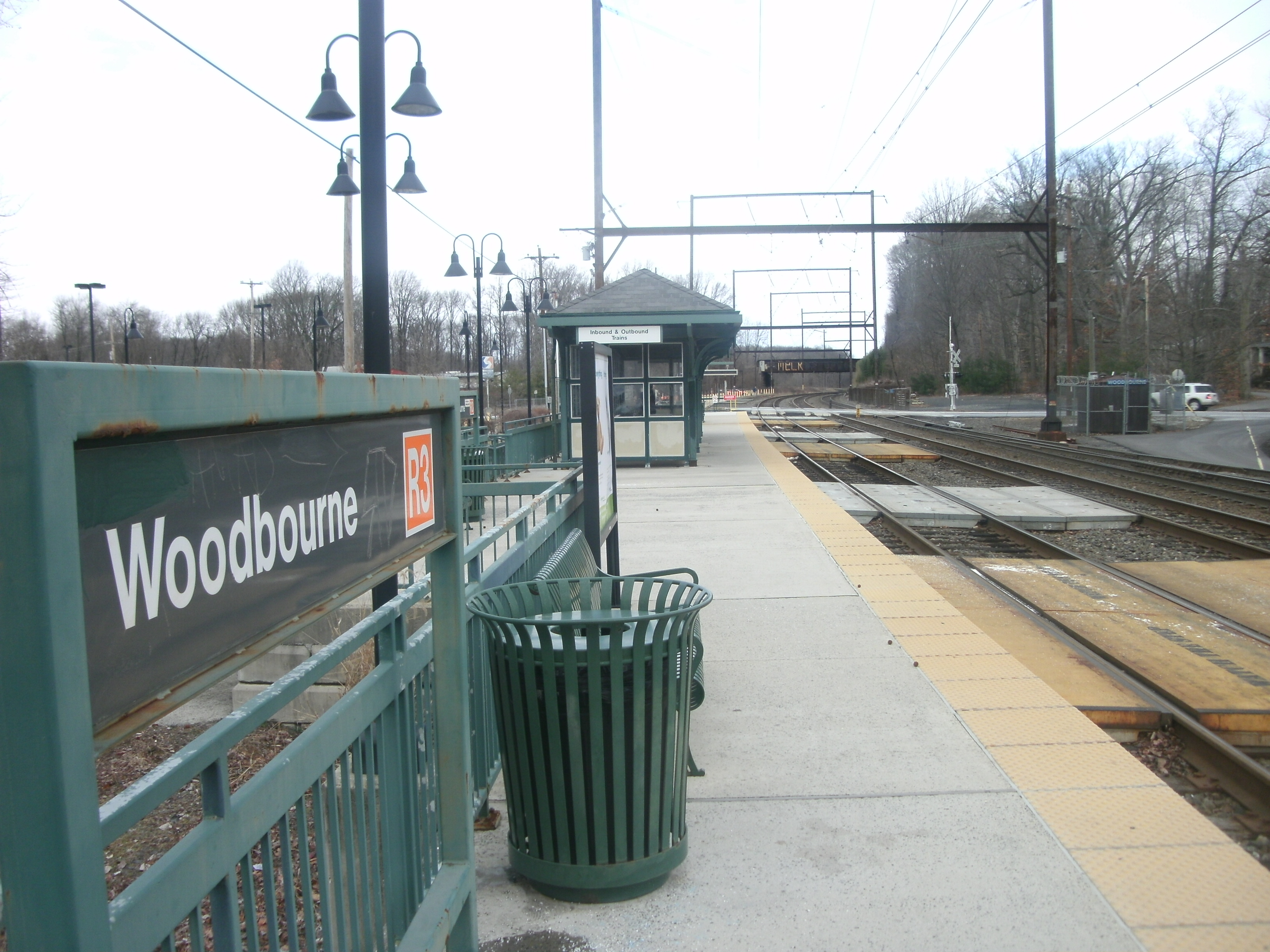
- Woodbourne station

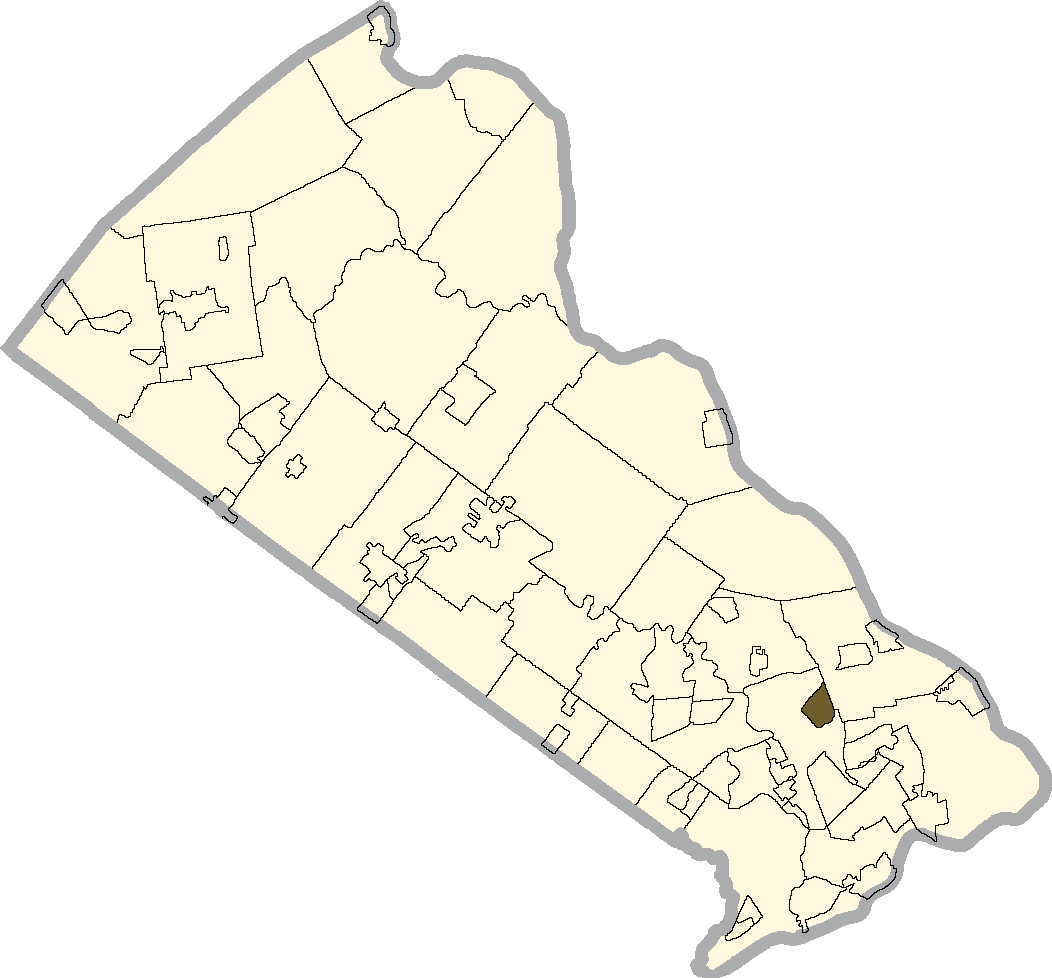
- Location of Woodbourne in Bucks County

- Location of Woodbourne in Pennsylvania Woodbourne (the United States)
- Coordinates: 40°12′08″N 74°53′20″W
- Country: United States
- State: Pennsylvania
- County: Bucks
- Township: Middletown

Area
  - Total: 1.2 sq mi (3.1 km^{2})
  - Land: 1.2 sq mi (3.1 km^{2})
  - Water: 0.0 sq mi (0 km^{2})
- Elevation: 174 ft (53 m)

Population (2010)
  - Total: 3,851
  - Density: 3,200/sq mi (1,200/km^{2})
- Time zone: UTC-5 (EST)
  - Summer (DST): UTC-4 (EDT)
- Area codes: 215, 267, and 445

Woodbourne is a census-designated place (CDP) in Bucks County, Pennsylvania, United States. The population was 3,851 at the 2010 census.

== Geography ==
Woodbourne is located at 40°12′8″N 74°53′20″W (40.202319, -74.888825).

According to the United States Census Bureau, the CDP has a total area of 1.2 square miles (3.2 km^{2}), all land.

== Demographics ==
Historical population
Census	Pop.	Note	%±
1990	2,953		—
2000	3,512		18.9%
2010	3,851		9.7%
2020	3,710		−3.7%

=== 2020 census ===
As of the 2020 census, Woodbourne had a population of 3,710. The median age was 43.2 years. 19.9% of residents were under the age of 18 and 16.6% of residents were 65 years of age or older. For every 100 females there were 100.2 males, and for every 100 females age 18 and over there were 100.7 males age 18 and over.

100.0% of residents lived in urban areas, while 0.0% lived in rural areas.

There were 1,367 households in Woodbourne, of which 31.2% had children under the age of 18 living in them. Of all households, 71.6% were married-couple households, 11.6% were households with a male householder and no spouse or partner present, and 13.2% were households with a female householder and no spouse or partner present. About 15.7% of all households were made up of individuals and 5.3% had someone living alone who was 65 years of age or older.

There were 1,441 housing units, of which 5.1% were vacant. The homeowner vacancy rate was 0.4% and the rental vacancy rate was 15.9%.

Racial composition as of the 2020 census
Race	Number	Percent
White	3,127	84.3%
Black or African American	122	3.3%
American Indian and Alaska Native	5	0.1%
Asian	247	6.7%
Native Hawaiian and Other Pacific Islander	1	0.0%
Some other race	34	0.9%
Two or more races	174	4.7%
Hispanic or Latino (of any race)	129	3.5%

=== 2010 census ===
As of the 2010 census, the population was 88.2% White, 2.4% Black or African American, 0.1% Native American, 5.9% Asian, 0.1% Native Hawaiian or Other Pacific Islander, and 1.0% were two or more races. 2.4% of the population were of Hispanic or Latino ancestry.

=== 2000 census ===
At the 2000 census there were 3,512 people, 1,008 households, and 955 families living in the CDP. The population density was 2,882.1 inhabitants per square mile (1,112.8/km^{2}). There were 1,008 housing units at an average density of 827.2 per square mile (319.4/km^{2}). The racial makeup of the CDP was 93.65% White, 1.88% African American, 3.19% Asian, 0.03% Pacific Islander, 0.20% from other races, and 1.05% from two or more races. Hispanic or Latino of any race were 1.48%.

There were 1,008 households, 62.9% had children under the age of 18 living with them, 87.8% were married couples living together, 4.9% had a female householder with no husband present, and 5.2% were non-families. 3.5% of households were made up of individuals, and 0.9% were one person aged 65 or older. The average household size was 3.48 and the average family size was 3.58.

The age distribution was 35.7% under the age of 18, 6.3% from 18 to 24, 27.5% from 25 to 44, 27.6% from 45 to 64, and 2.9% 65 or older. The median age was 36 years. For every 100 females, there were 102.1 males. For every 100 females age 18 and over, there were 98.5 males.

The median household income was $107,913 and the median family income was $109,739. Males had a median income of $72,188 versus $46,607 for females. The per capita income for the CDP was $33,821. None of the population or families were below the poverty line.
