= Harewood and Beechwood =

Historic house in Pennsylvania, United States

- U.S. National Register of Historic Places
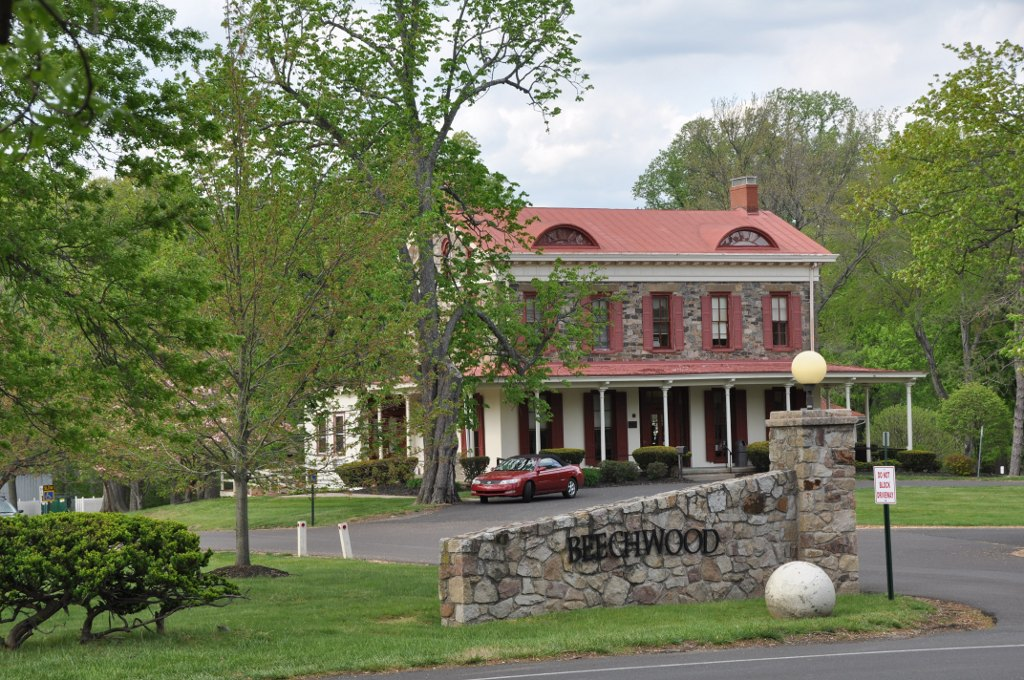
- Beechwood, April 2012

- Location within Pennsylvania Location within the United States
- Location: East of Langhorne off Pennsylvania Route 213, Middletown Township, Pennsylvania
- Coordinates: 40°10′43″N 74°54′45″W
- Area: 2.5 acres (1.0 ha)
- Built: c. 1788, 1853, 1906
- Built by: Mercer, Henry
- NRHP reference No.: 80003436
- Added to NRHP: February 1, 1980

Harewood and Beechwood, also known as Woods School, are two historic homes which are located roughly four miles apart in Middletown Township, Bucks County, Pennsylvania.

The school was added to the National Register of Historic Places in 1980.

== History and architectural features ==
Harewood was originally built as a farmhouse sometime around 1788. The original structure is located behind the main house that was erected in 1906. Harewood is an irregularly shaped, multi-level dwelling with a five-story main section, which has a broken-hipped roof and features Palladian windows.

Beechwood was built in 1853, and is a large 2 1/2-story, fieldstone dwelling with a gable roof. It has a two-story, stuccoed stone rear addition. Both houses were built as country mansions and later acquired as a school for children with disabilities. Harewood was acquired in 1924 and Beechwood in 1944. Together, they became known as the Woods School.
