= Oxford Valley, Pennsylvania =

Unincorporated community in Pennsylvania, US

- Unincorporated community
- Location within Pennsylvania Location within the United States
- Coordinates: 40°10′52″N 74°51′59″W
- Country: United States
- State: Pennsylvania
- County: Bucks
- Township: Falls
- Elevation: 125 ft (38 m)
- Time zone: UTC-5 (Eastern (EST))
  - Summer (DST): UTC-4 (EDT)
- Area codes: 215, 267 and 445
- GNIS feature ID: 1183168

Oxford Valley is an unincorporated community in Falls Township in Bucks County, Pennsylvania, United States.

It was once small village of about 25 farm houses, a general store and post office prior to the Mall construction. It's believed the village of Oxford was settled around 1796.

Oxford Valley is located near the intersection of U.S. Route 1 Business and Oxford Valley Road. The Oxford Valley Mall and Sesame Place amusement park are located nearby.
