= Burlington County Bridge Commission =

Agency overview
- Formed: 1948
- Jurisdiction: Burlington County, New Jersey
- Headquarters: 1300 Route 73 North, Palmyra, NJ 08065
- Agency executives: John B. Comegno, II, Chairman; James D. Fattorini, Vice Chairman; Troy E. Singleton, Commissioner
- Website: http://www.bcbridges.org/

The Burlington County Bridge Commission is a public agency responsible for the operation and maintenance of several bridges in Burlington County, New Jersey, United States, across the Delaware River. It now manages eight bridges, including the Tacony-Palmyra Bridge, the Burlington-Bristol Bridge, and the Riverside-Delanco Bridge. Minor bridges operated by the Commission are the Pennsauken Creek Bridge, Pompeston Creek Bridge, Route 73 Overpass, Swede Run Bridge, and the Twin Pipe Culvert, all along County Route 543.

Tolls are collected in New Jersey for traffic heading towards Pennsylvania at the Tacony-Palmyra and Burlington-Bristol Bridges. No tolls are collected for traffic crossing into New Jersey. Tolls range from $3 (EZPass)/$4 (cash) for two-axle cars, vans, light pick-up trucks, and motorcycles, up to $22.50 for five-axle trucks. E-ZPass is accepted for toll payments. Tolls were increased on September 15, 2015. Two-Axle cars are $3.00 with EZPass / $4.00 cash.

A total of $51 million in revenue was generated from the 13.5 million toll-paying trips in 2016 on the Burlington–Bristol and Tacony–Palmyra bridges.

== History ==
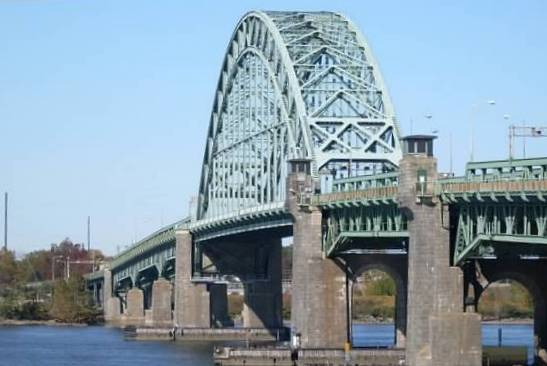
View of Tacony-Palmyra Bridge between Palmyra, NJ and Philadelphia, PA

The Burlington County Board of Chosen Freeholders created the Burlington County Bridge Commission on October 22, 1948. It simultaneously approved the Commission's purchase of the Burlington-Bristol and Tacony-Palmyra Bridges from a private company.

In 1962, the Commission built a single-span bridge over Route 73 and a multi-span bridge over Pennsauken Creek, on River Road.

In 1966, the Commission became responsible for almost seven miles of roadway on County Route 543 (River Road), from Route 73 in Palmyra to the halfway house in Delran, including the three bridges/structures that crossed over Pompeston Creek, Swede Run and Twin Pipe Culvert. This acquisition also included the movable Riverside-Delanco Bridge across the Rancocas Creek. The Commission agreed to this arrangement with the County because River Road was considered a "feeder road" for both the Burlington-Bristol and Tacony-Palmyra Bridges.

Of the eight bridges, the Commission has one of each of the three standard types of movable bridges. The Tacony-Palmyra Bridge has a double leaf bascule span, the Burlington-Bristol Bridge has a vertical lift span, and the Riverside-Delanco Bridge has a horizontal swing span.
