= Blooming Glen, Pennsylvania =

Unincorporated community in Pennsylvania, US

- Unincorporated community
- Location within Pennsylvania Location within the United States
- Coordinates: 40°22′10″N 75°14′54″W
- Country: United States
- State: Pennsylvania
- County: Bucks
- Township: Hilltown
- Elevation: 410 ft (120 m)
- Time zone: UTC-5 (Eastern (EST))
  - Summer (DST): UTC-4 (EDT)
- ZIP Code: 18911
- Area codes: 215, 267, 445
- GNIS feature ID: 1169845

Blooming Glen is an unincorporated community in Hilltown Township in Bucks County, Pennsylvania, United States.

== History ==
Blooming Glen was once known as "Perkasie" for a very short time. In the 1870s its name was Moyers Store, as that was the name of the post office, John S. Moyer was the postmaster. By the time Moyer died, the name was changed to Blooming Glen. William D. Bishop was appointed the next postmaster.

== Geography ==
Blooming Glen is located at the intersection of Pennsylvania Route 113 and Blooming Glen Road.

== Demographics ==
Historical population
Census	Pop.	Note	%±

The United States Census Bureau defined Blooming Glen as a census designated place (CDP) in 2023.
