= Burlington–Bristol Bridge =

Bridge that crosses the Delaware River

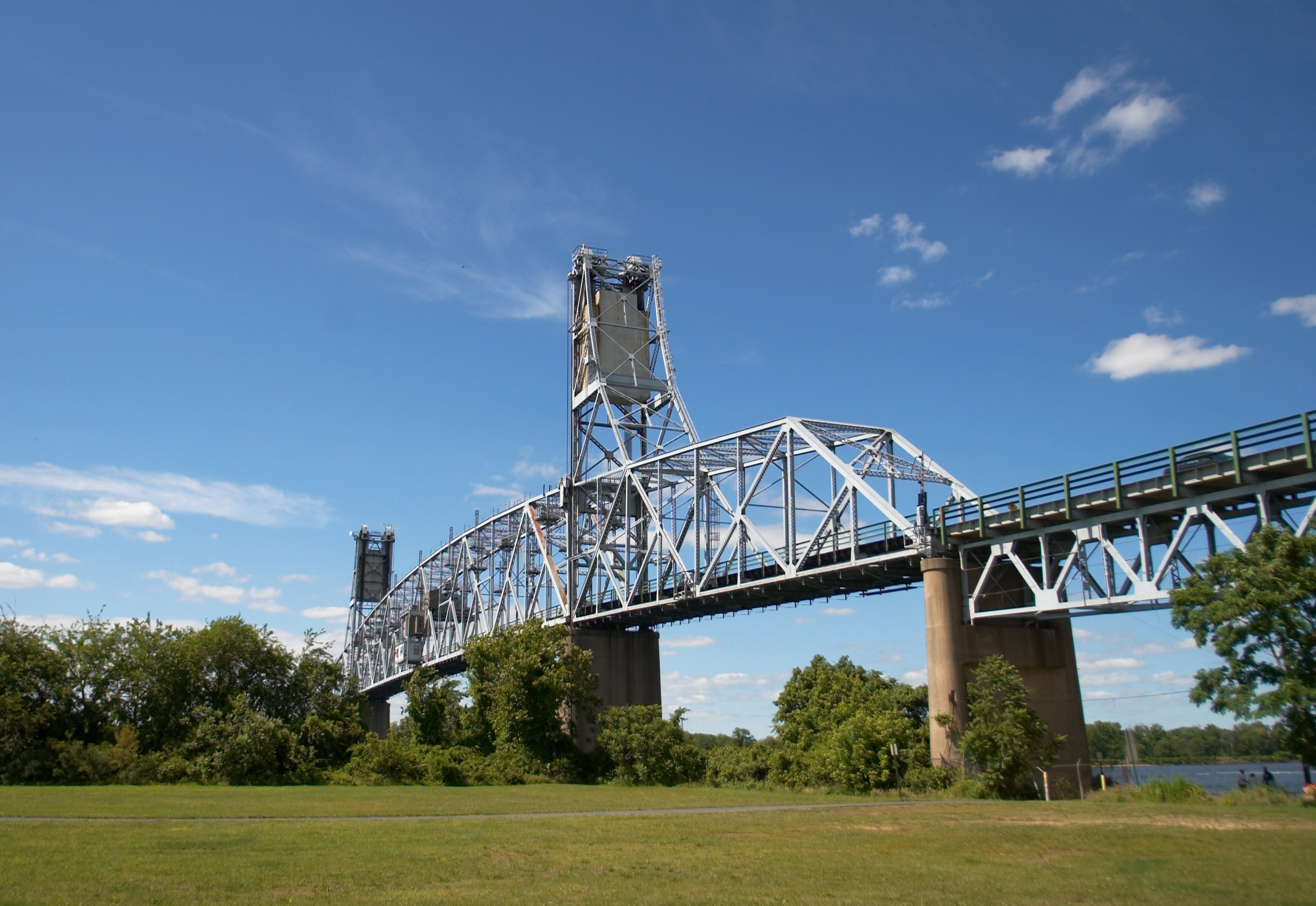
- The Burlington Bristol Bridge from Burlington, New Jersey
- Coordinates: 40°04′53″N 74°52′10.5″W
- Carries: 2 lanes of PA 413 (PA side) / Route 413 (NJ side)
- Crosses: Delaware River
- Locale: Bristol Township, Pennsylvania and Burlington, New Jersey
- Official name: Burlington–Bristol Bridge
- Owner: Burlington County Bridge Commission
- Maintained by: Burlington County Bridge Commission
- ID number: 3000002 (NJ) 097101999100010 (PA)

Characteristics
- Design: vertical lift bridge
- Material: Steel
- Total length: 2,301 feet (701.3 m)
- Width: 20 feet (6.1 m)
- Longest span: 540 feet (165 m)
- Clearance below: 61 feet when closed at high tide to 135 feet (41.1 m) when open

History
- Construction start: April 1930; 95 years ago
- Construction end: May 2, 1931; 93 years ago
- Construction cost: $1.5 million
- Opened: May 2, 1931; 93 years ago

Statistics
- Daily traffic: 25,241 (1992)
- Toll: $4.00 (cash), $3.00 (E-ZPass) northbound

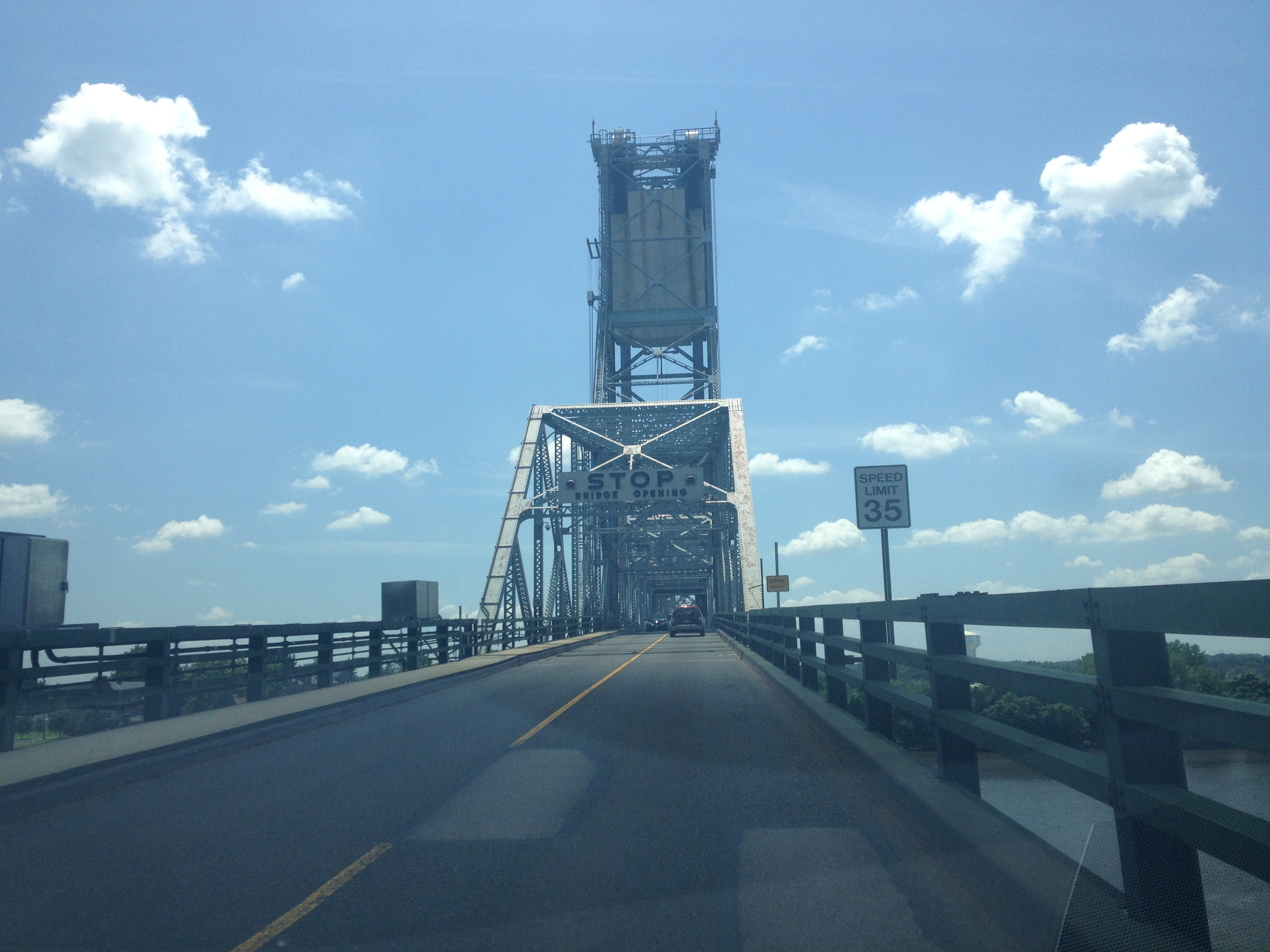
Burlington–Bristol Bridge heading south

The Burlington–Bristol Bridge is a truss bridge with a lift span crossing the Delaware River from Burlington, New Jersey to Bristol Township, Pennsylvania in the United States. Construction of the bridge started on April 1, 1930, and the bridge opened to traffic on May 2, 1931. The bridge carries New Jersey Route 413 and Pennsylvania Route 413 (PA 413).

The two-lane bridge has a total length of 2,301 feet (701 m), and is operated by the Burlington County Bridge Commission. The lift span is 540 feet (164.6 m) long.

The center span is lifted by the action of two large concrete slabs of slightly greater weight than the lifted span, which block traffic when fully down. They are set in downwards motion to lift the bridge by a very slight action of the motors, as gravity does the rest. In 2016, traffic signals and barrier gates were installed at each end of the bridge for stopping traffic when the draw span is being lifted.

A municipal garage is located underneath the rising road after the tollbooths. During times when the bridge is up for a boat passing underneath, large traffic backups are created on Keim Boulevard, the road that functions as the route to the bridge from U.S. Route 130 (US 130) and Broad Street.

The tollbooths are equipped with E-ZPass and the toll as of September 15, 2015 — $4.00 for cars, or $3 with E-ZPass — is paid by vehicles crossing into Pennsylvania.

New bridges for the site have been proposed, but most would require the access ramp to extend out to US 130, which would result in the destruction of historic buildings, as well as the large industrial park near the bridge.

== See also ==
- List of crossings of the Delaware River
