= Oxford Valley Mall =

Shopping mall in Langhorne, Pennsylvania

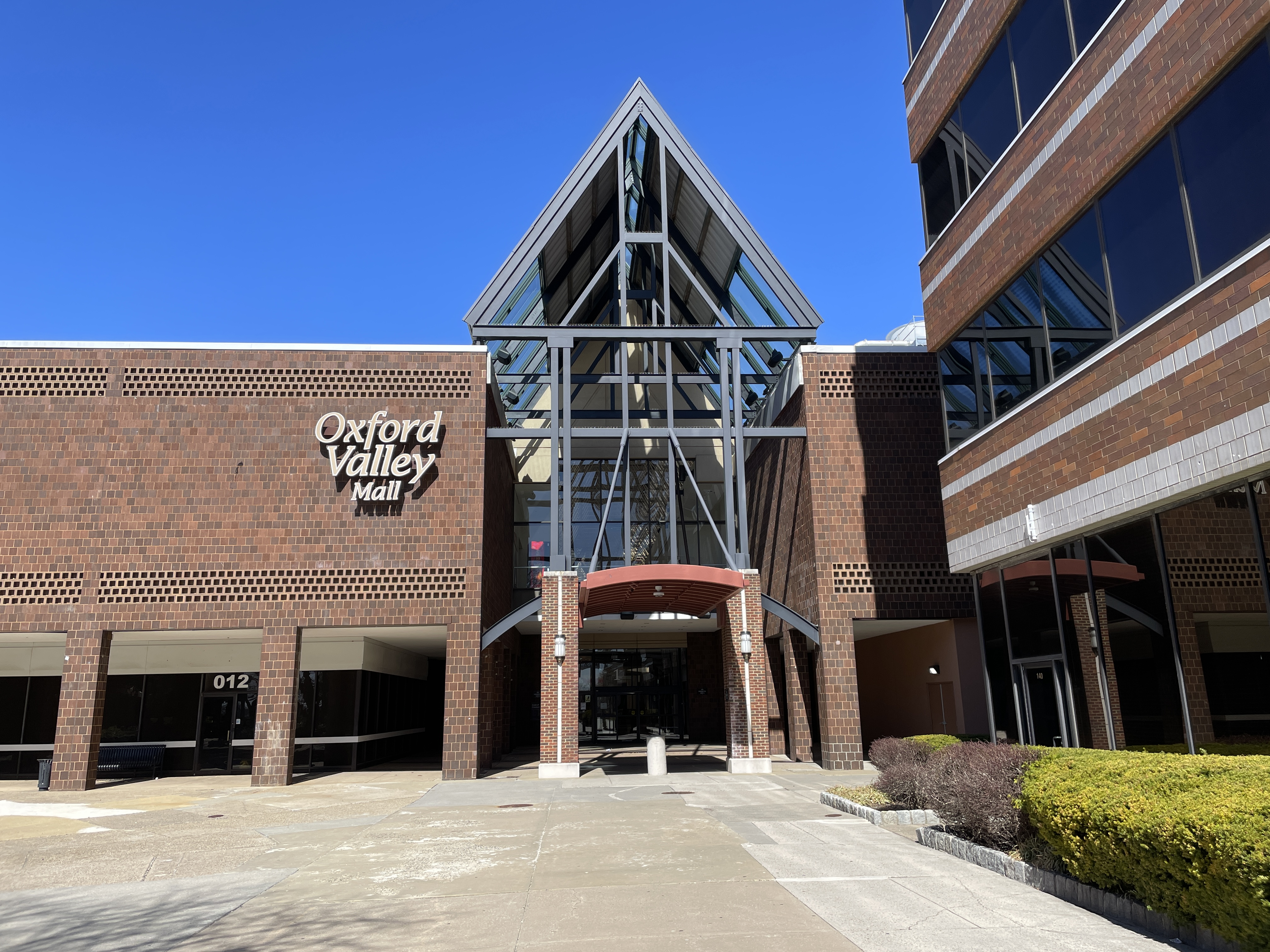
- Entrance to Oxford Valley Mall
- Location: Middletown Township, Pennsylvania, U.S.
- Coordinates: 40.1839°N 74.8807°W
- Opened: August 9, 1973
- Developer: The Kravco Company
- Manager: Simon Property Group
- Owner: Simon Property Group (85.5%)
- Num. of stores: 113
- Num. of anchor tenants: 3 (2 open, 1 vacant)
- Floor area: 1,336,364 square feet (124,152.3 m^{2})
- Floors: 2
- Parking: Parking lot
- Public transit: SEPTA bus: 14, 127, 128, 129
- Website: simon.com/mall/oxford-valley-mall

The Oxford Valley Mall is a two-story shopping mall, managed and 85.5 percent-owned by the Simon Property Group, that is located next to the Sesame Place amusement park near Langhorne in Middletown Township, Bucks County, Pennsylvania. Its department stores are JCPenney and Macy's.

With 111 stores, Oxford Valley Mall is currently the tenth-largest shopping mall in Pennsylvania. There is a food court on the second floor, which was originally the second floor of a Woolworth. An office building called One Oxford Valley is located next to the mall. Newly built luxury apartments, Atlee Square, are located adjacent to the Oxford Valley Mall.

== History ==
=== 20th century ===
Oxford Valley Mall was developed by The Kravco Company and opened in 1973.

In 1986, the Gimbels store was converted to Stern's after Allied Stores purchased seven Gimbels locations in the Philadelphia area. That same year, Bamberger's became Macy's.

In 1989, Sears replaced Stern's after the latter closed several stores in the Philadelphia area. The mall underwent a renovation in 1990.

In 1992, a separate, 10 screen movie theater was added behind Sears (4 new auditoriums were added in 2004). In 1995, the mall opened its food court on the second floor, replacing what had been the second floor of a Woolworth store.

The mall replaced the spiral pedestrian ramp and fountain with a glass-enclosed elevator, upgraded the air conditioning system, and extensively renovated the JCPenney and Sears stores. All fountains were eventually removed with only the outdoor one remaining. The same year, Wanamaker's was converted to Hecht's.

In 1997, Hecht's became Strawbridge's after its parent company, May Department Stores, acquired the Strawbridge's chain.

=== 21st century ===
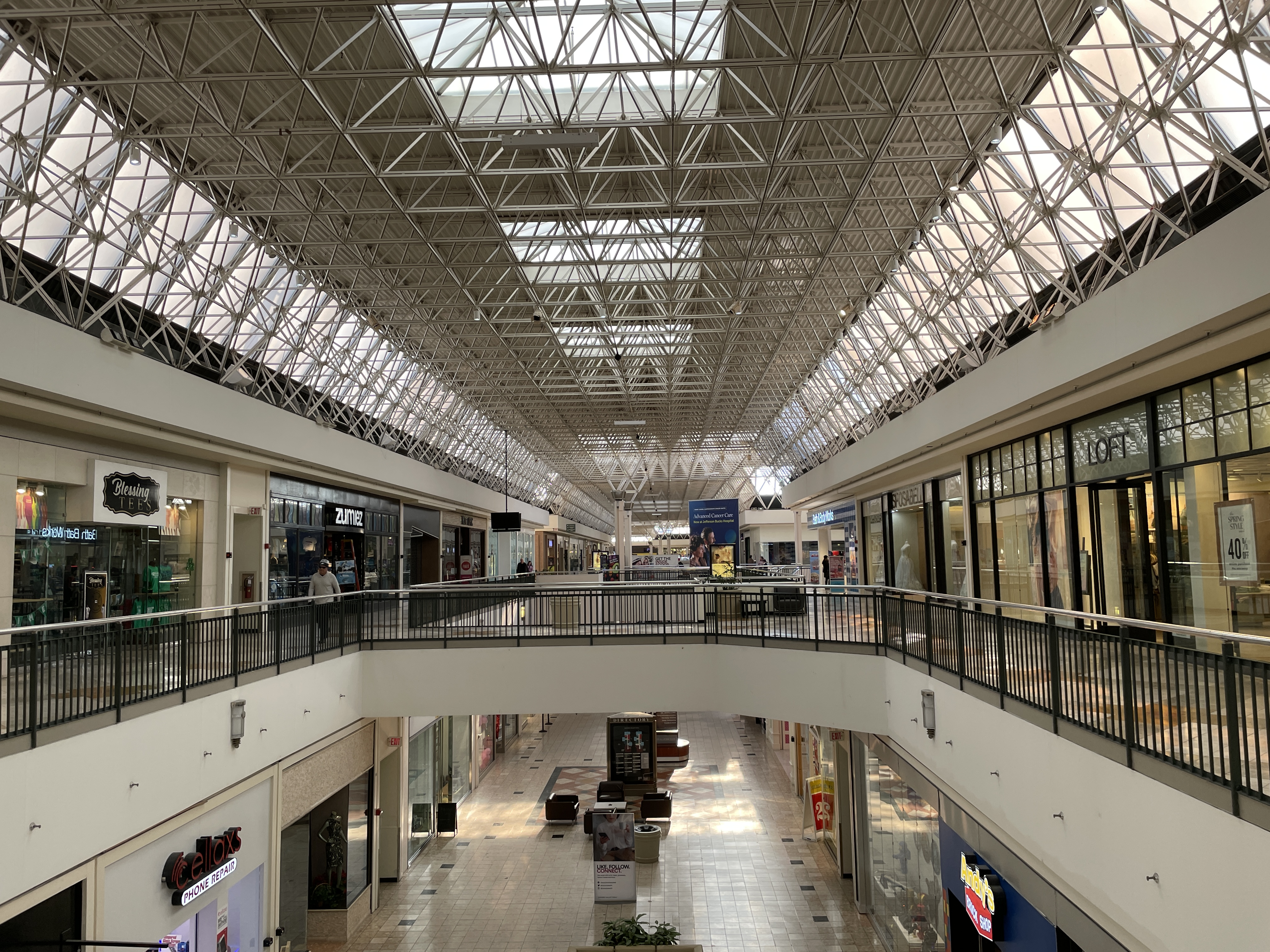
Oxford Valley Mall's second floor seen from Macy's in 2025

In 2006, the Strawbridge's store closed as a result of Federated Department Stores acquiring May Department Stores, with Boscov's taking over the former store.

The Boscov's store closed in 2008 as part of their restructuring. On October 15, 2018, Sears announced that its store would be closing as part of a plan to close 142 stores nationwide as a result of the company filing for Chapter 11 bankruptcy. The store closed on January 7, 2019, leaving Macy's and JCPenney as the only remaining anchor stores open for business.

In August 2019, a local news agency reported that Simon Property Group and multiple other related entities have proposed a plan to redevelop the mall and the surrounding property into a mixed use center, including the addition of a 600 unit high-end apartment complex in place of the former Wanamaker's and Boscov's anchor that would include studio to 2 bedroom units, a fitness center, indoor and outdoor common spaces, dog park, pools, full-time management, maintenance, and concierge services like dog walking on site. Other possible additions include new eateries, a lifestyle complex, new retailers, and refreshed office space. According to sources, an area of the parking lot will be used for the possible developments.

In December 2022, the long-vacant Wanamaker's and Boscov's anchor building was demolished to make way for future redevelopment.

In August 2024, the Atlee Square apartments, featuring 391 units, began to accept leasing applications. These luxury apartments were eventually all finished on the former Wanamaker’s and Boscov’s anchor building site and opened.
