= Maple Beach, Pennsylvania =

Unincorporated community in Pennsylvania, US

- Unincorporated community
- Location within Pennsylvania
- Coordinates: 40°5′10″N 74°52′8″W
- Country: United States
- State: Pennsylvania
- County: Bucks
- Township: Bristol
- Elevation: 10 ft (3.0 m)
- Time zone: UTC-5 (Eastern (EST))
  - Summer (DST): UTC-4 (EDT)
- ZIP Code: 19007
- Area codes: 215, 267 and 445
- GNIS feature ID: 1180314

Maple Beach is an unincorporated community in Bristol Township in Bucks County, Pennsylvania, United States. Maple Beach is located along the Delaware River at the Pennsylvania approach to the Burlington-Bristol Bridge. In 1917, Rohm and Haas purchased the residential properties in Maple Beach as part of an expansion of industrial activities in the area. Four homes remained in Maple Beach as of 2013. As of June 13, 2020, large signs at the north entrance indicated that the land is private property owned by Dow Chemical Company and trespassing would be prosecuted.
