= Core Creek =

Core Creek may refer to:

- Core Creek (Osage Fork Gasconade River), a tributary of the Osage Fork Gasconade River in Laclede County, Missouri
- Core Creek, Carteret County, North Carolina, a populated place in Carteret County, North Carolina
- Core Creek (Neuse River), at tributary of the Neuse River in Craven County, North Carolina
- Core Creek (Newport River), North Carolina, a bay of the estuary of the Newport River
- Core Creek (Neshaminy Creek), Pennsylvania, a tributary of the Neshaminy Creek
- Core Creek Park, a county park in Middletown Township, Bucks County, Pennsylvania
