= Newtown Creek (disambiguation) =

Newtown Creek may refer to:

== Streams ==
=== United States ===
- California
  - Newtown Creek is a tributary of Churn Creek in Shasta County, California.
- New York
  - Newtown Creek is a tributary of the East River in New York City, New York.
- Pennsylvania
  - Newtown Creek is a tributary of the Neshaminy Creek in Bucks County, Pennsylvania.

== See also ==
Related to the New York City creek:

- Newtown Creek Wastewater Treatment Plant
- Newtown Creek Oil Spill

Related to the Pennsylvania creek:

- Newtown Creek Bridge
