= Tyler State Park (Pennsylvania) =

State park in Bucks County, Pennsylvania

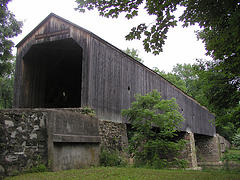
- Schofield Ford Covered Bridge

- Location within Pennsylvania Location within the United States
- Interactive map of Tyler State Park
- Location: Bucks County, Pennsylvania, United States
- Coordinates: 40°13′52″N 74°57′11″W
- Area: 1,711 acres (692 ha)
- Elevation: 236 feet (72 m)
- Established: 1974
- Administrator: Pennsylvania Department of Conservation and Natural Resources
- Named for: Mr. and Mrs. George F. Tyler
- Website: Official website
- Pennsylvania State Parks
- Twining Ford Covered Bridge
- Formerly listed on the U.S. National Register of Historic Places
- Nearest city: Newtown, Pennsylvania
- Area: 0.1 acres (0.040 ha)
- Architectural style: Town truss
- MPS: Covered Bridges of the Delaware River Watershed TR
- NRHP reference No.: 80003439

Significant dates
- Added to NRHP: December 1, 1980
- Removed from NRHP: June 1, 1994

Tyler State Park is a day-use Pennsylvania state park on 1,711 acres (692 ha) in Newtown and Northampton Townships, Bucks County, Pennsylvania, United States.

Park roads, trails, and facilities are nestled within the original farm and woodland setting. Neshaminy Creek meanders through the park (no swimming), north to south. Tyler State Park is home to many different species of birds thank to the diversity of habitats, including mature forests and maintained grassland. The creek is home to water snakes, turtles, eels, and panfishes. The quieter sections of the park are home to foxes, deer, beavers, racoons, rabbits, and coyotes.

Tyler State Park contains a 36-hole disc golf course, a community theater, an art center, several picnic areas, a children's playground, and many miles of hiking and walking trails. One of the main attractions in the park is the Schofield Ford Covered Bridge, originally built in 1874. The bridge burned down due to arson on October 7, 1991, but was rebuilt with raised funds and reopened on September 7, 1997.

== History ==
For thousands of years, the land that is now Tyler State Park was occupied by the Lenape. The Lenape lived in small villages along the Neshaminy Creek, where they raised crops and practiced agroforestry.

Tradition states that during the Treaty of Shackamaxon, possibly in 1682, William Penn began formal relations with the Lenape and afterward, land transfers to European colonists. Early in the 18th century, European colonists farmed the land. Families including the Coopers, Blakers, and Twinings built mills, houses, and barns. Neshaminy Creek supplied power for several mills, including Cooper Mill and Spring Garden Mill. The paved trails in Tyler State Park were once farm roads. Mill Dairy Trail connected Spring Garden Mill and the Thompson Dairy, and Stable Mill Trail went to the Tyler Stables. The original stone homes in the park are fine examples of early rural Pennsylvania farm dwellings. The farmhouses date from the 18th and 19th centuries and are leased as private residences in the modern time. There are currently 14 structures left from the original 21 estates. Some of the original barns, such as Buckman barn in the southeast corner, are used by the park maintenance and operations.

The farmland was later purchased by Mr. George Tyler, a wealthy Philadelphia banker, and Stella Elkins Tyler, an artist, and between 1919 and 1929. Their first purchase was the Solly Farm where the Solly House served as the Tylers' country home until the George F. Tyler Mansion was constructed. The mansion is now the administration building of the Bucks County Community College. The Solly House was leased as a Hostel from the 1970s to the 1990s, and the larger annex was demolished in 2010.

The Tylers purchased the surrounding land, roughly 2000 acres, in order to preserve it as farmland and keep it from being developed. The Tylers restarted an Ayrshire dairy herd that had been abandoned in 1925, and it operated for 40 more years. In addition, they raised poultry, sheep and pigs, and the croplands were mainly used to supply feed for the livestock. The Tylers upgraded many of the farms with plumbing and electricity, and many of the farmers hired where allotted to stay in the homes rent free. They also built a large stable for their 25 riding horses, workers, and groomers; the Tyler Stables now house the Tyler Center for the Arts.

Stella Tyler left the entire estate to Temple University when she died in 1963. Temple University sold the property a year later to the Commonwealth of Pennsylvania. Land for the park was acquired as part of the Project 70 Land Acquisition and Borrowing Act, with the governor approving the acquisition on November 17, 1964. Bucks County acquired roughly 200 acres of the estate around the mansion and built Bucks County Community College. Tyler State Park was formally dedicated and opened on May 25, 1974.

== Recreation ==
Tyler State Park is a day-use park only, open until sunset, and does not provide overnight facilities or camping. According to the park recreations guide, there are 26.8 miles of paved trails and over 14.5 miles of hiking and equine trails. Tyler State Park does not rent horses for riding but does allow visitors to bring their own horses to ride; horse trailers can be parked at the Covered Bridge lot, No. 1 Lane lot, or Fisherman's parking lot. The designated picnic areas include the Boathouse, Maze, Boardwalk, Hickory Nut, the Upper Plantation pavilion, Lower Plantation, and Mill Dam. There is a children's playground and a large playfield at the Boardwalk area. The Hickory Nut picnic grove, the Upper Plantation pavilion, and Lower Plantation picnic groves are reservable, while all other areas are first-come, first-serve.

Tyler State Park contains a large disc golf course with 36 holes, maintained by the Bucks County Disc Golf Alliance. The course is considered challenging and the BCDGA often hosts tournaments and leagues; participants bring their own discs to play.

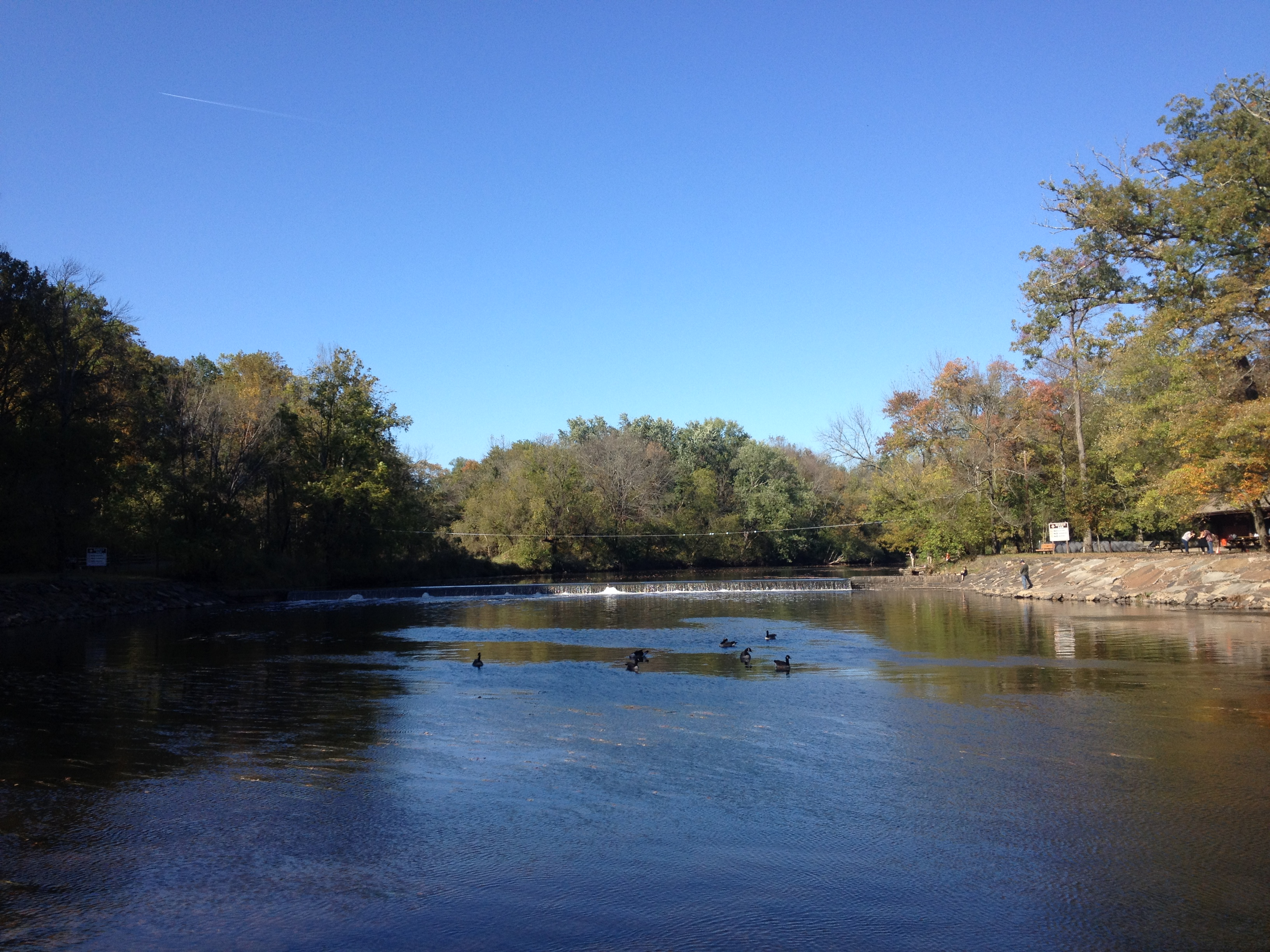
Neshaminy Creek in Tyler State Park

Neshaminy Creek offers calm, easy, non-powered boating upstream from the boat rental. The boat rental operates daily from Memorial Day weekend through Labor Day, weather permitting, and offers paddleboards, kayaks, and canoes. Non-powered boats must display one of the following: boat registration from any state; launch permit or mooring permit from Pennsylvania State Parks, available at most state park offices; launch use permit from the Pennsylvania Fish and Boat Commission. Tyler State Park does not allow swimming in the Neshaminy Creek.

== Tyler Park Center for the Arts ==
The Tyler Park Center for the Arts occupies a building that was once a horse stable for the Tyler family. The barn and surrounding buildings have been converted into artist dwellings, workshops, and studios. The arts center offers classes, workshops, daytime summer camps, and cultural events. The annual Crafts in the Meadow Fall Craft Show helps support the non-profit arts center.

== Climate ==
According to the Trewartha climate classification system, Tyler State Park has a Temperate Continental climate (Dc) with hot summers (a), cold winters (o) and year-around precipitation. Dcao climates are characterized by at least one month having an average mean temperature ≤ 32.0 °F (0 °C), four to seven months with an average mean temperature ≥ 50.0 °F (10 °C), at least one month with an average mean temperature ≥ 72.0 °F (22 °C) and no significant precipitation difference between seasons. Although summers are typically slightly humid at Tyler State Park, episodes of heat and high humidity can occur with heat index values > 108 °F (42 °C). Since 1981, the highest air temperature was 102.8 °F (39 °C) on 07/22/2011, and the highest average mean dew point was 75.2 °F (24 °C) on 08/13/2016. The average wettest month is July which corresponds with the annual peak in thunderstorm activity. Since 1981, the wettest calendar day was 6.46 inches (164 mm) on 08/27/2011. During the winter months, the plant hardiness zone is 7a with an average annual extreme minimum air temperature of 0.5 °F (−18 °C). Since 1981, the coldest air temperature was −10.5 °F (−24 °C) on 01/22/1984. Episodes of extreme cold and wind can occur with wind chill values < −10 °F (−23 °C). The average annual snowfall (Nov-Apr) is between 24 and 30 inches (61 and 76 cm). Ice storms and large snowstorms depositing ≥ 12 inches (30 cm) occur once every few years, particularly during nor’easters from December through February.

Climate data for Tyler State Park. Elevation: 223 ft (68 m). 1981-2010 Averages (1981-2018 Records).
Month	Jan	Feb	Mar	Apr	May	Jun	Jul	Aug	Sep	Oct	Nov	Dec	Year
Record high °F (°C)	71.3 (21.8)	77.6 (25.3)	87.3 (30.7)	94.1 (34.5)	95.0 (35.0)	96.1 (35.6)	102.8 (39.3)	100.2 (37.9)	97.9 (36.6)	89.0 (31.7)	80.8 (27.1)	75.5 (24.2)	102.8 (39.3)
Mean daily maximum °F (°C)	40.1 (4.5)	43.2 (6.2)	51.5 (10.8)	63.6 (17.6)	73.2 (22.9)	82.3 (27.9)	86.6 (30.3)	84.9 (29.4)	78.0 (25.6)	66.7 (19.3)	55.6 (13.1)	44.4 (6.9)	64.3 (17.9)
Daily mean °F (°C)	31.7 (−0.2)	34.4 (1.3)	41.8 (5.4)	52.5 (11.4)	62.0 (16.7)	71.5 (21.9)	76.1 (24.5)	74.6 (23.7)	67.4 (19.7)	55.7 (13.2)	46.0 (7.8)	36.2 (2.3)	54.3 (12.4)
Mean daily minimum °F (°C)	23.3 (−4.8)	25.5 (−3.6)	32.1 (0.1)	41.5 (5.3)	50.8 (10.4)	60.7 (15.9)	65.7 (18.7)	64.2 (17.9)	56.8 (13.8)	44.7 (7.1)	36.5 (2.5)	28.0 (−2.2)	44.2 (6.8)
Record low °F (°C)	−10.5 (−23.6)	−2.7 (−19.3)	3.4 (−15.9)	17.8 (−7.9)	34.2 (1.2)	42.1 (5.6)	48.3 (9.1)	42.9 (6.1)	35.9 (2.2)	25.1 (−3.8)	12.1 (−11.1)	−0.8 (−18.2)	−10.5 (−23.6)
Average precipitation inches (mm)	3.55 (90)	2.77 (70)	4.12 (105)	3.97 (101)	4.33 (110)	4.35 (110)	5.24 (133)	4.37 (111)	4.43 (113)	3.80 (97)	3.65 (93)	4.05 (103)	48.63 (1,235)
Average relative humidity (%)	65.6	62.2	57.8	57.2	61.5	65.4	66.0	68.1	69.3	68.5	67.4	67.3	64.7
Average dew point °F (°C)	21.5 (−5.8)	22.8 (−5.1)	28.0 (−2.2)	37.8 (3.2)	48.6 (9.2)	59.3 (15.2)	63.9 (17.7)	63.4 (17.4)	57.0 (13.9)	45.5 (7.5)	35.8 (2.1)	26.4 (−3.1)	42.6 (5.9)
Source: PRISM

== Ecology ==
According to the A. W. Kuchler U.S. potential natural vegetation types, Tyler State Park would have dominant vegetation type of Appalachian Oak (104) with a dominant vegetation form of Eastern Hardwood Forest (25). The forested areas have been impacted by invasive insects like the emerald ash beetle and the spotted lanternfly.

The management directive for Tyler State Park includes allowing for some of the land to be leased as farmland; however, there are also acers set aside as maintained pollinator meadows and warm season grasslands, which are mowed once per year. Some of the meadows are maintained and researched by the Bucks County Community College STEM department.

== Neshaminy Creek watershed ==
The Neshaminy Creek flows through the middle of Tyler State Park and connects to the Delaware River a few miles downstream near Neshaminy State Park. The creek is home to many warm water species including bluegill, black crappie, carp, smallmouth bass, and various other panfishes. The creek and associated waters also offers habitat for Eastern Water Snakes, box turtles, and many amphibians. Neshaminy Creek provides excellent catch-and-release fishing opportunities. Anglers may fish along the banks or from a canoe or kayak. Pennsylvania Fish and Boat Commission regulations and laws apply.

Tyler State Park does not allow visitors to swim in Neshaminy Creek, as per DCNR rules and regulations. However, activities such as fishing and kayaking are permitted.

=== Pollution concerns ===
The Neshaminy Creek basin in Bucks and Montgomery counties has tested as "extremely high" for levels of Perfluorooctane Sulfonate (PFOS). For this reason the Pennsylvania Department of Agriculture (PDA), Department of Environmental Protection (DEP), and Department of Health (DOH), along with the Pennsylvania Fish and Boat Commission (PAFB), announced a “DO NOT EAT” advisory for all fish species caught in the Neshaminy Creek. The main source of pollution occurs from a military site upstream, now considered a superfund site.

The Pennsylvania Fish and Boat Commission had previously stocked trout in several locations along Neshaminy Creek, including Tyler State Park, but has now stopped due to the contamination. In a press release, DEP Secretary Patrick McDonnell has said, "An advisory like this is not something that we recommend lightly. The possible PFOS levels found in fish tissue is greatly concerning. DEP will continue to sample fish species and revisit this recommendation in the future." PFOS are considered persistent and there are currently no plans for stocking fish in this watershed again.
