= George F. Tyler Mansion =

Historic house in Pennsylvania, United States

- U.S. National Register of Historic Places
- U.S. Historic district
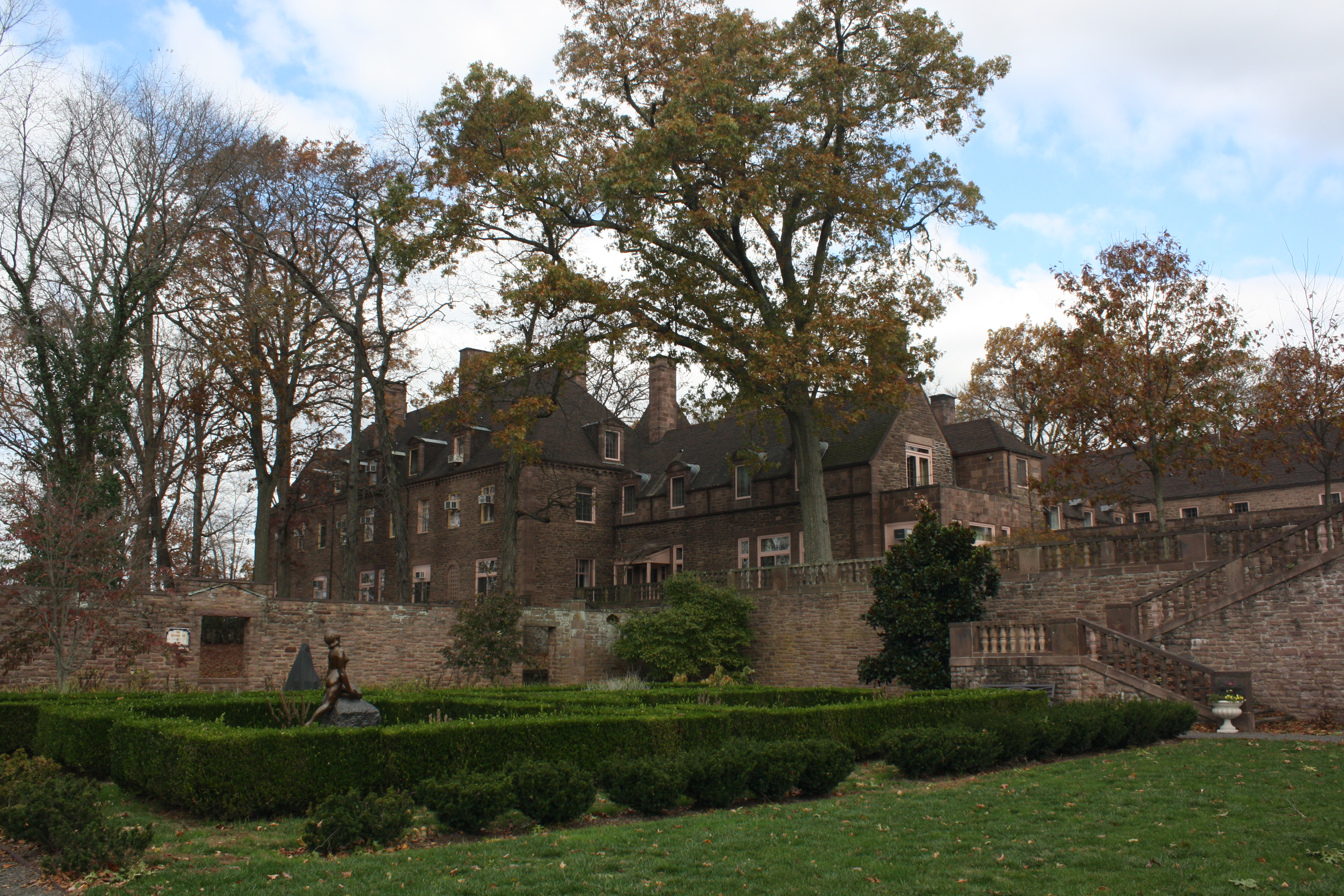
- George F. Tyler Mansion. November 2012.

- Location within Pennsylvania Location within the United States
- Location: W side of Swamp Rd./PA 313, Newtown Township, Pennsylvania
- Coordinates: 40°14′23.3″N 74°58′7.9″W
- Area: 4 acres (1.6 ha)
- Built: 1930-1931
- Architect: Willing, Sims & Talbutt; Harrison, Mertz & Emlen (landscape design); Henry D. Sleeper (interior design)
- Architectural style: French-Norman
- NRHP reference No.: 87001210
- Added to NRHP: July 16, 1987

The George F. Tyler Mansion (1928–31), also known as "Indian Council Rock," is a French-Norman country house and former estate which is located in Newtown Township, Bucks County, Pennsylvania. Located west of Pennsylvania Route 413 and north of Pennsylvania Route 332, the property is now divided into Tyler State Park and the campus of Bucks County Community College.

== History ==
George Frederick Tyler (1883–1947) was a Philadelphia banker and sportsman. Following his mother's early death, his father, Sidney Frederick Tyler, in 1888 married Ida Amelia Elkins, a daughter of streetcar magnate William Lukens Elkins. Seventeen year later, George married his stepmother's niece, Stella Elkins (1884–1963), a budding sculptor who later studied under Boris Blai. The young couple raised three children in a mansion built for them on the Elkins estate in Elkins Park, Pennsylvania. They donated that mansion to Temple University, and it housed the Stella Elkins Tyler School of Art from 1935 to 2008.

Just after World War I, the Tylers bought a Bucks County farm on the west bank of the Neshaminy Creek. They decided to build a country house on the east bank, and by a decade later had assembled a property of nearly 2,000 acres (810 ha), about 3 square miles. The resulting estate was named for one of its landmarks, "Indian Council Rock," a cliff overlooking the creek, that was reputed to have been a meeting place for the Lenni Lenape tribe. The 60-room main house was designed by architect Charles Willing in 1928, and built, 1930–1931. Constructed of brownstone and 300 feet in length, it is the largest residence ever built in Bucks County.

Mrs. Tyler bequeathed the main house and 200 acres (81 ha) of the estate to Temple University in 1963. This was sold to Bucks County in 1965 to create the campus of Bucks County Community College.

Now known as "Tyler Hall," the mansion – still surrounded by formal gardens, stone walls and fountains – houses the college's administrative offices. It, along with the twin bath houses, a stone building known as "The Orangery," and two contributing sites, comprise a historic district that was added to the National Register of Historic Places in 1987.

== Gallery ==
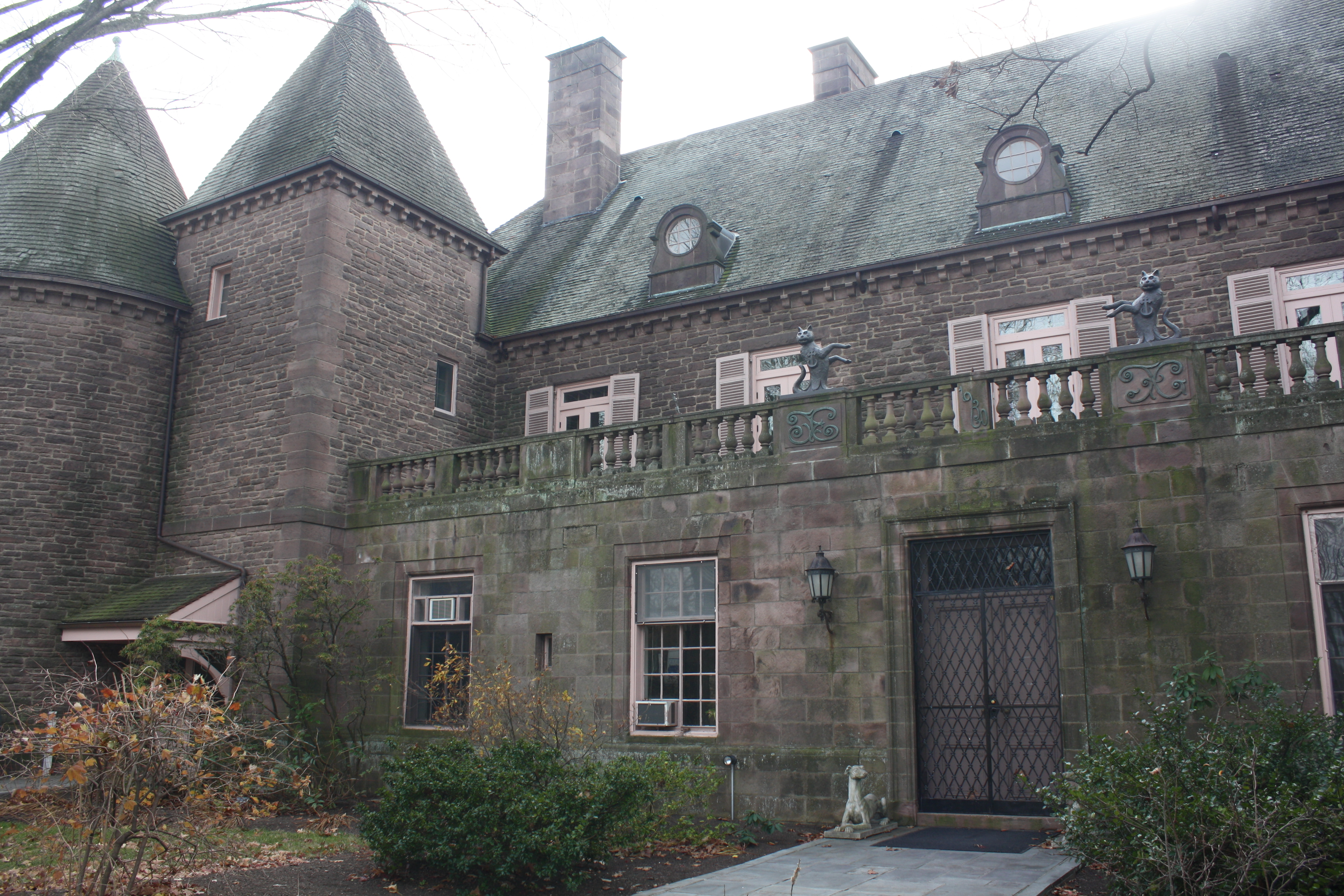
Tyler Mansion.

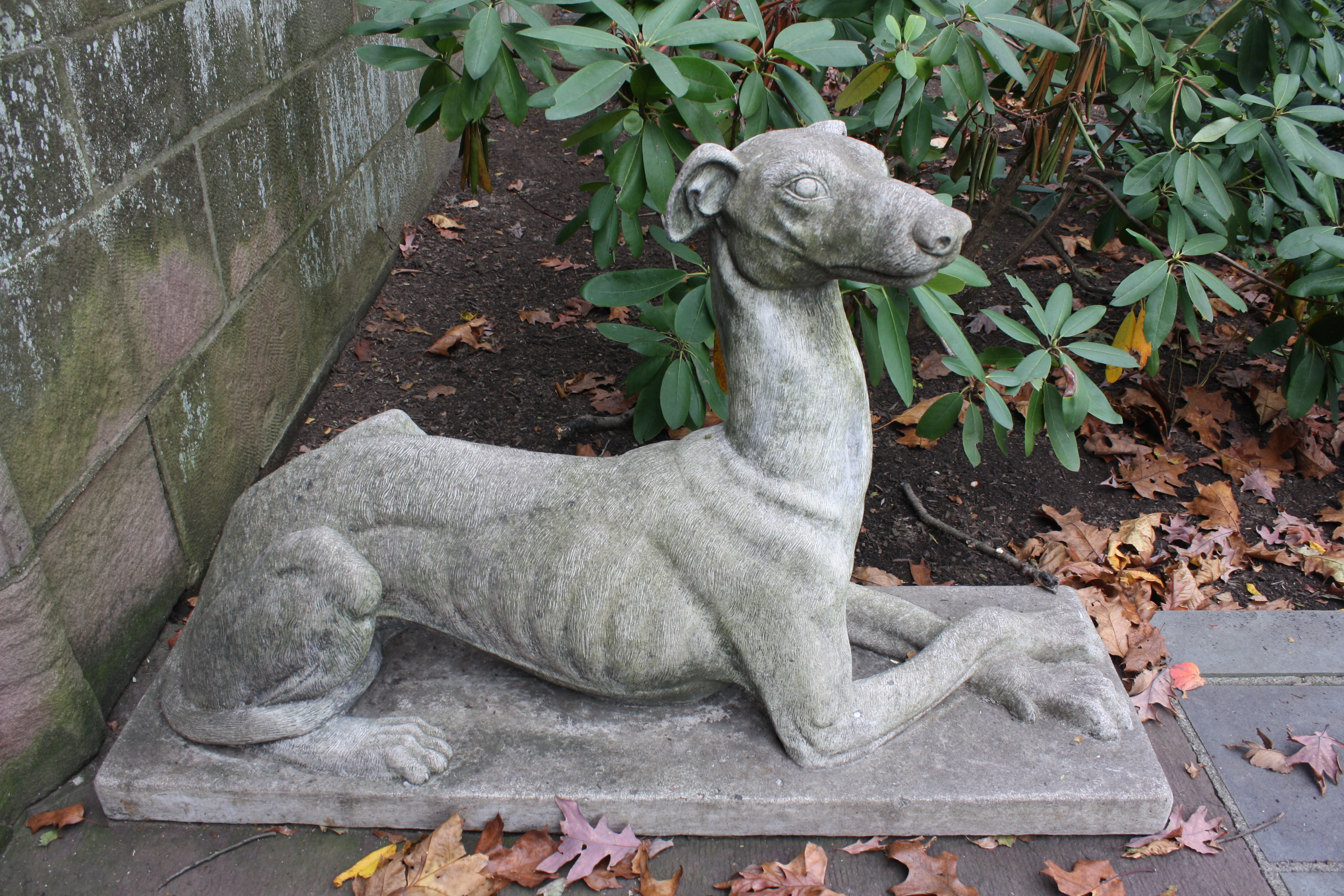
Gate guardian.

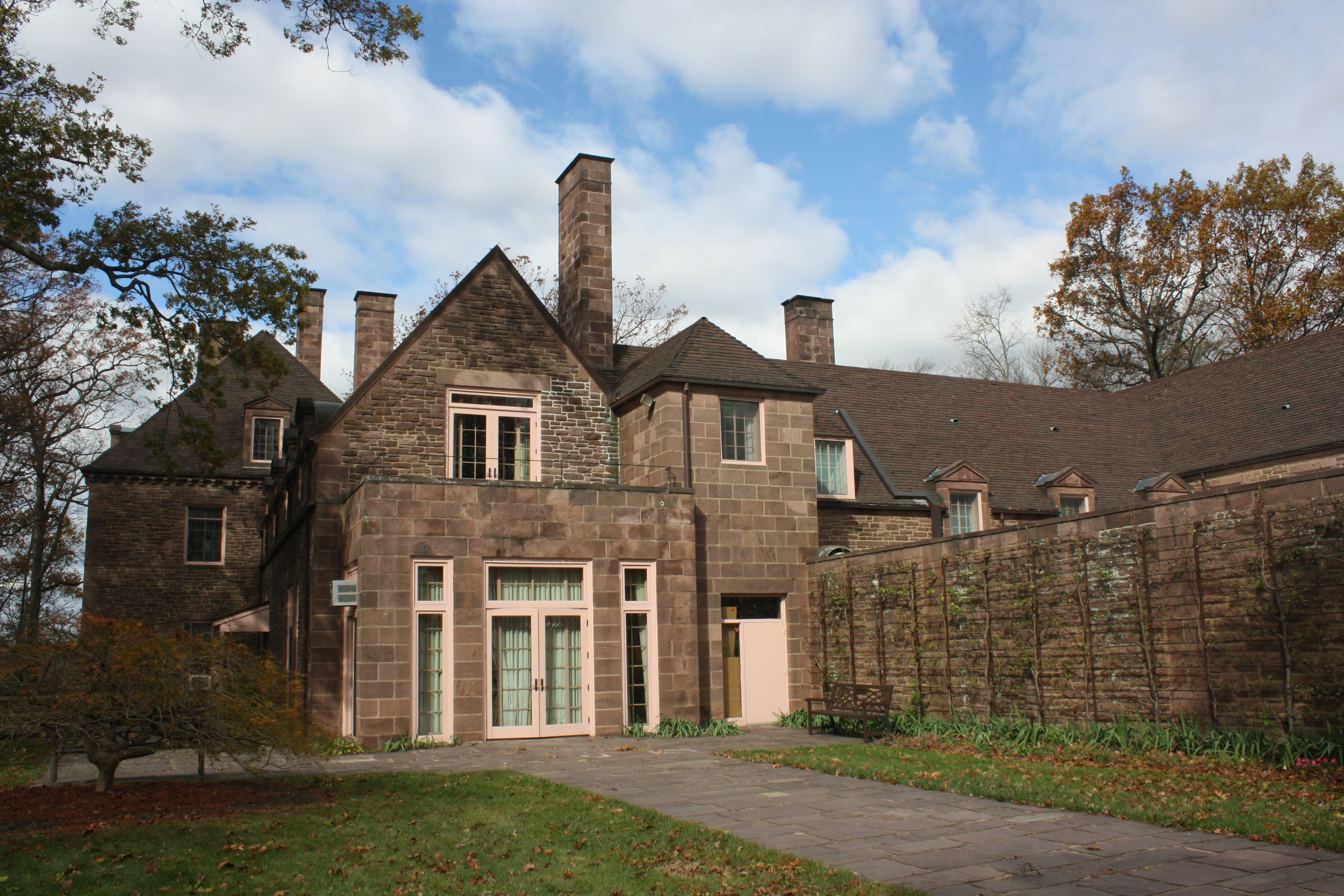
Rear view of the Mansion.

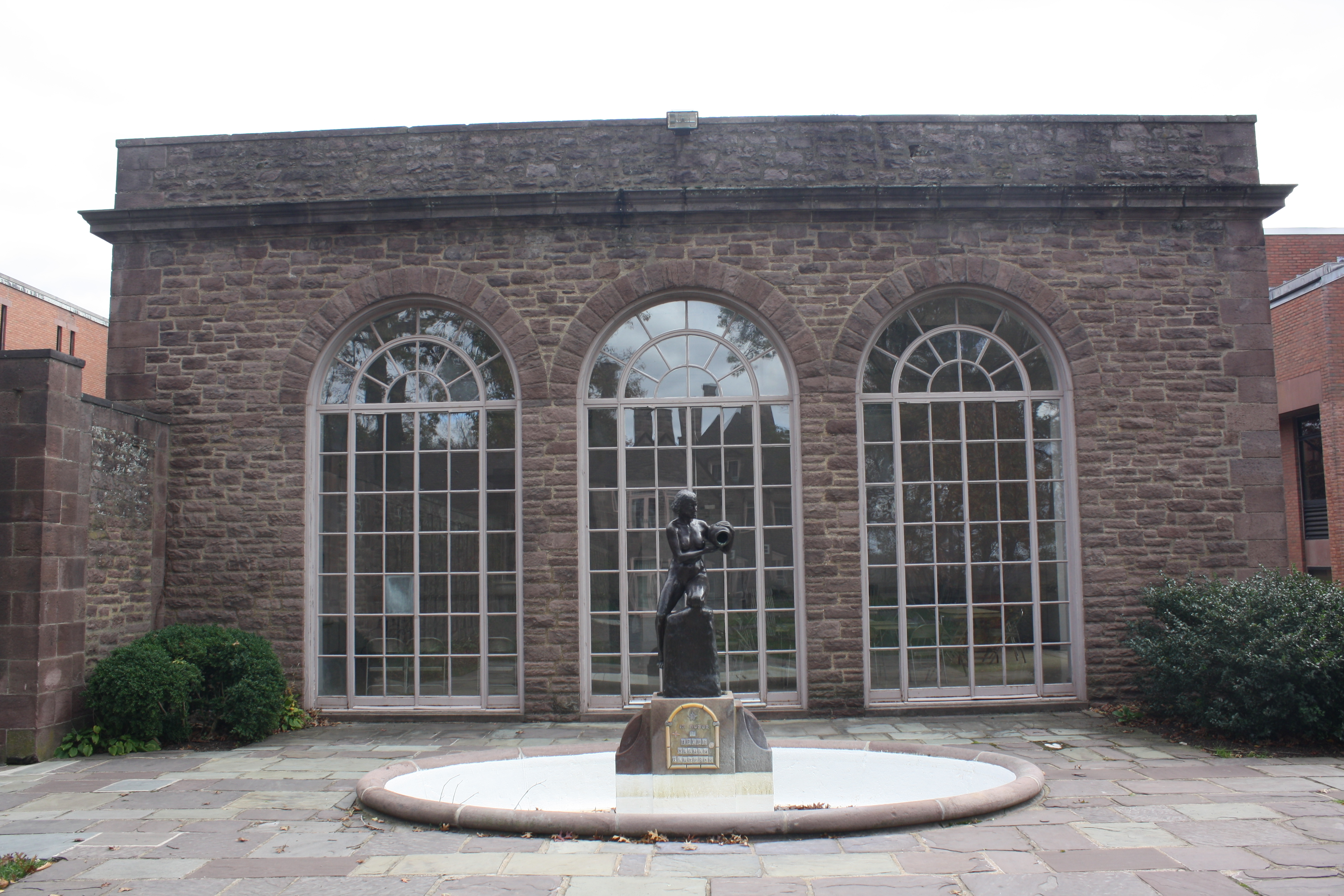
The Orangery.

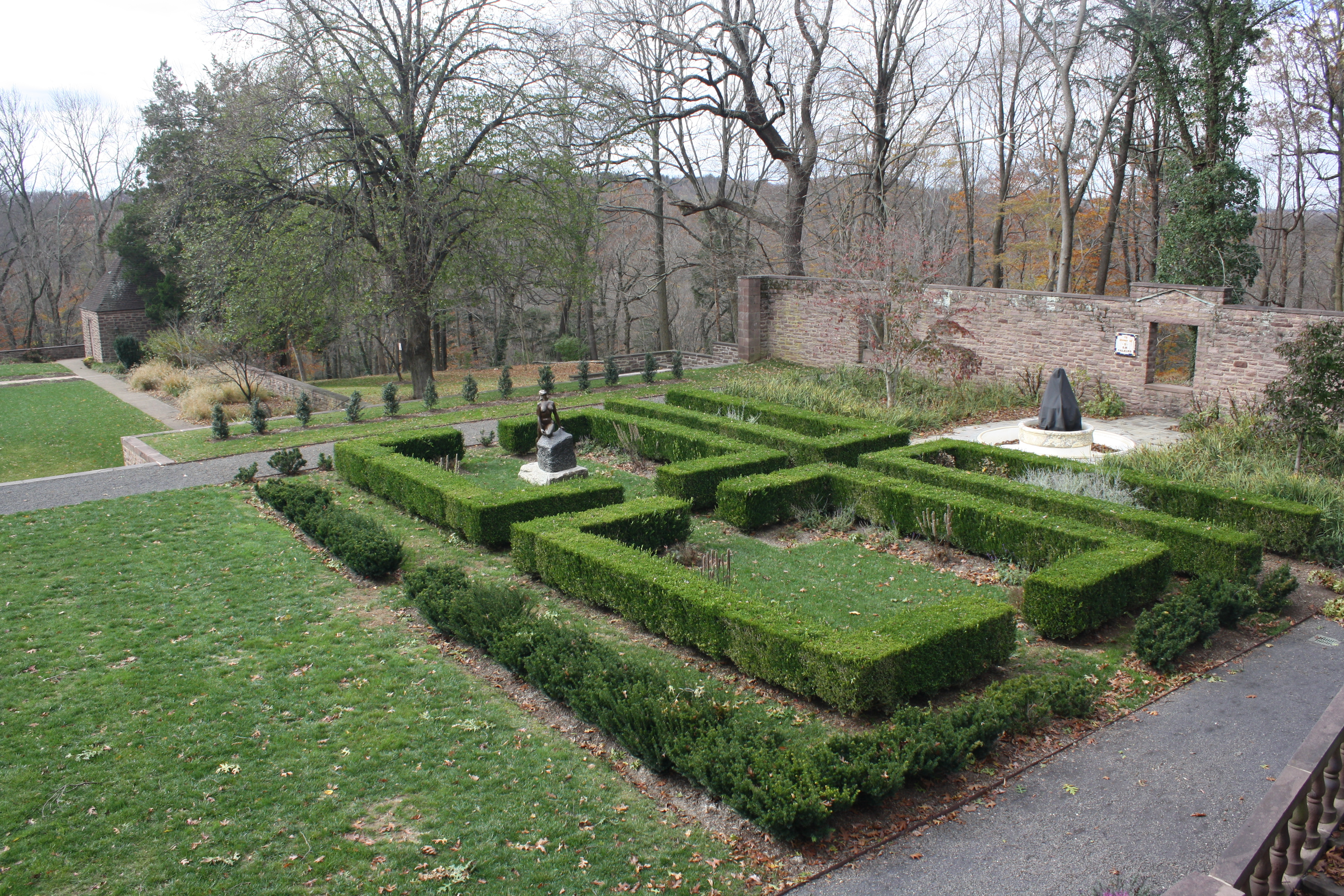
The Formal Gardens.

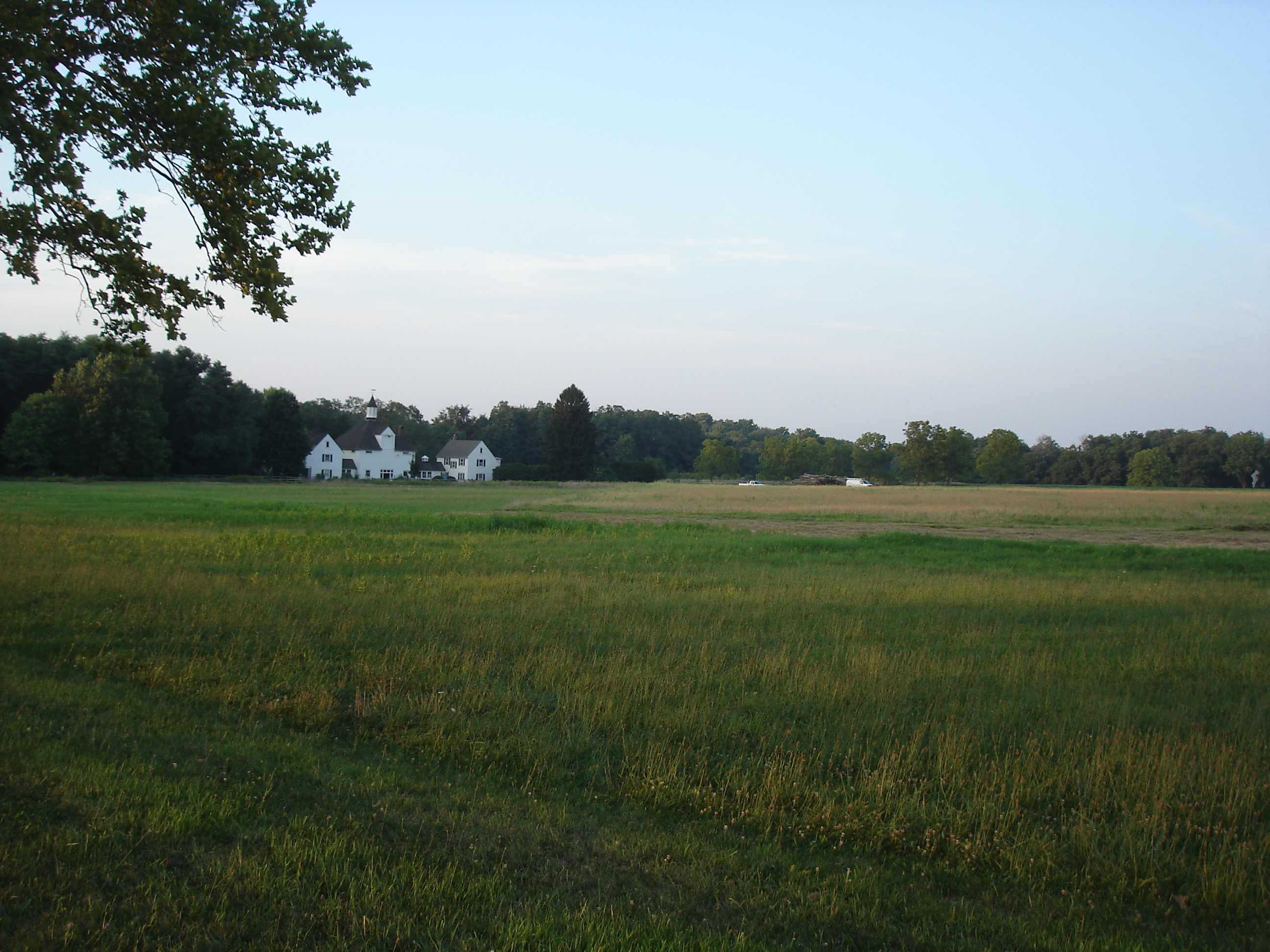
Dairy barn, now the Guild of Craftsmen building.
