= Boris Blai =

American sculptor (1893–1985)

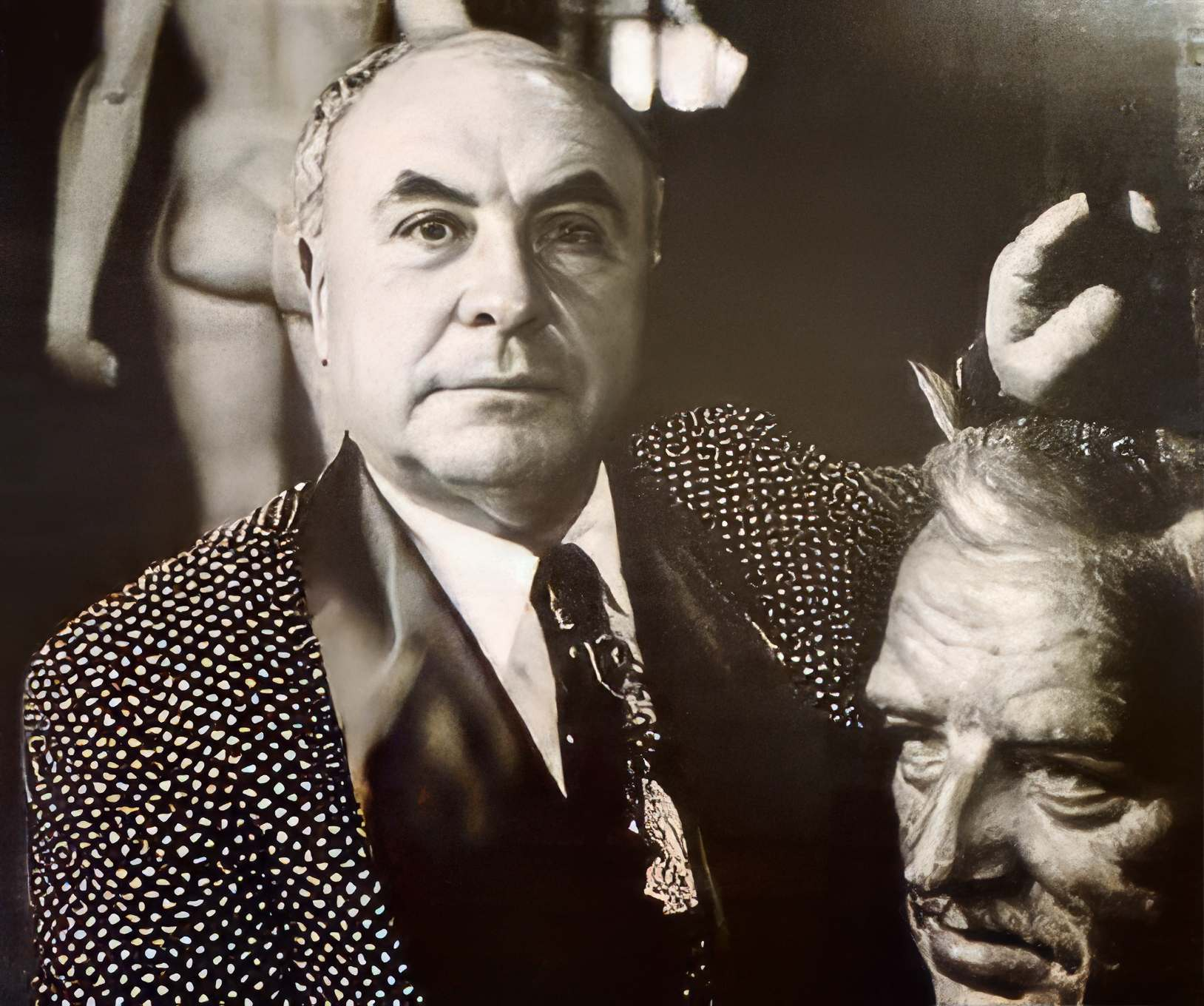
- Boris Blai with bust of Russell Conwell
- Born: July 24, 1893; Rivne, Ukraine
- Died: June 28, 1985 (aged 91); Philadelphia, Pennsylvania, United States
- Occupation: Sculptor

Boris Blai (July 24, 1893 – June 28, 1985) was a Ukrainian-born American sculptor, and academic administrator. His work was part of the sculpture event in the art competition at the 1932 Summer Olympics.

In 1935, Blai founded and became the dean of the Stella Elkins Tyler School of Art at Temple University. The school was named for one of his former students, who, with her husband, had donated the estate where it was established.

Two of Blai's sculptures are publicly accessible on the Temple campus: a large bust of Temple's founder Russell Conwell which decorates Conwell's grave site, and a small statue of Johnnie Ring, Conwell's orderly during the Civil War.
