= Mill Creek (Neshaminy Creek tributary, Doylestown Township) =

- Mill Creek

Location
- Country: United States
- State: Pennsylvania
- County: Bucks
- Township: Doylestown; Warrington

Physical characteristics
- Source
  - coordinates: 40°15′47″N 75°9′43″W
  - elevation: 390 feet (120 m)
- Mouth
  - coordinates: 40°16′30″N 75°9′43″W
  - elevation: 217 feet (66 m)
- Basin size: 4.88 square miles (12.6 km^{2})

Basin features
- Progression: Mill Creek → Neshaminy Creek → Delaware River → Delaware Bay
- River system: Delaware River

Mill Creek is one of the three tributaries of the Neshaminy Creek bearing the name and one of six Mill Creeks in Bucks County, Pennsylvania. Rising in Doylestown Township, Mill Creek runs about 2 miles (3.2 km) to its confluence at Neshaminy Creek's 36.40 river mile.

== Statistics ==
Mill Creek meets the Neshaminy Creek at the Neshaminy's 36.40 river mile. It drains a Watershed of 4.88 square miles (12.6 km^{2}).The Geographic Name Information System I.D. is 1181119, U.S. Department of the Interior Geological Survey I.D. is 02638.

== Course ==
Rising near the intersection of Limekiln Pike (Pennsylvania Route 152) and Stump Road from an unnamed pond, Mill Creek flows southeast for a very short distance whereupon it runs a little less than 2 miles (3.2 km) picking up two unnamed tributaries from the right, then for a very short distance it curls to the north where it meets the Neshaminy Creek.

== Municipalities ==
- Bucks County
  - Doylestown Township
  - Warrington Township

== Crossings and Bridges ==
- Bristol Road - NBI Structure Number 7216, bridge is 10 metres (33 ft) long, box beam or girders - single or spread, prestressed concrete, built in 1987.
- Pickertown Road - NBI Structure Number 7495, bridge is 20 metres (66 ft) long, box beam or girders - multiple, prestressed concrete, built in 2004.

== See also ==
- List of rivers of Pennsylvania
- List of rivers of the United States
- List of Delaware River tributaries
