= Alice of Dunk's Ferry =

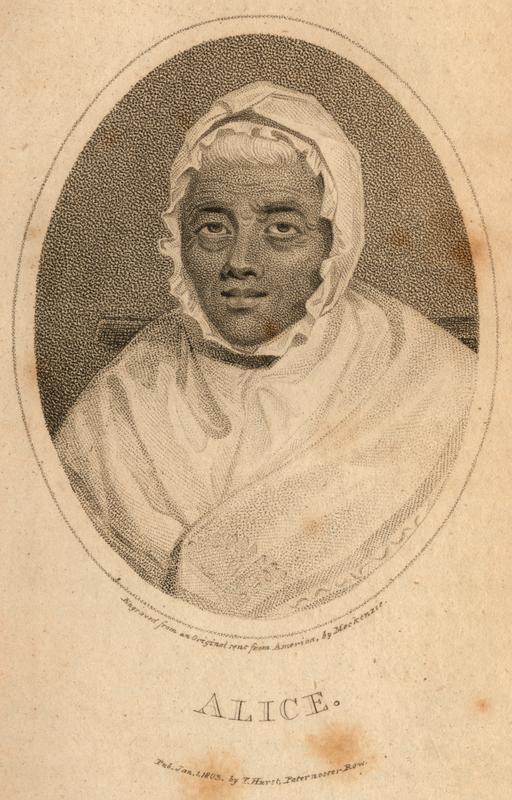
- Born: c. 1686 (claimed); Philadelphia, Pennsylvania
- Died: 1802; Bristol, Pennsylvania
- Other names: Black Alice; Old Alice
- Occupations: Enslaved person, toll collector, oral historian
- Known for: Being one of black America's early oral historians, longevity claim

Alice of Dunk's Ferry (died 1802) was an African-American slave, toll collector, and centenarian who was "one of Black America's early oral historians".

== Early life ==
Alice was born enslaved in Philadelphia to enslaved parents, brought to colonial North America from Barbados. She claimed a birth date of circa 1686, which would have made her 116 at her death. She lived in Philadelphia until the age of ten when she was taken to Dunk's Ferry in Bucks County, Pennsylvania, about 17 miles up the Delaware River, where she remained for the rest of her life. For 40 years, she collected tolls to cross the river, working for a master named as Samuel Carpenter, a friend of William Penn's.

== Oral history ==
Alice became known as "Alice of Dunk's Ferry", gaining a reputation as a lively and engaging figure who enjoyed sharing her recollections of her early years. Having seen Philadelphia develop from "an early river settlement to the capital of a new nation", she became a celebrated local historian. Jessie Carney Smith wrote that:

She was respected by her contemporaries as an oral historian and they liked to hear her graphic recollections of people, places, and events. She remembered the ground on which Philadelphia stands when it was a wilderness, when native Americans hunted wild game in the woods while panthers, wolves, and other beasts of the forest prowled about the wigwams and cabins in which they lived.

Thus, Alice became one of America's earliest oral historians and a vibrant source of information for those who had the chance to speak with her. Although, like most enslaved people, she was unable to read or write, she loved to have the Bible read to her, and was respected for having "a great regard for truth". Alice was said to have lit the pipe of William Penn (1644–1718), founder of Pennsylvania, and to have made the acquaintance of Thomas Story. In his Eccentric biography; or, Memoirs of remarkable female characters, ancient and modern, Isaiah Thomas (founder of the American Antiquarian Society) wrote that:

Being a sensible intelligent woman, and having a good memory, which she retained to the last, she would often make judicious remarks on the population and improvements of the city and country; hence her conversation became peculiarly interesting, especially to the immediate descendants of the first settlers, of whose ancestors she often related acceptable anecdotes.

== Latter years and death ==
At the supposed ages of 96–100, Alice gradually lost her sight but, though blind, remained skilled at catching fish: "she could not be idle". At about the age of 102, her sight returned, improving enough that she could perceive moving objects, though she could not distinguish between people. Thomas reported that "before she died her hair became perfectly white and the last of her teeth dropt sound from her head aged 116 years". She died, in 1802, at Bristol, Pennsylvania.

In recent years, efforts have been made to tell Alice's story and to acknowledge the legacy of slavery, including by Christ Church, Philadelphia, where she was a lifelong worshipper. Alice was said to have galloped on horseback to Christ Church every Sunday aged 95. Today, a granite monument marks the spot of Dunk's Ferry, one of the first such ferry crossings in the United States. Dr Audrey Henry, a local historical society member, said in 2015 that:

Alice's story forces us to acknowledge the presence of slavery, not only in our state, but in our very own city, and in the churches in the North... This has been one of the goals of Christ Church, Alice's church, where many of our Founding Fathers worshipped and which is examining the Episcopal church's role during this period of our nation's history.

She has also been lauded for her largely ignored entrepreneurial activities, such as establishing fisheries, gathering shad to be packed in salt in barrels and sold in Philadelphia, and to ships leaving on voyages.
