= West Branch Neshaminy Creek =

- West Branch Neshaminy Creek

Location
- Country: United States
- State: Pennsylvania
- County: Montgomery; Bucks
- Township: Franconia; Hatfield; New Britain
- Borough: Hatfield

Physical characteristics
- Source
  - coordinates: 40°17′43″N 75°18′12″W
  - elevation: 340 feet (100 m)
- Mouth
  - coordinates: 40°16′56″N 75°12′15″W
  - elevation: 240 feet (73 m)
- Length: 8.01 miles (12.89 km)
- Basin size: 25 square miles (65 km^{2})

Basin features
- Progression: West Branch Neshaminy Creek → Neshaminy Creek → Delaware River → Delaware Bay
- River system: Delaware River
- Landmarks: West Branch Park; Kelly Park
- Tributaries
  - left: Reading Creek
- Bridges: Bergey Road; Penn Avenue; East Broad Street; East Lincoln Avenue; Chestnut Street; East Vine Street; Orvilla Road; Line Lexington Road; Pennsylvania Route 309 (Bethlehem Pike); County Line Road; Schoolhouse Road
- Slope: 12.48 feet per mile (2.364 m/km)

West Branch Neshaminy Creek is one of two branches of the Neshaminy Creek, the other being the North Branch, part of the Delaware River watershed. It is located in Bucks and Montgomery Counties in Pennsylvania.

== Course ==
West Bank Neshaminy Creek rises from an unnamed pond southeast of County Line Road between Church Street and East Township Line Road at an elevation of 340 feet (100 m), flowing south for about 2.70 miles (4.35 km) where it meets an unnamed tributary from the left bank, then turns to the southeast for about 1.3 miles (2.1 km) where it meets a tributary from the right. Then it meanders to the east, then northeast, then southeast, picking up three more tributaries from the right and one from the left (Arrowhead Spring Creek) before meeting up with the North Branch to form the Neshaminy at an elevation of 240 feet (73 m), total length of the branch is 8.01 miles (12.89 km), resulting in an average slope of 12.48 feet per mile (2.364 m/km). The West Branch drains 25 square miles (65 km^{2}).

== Named tributaries ==
- Reading Creek

== Municipalities ==
- Bucks County
  - Chalfont Borough
  - New Britain Township
- Montgomery County
  - Hatfield Township
  - Hatfield Borough
  - Franconia Township

== Bridges ==
Crossing	NBI Number	Length	Lanes	Spans	Material/Design	Built	Reconstructed	Latitude	Longitude
County Line Road	-	-	-	-	-	-	-	-	-
East Township Line Road	-	-	-	-	-	-	-	-	-
Bergey Road	-	-	-	-	-	-	-	-	-
Penn Avenue	-	-	-	-	-	-	-	-	-
East Broad Street	27529	8 metres (26 ft)	2	2	Masonry Arch-deck	-	-	40°16'50.8"N	75°17'53.62"W
East Lincoln Avenue	42587	8.2 metres (27 ft)	2	2	Masonry Arch-deck	-	-	40°16'49"N	75°17'51"W
Chestnut Street	-	-	-	-	-	-	-	-	-
East Vine Street	27896	15 metres (49 ft)	2	1	Prestressed concrete Box Beam or Girders - Multiple	1986	-	40°16'36"N	75°17'33"W
Orvilla Road	27532	25 metres (82 ft)	2	3	Masonry Arch-Deck	-	-	40°17'1.7"N	75°16'22.17"W
Line Lexington Road	28020	12.8 metres (42 ft)	2	-	Prestressed concrete Box Beam or Girders - Multiple	1998	-	40°16'8"N	75°16'19"W
Pennsylvania Route 309 (Bethlehem Pike)	27400	23 metres (75 ft)	4	2	Concrete Tee Beam	1934	1963	40°16'24"N	75°15'30.75"W
County Line Road	-	-	-	-	-	-	-	-	-
Schoolhouse Road	-	-	-	-	-	-	-	-	-

== See also ==
- List of rivers of Pennsylvania
- List of rivers of the United States
- List of Delaware River tributaries
