= Cooks Run (Neshaminy Creek tributary) =

- Cooks Run

Location
- Country: United States
- State: Pennsylvania
- County: Bucks
- Township: Doylestown; New Britain

Physical characteristics
- Source
  - coordinates: 40°19′9″N 75°8′8″W
  - elevation: 340 feet (100 m)
- Mouth
  - coordinates: 40°17′32″N 75°10′52″W
  - elevation: 226 feet (69 m)
- Length: 2.2 miles (3.5 km)
- Basin size: 3.32 square miles (8.6 km^{2})

Basin features
- Progression: Cooks Run → Neshaminy Creek → Delaware River → Delaware Bay
- River system: Delaware River
- Landmarks: Wilma Quinlan Nature Preserve
- Bridges: Burpee Road; North Shady Retreat Road; Ironhill Road; Business U.S. Route 202 (East Butler Avenue); Almshouse Road (South Tamenand Avenue)
- Slope: 51.82 feet per mile (9.814 m/km)

Cooks Run is a tributary of the Neshaminy Creek. Rising in Doylestown Township, Bucks County, Pennsylvania, it runs about 2 miles (3.2 km) to its confluence with the Neshaminy Creek.

== History ==
Cooks Run is named after Arthur Cooke, a large landowner in Bucks County in the late 17th century. The stream supplied power for three mills, Hisand's near Doylestown, Godshalk's in New Britain, and Landis' near its mouth at the Neshaminy once known as Kepharts and Godshalks Dam.

== Statistics ==
Cooks Run meets the Neshaminy Creek at its 38.10 river mile, and drains a watershed of 3.32 square miles (8.6 km^{2}). The Geographic Name Information System I.D. is 1172392, U.S. Department of the Interior Geological Survey I.D. is 02776. The Cooks Run watershed, which is approximately 3.3 square miles in size, is located in central Bucks County. Cooks Run flows in a southwesterly direction and discharges into the Neshaminy Creek, which in turn flows into the Delaware River. Currently, Cooks Run is classified as Warmwater Fishery (WWF), MF (Migratory Fishery) under PA DEP's Chapter 93 Water Quality Standards. Both the Neshaminy Creek and Cooks Run are listed on the State's 303(d) List of Impaired Waters.

== Course ==
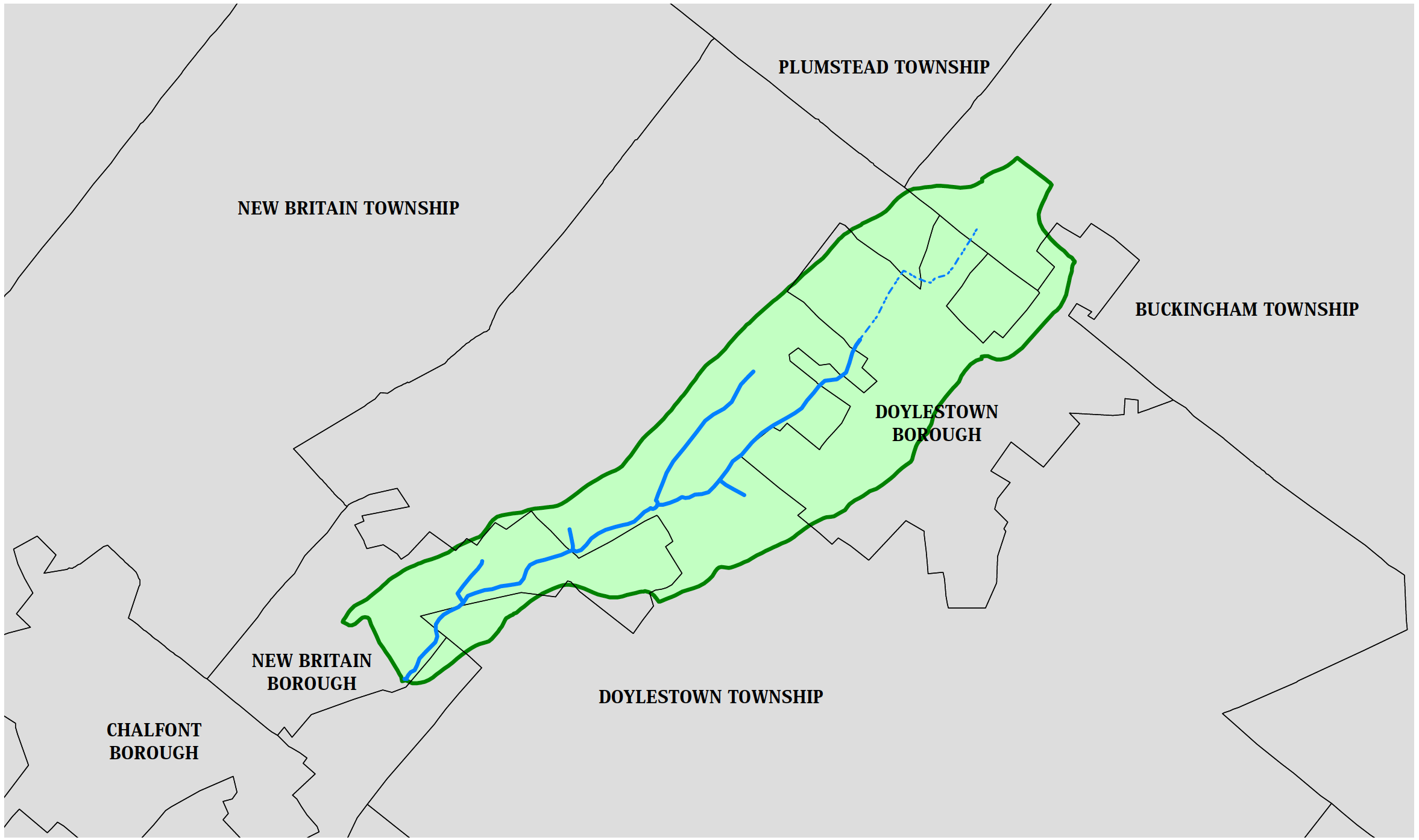
Watershed Map

Cooks Run rises adjacent to the Pennsylvania Route 611 bypass near the current location of Doylestown Hospital and runs generally southwest to its confluence at Neshaminy Creek and Miller Point at the Wilma Quinlan Nature Preserve.

== Municipalities ==
- Bucks County
  - New Britain
  - Doylestown Township

== Crossings and Bridges ==
- Almshouse Road (South Tamenend Avenue) - NBI Structure Number 7339, bridge is 12 metres (39 ft) long, 2 lane, single span, tee beam design, concrete construction, built in 1933.
- Business U.S. Route 202 (East Butler Avenue) - NBI Structure Number 6916, bridge is 10 metres (33 ft) long, tee beam design, concrete construction, built in 1926.
- Iron Hill Road - NBI Structure Number 48010, bridge is 9 metres (30 ft) long, 2 lane, 2 span, culvert design, concrete construction, built in 2005.
- North Shady Retreat Road - NBI Structure Number 47935, bridge is 7 metres (23 ft) long, 2 lane, 2 spans, culvert design, concrete construction, built in 1977.
- Burpee Road - NBI Structure Number 47934, bridge is 7 metres (23 ft) long, 2 lane, single span, culvert design, concrete construction, built in 1977.

== See also ==
- List of rivers of Pennsylvania
- List of rivers of the United States
- List of Delaware River tributaries
