= Newtown Creek (Neshaminy Creek tributary) =

River in Pennsylvania, United States

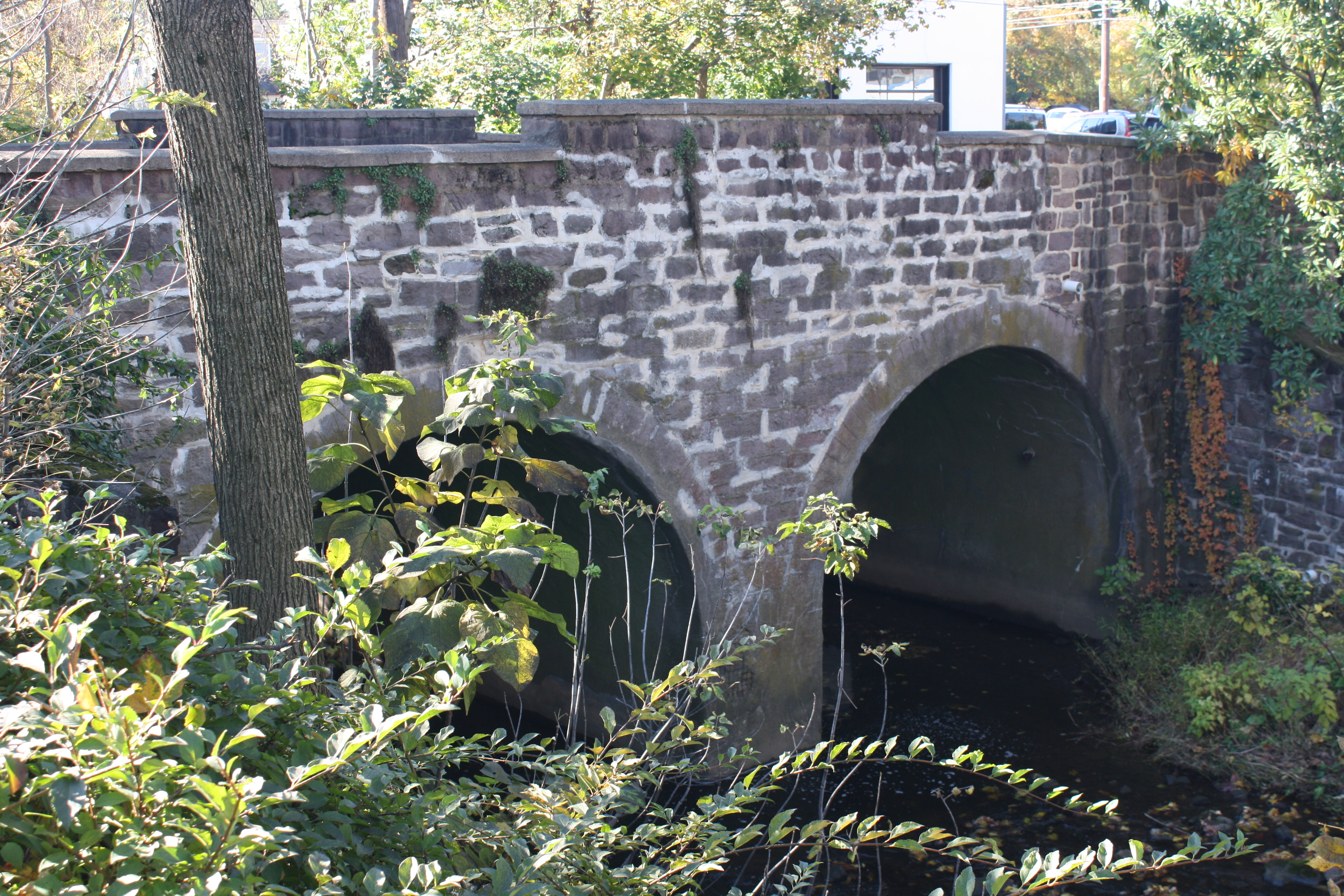
- Newtown Creek Bridge

- Newtown Creek

Location
- Country: United States
- State: Pennsylvania
- County: Bucks
- Township: Newtown, Middletown
- Borough: Newtown

Physical characteristics
- Source
  - coordinates: 40°15′56″N 74°57′51″W
  - elevation: 320 feet (98 m)
- Mouth
  - coordinates: 40°12′39″N 74°56′34″W
  - elevation: 69 feet (21 m)
- Length: 5.66 miles (9.11 km)
- Basin size: 6.29 square miles (16.3 km^{2})

Basin features
- Progression: Newtown Creek → Neshaminy Creek → Delaware River → Delaware Bay
- River system: Delaware River
- Landmarks: All Saints Cemetery, Roberts Ridge Park, Newtown Cemetery, Newtown Creek Bridge, George School
- Slope: 44.35 feet per mile (8.400 m/km)

Newtown Creek is a tributary, rising near Stoop Road in Newtown Township, Bucks County, Pennsylvania, United States. It is part of the Delaware River watershed and is located entirely in Bucks County, Pennsylvania. The Newtown Creek Bridge over Centre Avenue was added to the National Register of Historic Places in 1988.

== Statistics ==
Newtown Creek rises near Stoopville Road east of Pennsylvania Route 413, flows generally in a southerly direction to its confluence at the Neshaminy Creek's 16.1 river mile passing along the western side of Newtown Borough. Its watershed is approximately 6.29 square miles (16.3 km^{2}).

== Tributaries ==
Newtown Creek has one unnamed tributary on the left bank near Wright's Road.

== Geology ==
- Appalachian Highlands Division
  - Piedmont Province
    - Gettysburg-Newark Lowland Section
      - Lockatong Formation

Newtown Creek rises in the Lockatong Formation, sedimentary rock deposited during the Upper Triassic. Mineralogy includes argillite, shale, some limestone and calcareous shale.

== Municipalities ==
- Middletown Township
- Newtown Township
- Newtown Borough

== Crossings and Bridges ==
Crossing	NBI Number	Length	Lanes	Spans	Material/Design	Built	Reconstructed	Latitude	Longitude
Pennsylvania Route 532 (Newtown Bypass)	7003	9 metres (30 ft)	2	1	Steel culvert	1974		40°13'6"N	74°56'24"W
Barclay Street	7510	11 metres (36 ft)	1	1	Steel stringer/multi-beam or girder	1917	2007	40°13'19.2"N	74°56'17.8"W
West Centre Avenue	7289	10 metres (33 ft)	2	2	Masonry arch-deck	1796	1875	40°13'40.4"N	74°56'18"W
West Washington Avenue		17 metres (56 ft)	2	1	Steel girder or floorbeam system	1903	1996	40°13'45.8"W	74°56'16.3"W
Jefferson Street	7282	22 metres (72 ft)	2	1	Steel girder or floorbeam system	1903	1996	40°14'0"N	74°56'12"W
Pennsylvania Route 532 (Washington Crossing Road)	7050	12 metres (39 ft)	2	1	Prestressed concrete box beam or girders	1967		40°14'32.6"N	74°56'2"W
Wrights Road	7517	12 metres (39 ft)	2	1	Prestressed concrete box beam or girders-multiple	1983		40°15'18"N	74°56'18"W
Eagle Road									
South Drive									
North Drive									
Stoopville Road									

== See also ==
- List of rivers of Pennsylvania
- List of rivers of the United States
- List of Delaware River tributaries
