= Reading Creek (West Branch Neshaminy Creek tributary) =

River in Pennsylvania, United States

- Reading Creek

Location
- Country: United States
- State: Pennsylvania
- County: Bucks
- Township: New Britain

Physical characteristics
- Source
  - coordinates: 40°18′37″N 75°14′58″W
  - elevation: 540 feet (160 m)
- Mouth
  - coordinates: 40°17′30″N 75°14′29″W
  - elevation: 279 feet (85 m)
- Length: 1.14 miles (1.83 km)

Basin features
- Progression: Reading Creek → West Branch Neshaminy Creek → Neshaminy Creek → Delaware River → Delaware Bay
- River system: Delaware River
- Bridges: Chalfont Road; Township Line Road; Curley Mill Road; Sellersville Road; Walter Road; Rue St Pierre; Rue St Andre Road
- Slope: 228.95 feet per mile (43.362 m/km)

Reading Creek is a tributary of the West Branch Neshaminy Creek, within New Britain Township, Bucks County, Pennsylvania.

New Britain Township developed Lexington Park, a natural resource park, along the creek for recreation. It is located along the Reading Creek Greenway, which run from the streams confluence with the West Branch Neshaminy Creek north through New Britain.

== Course ==
Reading Creek rises at an elevation of 540 feet (160 m) flowing generally south until it meets its confluence with the West Branch Neshaminy Creek at an elevation of 279 feet (85 m) resulting in an average slope of 228.95 feet per mile (43.362 m/km).

== Crossings and Bridges ==
Crossing	Latitude	Longitude
Township Line Road	40°18'30"N	75°14'31"W
Curley Mill Road	40°18'23"N	75°14'25"W
Sellersville Road	40°18'21"N	75°14'26"W
Walter Road	40°17'57"N	75°14'36"W
Rue St Pierre	40°17'50"N	75°14'36"W
Rue St Andre Road	40°17'49"N	75°14'35"W

== See also ==
- List of rivers of Pennsylvania
- List of rivers of the United States
- List of Delaware River tributaries
