= Core Creek (Newport River tributary) =

- Core Creek (the United States) Core Creek (North Carolina)

Location
- Country: United States
- State: North Carolina
- County: Carteret County

Physical characteristics
- Mouth
  - location: Carteret County, North Carolina, United States
  - coordinates: 34°46′39″N 76°41′9″W
  - elevation: 0 ft (0 m)

Basin features
- Tributaries
  - left: Adams Creek Canal, Eastman Creek

Core Creek is the name of a bay in Carteret County, North Carolina. It is the estuary of the Adams Creek Canal, which leads from the Neuse River estuary to the estuary of the Newport River.
