= Core Creek Park =

County park in Pennsylvania, US

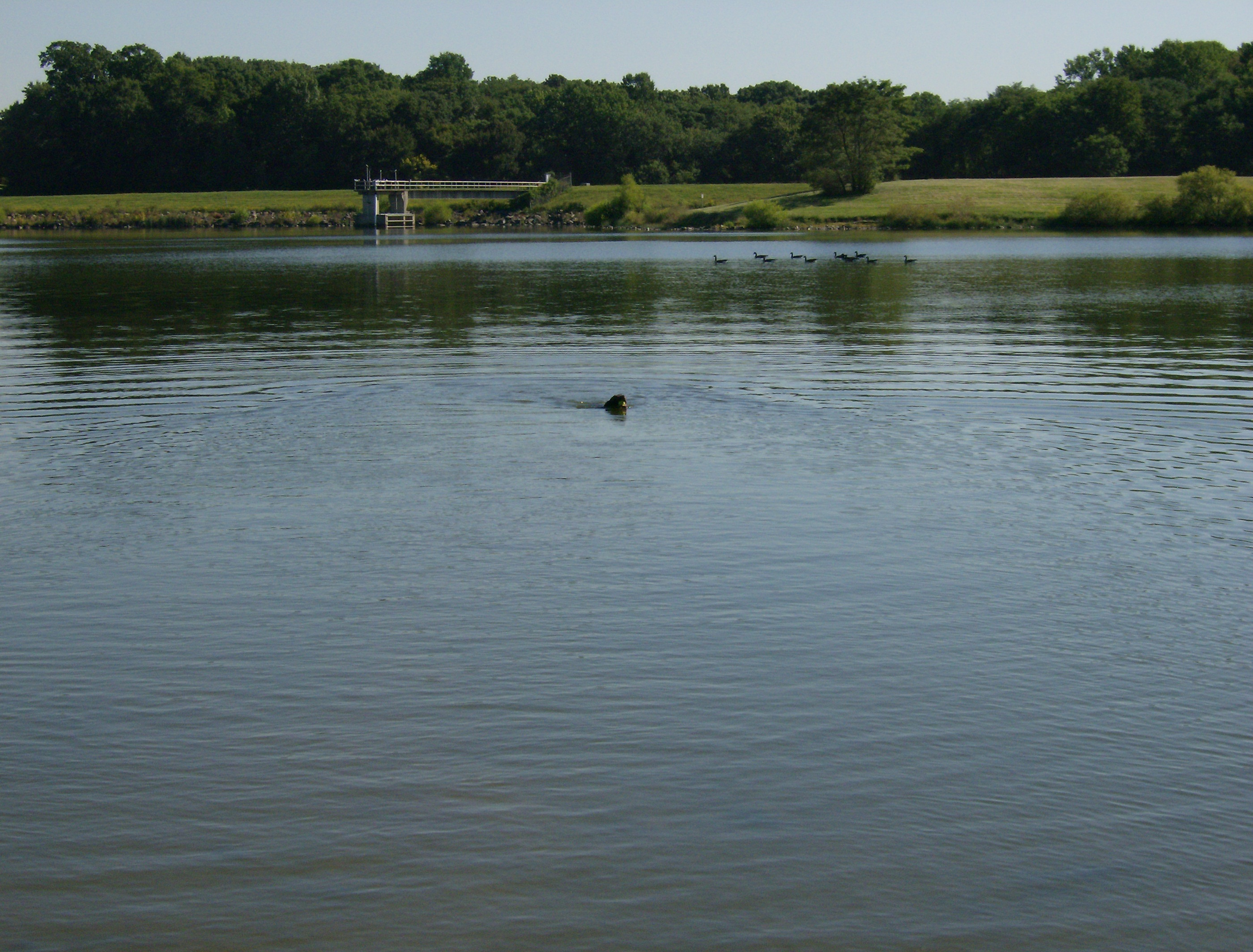
- A dog swims in Lake Luxembourg, at Core Creek Park.

- Location within Pennsylvania
- Interactive map of Core Creek Park
- Type: County park
- Location: Middletown Township, Bucks County, Pennsylvania
- Coordinates: 40.19290°N 74.92330°W
- Area: 1,200 acres (490 hectares)
- Open: Daily, Dawn – Dusk

Core Creek Park, a county park within Bucks County, Pennsylvania. It sits within Middletown Township on 1,200 acres (4.9 km^{2}). The park surrounds Lake Luxembourg, which was formed by a dam on Core Creek. The park opens at dawn and closes at dusk.

== History ==
The first owner of the land around Core Creek was Thomas Croasdale who bought 1000 acres of land from William Penn in 1682. In 1733, Croasdale's grandson was forced to sell the land due to financial problems and John Watson purchased it.

Thomas Jenks purchased a different section of land in 1731. Jenks was a significant man in the Langhorne area in that time period and built many structures in the area including a fulling mill on Core Creek which was a significant place for the people of the time to go and process their sheep's wool. Fulling Mill Road to the north of the park is named after this. During the American Revolutionary War the mill was raided by British soldiers who commandeered the cloth that had been ordered by George Washington's army.

In 1941 when Luxembourg was occupied by Nazi Germany, Charlotte, Grand Duchess of Luxembourg and Prince Felix of Bourbon-Parma, going by the pseudonym Charlotte and Felix de Clervaux, purchased 247 acres of land that had previously been owned by Watson for 22000 dollars after fleeing Luxembourg. They purchased 50 more acres in 1943. The soil around Core Creek was very fertile and was used as a private farm for the royal family.

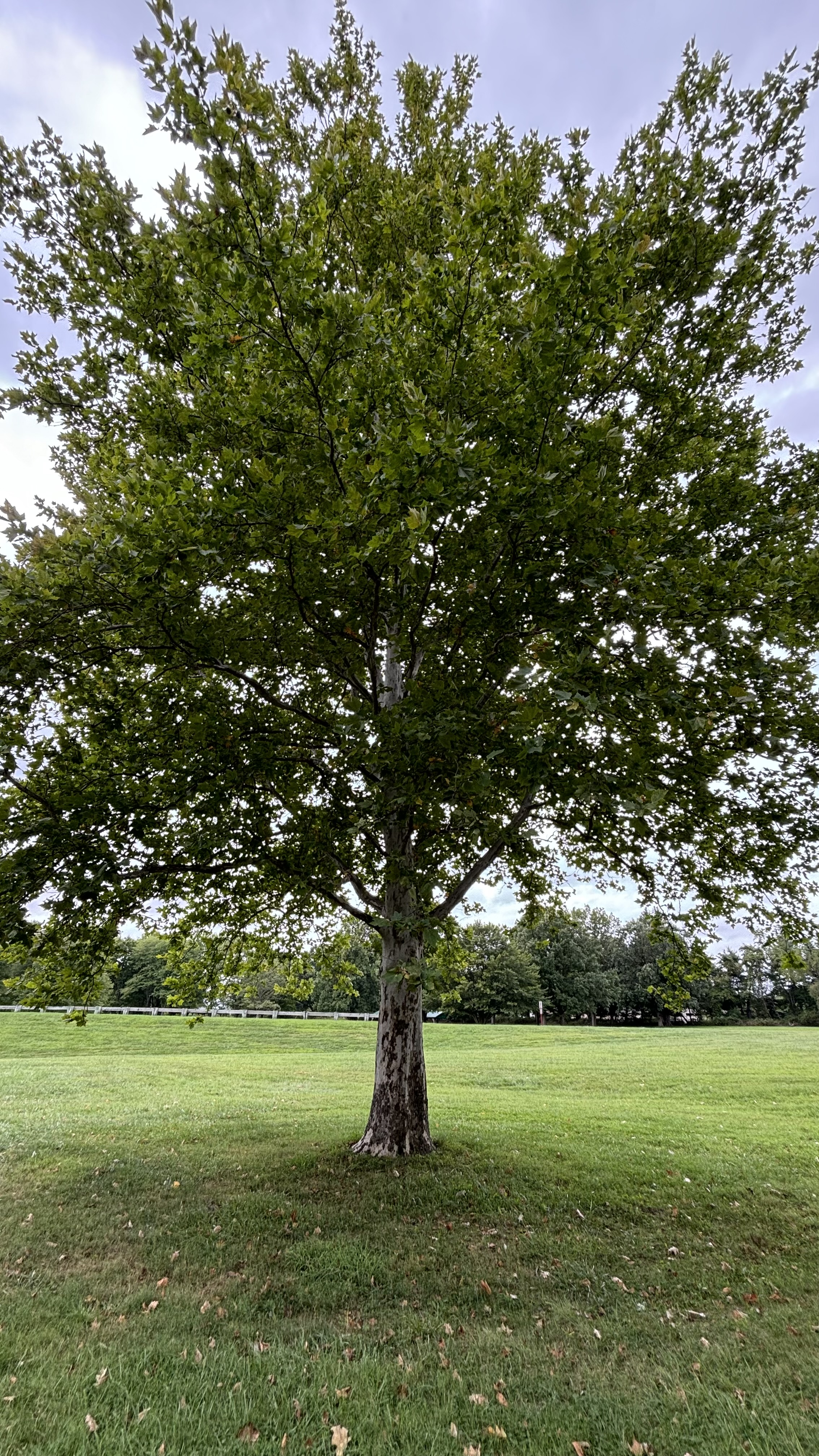
Sycamore Moon Tree grown from a seed flown on Apollo 14, planted in 1976 just north of the boat launch.

In April 1976, a Moon tree, grown from seeds taken into orbit around the Moon aboard NASA's Apollo 14 mission, was planted at Core Creek.

== Recreation ==
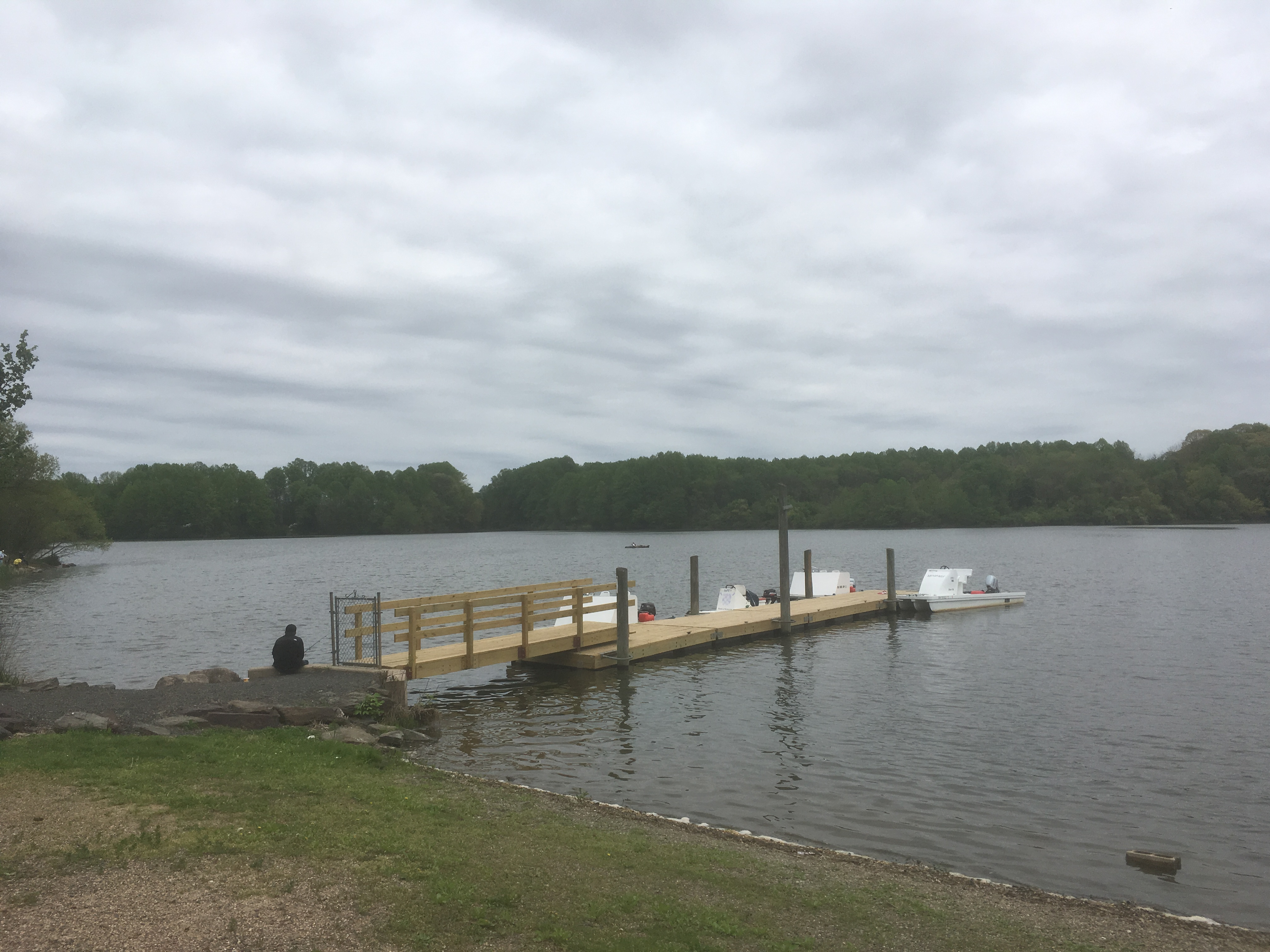
Boat dock on Lake Luxembourg in Core Creek Park

Core Creek Park is open for year-round recreation. The park features numerous grills and tables for picnicking and several miles of trails for hiking, horseback riding, walking and biking. Lake Luxembourg is open for fishing, ice fishing and boating. Part of the lake is open in winter months for ice skating. Core Creek Park also has several playgrounds, ball fields, tennis courts and a nature area.

Core Creek Park is home to Core Creek Off Leash Dog Park, a landscaped membership park with separate facilities for large and small dogs, recognized as one of the top dog parks in the east. Amenities include sally ports for each section with member pass access control, running water with spigots for dogs and their handlers, benches, dog waste stations, and agility devices. Members are responsible for cleaning up after their pets. Smoking, food, and beverages and the use of the facilities for training are prohibited.

== Watershed ==
Core Creek Park surrounds Lake Luxembourg, a lake that was created by impounding in 1975. Lake Luxembourg is about 175 acres (0.71 km^{2}). The lake dams Core Creek, which is a tributary of the Neshaminy Creek, which leads to the Delaware River. Lake Luxembourg drains 15.45 mi^{2} of land consisting primarily of agricultural 54%, forested 22%, and residential 17% land. The lake contains ~2149713m^{3} of water and has a maximum depth of 26 ft. There is one industrial discharge upstream of the lake.

In the summer the lake undergoes thermal stratification and cannot support cold-water fish and thus only supports warm-water fish such as catfish, carp, crappie, sunfish, and largemouth bass among others. As of 1995 17 species of fish are known to live in the lake.

== Climate ==
Climate data for Core Creek Park, Langhorne, Bucks County, Pennsylvania (1981 – 2010 averages).
Month	Jan	Feb	Mar	Apr	May	Jun	Jul	Aug	Sep	Oct	Nov	Dec	Year
Mean daily maximum °F (°C)	40.2 (4.6)	43.3 (6.3)	51.5 (10.8)	63.5 (17.5)	73.1 (22.8)	82.3 (27.9)	86.5 (30.3)	84.8 (29.3)	77.9 (25.5)	66.6 (19.2)	55.7 (13.2)	44.5 (6.9)	64.3 (17.9)
Mean daily minimum °F (°C)	23.5 (−4.7)	25.5 (−3.6)	32.1 (0.1)	41.5 (5.3)	50.8 (10.4)	60.7 (15.9)	65.7 (18.7)	64.3 (17.9)	56.8 (13.8)	44.9 (7.2)	36.6 (2.6)	28.2 (−2.1)	44.3 (6.8)
Average precipitation inches (mm)	3.55 (90)	2.78 (71)	4.18 (106)	3.95 (100)	4.31 (109)	4.33 (110)	5.21 (132)	4.34 (110)	4.39 (112)	3.78 (96)	3.61 (92)	4.07 (103)	48.5 (1,231)
Source: PRISM

The average annual snowfall total at Core Creek Park is between 24-30 inches (61-76 cm).

== Panoramic view ==
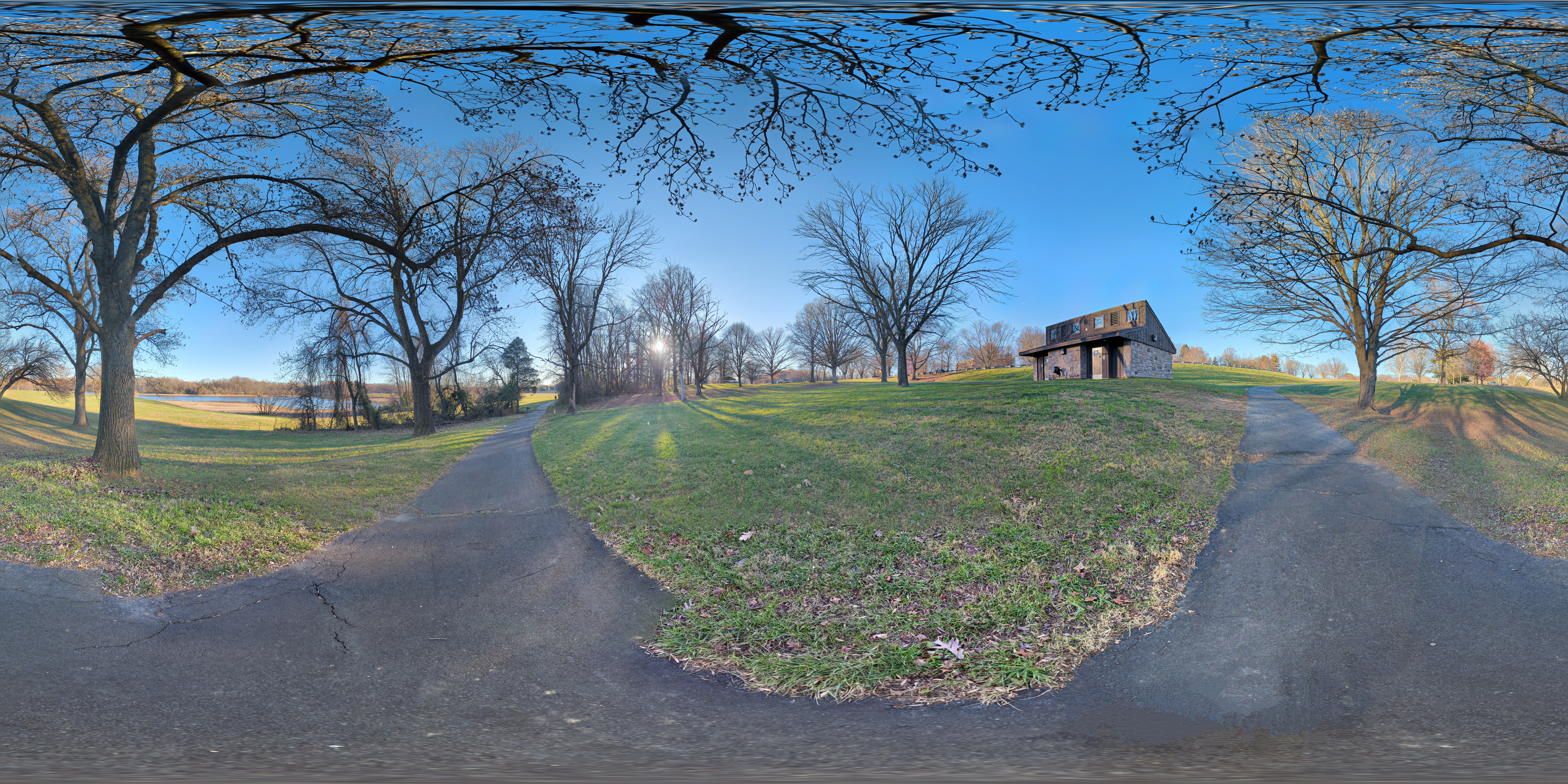
Photosphere view from a paved path in Core Creek Park
