= Core Creek (Neuse River tributary) =

Core Creek Cove creek, Moon Creek

Location
- Country: United States
- State: North Carolina
- County: Craven County, Jones County

Physical characteristics
- Source
  - location: Jones County, North Carolina, United States
  - coordinates: 35°12′0″N 77°17′9″W
- Mouth
  - location: Craven County, North Carolina, United States
  - coordinates: 35°17′26″N 77°24′49″W
  - elevation: 0 ft (0 m)

Core Creek (Earth)
Core Creek (the United States)
Core Creek (North Carolina)

Core Creek is a tributary of the Neuse River in Craven County, North Carolina.
