= Neshaminy State Park =

State park in the U.S. state of Pennsylvania

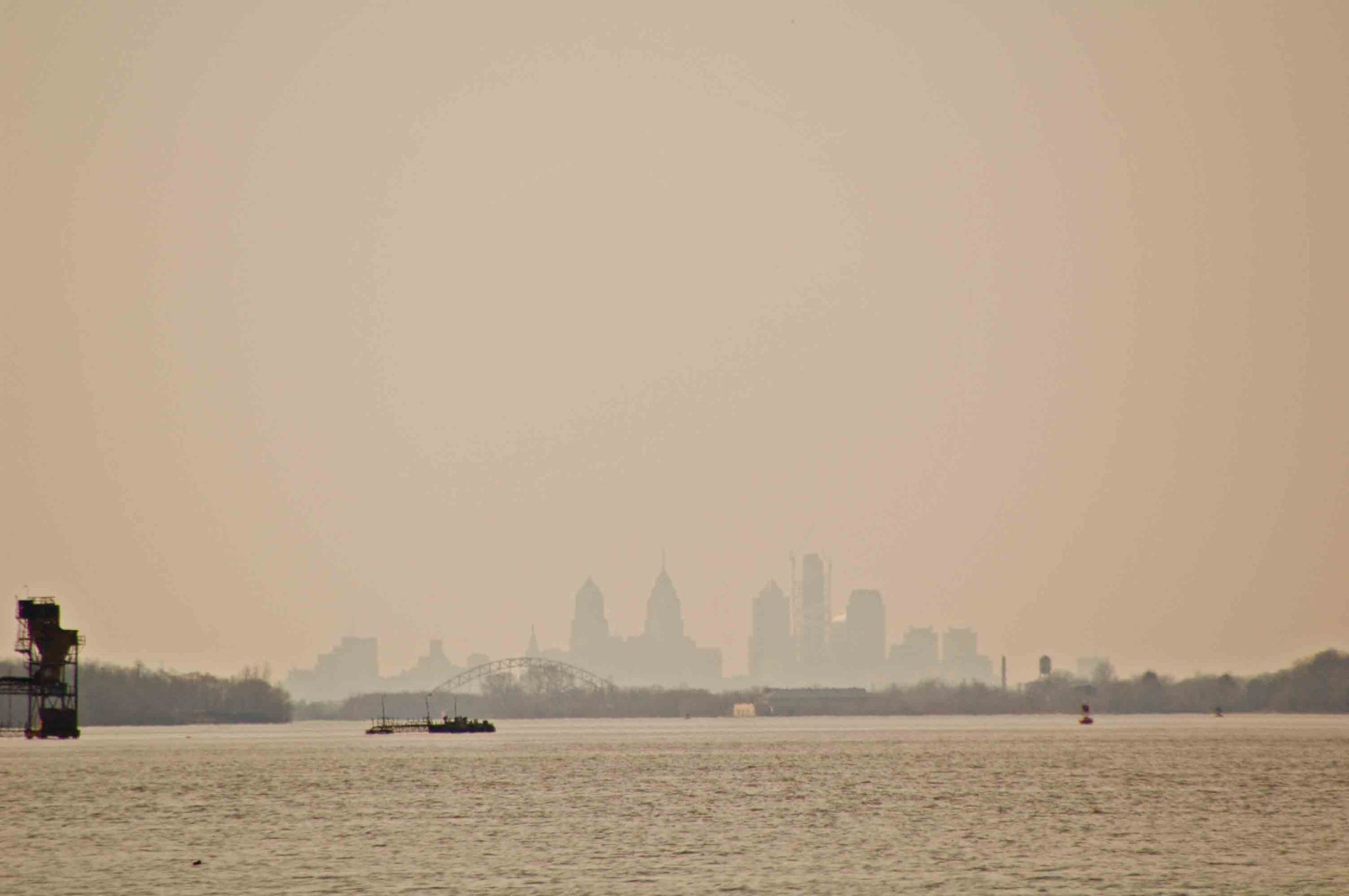
- The Philadelphia skyline as seen from Neshaminy State Park

- Location within Pennsylvania Location within the United States
- Interactive map of Neshaminy State Park
- Location: Bensalem Township, Bucks County, Pennsylvania, United States
- Coordinates: 40°04′38″N 74°55′20″W
- Area: 339 acres (137 ha)
- Elevation: 26 feet (7.9 m)
- Established: 1956
- Administrator: Pennsylvania Department of Conservation and Natural Resources
- Website: Official website
- Pennsylvania State Parks

Neshaminy State Park is a 339-acre (137 ha) Pennsylvania state park in Bensalem Township, Bucks County, Pennsylvania in the United States. Visitors to the park can catch a glimpse of the Philadelphia skyline from a hiking trail on Logan Point. The park is located at the confluence of Neshaminy Creek and the Delaware River. Neshaminy State Park is just off Interstate 95 on Pennsylvania Route 132.

== History ==
Most of the lands of Neshaminy State Park were donated to the Commonwealth of Pennsylvania by the estate of Robert R. Logan in 1956. Logan was a descendant of James Logan who was the colonial secretary to William Penn the founder of Pennsylvania. Dunks Ferry Road, which forms the western boundary of the park, is one of the oldest roads in Pennsylvania. It was built in 1679 by Dunken Williams to provide access to his ferry which crossed the Delaware River. For forty years, the oral historian Alice of Dunk's Ferry collected tolls from those crossing the river. Dunks Ferry Inn was a major rest stop that served travelers from the mid-18th until the late 19th century.

== Ecology ==
Neshaminy State Park is 116 miles (187 km) from the Atlantic Ocean, but it is at sea level. This combination of distance and elevation creates an estuary. The tidal effect causes the river to rise and fall each day. The Lenape who once lived on the banks of the river used tides to help them harvest fish. They built low fences in the tidal zone. At high tide the fish would swim in and be caught by the fences when the waters receded at low tide. According to the A. W. Kuchler U.S. potential natural vegetation types outside of the estuary, Neshaminy State Park would have a dominant vegetation type of Appalachian Oak (104) with a dominant vegetation form of Eastern hardwood forest (25).

== Recreation ==
=== The Delaware River ===
Neshaminy State Park is the home of a 370 slip marina on the Delaware River. Demand for slips in the marina is always very high and the waiting list is long. This is due to the location of the park, it is located squarely within the heart of heavily populated southeastern Pennsylvania. Recreational boating on the Delaware River is especially popular in the summer months. Unlimited horsepower boats are permitted on the river. All boats must display a current registration with any state or have a launch permit from the Pennsylvania Fish and Boat Commission. The Delaware River is a warm water fishery. All fishermen are expected to follow the rules and regulations of the fish commission.

=== Swimming ===
Swimming is not permitted in the river. A swimming pool is open daily from 12:00 pm until 6:00pm weekdays and 12:00 pm until 6:00 pm weekends, Memorial Day weekend through Labor Day weekend. Lifeguards are on duty. Thirteen dollars cash admission is charged to the pool area. For more info, contact http://www.neshaminypool.com.

=== Hiking ===
There are 4 miles (6.4 km) of hiking trails at Neshaminy State Park. Logan Walk is the former driveway to the Logan home. This tree lined trail is paved and serves as a hiking trail and park service road. River Walk Trail is a loop that begins and ends at Logan Walk. It follows the bank of the Delaware River and passes by the estuary and tidal marsh.

== Climate ==
Neshaminy State Park lies in the transition zone between the Temperate Continental climate to the north and the Humid subtropical climate to the south. According to the Trewartha climate classification system, Neshaminy State Park has a Temperate Oceanic climate (Do) with hot summers (a), cool winters (k) and year-around precipitation. Dcak climates are characterized by all months having an average mean temperature > 32.0 °F (0 °C), four to seven months with an average mean temperature ≥ 50.0 °F (10 °C), at least one month with an average mean temperature ≥ 72.0 °F (22 °C) and no significant precipitation difference between seasons. Although most summer days are slightly humid at Neshaminy State Park, episodes of heat and high humidity can occur with heat index values > 109 °F (43 °C). Since 1981, the highest air temperature was 103.1 °F (40 °C) on 07/22/2011, and the highest daily average mean dew point was 76.3 °F (25 °C) on 08/13/1999. The average wettest month is July which corresponds with the annual peak in thunderstorm activity. Since 1981, the wettest calendar day was 6.44 inches (164 mm) on 08/27/2011. During the winter months, the plant hardiness zone is 7a with an average annual extreme minimum air temperature of 2.3 °F (−17 °C). Since 1981, the coldest air temperature was −8.2 °F (−22 °C) on 01/22/1984. Episodes of extreme cold and wind can occur with wind chill values < −8 °F (−22 °C). The average annual snowfall (Nov-Apr) is between 24 and 30 inches (61 and 76 cm). The average snowiest month is February which corresponds with the peak in nor’easter activity.

Climate data for Neshaminy State Park, 1981-2010 normals, extremes 1981-2018
Month	Jan	Feb	Mar	Apr	May	Jun	Jul	Aug	Sep	Oct	Nov	Dec	Year
Record high °F (°C)	72.2 (22.3)	78.3 (25.7)	87.8 (31.0)	94.5 (34.7)	96.1 (35.6)	97.3 (36.3)	103.1 (39.5)	101.1 (38.4)	99.0 (37.2)	89.3 (31.8)	81.9 (27.7)	76.5 (24.7)	103.1 (39.5)
Mean daily maximum °F (°C)	41.1 (5.1)	44.3 (6.8)	52.3 (11.3)	64.0 (17.8)	73.6 (23.1)	82.8 (28.2)	86.9 (30.5)	85.3 (29.6)	78.6 (25.9)	67.3 (19.6)	56.5 (13.6)	45.4 (7.4)	64.9 (18.3)
Daily mean °F (°C)	33.0 (0.6)	35.4 (1.9)	42.7 (5.9)	53.2 (11.8)	62.6 (17.0)	72.1 (22.3)	76.7 (24.8)	75.3 (24.1)	68.2 (20.1)	56.8 (13.8)	47.2 (8.4)	37.4 (3.0)	55.1 (12.8)
Mean daily minimum °F (°C)	24.9 (−3.9)	26.5 (−3.1)	33.0 (0.6)	42.5 (5.8)	51.6 (10.9)	61.5 (16.4)	66.6 (19.2)	65.2 (18.4)	57.9 (14.4)	46.2 (7.9)	37.8 (3.2)	29.4 (−1.4)	45.3 (7.4)
Record low °F (°C)	−8.2 (−22.3)	−1.8 (−18.8)	5.0 (−15.0)	18.4 (−7.6)	33.7 (0.9)	43.1 (6.2)	49.3 (9.6)	44.1 (6.7)	37.6 (3.1)	26.4 (−3.1)	13.8 (−10.1)	0.9 (−17.3)	−8.2 (−22.3)
Average precipitation inches (mm)	3.59 (91)	2.71 (69)	4.27 (108)	3.84 (98)	4.20 (107)	4.17 (106)	4.96 (126)	4.36 (111)	4.02 (102)	3.71 (94)	3.41 (87)	3.91 (99)	47.15 (1,198)
Average relative humidity (%)	64.7	61.6	57.2	57.1	61.5	64.6	65.6	67.7	68.4	67.6	66.2	66.3	64.1
Average dew point °F (°C)	22.4 (−5.3)	23.5 (−4.7)	28.6 (−1.9)	38.4 (3.6)	49.2 (9.6)	59.5 (15.3)	64.3 (17.9)	63.9 (17.7)	57.4 (14.1)	46.2 (7.9)	36.5 (2.5)	27.2 (−2.7)	43.2 (6.2)
Source: PRISM

Climate data for Delaware River Water Temperature 10 Miles Northeast of NSP
Month	Jan	Feb	Mar	Apr	May	Jun	Jul	Aug	Sep	Oct	Nov	Dec	Year
Daily mean °F (°C)	37 (3)	37 (3)	44 (7)	53 (12)	63 (17)	74 (23)	81 (27)	80 (27)	73 (23)	60 (16)	48 (9)	40 (4)	58 (14)
Source: NOAA
