= Core Creek (Neshaminy Creek tributary) =

Core Creek Coar Creek, Koar Creek, Ye Old Mans Creek
- Location within Pennsylvania

Location
- Country: United States
- State: Pennsylvania
- County: Bucks
- Township: Lower Makefield, Middletown

Physical characteristics
- Source
  - coordinates: 40°15′30″N 74°54′51″W
  - elevation: 280 feet (85 m)
- Mouth
  - coordinates: 40°11′22″N 74°55′40″W
  - elevation: 66 feet (20 m)
- Length: 7.24 miles (11.65 km)
- Basin size: 9.77 square miles (25.3 km^{2})

Basin features
- Progression: Core Creek → Neshaminy Creek → Delaware River → Delaware Bay
- River system: Delaware Bay
- Landmarks: Garden of Reflection, Core Creek Park
- Waterbodies: Silver Lake, Lake Luxembourg
- Slope: 29.56 feet per mile (5.598 m/km)

Core Creek is a tributary of the Neshaminy Creek in Bucks County, Pennsylvania. Rising in Lower Makefield Township, it flows in the Stockton Formation until it meets its confluence with the Neshaminy in Middletown Township. At one time it powered seven mills along its length.

== Statistics ==
The watershed of Core Creek is approximately 9.77 square miles (25.3 km^{2}), part of the Delaware River watershed, and meets at the Neshaminy Creek's 14.30 river mile. The Geographic Names Information System I.D. is 1172452. The U.S. Department of the Interior, U.S. Geological Survey I.D. is 02543.

== History ==
An old document in the Library of the Bucks County Historical Society at one time dated "the 3 day of ye 7th month of 1696," the report of a jury appointed by the Court of Bucks County to lay out "a road (viz a cart road) from new towne [Newtown] to ye ferry at Gilbert Wheeler's." At one time there were seven mills along the creek.

== Course ==
Core Creek rises in the northwestern portion of Lower Makefield Township, oriented east, then southeast, then is oriented southwest for some distance, passing into Middletown Township until it passes through Core Creek Park as it passes through Lake Luxembourg, created in 1975. After the lake, it continues southwest until it meets with the Neshaminy Creek.

== Geology ==
- Atlantic Plain
  - Piedmont Province
    - Gettysburg-Newark Lowland Section
      - Stockton Formation

Core creek lies within the Stockton Formation, a bedrock of sandstone, arkosic sandstone, shale, siltstone, and mudstone deposited during the Triassic.

== Municipalities ==
- Bucks County, Pennsylvania
  - Middletown Township
  - Lower Makefield Township

== Crossings and Bridges ==
Crossing	NBI Number	Length	Lanes	Spans	Material/Design	Built	Reconstructed	Latitude	Longitude
Pennsylvania Route 413 (Langhorne Newtown Road)	40951	20 metres (66 ft)	3	1	Prestressed box beam or girders-multiple	2000	-	40°11'26.6"N	74°55'36"W
Park Road									
Woodbourne Road	7245	13 metres (43 ft)	2	1	Prestressed concrete box beam or girder-single or spread	1976	-	40°12'42.2"N	74°54'26.89"W
Pennsylvania Route 332 (Newtown Yardley Road, Newtown Bypass)	7007	43 metres (141 ft)	4	1	Prestressed concrete stringer/multi-beam or girder	1990	-	40°13'54"N	74°54'6"W
Lindenhurst Road	7307	13 metres (43 ft)	2	1	Prestressed concrete box beam or girders-single or spread	1966	-	40°14'7.8"N	74°53'46.5"W
Quarry Road									
Woodside Road									
Lindenhurst Road	41240	6 metres (20 ft)	2	2	Culvert	2001	-	40°15'24.5"N	74°53'50.48"W
Pennsylvania Route 532 (Washington Crossing Road)									

== See also ==
- List of rivers of the United States
- List of rivers of Pennsylvania
- List of Delaware River tributaries
