= Newtown Creek (Churn Creek tributary) =

Location
- Country: United States
- State: California
- County: Shasta County

Physical characteristics
- Source
  - location: Shasta County, California, United States
  - coordinates: 40°40′12″N 122°25′11″W
- Mouth
  - location: Shasta County, California, United States
  - coordinates: 40°38′18″N 122°22′5″W
  - elevation: 630 ft (190 m)
- Length: 4 mi (6.4 km)

Newtown Creek is a tributary of Churn Creek in Shasta County, California, in the United States.
