= Neshaminy Creek =

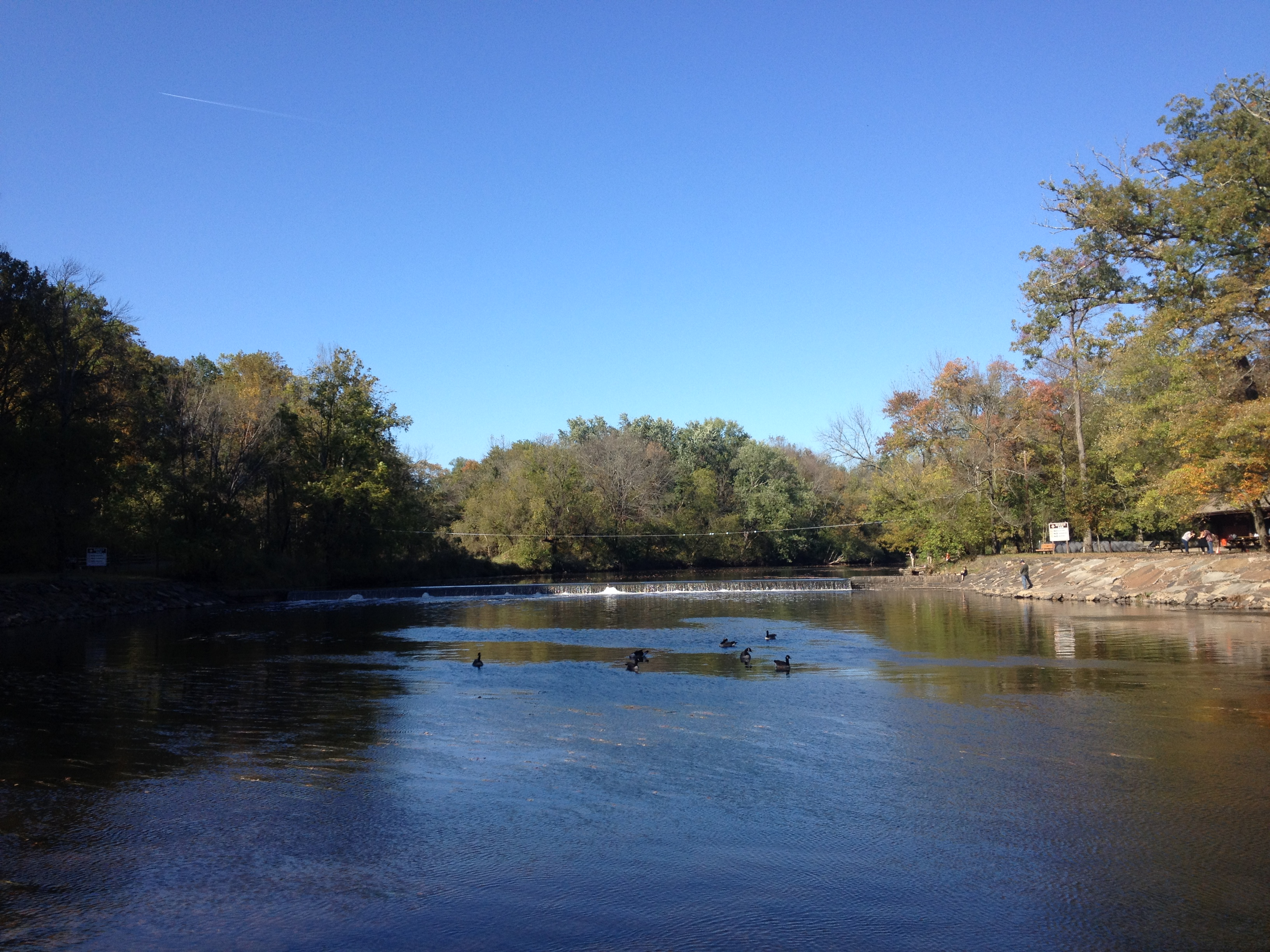
- Neshaminy Creek in Tyler State Park
- Etymology: The place where we drink twice
- Native name: Nishamening (Unami)

Location
- Country: United States
- State: Pennsylvania
- County: Bucks
- Township: New Britain; Doylestown; Warwick; Buckingham; Wrightstown; Northampton; Newtown; Middletown; Lower Southampton; Bensalem; Bristol
- Borough: Chalfont; New Britain; Langhorne; Hulmeville

Physical characteristics
- Source
  - coordinates: 40°16′59″N 75°12′19″W
  - elevation: 220 feet (67 m)
- Mouth
  - coordinates: 40°4′26″N 74°54′32″W
  - elevation: 0 feet (0 m)
- Length: 40.7 mi (65.5 km)
- Basin size: 232 mi^{2} (600 km^{2})

Basin features
- Progression: Neshaminy Creek → Delaware River → Delaware Bay
- River system: Delaware River
- Landmarks: Wilma Quinlin Nature Preserve; Twin Streams Park; Lenape Bike and Hiking Path; Castle Valley Park; Central Park-Kids Castle; Bridge Point Park; Dark Hollow; Diamond Ridge Day Camp; Middle Bucks Institute of Technology; Tyler State Park; Bucks County Community College; George School; Core Creek Park; Playwicki Park; Playwicki Farm Park; Idlewood; Neshaminy State Park
- Tributaries
  - left: North Branch Neshaminy Creek; Cooks Run; Mill Creek; Newtown Creek; Core Creek
  - right: West Branch Neshaminy Creek; Mill Creek; Little Neshaminy Creek; Mill Creek
- Slope: 5.7 feet per mile (1.08 m/km)

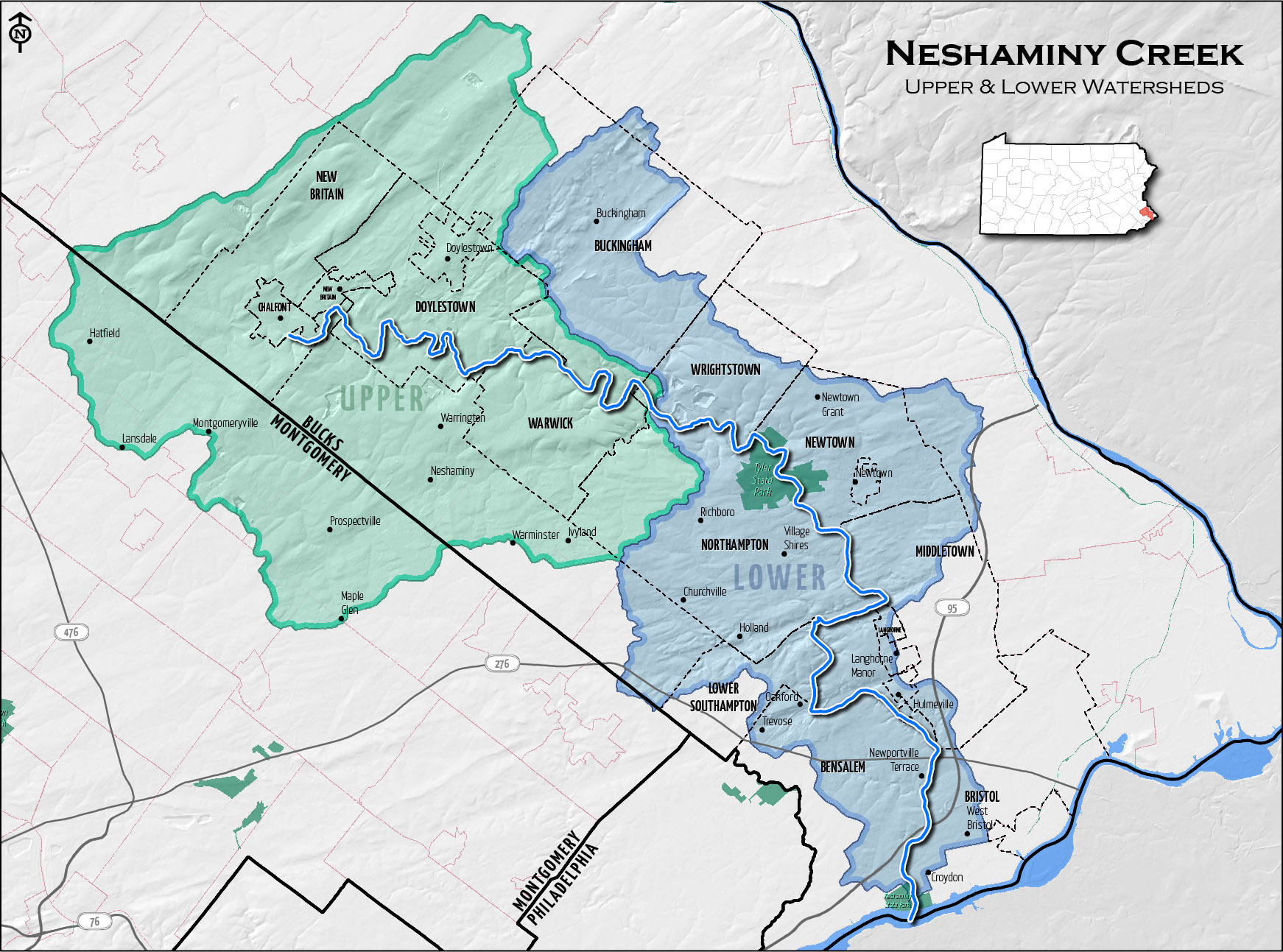
Map of the Neshaminy Creek

Throughout Bucks County, the Neshaminy Creek runs mainly through wooded areas.

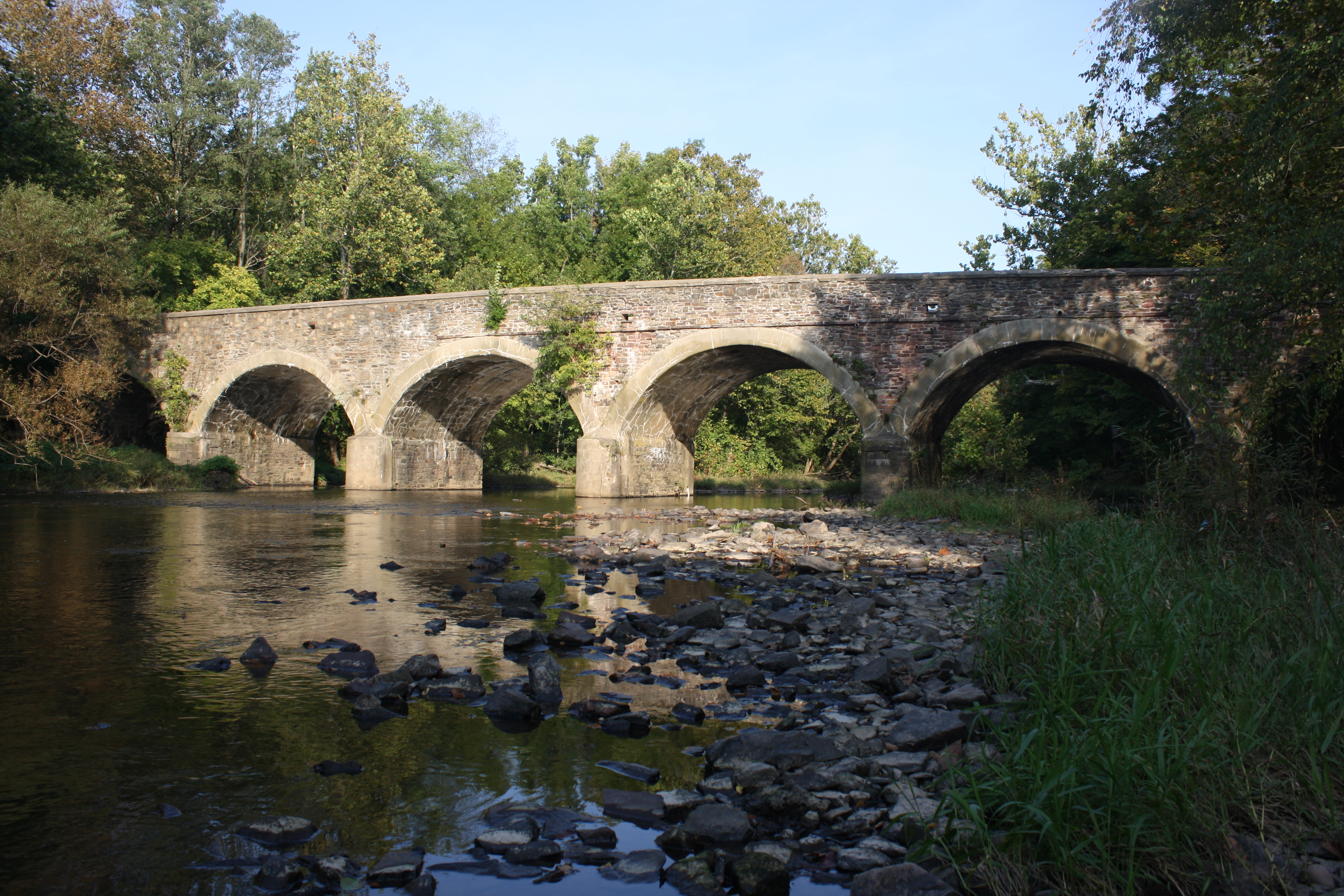
Historic Bridge Valley Bridge (1804) on Neshaminy Creek, north of Hartsville.

Neshaminy Creek is a 40.7-mile-long (65.5 km) stream that runs entirely through Bucks County, Pennsylvania, rising south of the borough of Chalfont, where its north and west branches join. Neshaminy Creek flows southeast toward Bristol Township and Bensalem Township to its confluence with the Delaware River.

The name "Neshaminy" originates with the Lenni Lenape and is thought to mean "place where we drink twice". This phenomenon refers to a section of the creek known as the Neshaminy Palisades, where the course of the water slows and changes direction at almost a right angle, nearly forcing the water back upon itself. These palisades are located in Dark Hollow Park, operated by the county, and are flanked by Warwick Township to the south and Buckingham Township to the north.

== Statistics ==
The watershed of the Neshaminy Creek covers an area of approximately 236 square miles (610 km^{2}), 86 percent of which is located in Bucks County and 14 percent in Montgomery County. It is part of the greater Delaware River watershed. The creek's course runs mostly through suburban areas to the north of Philadelphia. However, the course of the creek does run through a few sections of rural and semi-rural terrain, and some forested areas remain. Neshaminy Creek passes through two state parks, Tyler State Park and Neshaminy State Park. Neshaminy Creek has the distinction of having three tributaries named Mill Creek.

== History ==
The name seems to derive from the Lenape 'Nesha-men-ning', loosely meaning 'the place where we drink twice' or 'two drinking places'. Older names were written as Nishambanach (1671), Nichmink, Nishammis (1679), Nishmines (1680), Neshimineh (1682), Neshamineh (1686), Neshaminia (1688), Neshamenah (1702), and others. This may refer to two springs near a village of the Lenape, since native people drink from a spring whenever available rather than from a stream. The location of the springs is unknown, but may have been two springs extant many years ago, not far from the confluence of the north and west branches. One was known at the time as the 'Great Spring' and the other much smaller about 300 feet (91 m) away and was said to have been near an old Indian trail. The Neshaminy was the first stream in Bucks County to have been crossed by ferries and bridges.

The Gordon Gazetteer of 1832 called it the Neshaminy River and stated that "over it, there are many fine wooden and stone bridges. The bridge nearest its mouth on the road to New York is a draw bridge-in private property, erected by the Messrs. Bassonet and Johnson, whose heirs and assigns levy tolls by virtue of the Act of Assembly 6th Sept. 1785. The Neshaminy as far as Barnsleys Ford was declared a public highway by Act of 9th March, 1771."

The stream has seen a number of major floods, including after seasonal ice. In the Mina flood of 1833, most of the bridges were washed away and was the highest flood known at that time. Compared to the flood of 16–17 July 1865, the 1833 flood was exceeded by 6 feet (1.8 m), rupturing the Turk Dam and destroying almost all of the bridges downstream. As the waters reached the Delaware River, the flow was so great as to reach the New Jersey shoreline leaving a large pile of debris and preventing shipping from traversing the river. The Neshaminy has been the subject of many artists over the years.

== Geology ==
- Appalachian Division, Piedmont Province, Gettysburg-Newark Section

Beginning at the junction of the West Branch and North Branch Neshaminy Creeks, Neshaminy Creek begins in the Brunswick Formation, formed during the Jurassic and Triassic, which consists of mainly mudstone, shale, and siltstone. Mineralogy includes argillite and hornfels. West of Chalfont it passes into an extension of the Lockatong Formation for a short distance, back into the Brunswick, then again to the Lockatong. The Lockatong Formation was deposited during the Triassic and consists of argillite, shale, and occasionally, a layer of limestone.

East of Chalfont, the Neshaminy flows into the Stockton Formation, laid during the Triassic, consisting of arkosic sandstone, sandstone, shale, siltstone, and mudstone. It flows generally along the Stockton and Lockatong transition until the Neshaminy palisades, where it turns west, then in a few miles turns south into a region of felsic gneiss, which contains quartz, microcline, pyroxene, and biotite.

- Appalachian Division, Piedmont Province, Upland Section

After passing Oakford, it passes through a small deposit of mafic gneiss, from the Precambrian, which contains calcic plagioclase, hypersthene or augite, quartz, and hornblende.

- Appalachian Division, Piedmont Province, Lowland and Intermediate Upland Section

Next, the stream passes into the Wissahickon Formation (lower Paleozoic), a schist which has metamorphosed into a facies, containing garnet, staurolite, kyanite, and sillimanite. The Wissahickon also contains oligoclase-mica schist, hornblende and augen gneiss', and some feldspar.

It then passes through a region of Pensauken and Bridgeton Formations, from the Tertiary, but it has eroded through it to the underlying Wissahickon Formation. Both formations consist of quartz sand.

Finally, the Neshaminy passes through the Trenton gravel formation, from the Quaternary, which is sand and clay-silt where it meets the Delaware River.

== Named tributaries ==
  - Mill Creek
    - Pine Run
    - Ironworks Creek
  - Newtown Creek
  - Mill Creek
    - Robin Run
    - Watson Creek
    - Lahaska Creek
  - Little Neshaminy Creek
    - Park Creek
  - Cooks Run
  - Mill Creek
  - North Branch Neshaminy Creek
    - Pine Run
  - West Branch Neshaminy Creek
    - Reading Creek

== Adjacent municipalities ==
- Bensalem Township
- Bristol Township
- Buckingham Township
- Chalfont
- Doylestown
- Doylestown Township
- Hatfield
- Hulmeville
- Ivyland
- Langhorne
- Langhorne Manor
- Lansdale
- Lower Southampton Township
- Middletown Township
- New Britain
- New Britain Township
- Newtown
- Newtown Township
- Northampton Township
- Penndel
- Plumstead Township
- Upper Southampton Township
- Warminster Township
- Warwick Township
- Wrightstown Township

== Flooding ==
Like other rivers and streams, the Neshaminy Creek poses a flooding threat to neighboring areas in times of rapid downpours. The waters of the creek have been known to rise more than 10 feet (3 m) above their normal level during severe storms, such as Hurricane Floyd, which hit the area on September 16, 1999. In 2005, the Natural Resources Conservation Service earmarked $3 million for flood mitigation programs along the Neshaminy Creek. The creek was the site of significant flooding again from June 25 through July 5, 2006, during the Mid-Atlantic United States flood of 2006. In late August through early September 2011, Hurricane Irene, and Tropical Storm Lee (2011) rose the Neshaminy Creek to levels which had not seen before in 100 years. Repairs cost around $1 million total.

== Crossings and bridges ==
Crossing	NBI Number	Length	Lanes	Spans	Material/Design	Built	Reconstructed	Coordinates
Bristol Road	7218	47 metres (154 ft)	2	3	Prestressed Concrete Box Beam or Girders-single or spread	1967		40°17′5″N 75°11′17.5″W
Upper State Road	7537	71 metres (233 ft)	2	3	Prestressed concrete Stringer/Multi-beam or Girder	1973		40°17′21″N 75°10′43.3″W
U.S. Route 202	47700	160 metres (520 ft)	2	4	continuous Prestressed concrete Stringer/Multi-beam or Girder	2012		40°16′54″N 75°10′30″W
Lower State Road	46491	65 metres (213 ft)	2	3	continuous Prestressed concrete Box Beam or Girders - single or spread	2012		40°17′10.3″N 75°9′38.55″W
Pennsylvania Route 611 (South Easton Road)	7062	82 metres (269 ft)	2	2	Steel continuous Stringer/Multi-beam or Girder	1963	1999	40°16′36.7″N 75°7′39.22″W
Pennsylvania Route 263 (York Road)	6961	77 metres (253 ft)	2	3	continuous steel Stringer/Multi-beam or Girder	1969	2017	40°16′32.5″N 75°5′1.9″W
Old York Road	-	-	-	-	-	-	-	40°16′34″N 75°4′59″W
Mill Road	7529	88 metres (289 ft)	1	2	Steel Thru Truss			40°16′9.8″N 75°4′26.8″W
Dark Hollow Road	-	-	-	-	-	-	-	40°15′26″N 75°3′26″W
Rushland-Jamison Road	7328	69 metres (226 ft)	2	5	Concrete Tee Beam	1947	2013	40°15′37.8″N 75°2′7″W
New Hope Railroad	-	-	-	-	Steel girder	1891	-	40°15′18″N 75°1′56″W
Pennsylvania Route 232 (Second Street Pike)	6956	79 metres (259 ft)	2	3	Prestressed concrete Stringer/Multi-beam or girder	1982		40°15′3.7″N 75°0′31.7″W
Worthington Mill Road	7330	75 metres (246 ft)	2	2	continuous Steel Stringer/Multi-beam or Girder	1954		40°14′52″N 74°59′43.3″W
Schofield Ford Covered Bridge	-	-	-	-	-	-	-	40°14′39″N 74°58′50″W
Tyler State Park Main Park Road	-	-	-	-	-	-	-	40°13′54″N 74°58′26″W
Pennsylvania Route 332 (Newtown Richboro Road)	44293	88 metres (289 ft)	2	3	continuous Prestressed concrete Stringer/Multi-beam or Girder	2007		40°13′26.1″N 74°57′55.2″W
Pennsylvania Route 532 (Buck Road)	7049	63 metres (207 ft)	2	3	Concrete Arch-deck	1932		40°12′41.1″N 74°56′52.59″W
Bridgetown Pike	41028	90 metres (300 ft)	2	2	continuous Steel Stringer or Multi-beam or Girder	2001		40°11′21.47″N 74°55′40.6″W
Abandoned railroad	-	-	-	-	-	-	-	40°10′34″N 74°57′23″W
Norfolk Southern Railway's Morrisville Line	-	-	-	-	-	-	-	40°10′29″N 74°57′25″W
Pennsylvania Route 213 (West Maple Avenue)	-	-	-	-	-	-	-	40°10′27″N 74°57′26″W
Brownsville Road	7278	77 metres (253 ft)	2	4	Prestressed Concrete Box Beam or Girders-Multiple	1956	1990	40°10′4.1″N 74°57′5.33″W
SEPTA's West Trenton Line/CSX Transportation's Trenton Subdivision	-	-	-	-	-	-	-	40°8′53″N 74°57′26″W
Old Lincoln Highway	7257	98.8 metres (324 ft)	2	5	Concrete Arch-Deck	1921		40°8′44″N 74°57′25″W
U.S. Route 1 (Lincoln Highway)	6719	97 metres (318 ft)	2	3	Concrete Arch-Deck	1933	1965	40°8′42.6″N 74°57′15.52″W
Pennsylvania Route 513 (Hulmeville Road)	7041	89 metres (292 ft)	3	3	Prestressed concrete continuous Box Beam or Girders-single or spread	1989		40°8′28″N 74°54′45.84″W
Interstate 276 (Pennsylvania Turnpike)	-	-	-	-	-	-	-	40°7′44″N 74°54′0″W
New Falls Road	-	-	-	-	-	-	-	40°7′25″N 74°54′5″W
Interstate 95 (Delaware Expressway) southbound	6854	181.4 metres (595 ft)	2	7	Prestressed concrete multi-beam or Girder	1964	2010	40°6′15″N 74°54′9″W
Interstate 95 (Delaware Expressway) northbound	6851	181.4 metres (595 ft)	2	7	Prestressed concrete multi-beam or Girder	1964	2010	40°6′16″N 74°54′9″W
U.S. Route 13 (Bristol Pike)	-	-	-	-	-	-	-	40°5′36″N 74°54′48″W
Amtrak's Northeast Corridor/SEPTA's Trenton Line	-	-	-	-	-	-	-	40°5′33″N 74°54′49″W
State Road	-	-	-	-	-	-	-	40°5′5″N 74°54′39″W

== See also ==
- List of rivers of Pennsylvania
- List of rivers of the United States
- List of Delaware River tributaries
- Neshaminy Creek Brewing Company

== Sources and external links ==
- U.S. Geological Survey: PA stream gaging stations
- http://www.delawareriverkeeper.org/factsheets/neshaminy.html
- http://fitzpatrick.house.gov/News/DocumentPrint.aspx?DocumentID=36389
- Map of the Forks of the Neshaminy (showing the nearly right angle in the creek within Dark Hollow Park)
- Dark Hollow Park Fact Sheet
