= Newtown Creek Bridge =

- U.S. National Register of Historic Places
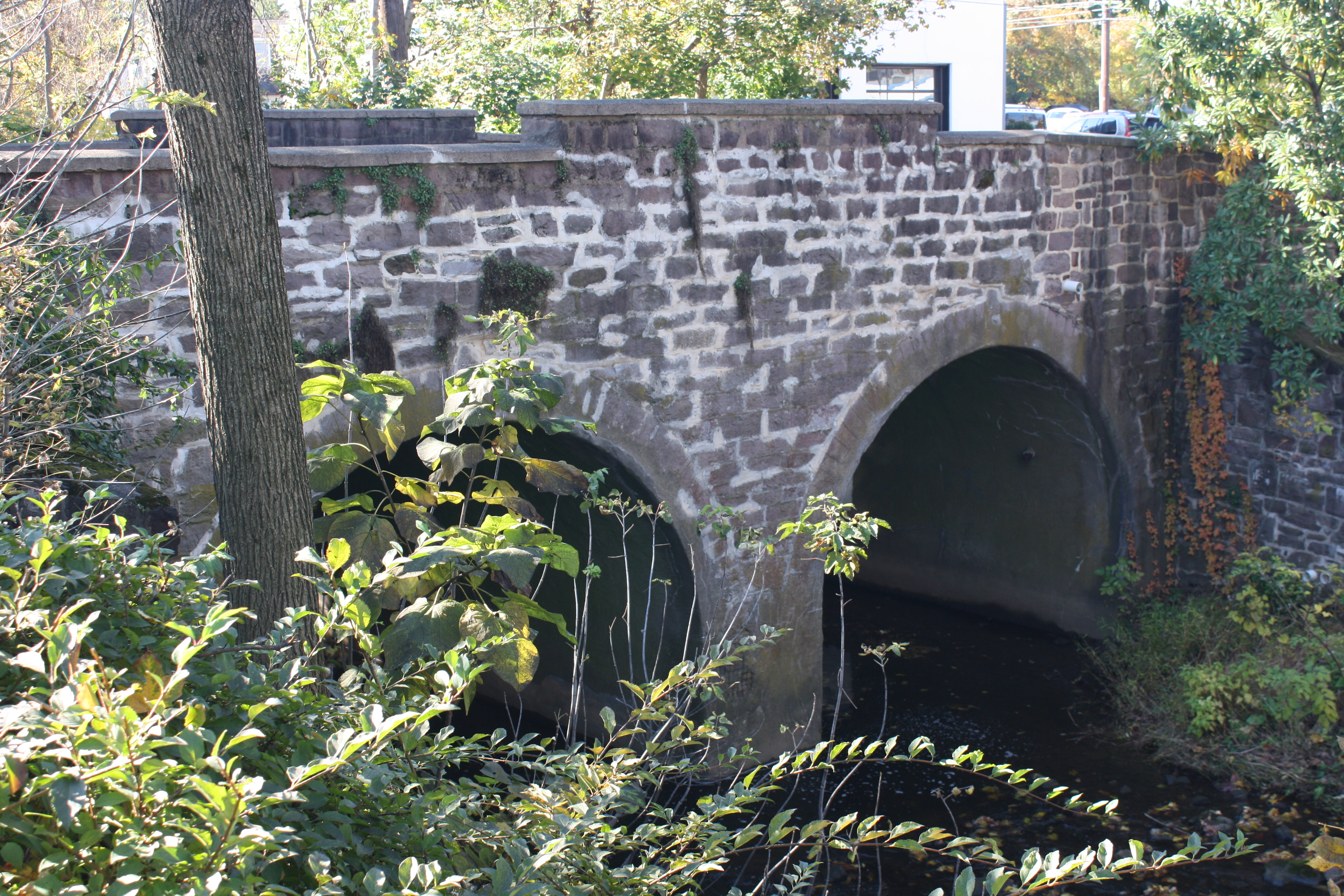
- Newtown Creek Bridge, October 2012

- Location within Pennsylvania Location within the United States
- Location: Richboro Road over Newtown Creek, Newtown, Pennsylvania
- Coordinates: 40°13′40″N 74°56′20″W
- Area: less than one acre
- Built: 1796
- Architectural style: Two span stone arch
- MPS: Highway Bridges Owned by the Commonwealth of Pennsylvania, Department of Transportation TR
- NRHP reference No.: 88000787
- Added to NRHP: June 22, 1988

Newtown Creek Bridge is a historic stone arch bridge located at Newtown, Bucks County, Pennsylvania. It spans Newtown Creek. It has two spans, each are 15 feet long, and was constructed in 1796. It was modified in 1875.

It was listed on the National Register of Historic Places in 1988.

== Gallery ==
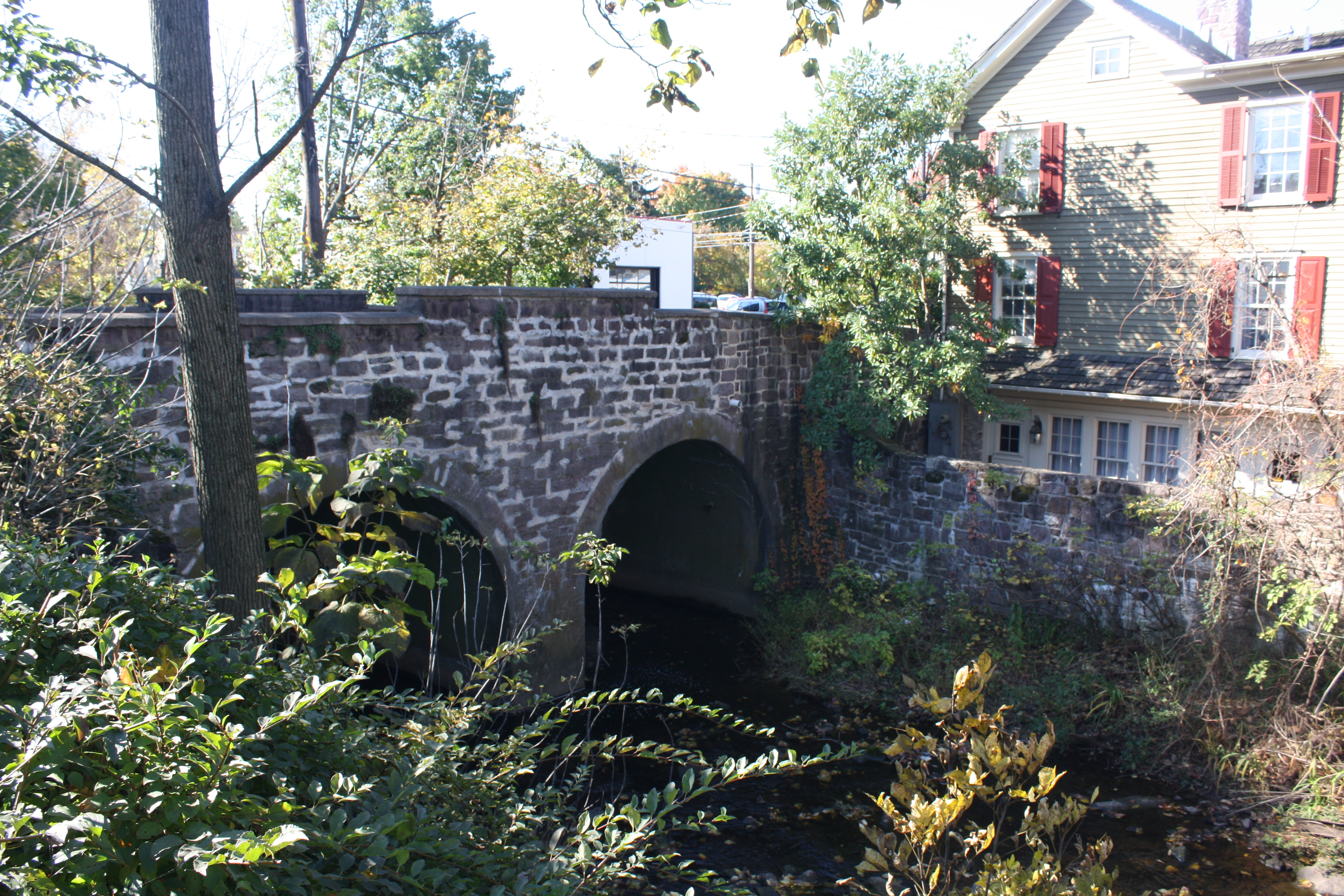

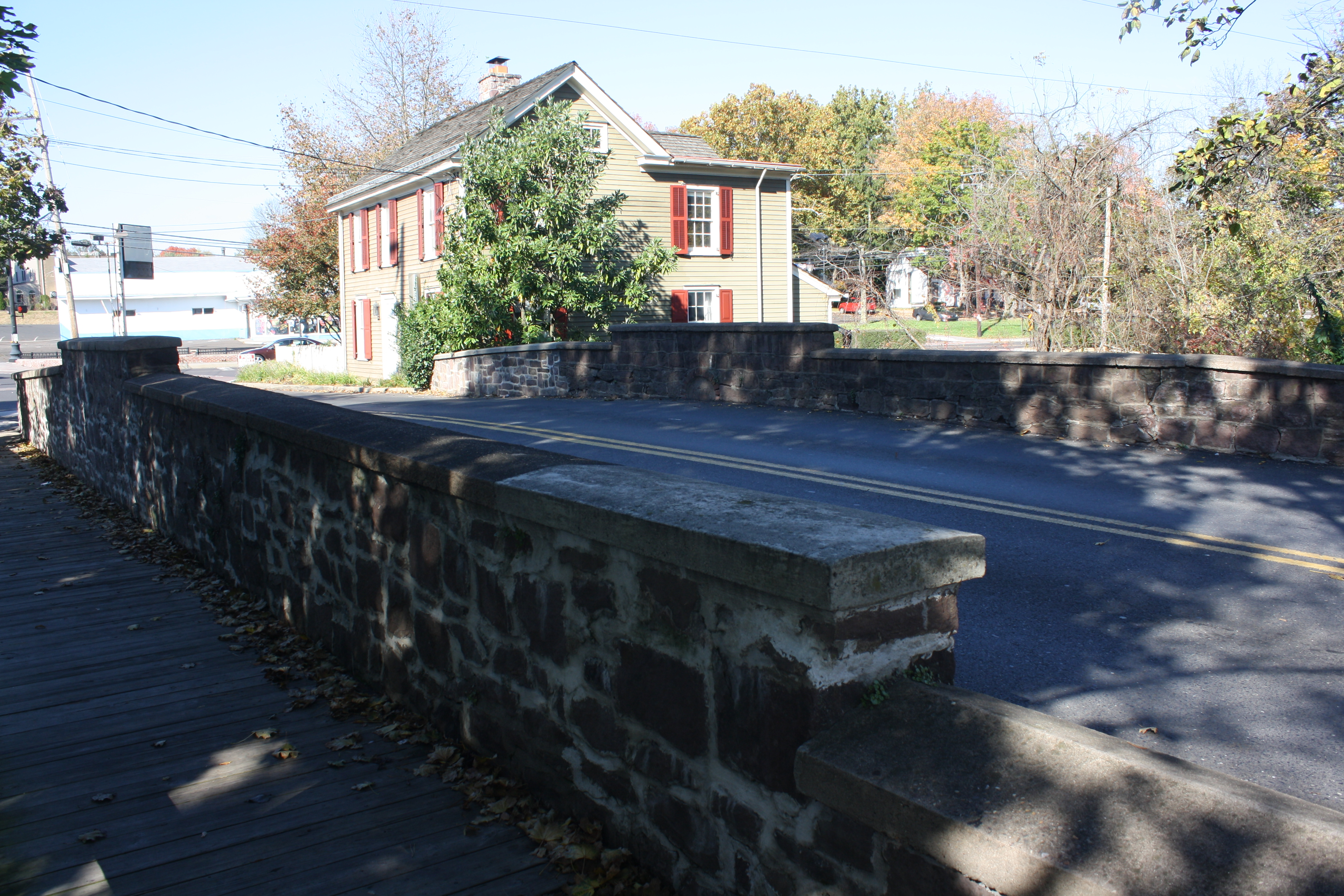
