= List of Delaware River tributaries =

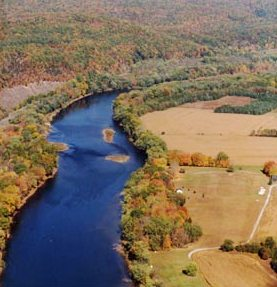
The Delaware River looking north above Walpack Bend near Walpack, New Jersey, where the river leaves the historic Minisink region, a buried valley eroded from the Marcellus Formation

The watershed of the Delaware River drains an area of 14,119 square miles (36,570 km^{2}) and encompasses 42 counties and 838 municipalities in five U.S. states, New York, New Jersey, Pennsylvania, Maryland, and Delaware. This total area constitutes approximately 0.4% of the land mass in the United States. The Delaware River rises in the Catskill Mountains in Upstate New York, flowing southward for 419 miles (674 km) into Delaware Bay where its waters enter the Atlantic Ocean near Cape May in New Jersey and Cape Henlopen in Delaware. There are 216 tributary streams and creeks, comprising an estimated 14,057 miles of streams and creeks, in the watershed.

The waters of the Delaware River's basin are used to sustain "fishing, transportation, power, cooling, recreation, and other industrial and residential purposes." While the watershed is home to 4.17 million people according to the 2000 U.S. census, these bodies of water provide drinking water to 17 million people, roughly 10% of the population of the United States. It is the 33rd largest river in the United States in terms of flow, but the nation's most heavily used rivers in daily volume of tonnage. The average annual flow rate of the Delaware is 11,700 cubic feet per second at Trenton, New Jersey.

== Tributaries ==
The main tributaries in New York are the Mongaup and Neversink rivers and Callicoon Creek. From Pennsylvania, the major tributaries are the Lackawaxen, Lehigh, and Schuylkill rivers. From New Jersey, the Big Flatbrook, Pequest, Musconetcong, and Maurice rivers, plus Oldmans, Raccoon and Rancocas creeks, flow into the Delaware.

Tributaries are arranged generally north to south from the source of the river to its mouth, its confluence with the Delaware River, tributaries within that rivers' watershed are mentioned in notes.

=== Tributaries in New York ===
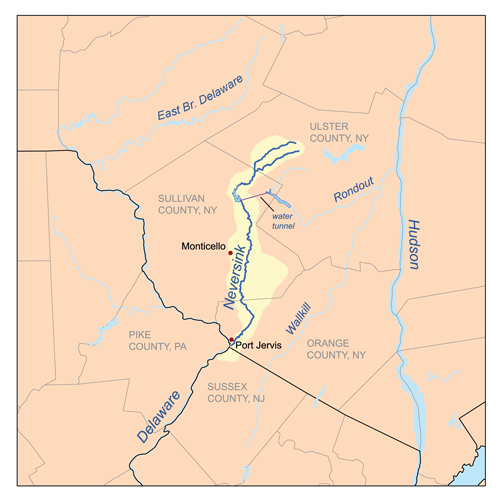
The Neversink River drainage basin

- West Branch Delaware River
  - Little Delaware River
- East Branch Delaware River
  - Beaver Kill
    - Willowemoc Creek
      - Little Beaver Kill
  - Tremper Kill
- Callicoon Creek
  - East Branch Callicoon Creek
  - North Branch Callicoon Creek
- Tenmile River
- Mongaup River
  - Black Brook
  - West Branch Mongaup River
  - Middle Mongaup River
  - East Mongaup River
- Neversink River
  - Basher Kill
  - Sheldrake Stream
  - East Branch Neversink River
  - West Branch Neversink River

=== Tributaries in Pennsylvania ===
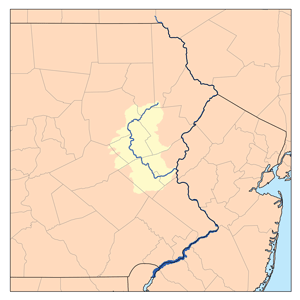
The Lehigh River drainage basin

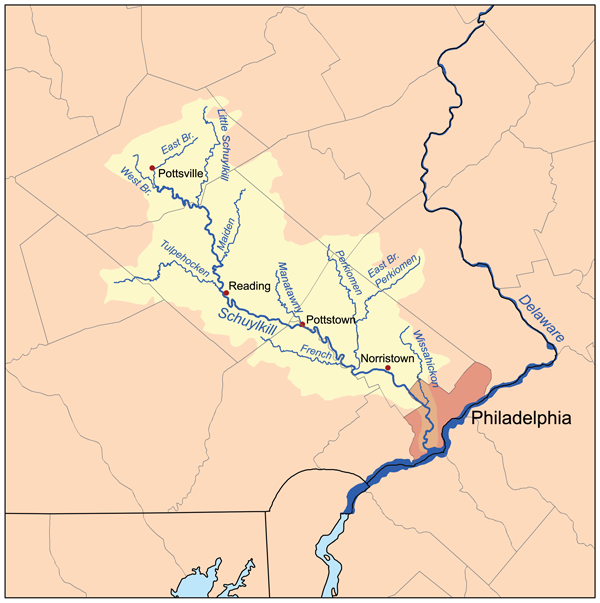
The Schuylkill River drainage basin

- West Branch Delaware River
  - Shehawken Creek
- Equinunk Creek
- Lackawaxen River
  - Wallenpaupack Creek
    - West Branch Wallenpaupack Creek
    - East Branch Wallenpaupack Creek
      - Bridge Creek
  - Middle Creek
  - Carley Brook
  - Dyberry Creek
  - Van Auken Creek
  - West Branch Lackawaxen River
    - Johnson Creek
- Shohola Creek
- Big Bushkill Creek
  - Little Bush Kill
  - Saw Creek
  - Rock Hill Creek
- Sawkill Creek
  - Dwarf Kill
- Raymondskill Creek
- Brodhead Creek
  - Marshalls Creek
  - Pocono Creek
    - McMichael Creek
  - Paradise Creek
  - Levitt Branch
  - Middle Branch Brodhead Creek
- Cherry Creek (along the Appalachian Trail)
- Caledonia Creek (along the Appalachian Trail)
- Martins Creek
- Bushkill Creek
- Lehigh River
  - Saucon Creek
  - Monocacy Creek
  - Little Lehigh Creek
    - Jordan Creek
    - Spring Creek
    - Swabia Creek
  - Catasauqua Creek
  - Coplay Creek
  - Hokendauqua Creek
    - Indian Creek
  - Trout Creek
  - Aquashicola Creek
    - Buckwha Creek
  - Lizard Creek
  - Pohopoco Creek
  - Mahoning Creek
  - Mauch Chunk Creek/White Bear Creek
  - Nesquehoning Creek
    - Jeans Run
  - Black Creek
    - Quakake Creek
    - Hazle Creek
  - Mud Run
  - Bear Creek
  - Tobyhanna Creek
    - Tunkhannock Creek
      - South Branch Tunkhannock Creek
- Cooks Creek
  - Hollow Run
- Rodges Run
- Gallows Run
- Falls Creek
- Swamp Creek
- Tinicum Creek
  - Rapp Creek
  - Beaver Creek
- Smithtown Creek
- Tohickon Creek
  - Dry Branch Creek
  - Beaver Run
    - Linking Run
  - Morgan Creek
  - Dimple Creek
  - Threemile Run
  - Haycock Creek
  - Mink Run
  - Deer Run
  - Wolf Run
  - Deep Run
  - Cabin Run
  - Geddes Run
- Hickory Creek
- Paunnacussing Creek
- Cuttalosa Creek
- Rabbit Run
- Aquetong Creek
- Dark Hollow Run
- Pidcock Creek
  - Curls Run
- Jericho Creek
- Houghs Creek
- Dyers Creek
- Buck Creek
  - Brock Creek
- Biles Creek
- Scotts Creek
- Martins Creek
- Mill Creek
  - Adams Hollow Creek
  - Black Ditch Creek
  - Queen Anne Creek
- Neshaminy Creek
  - West Branch Neshaminy Creek
    - Reading Creek
  - North Branch Neshaminy Creek
    - Pine Run
  - Mill Creek
  - Cooks Run
  - Little Neshaminy Creek
    - Park Creek
  - Mill Creek
    - Lahaska Creek
    - Watson Creek
    - Robin Run
  - Newtown Creek
  - Core Creek
  - Mill Creek
    - Ironworks Creek
    - Pine Run
- Poquessing Creek
  - Byberry Creek
  - Bloody Run
- Pennypack Creek
- Frankford Creek
  - Tacony Creek
  - Wingohocking Creek
- Cohocksink Creek
- Cohoquinoque Creek
- Schuylkill River
  - Mingo Creek (former Cobbs Creek tributary)
  - Mill Creek (Philadelphia)
  - Wissahickon Creek
    - Paper Mill Run
    - Cresheim Creek
    - Sandy Run
  - Mill Creek (Montgomery County, Pennsylvania)
  - Stoney Creek
  - Valley Creek
  - Perkiomen Creek
    - Skippack Creek
      - Towamencin Creek
    - East Branch Perkiomen Creek
    - Swamp Creek
    - Unami Creek
    - West Branch Perkiomen Creek
    - Hosensack Creek
  - Pickering Creek
  - French Creek
  - Scotts Run
  - Pigeon Creek
  - Manatawny Creek
    - Ironstone Creek
    - Little Manatawny Creek
  - Monocacy Creek
  - Hay Creek
  - Antietam Creek
  - Allegheny Creek
  - Angelica Creek
  - Wyomissing Creek
  - Tulpehocken Creek
    - Cacoosing Creek
    - Northkill Creek
      - Little Northkill Creek
      - Wolf Creek
  - Maiden Creek
    - Sacony Creek
    - Kistler Creek
    - Ontelaunee Creek
  - Irish Creek
  - Little Schuylkill River
    - Indian Run
    - Panther Creek
    - Pine Creek
  - West Branch Schuylkill River
    - West West Branch Schuylkill River
      - West Creek
  - Norwegian Creek
  - Mill Creek (Port Carbon, Pennsylvania)
  - Silver Creek
- Darby Creek
  - Stoney Creek
  - Muckinipattis Creek
  - Hermesprota Creek
  - Cobbs Creek
    - Naylors Run
    - Indian Creek
  - Ithan Creek
    - Meadowbrook Run
  - Little Darby Creek
- Crum Creek
  - Little Crum Creek
  - Trout Run
  - West Crum Creek
  - Whiskey Run
  - Richard's Run
- Ridley Creek
  - Vernon Run
  - Spring Run
  - Dismal Run
  - Hunters Run
- Chester Creek
  - West Branch Chester Creek
  - Goose Creek
- Stoney Creek
- Naamans Creek
- Christina River
  - Brandywine Creek
    - East Branch Brandywine Creek
      - Valley Creek
    - West Branch Brandywine Creek
      - Buck Run
        - Doe Run
  - White Clay Creek
    - Red Clay Creek
    - Mill Creek
    - Broad Run
      - Walnut Run

=== Tributaries in New Jersey ===
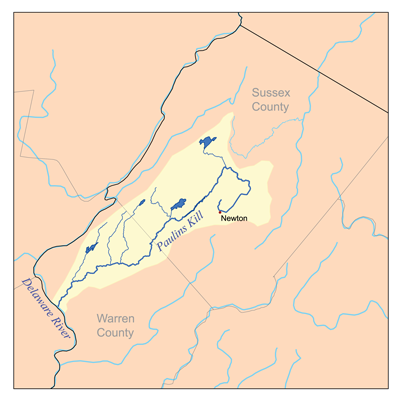
The Paulins Kill drainage basin

The Appalachian Trail crosses the following tributaries or the watersheds of these tributaries in New Jersey: (1) Flat Brook (Big Flat brook), (Little Flat Brook), Dunnfield Creek, Stony Brook (Shawpocussing Creek), Paulins Kill via its tributary Yards Creek and Jacksonburg Creek.

- Flat Brook
  - Big Flat Brook
  - Little Flat Brook
- Van Campens Creek
- Dunnfield Creek
- Stony Brook (Shawpocussing Creek)
- Paulins Kill
  - Yards Creek
- Pequest River
  - Beaver Brook
  - Bear Creek
- Lopatcong Creek
- Pohatcong Creek
- Musconetcong River
  - Lubbers Run
    - Punkhorn Creek
- Hakihokake Creek
- Harihokake Creek
- Nishisakawick Creek
- Little Nishisakawick Creek
- Lockatong Creek
- Wickecheoke Creek
- Alexauken Creek
- Swan Creek
- Moores Creek
- Fiddlers Creek
- Jacobs Creek
- Assunpink Creek
  - Shabakunk Creek
- Crosswicks Creek
- Assiscunk Creek
- Rancocas Creek
  - North Branch Rancocas Creek
    - Greenwood Branch
      - Bisphams Mill Creek
      - Pole Bridge Branch
      - Mount Misery Brook
  - South Branch Rancocas Creek
    - Friendship Creek
      - Burrs Mill Brook
    - Southwest Branch Rancocas Creek
- Pennsauken Creek
- Cooper River
- Big Timber Creek
- Woodbury Creek
- Mantua Creek
- Raccoon Creek
- Oldmans Creek
- Salem River
  - Fenwick Creek
  - Mannington Creek
  - Game Creek
- Alloway Creek

Photo	Tributary	River length	Watershed area	Notes and remarks
	Flat Brook	11.6-mile-long (18.7 km)		Flows into the Delaware at Flatbrookville, near Walpack Bend in Walpack Township, Sussex County, New Jersey; Tributaries include: Tillman Brook, Little Flat Brook, Beerskill, Big Flat Brook, Criss Brook, Forked Brook, Normanock Brook, Parker Brook, Stony Brook
	Paulins Kill	41.6-mile (66.9 km)	176.85 square miles (458.0 km^{2})	Flows into the Delaware near the Delaware Water Gap and Columbia in Knowlton Township in Warren County, New Jersey; Tributaries include: Lake Owassa, Culver's Lake, Dry Brook, Culver Brook (West Branch of the Paulins Kill), Trout Brook, Keen's Mill Brook, Neldon's Brook, Swartswood Lake, Blair Creek, Jacksonburg Creek, Susquehanna Creek, Dilts Creek, Walnut Creek, Yards Creek
	Pequest River	35.7-mile-long (57.5 km)	162.62 square miles (421.2 km^{2})	Flows into the Delaware at Belvidere in Warren County, New Jersey; Tributaries include: Pophandusing Creek, Beaver Brook, Mountain Lake Brook, Furnace Brook, Bear Creek, Trout Brook
	Musconetcong River	45.7-mile-long (73.5 km)		Flows into the Delaware at Riegelsville, 10 miles south of Phillipsburg in Warren County, New Jersey; Tributaries include: Lake Hopatcong, Lake Musconetcong, Punkhorn Creek, Lubbers Run

=== Tributaries in Delaware ===
- Naamans Creek
  - South Branch Naamans Creek
- Perkins Run
- Stoney Creek
- Shellpot Creek
  - Matson Run
  - Turkey Run
- Christina River
  - Brandywine Creek
    - Alapocas Run
    - Husbands Run
      - Willow Run
    - Wilson Run
    - Rocky Run
      - Hurricane Run
    - Carney Run
    - Ramsey Run
    - Beaver Creek
  - Little Mill Creek
    - Chestnut Run
    - Willow Run
  - Nonesuch Creek
  - White Clay Creek
    - Hershey Run
    - Red Clay Creek
      - Hyde Run
    - Mill Creek
    - Pike Creek
    - Middle Run
  - Leathermans Run
  - Muddy Run
    - Belltown Run
  - West Branch Christina River
    - Persimmon Run
  - East Branch Christina River
- Army Creek
- Tom Creek
- Red Lion Creek
  - Doll Run
- Cedar Creek
- Dragon Creek

== Tributaries of Delaware Bay ==
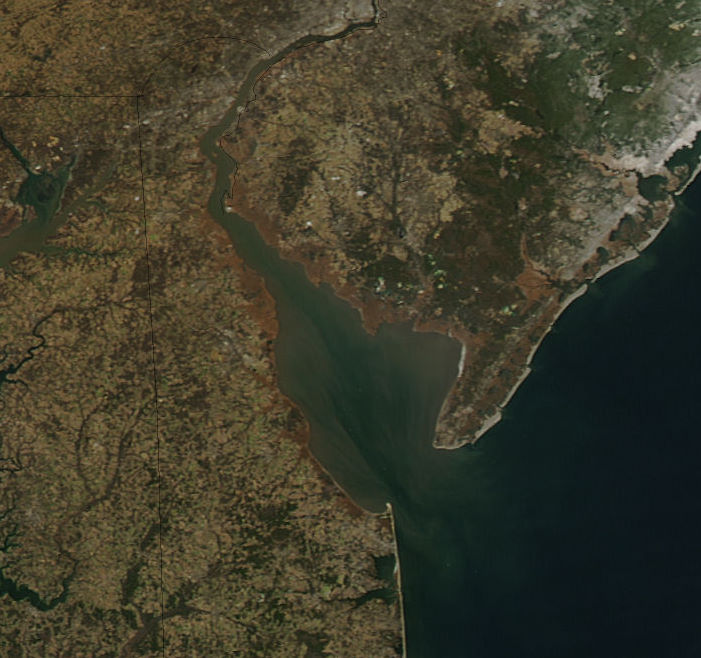
A satellite image of Delaware Bay, January 2011

Delaware Bay is a major estuary outlet of the Delaware River on the Northeast seaboard of the United States whose fresh water mixes for many miles with the waters of the Atlantic Ocean. The bay, as an estuary, forms a transitional zone between the river environment provided by the Delaware River and maritime environment of the Atlantic Ocean that is subject to both marine influences, such as tides, waves, and the influx of saline water; and riverine influences, such as flows of fresh water and sediment. Delaware Bay covers 782 square miles (2,030 km^{2}) in area. The bay is bordered by the State of New Jersey and the State of Delaware. The bay's outermost boundary separating it from the Atlantic are two capes: Cape Henlopen and Cape May.

=== Tributaries in New Jersey ===
- Stow Creek
- Cedar Creek
- Nantuxent Creek
- Oranoaken Creek
- Dividing Creek
- Cohansey River
- Back Creek
  - Ogden Creek
  - Abbots Creek
- Maurice River
  - Muskee Creek
  - Manumuskin River
  - Manantico Creek
  - Muddy Run
  - Scotland Run
  - Still Run
- West Creek
- East Creek
- Dennis Creek
  - Roaring Ditch
  - Sluice Creek
- Fishing Creek
  - Fulling Mill Stream

=== Tributaries in Delaware ===
- Saint Georges Creek
  - Scott Run
  - Joy Run
  - Crystal Run
- Augustine Creek
- Silver Run
- Appoquinimink River
  - The Big Ditch
  - Hangmans Run
  - Drawyer Creek
- Blackbird Creek
  - Fishing Creek
  - Beaver Branch
  - Barlow Branch
  - Sandom Branch
- Angle Rod Creek
- Smyrna River
  - Sawmill Branch
  - Corks Point Ditch
    - Morris Branch
  - Green Spring Branch
    - Massey Branch
  - Duck Creek
    - Providence Creek
      - Paw Paw Branch
- Taylors Gut
- Duck Creek
  - Quarter Gut
    - Hawkey Branch
- Leipsic River
  - Raymond Gut
  - Dyke Branch
  - Bennefield Branch
  - Spruances Branch
  - Snows Branch
  - Alston Branch
  - Willis Branch
- Simons River
  - Herring Branch
  - Green Creek
    - Muddy Branch
- Mahon River
  - Old Womans Gut
- Little River
- Lewis Ditch
- Sand Ditch
- St. Jones River
  - Cypress Branch
  - Tidbury Creek
  - Isaac Branch
  - Puncheon Run
  - Fork Branch
- Murderkill River
  - Spring Creek
    - Double Run
    - Hudson Branch
    - Pratt Branch
  - Ash Gut
  - Browns Branch
    - Ward Branch
  - Spring Branch
- Brockonbridge Gut
- Mispillion River
  - Fishing Branch
  - Swan Creek
  - Deep Branch
  - Mullet Run
  - Bowman Branch
  - Lednum Branch
  - Johnson Branch
  - Tantrough Branch
  - Beaverdam Branch
- Cedar Creek
  - Slaughter Creek
  - Beaverdam Branch
  - Church Branch
- Broadkill River
  - Canary Creek
  - Broadkill Sound
    - Primehook Creek
      - North Prong
      - Sowbridge Branch
        - Ingram Branch
  - Old Mill Creek
    - Fisher Creek
    - Black Hog Gut
    - Martin Branch
  - Crooked Creek
  - Doty Glade
  - Beaverdam Creek
  - Round Pole Branch
  - Ingram Branch
  - Pemberton Branch

== See also ==
- List of rivers of Delaware
- List of rivers of Maryland
- List of rivers of New Jersey
- List of rivers of New York
- List of rivers of Pennsylvania
