= Mount Misery =

Mount Misery or Misery Mountain may refer to:

== Summits ==
=== Australia ===
- Mount Misery (Queensland), on the boundary of Canungra and Biddadaba, Scenic Rim Region
- Mount Misery, South Australia, a peak in the Mount Lofty Ranges
- Mount Misery (Tasmania)
- Mount Misery, at the boundary of the Wathaurong territory in Victoria
- An early, unofficial name for the Sydney suburb Mount Pritchard, New South Wales
- Mount Misery, near Biddaddaba, Queensland

=== New Zealand ===
- Mount Misery, near Timaru in the Canterbury Region of the South Island
- Mount Misery (Two Thumb Range), a peak in the Two Thumb Range in the Canterbury Region of the South Island
- Mount Misery, in The Silverpeaks northwest of Dunedin in the South Island
- Mount Misery, near Owaka in the Otago Region of the South Island

=== United States ===
- Mount Misery (California), an elevation in Santa Clara County; location of the source of Thompson Creek
- Mount Misery (Washington state)
- Mount Misery, a rocky hill on the Pachaug Trail, Connecticut
- Mount Misery, a hill in the town of Auburn, New Hampshire
- Mount Misery, or Valley Forge Mountain, in Tredyffrin Township, Pennsylvania
- Mount Misery (Lincoln, Massachusetts), on the Bay Circuit Trail near Boston, Massachusetts
- Misery Mountain (Taconic Mountains), a mountain located in New York and Massachusetts
- Mount Misery, the nickname of the Howard County Courthouse in Ellicott City, Maryland

=== Elsewhere ===
- Mount Misery, in Country Harbour, Nova Scotia, Canada
- Mount Misery in Gibraltar had Mount Misery Battery on it
- Mount Misery, a former name of Mount Liamuiga on the island of Saint Kitts

== Other locations ==
- Pinelands Center at Mount Misery, or simply Mount Misery, a Methodist retreat center and camping site in the Pine Barrens of New Jersey, USA
  - Mount Misery Brook, a brook near the retreat center

== Other uses ==
- "Mount Misery", a song by The Zephyrs from their 2001 album When the Sky Comes Down It Comes Down on Your Head
- "Mount Misery", an episode of the Canadian animated television series Jimmy Two-Shoes
- "Misery Mountain", nickname for the Federal Correctional Institution, Hazelton in West Virginia
