= East Creek =

East Creek may refer to:

- East Creek (New Jersey), a tributary of Delaware Bay in Cape May County
- East Creek, Queensland, a locality in the Shire of Croydon, Australia

== See also ==
- East Canada Creek, a tributary of the Mohawk River in New York
- East Licking Creek, a tributary of Tuscarora Creek in Pennsylvania
- East Sandy Creek, a tributary of the Allegheny River in Pennsylvania
