= Scotts Creek =

Scotts Creek may refer to:

== United States ==
- Scotts Creek (California)
- Scotts Creek (Delaware River)
- Scotts Creek Elementary School
- Scotts Creek (Pennsylvania) on List of Delaware River tributaries
- Scotts Creek Railway on List of California street railroads
- An alternative name for Scott Creek (Santa Cruz County), California

== Australia ==
- Scotts Creek (New South Wales), see Pages River
- Scotts Creek, Victoria, a locality in Australia

== See also ==
- Scott Creek (disambiguation)
