= Rodges Run (Delaware River tributary) =

River in Pennsylvania, USA

- Rodges Run

Location
- Country: United States
- State: Pennsylvania
- County: Bucks
- Township: Durham

Physical characteristics
- Source
  - coordinates: 40°33′57″N 75°12′46″W
  - elevation: 395 feet (120 m)
- Mouth
  - coordinates: 40°34′24″N 75°11′32″W
  - elevation: 128 feet (39 m)
- Length: 1.32 miles (2.12 km)

Basin features
- Progression: Rodges Run → Delaware River
- River system: Delaware River
- Bridges: Cross Road, Mine Hill Road, Pennsylvania Route 611 (Easton Road)
- Slope: 202.27 feet per mile (38.309 m/km)

Rodges Run is a tributary of the Delaware River in Durham Township, Bucks County, Pennsylvania in the United States.

== Statistics ==
Rodges run was entered into the Geographic Names Information System by the U.S. Geological Survey on 30 August 1990 as identification number 1212006. It has a length of 1.32 miles (2.12 km); its headwaters rises at an elevation of 395 feet (120 m) and meets its confluence at the Delaware River's 173.1 River Mile at an elevation of 128 feet (39 m) for a total elevation drop of 267 feet (81 m) which give Rodges Run a slope of 202.27 feet per mile (19.8 meters per kilometer).

== Course ==
Rodges Run rises near the center of Durham Township east of Lehnenberg, and runs generally east northeast, then skirts south and east around an elevation before it drains into the Pennsylvania Canal (Delaware Division).

== Geology ==
Rodges Run rises in a bed of Hornblende Gneiss laid down during the Precambrian, the hornblende is mixed in with labradorite, the grains are about 1 to 2 mm in diameter. Then it moves into a bed of the Leithsville Formation consisting of dolomite, calcareous shale, and chert.

== Crossings and Bridges ==
Crossing	NBI Number	Length	Lanes	Spans	Material/Design	Built	Reconstructed	Latitude	Longitude
Cross Road	-	-	-	-	-	-	-	-	-
Lehnenberg Road and Mine Hill Road (western end of intersection)	44439	30.8 feet (9.4 m)	2	1	Concrete Culvert	2007	-	40°34'18"N	75°11'42"W
Lehnenberg Road and Mine Hill Road (eastern end of intersection)	44439	30.8 feet (9.4 m)	2	1	Concrete Culvert	2007	40°34'24"N	75°11'36"W	
Pennsylvania Route 611 (Easton Road)	-	-	-	-	-	-	-	-	-

== See also ==
- List of rivers of the United States
- List of rivers of Pennsylvania
- List of Delaware River tributaries
