= Kittatinny Formation =

- Stratigraphic range: Early Cambrian to Middle Ordovician
- Type: sedimentary
- Underlies: Jacksonburg Limestone
- Overlies: Hardyston Quartzite

Lithology
- Primary: limestone

Location
- Region: Appalachian Basin
- Extent: Pennsylvania, New Jersey

Type section
- Named by: H. D. Rogers, 1840

The Ordovician Kittatinny Formation or Kittatinny Limestone is a dolomitic limestone formation in New Jersey. The Kittatinny Limestones are located primarily in the Kittatinny Valley where it lies above the Ordovician Martinsburg Formation within the long valley running from Picatinny Arsenal in Rockaway Township, southwest toward Chester Township. It overlies the Cambrian Hardyston Quartzite.

The Kittatinny is now usually considered a Supergroup, rather than a Formation, as it includes several other Groups and Formations. Drake and Lyttle made this revision in 1980. The Supergroup includes the Leithsville Formation, Allentown Dolomite, and Beekmantown Group (which in turn includes the Stonehenge Limestone, Rickenbach Dolomite, Epler Formation, and Ontelaunee Formation). Richard Dalton wrote a more recent review of the stratigraphy of the Kittatinny.

The Kittatinny Limestone in New Jersey locally contains hydrocarbons and numerous accessory minerals including fluorite, sphalerite, arsenopyrite, galena, quartz, albite, and others. The Kittatinny is an exception to the general rule that Paleozoic rocks in this area are generally poor aquifers, since wells drilled into it produce relatively large flows of water.

The Kittatinny Formation is named for the Kittatinny Valley in which it is located. The formation is not connected to or associated with the geology of Kittatinny Mountain, the easternmost ridge of the Appalachians in New Jersey, which is composed of Shawangunk Formation, a silica-cemented combination of quartz arenite and quartz-pebble conglomerate; and the Bloomsburg Formation (known as the "Bloomsburg Red Beds"), consisting of red shale, siltstone, and sandstone.

== See also ==
- Swartswood State Park
