= Mill Creek (Neshaminy Creek tributary, Wrightstown Township) =

- Location within Pennsylvania

Location
- Country: United States
- State: Pennsylvania
- County: Bucks
- Township: Doylestown; Warrington

Physical characteristics
- Source: Lahaska Creek, Watson Creek
  - coordinates: 40°15′47″N 75°12′27″W
  - elevation: 217 feet (66 m)
- Mouth
  - coordinates: 40°16′30″N 75°9′43″W
  - elevation: 120 feet (37 m)
- Length: 6.08 miles (9.78 km)
- Basin size: 4.88 square miles (12.6 km^{2})

Basin features
- Progression: Mill Creek → Neshaminy Creek → Delaware River → Delaware Bay
- River system: Delaware River
- Landmarks: Lookaway Golf Club, Briarwood Day Camp
- Tributaries
  - right: Robin Run (4.39)
- Slope: 15.95 feet per mile (3.021 m/km)

Mill Creek is a tributary of Neshaminy Creek, one of three tributaries of the Neshaminy which all share the same name, and one of six in Bucks County, Pennsylvania which share the name. The Geographic Name Information System I.D. is 1181118, U.S. Department of the Interior Geological Survey I.D. is 02596.

== Course ==
Mill Creek begins with the confluence of Watson Creek and Lahaska Creek in the central portion of Buckingham Township a short distance south-southeast of the village of Buckingham, flows generally southeast for almost 2.5 miles (4.0 km) to the southwest of Buckingham Mountain where it turns to the east. At the confluence with an unnamed tributary from the left, Mill Creek turns southward for a little more than 0.5 miles (0.80 km). Meeting with another unnamed tributary from the left, it now flows southwestward about another 0.5 miles (0.80 km) until Robin Run joins at Mill Creek's 4.39 river mile from the right where it runs south-southwest for 1.33 miles (2.14 km) to its confluence at Neshaminy Creek's 23.65 river mile just south of Rushland.

== Geology ==
- Appalachian Highlands Division
  - Piedmont Province
    - Gettysburg-Newark Lowland Section
      - Leithsville Formation
      - Brunswick Formation
      - Allentown Formation
      - Lockatong Formation

At Mill Creek's headwaters, at the confluence of Lahaska Creek and Watson Creek, is the Allentown Formation, a sedimentary layer of rock deposited during the Cambrian. Mineralogy includes dolomite, limestone, chert, siltstone, oolite, stromatolites, and sharpstone conglomerate.

After a very short distance, it flows into the Leithsville Formation, a sedimentary layer also deposited during the Cambrian. Mineralogy includes dolomite, some containing sand or shale, calcareous shale, and chert.

It then flows into the Brunswick Formation, a sedimentary layer laid down during the Jurassic and Triassic. Mineralogy includes shale, mudstone, siltstone, green and brown shale.

Shortly before it reaches the Neshaminy, it flows into the Lockatong Formation, another formation of sedimentary rock. Mineralogy includes a dark-gray to black argillite, some zones of black shale, and some limestone and calcareous shale.

== Named Tributaries ==
- Robin Run
- Watson Creek
- Lahaska Creek

== Municipalities ==
- Wrightstown Township
- Buckingham Township

== Crossings and Bridges ==
Crossing	NBI Number	Length	Lanes	Spans	Material/Design	Built	Reconstructed	Latitude	Longitude
Swamp Road	40820	22 metres (72 ft)	2	1	Steel stringer/multi-beam or girder	2000	-	40°15'34.1"N	75°1'33.3"W
Forest Grove Road	7346	129.9 feet (39.6 m)	-	6	masonry arch-deck	1905	-	40°16'54"N	75°1'18"W
Smith Road (373)	7523	84 feet (26 m)	-	6	Prestressed concrete box beam or girder, concrete cast-in-place deck	2000	-	40°17'11"N	75°1'32"W
New Hope Road	70815	48.9 feet (14.9 m)	-	-	Prestressed concrete box beam or girder, concrete cast-in-place deck	1983	-	40°17'21"N	75°2'4"W
Lower Mountain Road	7532	68.9 feet (21.0 m)	-	-	Prestressed concrete box beam or girder, concrete cast-in-place deck	1982	-	40°18'5"N	75°2'56"W
Upper Mountain Road	7533	66.9 feet (20.4 m)	-	-	Prestressed concrete box beam or girder	1995	-	40°18'33"N	75°3'7"W

== See also ==
- List of rivers of Pennsylvania
- List of rivers of the United States
- List of Delaware River tributaries
