= Adams Hollow Creek =

- Adams Hollow Creek

Location
- Country: United States
- State: Pennsylvania
- County: Bucks
- Borough: Bristol

Physical characteristics
- Source
  - coordinates: 40°6′38″N 74°51′20″W
  - elevation: 20 feet (6.1 m)
- Mouth
  - coordinates: 40°5′58.5″N 74°50′40″W
  - elevation: 0 feet (0 m)
- Length: 1.25 miles (2.01 km)

Basin features
- Progression: Adams Hollow Creek → Delaware River → Delaware Bay
- River system: Delaware River
- Bridges: Radcliffe Street; Wood Street; Pond Street; U.S. Route 13
- Slope: 16 feet per mile (3.0 m/km)

Adams Hollow Creek is a short tributary of the Delaware River meeting with it just upstream from Mill Creek in Bristol, Bucks County, Pennsylvania.

== History ==
Former communities on the east side of the creek, Harriman and Pine Grove are now part of Bristol Borough.

The bridge carrying Radcliffe Street was built in 1911 to replace the former King's Bridge.

== Crossings and bridges ==
- Radcliffe Street - NBI Structure Number 7158, bridge is 22 feet (6.7 m) long, 2 lane, single span, steel stringer-multi-beam or girder, concrete cast-in-place deck, built 1911.

== See also ==
- List of rivers of Pennsylvania
- List of rivers of the United States
- List of Delaware River tributaries
