= Rock Run =

Rock Run may refer to:

- Rock Run, Alabama, an unincorporated community
- Rock Run (Martins Creek tributary), a stream in Pennsylvania
- Rock Run (Potomac River tributary), a stream in Maryland
- Rock Run School, a historic building near Fieldale, Virginia
- Rock Run Township, Stephenson County, Illinois
- Rock Run United Methodist Church, Harford County, Maryland
