= Watson Creek (Pennsylvania) =

- Watson Creek

Location
- Country: United States
- State: Pennsylvania
- County: Bucks
- Township: Buckingham

Physical characteristics
- Source
  - coordinates: 40°20′4″N 75°4′50″W
  - elevation: 360 feet (110 m)
- Mouth
  - coordinates: 40°18′50″N 75°3′22″W
  - elevation: 207 feet (63 m)
- Length: 2.48 miles (3.99 km)
- Basin size: 4.26 square miles (11.0 km^{2})

Basin features
- Progression: Watson Creek → Mill Creek → Neshaminy Creek → Delaware River → Delaware Bay
- River system: Delaware River
- Slope: 61.69 feet per mile (11.684 m/km)

Watson Creek is a tributary of Mill Creek (Neshaminy Creek, Delaware River, Wrightstown Township), Bucks County, Pennsylvania., contained totally in Buckingham Township, Bucks County, Pennsylvania flows to its confluence with Lahaska Creek to form Mill Creek. The Geographic Name Information System I.D. is 1190689, U.S. Department of the Interior Geological Survey I.D. is 02626.

== History ==
Watson Creek was named for the Watson family. Henry Watson was the owner of a large farm at the source who had three grist mills and a sawmill.

== Course ==
Watson Creek rises a short distance east of Doylestown Borough meandering generally south-southeast then turns and flows northeastward to Mill Creek's 6.05 river mile where it is joined by Lahaska Creek.

== Geology ==
- Appalachian Highlands Division
  - Piedmont Province
    - Gettysburg-Newark Lowland Section
      - Stockton Conglomerate
      - Stockton Formation
      - Beekmantown Group
      - Allentown Formation

Watson Creek begins in the Stockton Conglomerate, laid down during the Triassic, mineralogy includes conglomerate of quartz cobbles and boulders, and sandstone. Next, it flows through the Stockton Formation, also from the Triassic, consisting of sandstone, arkose sandstone, shale, siltstone, and mudstone. Next, it passes through the Beekmantown Group, deposited during the Ordovician, and consists of limestone and dolomite with some chert and calcite. Lastly, it meets with the Lahaska Creek in the Allentown Formation, which was deposited during the Cambrian, consisting of dolomite, limestone, chert, siltstone, with some oölites, stromatolites, and sharpstone.

== Municipalities ==
- Buckingham Township

== Fishing ==
Watson Creek is listed as a Class D Natural Reproduction Trout Stream by the Pennsylvania Fish and Boat Commission.

== Crossings and bridges ==
Crossing	NBI Number	Length	Lanes	Spans	Material/Design	Built	Reconstructed	Latitude	Longitude
Pennsylvania Route 263 (York Road)	6930	21 feet (6.4 m)	2	1	concrete cast-in-place, bituminous surface	1952			
Mill Road	7526	36.1 feet (11.0 m)	2	1	concrete arch-deck, concrete span, concrete cast-in-place	1912			
U.S. Route 202 (Doylestown Buckingham Pike)									
Church Road									

== See also ==
- List of rivers of Pennsylvania
- List of rivers of the United States
- List of Delaware River tributaries
