= Sowbridge Branch (Primehook Creek tributary) =

Stream in Delaware, USA

Sowbridge Branch Tributary to Primehook Creek
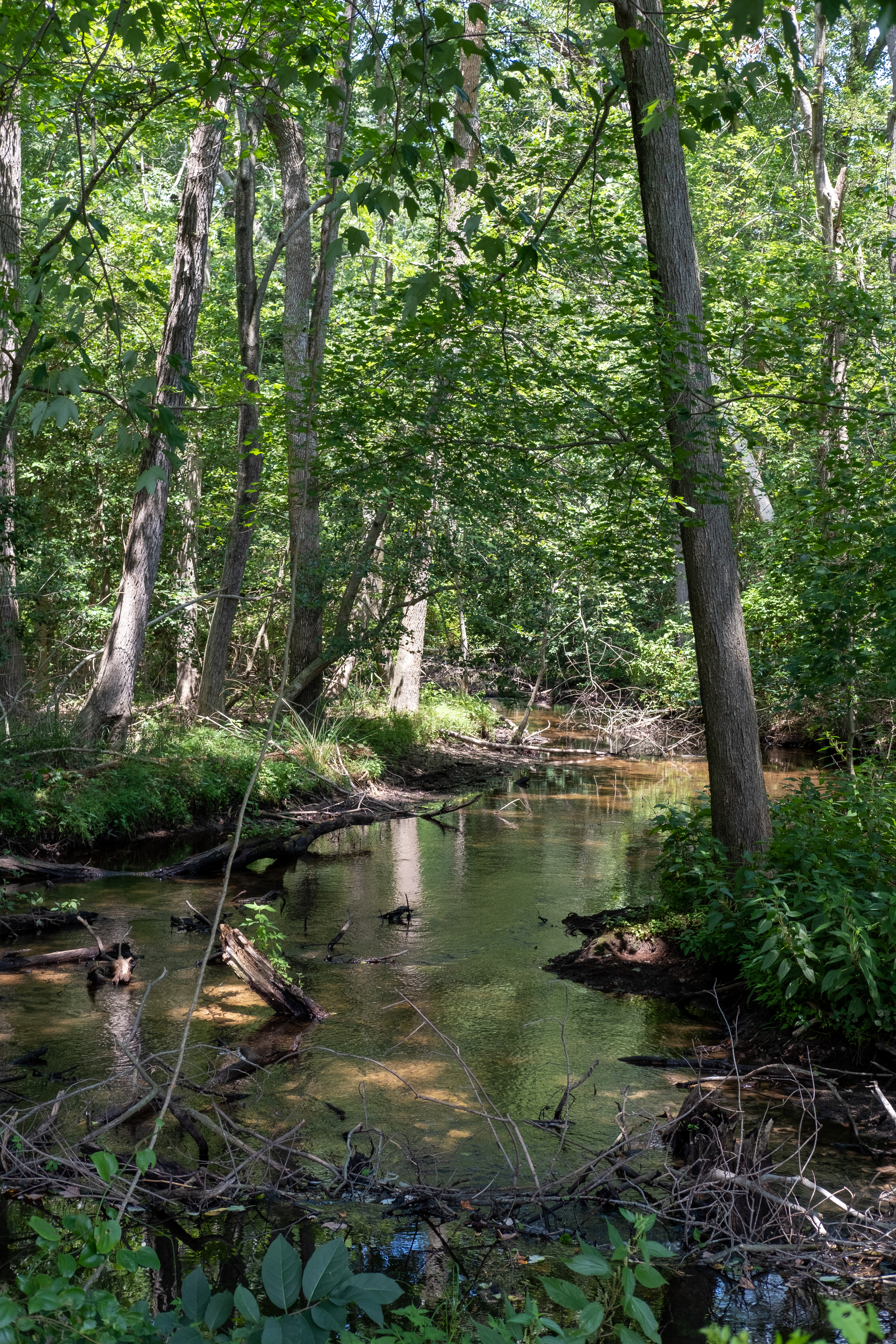
- Sowbridge Branch near Cedar Creek Road

- Location of Sowbridge Branch mouth Sowbridge Branch (Primehook Creek tributary) (the United States)

Location
- Country: United States
- State: Delaware
- County: Sussex

Physical characteristics
- Source: Gravelly Branch divide
  - location: about 0.5 miles southeast of Ellendale, Delaware
  - coordinates: 38°47′56″N 075°24′09″W
  - elevation: 50 ft (15 m)
- Mouth: Primehook Creek (Waples Pond)
  - location: Waples Pond Acres, Delaware
  - coordinates: 38°49′15″N 075°19′02″W
  - elevation: 4 ft (1.2 m)
- Length: 5.44 mi (8.75 km)
- Basin size: 7.86 square miles (20.4 km^{2})
- Discharge
  - location: Primehook Creek (Waples Pond)
  - average: 9.63 cu ft/s (0.273 m^{3}/s) at mouth with Primehook Creek (Waples Pond)

Basin features
- Progression: generally east
- River system: Broadkill River
- Tributaries
  - left: unnamed tributaries
  - right: Piney Branch
- Waterbodies: Reynolds Pond
- Bridges: Milton-Ellendale Highway, Holly Tree Road, Isaacs Road (DE 30), Cedar Creek Road

Sowbridge Branch is a 5.44 mi (8.75 km) long 2nd order tributary to Primehook Creek in Sussex County, Delaware.

== Variant names ==
According to the Geographic Names Information System, it has also been known historically as:

- Sawbridge Branch
- Sow Bridge Branch

== Course ==
Sowbridge Branch rises on the Gravelly Branch divide about 0.5 miles southeast of Ellendale, Delaware. Sowbridge Branch then flows generally east to meet Primehook Creek at Waples Pond.

== Watershed ==
Sowbridge Branch drains 7.86 square miles (20.4 km^{2}) of area, receives about 45.4 in/year of precipitation, has a topographic wetness index of 649.54 and is about 19% forested.
