= The Zephyrs =

Scottish indie band

- Origin: Edinburgh, Scotland
- Genres: Indie, shoegaze, folk rock
- Labels: Club AC30, Acuarela, Setanta, Rock Action
- Members: Stuart Nicol; David Nicol; Robert Dillam; Richard Hamill; Will Bates
- Past members: Emily Hall; Marcus MacKay; Charlie Clark; Eric Lindsay; Malcolm Cochrane; David Jeans; Stewart Campbell; Jonathan Kilgour; Gordon Kilgour

The Zephyrs are an Edinburgh, Scotland-based indie band. They have released six albums and two EPs containing their shoegazing folk-rock style.

== Band history ==
Brothers Stuart (vocals, guitar) and David Nicol (bass) had been playing music together for many years before forming The Zephyrs; they released their first album in 1999.

It's OK Not to Say Anything was released on the Edinburgh indie label Evol; it garnered the attention of Scottish post-rock band Mogwai who signed The Zephyrs to their own imprint Rock Action, which was then owned by SouthPaw Records.

In 2001 the band released their second album When the Sky Comes Down It Comes Down on Your Head (which included guest vocals from Mojave 3's Rachel Goswell) through SouthPaw Records. Unfortunately for the band, SouthPaw Records folded the week the album came out. Their publishing deal evaporated, as did the funding for the album's promotion and the band's tour.

In early 2002 The Zephyrs began work on a new album. At around this time, the Madrid-based record label Acuarela approached the band and invited The Zephyrs to play at the Primavera Sound music festival in Barcelona. In June of that year Acuarela released a four-song EP called The Love That Will Guide You Back Home.

By this time the band's line-up had gone through many changes. Only Stuart and David Nicol had remained in the band throughout. Malcolm Cochrane, the band's original lead guitarist who had left after the release of their first album, returned. David Jeans, a schoolfriend of the Nicol brothers, joined the band to play drums. Robert Dillam, formerly of Adorable, joined to play guitar. It was this five piece line-up that set off for Spain to embark on a two-week tour arranged by Acuarela.

Throughout this rocky period in the band's history Keith Cullen, of Setanta Records, had been offering managerial advice. He signed The Zephyrs to Setanta.

Working with long-time friend and producer Michael Brennan, the band completed their third album A Year to the Day which was released on 2 September 2003. Prior to the album release, in the summer of 2003, The Zephyrs performed at the Benicàssim Festival in Spain. Following a short tour of the UK in support of A Year To The Day, the band's live schedule lightened considerably. They played just five shows during 2004.

Much of 2004 was spent recording fourth album Bright Yellow Flowers on a Dark Double Bed which was released in June 2005 on Acuarela. The band appeared at the Benicàssim Festival again in the summer of 2005 and toured both Spain and Italy.

2006 through to 2009 were quiet years for The Zephyrs, although not completely inactive. A three-piece version of the band (Stuart and David Nicol with Robert Dillam on drums) appeared at the Triku Festival in Spain in October 2008. The band also teamed up with producer Michael Brennan for the first time since 2003 to record and mix songs for a fifth album. Fool of Regrets was released in September 2010 on London-based label Club AC30 preceded by the single Creative Faith and a short tour of the UK.

In mid 2014, The Zephyrs began preparations for a sixth album and a new gigging schedule with the Nicol brothers, Dillam on Drums, Richard Hamill on guitar, and Will Bates playing keyboards.

== Discography ==
=== Albums ===
- It's OK Not to Say Anything (1999, Evol)
- When the Sky Comes Down It Comes Down on Your Head (2001, SouthPaw)
- A Year to the Day (2004, Setanta)
- Bright Yellow Flowers on a Dark Double Bed (2005, Acuarela)
- Fool Of Regrets (2010, Club AC30)
- For Sapphire Needle (2023, Acuarela)

=== EPs ===
- Stargazer EP (2001, Rock Action)
- The Love That Will Guide You Back Home (2002, Acuarela)

=== Singles ===
- "Creative Faith" (2010, Club AC30)

=== Compilations ===
- A Quiet Riot (2002, Play It Again Sam) song: "Setting Sun"
- HomesleepHome 2 (2002, Homesleep) song: "Greyhound Going Somewhere"
- Acuarela Songs 2 (2003, Acuarela) song: "Make Me Lonely"
