= Swamp Creek (Delaware River tributary) =

- Swamp Creek

Physical characteristics
- Source
  - coordinates: 40°31′51″N 75°5′8″W
  - elevation: 360 feet (110 m)
- Mouth
  - location: Pennsylvania Canal (Delaware Division)
  - coordinates: 40°30′32″N 75°4′28″W
  - elevation: 118 feet (36 m)
- Length: 2.88 miles (4.63 km)

Basin features
- Progression: Swamp Creek→Delaware River
- River system: Delaware River
- Landmarks: Erwinna, Uhlerstown
- Bridges: Upper Tinicum Church Road, Upper Tinicum Church Road (second crossing), Geigel Hill Road, Geigel Hill Road (second crossing),

Swamp Creek is a tributary of the Delaware River in Tinicum Township, Bucks County, Pennsylvania in the United States.

== Course ==
Swamp Creek rises less than 1 mile (1.6 km) west of the Delaware River, just northwest of Uhlerstown and travels south for almost 2 miles (3.2 km) receiving three unnamed tributaries from the right bank, until it reaches just west of Erwinna where it receives another tributary from the right, then it turns to the southeast for about 0.5 miles (0.80 km) until it almost reaches the Pennsylvania Canal (Delaware Division) where it turn north for about 0.5 miles (0.80 km) running parallel to the canal, then turns and empties into the canal.

== Statistics ==
Swamp Creek was entered into the Geographic Names Information System on 30 August 1990 as identification number 1196207. It rises at an elevation of 360 feet (110 m), and meets the Delaware River at an elevation of 118 feet (36 m) with a length of 2.88 miles (4.63 km), which gives it an average slope of 84.03 feet per mile.

== Geology ==
- Appalachian Highlands Division
  - Piedmont Province
    - Gettysburg-Newark Lowland Section
      - Brunswick Formation
- Atlantic Plain
  - Atlantic Coastal Plain Province
    - Lowland and Intermediate Upland Section
      - Trenton Gravel

Swamp Creek rises in a stretch of the Brunswick Formation which consists of mudstone, siltstone, and shale. Mineralogy includes argillite and some hornfels. As it turns from the southeast leg to the north oriented leg it passes into the Trenton Gravel of the Atlantic Plain, consisting of sand and clay-silt layers.

== Crossings and Bridges ==
| Crossing | NBI Number | Length | Lanes | Spans | Material/Design | Built | Reconstructed | Latitude | Longitude |
|---|---|---|---|---|---|---|---|---|---|
| Upper Tinicum Church Road | 7144 | 7 metres (23 ft) | 2 | 1 | Concrete Tee Beam | 1914 | - | 40°30'34.8"N | 75°4'51.31"W |
| Upper Tinicum Church Road (second crossing) | - | - | - | - | - | - | - | - | - |
| Geigel Hill Road | 7142 | 9 metres (30 ft) | 2 | 1 | Continuous concrete stringer/multi-beam or girder | 1914 | - | 40°30'17.3"N | 75°4'48.8"W |
| Geigel Hill Road (second crossing) | 7143 | 13 metres (43 ft) | 1 | 1 | Steel Stringer/Multi-beam or Girder | 1996 | - | 40°30'6"N | 75°4'30"W |

== See also ==
- List of rivers of the United States
- List of rivers of Pennsylvania
- List of Delaware River tributaries
