= Queen Anne Creek =

- Queen Anne Creek

Location
- Country: United States
- State: Pennsylvania
- County: Bucks
- Township: Falls; Middletown; Bristol

Physical characteristics
- Source
  - coordinates: 40°11′34″N 74°50′51″W
  - elevation: 120 feet (37 m)
- Mouth
  - coordinates: 40°8′21″N 74°52′28″W
  - elevation: 39 feet (12 m)
- Length: 4.5 miles (7.2 km)

Basin features
- Progression: Queen Anne Creek → Mill Creek → Delaware River → Delaware Bay
- River system: Delaware River
- Landmarks: Fairless Hills; Queen Anne Park; Middletown Township Park
- Waterbodies: Caroline Lake
- Bridges: U.S. Route 1 (business)(Lincoln Highway); Austin Drive; Trenton Road; South Oxford Valley Road; South Olds Boulevard; Wistar Road; Woodbourne Road; New Falls Road; Bristol Oxford Valley Road
- Slope: 18 feet per mile (3.4 m/km)

Queen Anne Creek is a tributary of Mill Creek, part of the Delaware River drainage basin in Bucks County, Pennsylvania. Rising just north of Fallsington, it meets with its confluence with Mill Creek in Bristol Township.

== Statistics ==
The watershed of Queen Anne Creek is 6.64 square miles (17.2 km^{2}). The Geographic Name Information System I.D. is 1184538, U.S. Department of the Interior Geological Survey I.D. is 63801.

== Course ==
Rising in Falls Township just north of Fallsington at an elevation of 120 feet (37 m), Queen Anne Creek flows generally southwestward passing through Caroline Lake, then through Queen Anne Park, and Middletown Township Park to its confluence at Mill Creek's 5 River Mile at an elevation of 39 feet (12 m), resulting in an average slope of 18 feet per mile (3.4 m/km).

== Municipalities ==
- Bristol Township
- Middletown Township
- Falls Township

== Crossings and Bridges ==
Crossing	NBI Number	Length	Lanes	Spans	Material/Design	Built	Reconstructed	Latitude	Longitude
U.S. Route 1 (business)(Lincoln Highway)	-	-	-	-	-	-	-	-	-
Austin Drive	7604	22 feet (6.7 m)	2	1	Concrete culvert	1953	-	40°11'0"N	74°50'48"W
Trenton Road	7180	15 feet (4.6 m)	2	1	Prestressed concrete box beam or girders - multiple	1957	2011	40°10'10"N	74°52'28"W
South Oxford Valley Road	7291	9 feet (2.7 m)	2	1	Prestressed concrete box beam or girders - multiple	1954	2009	40°10'27"N	74°51'22"W
South Olds Boulevard	7607	29.9 feet (9.1 m)	2	4	Steel culvert	1953	-	40°10'18"N	74°51'52"W
Wistar Road	7588	136.2 feet (41.5 m)	2	1	Prestressed concrete stringer/multi-beam girder	1978	-	40°9'51"N	74°51'36"W
Woodbourne Road	7241	42 feet (13 m)	2	2	Prestreesed concrete box beam or girders - multiple	1955	1990	40°9'23.9"N	74°51'44.55"W
New Falls Road	7163	118.1 feet (36.0 m)	4	2	Prestreesed concrete box beam or girders - multiple	1960	-	40°8'32"N	74°52'22"W
Bristol Oxford Valley Road	-	-	-	-	-	-	-	-	-

== See also ==
- List of rivers of Pennsylvania
- List of rivers of the United States
- List of Delaware River tributaries
