= Robin Run =

- Location within Pennsylvania

Location
- Country: United States
- State: Pennsylvania
- County: Bucks
- Township: Wrightstown, Buckingham

Physical characteristics
- Source
  - coordinates: 40°17′36″N 75°4′8″W
  - elevation: 320 feet (98 m)
- Mouth
  - coordinates: 40°16′18″N 75°1′34″W
  - elevation: 161 feet (49 m)
- Length: 2.01 miles (3.23 km)
- Basin size: 2.27 square miles (5.9 km^{2})

Basin features
- Progression: Robin Run → Mill Creek → Delaware River → Delaware Bay
- River system: Delaware River
- Waterbodies: Robin Run Lake
- Slope: 76.1 feet per mile (14.41 m/km)

Robin Run is a dammed headwater major tributary of the Delaware River with a drainage area of 22.69 square miles that is 1.69 miles north 1.69 miles north of Mill Creek's Confluence with the Neshaminy Creek on the border of Buckingham and Wrightstown Townships), The headwaters originate in Buckingham Township, Bucks County, Pennsylvania and the stream flows generally southeast to its confluence with Mill Creek in Wrightstown Township.

Major tributaries of the Upper and Middle Neshaminy Creek include the West and North Branch of Neshaminy Creek, Pine Run, Cooks Run, Mill Creek, Lahaska Creek, Robin Run, Watson Creek, and Newtown Creek, all of which flow into the Main Stem Neshaminy Creek.

The Geographic Name Information System I.D. is 1185219, U.S. Department of the Interior Geological Survey I.D. is 02598.

Previously, the Neshaminy Water Resources Authority oversaw the dam, however, Bucks County assumed control and oversight of the dam(s). Robin Run in Buckingham Township is one of six county dams, including the Newtown Creek in Newtown Township, Nockamixon Dam in Pine Run in Doylestown, and, Core Creek in Middletown Township. For Robin Run, a regression analysis correlating existing discharges with drainage area was developed prior to construction of the dam.

In 2009, Bucks County workers performed an unauthorized valve repair that flushed "tens of thousands" of healthy fish out of the reservoir to suffer and die on the banks downstream. Bucks County was fined by the PA DEP for the illegal action, however, the fine was unpaid, or was paid with the proceeds not used to correct the damage and replace the fish that were killed. As a result, the lake has not been re-stocked with fish and remains a depressing place to go fishing.

== Course ==
Robin Run rises a short distance northwest of Lower Mountain Road in Buckingham Township, flowing southeast flowing through a small unnamed pond then through Robin Run Lake, a dammed reservoir built by Bucks County in 1971, then passing into Wrightstown Township, where it meets its confluence with Mill Creek at 1.55 river mile. There are no other significant tributaries.

== Geology ==
Robin Run begins in the Lockatong Formation, a sedimentary rock layer deposited in Pennsylvania, New Jersey, and New York during the Triassic Period. Mineralogy includes argillite, some shale, limestone, and calcareous shale named after the Lockatong Creek in Hunterdon County, New Jersey.

In 2018, the United States Geological Survey was awarded a $60,000 grant to conduct a dam assessment and watershed study of Robin Run.

The Lockatong is defined as a light to dark gray, greenish-gray, and black very fine grained sandstone, silty argillite, and laminated mudstone. In New Jersey, the cyclic nature of the formation is noted with hornfels near diabase and basalt flows.

The Lockatong is often described as lake or litoral sediments. The interfingering nature of the sediments with the surrounding Stockton Formation and Passaic Formation suggests that these littoral environments shifted as climate or as the dynamic terrane of the area developed. The deposition of calcitic sediments is indicative of a climate with high evaporation rates.

- Appalachian Highlands Division
  - Piedmont Province
    - Gettysburg-Newark Lowland Section
      - Lockatong Formation
      - Brunswick Formation

It very quickly finds itself in the Brunswick Formation, a sedimentary rock layer deposited during the Jurassic and Triassic. Mineralogy includes shale, mudstone, siltstone, argillite, some hornfel.

== Municipalities ==
- Wrightstown Township
- Buckingham Township

== Crossings and Bridges ==
Crossing	NBI Number	Length	Lanes	Spans	Material/Design	Built	Reconstructed	Latitude	Longitude
Smith Road (local road 373)	7524	23 feet (7.0 m)	-	-	Continuous concrete stringer/multi-beam or girder, bituminous surface	1927	-	40°16'36"N	75°1'58"W
Creamery Road	-	-	-	-	-	-	-	-	-
Lower Mountain Road	-	-	-	-	-	-	-	-	-

== See also ==
- List of rivers of Pennsylvania
- List of rivers of the United States
- List of Delaware River tributaries
