= Rock Run (Martins Creek tributary) =

- Rock Run

Location
- Country: United States
- State: Pennsylvania
- County: Bucks
- Township: Lower Makefield; Falls

Physical characteristics
- Source
  - coordinates: 40°12′24″N 74°50′38″W
  - elevation: 150 feet (46 m)
- Mouth
  - coordinates: 40°10′36″N 74°48′39″W
  - elevation: 33 feet (10 m)
- Length: 4.81 miles (7.74 km)
- Basin size: 4.87 square miles (12.6 km^{2})

Basin features
- Progression: Rock Run → Martins Creek → Delaware River → Delaware Bay
- River system: Delaware River
- Bridges: Stony Hill Road; David Terrace; Esther Lane; Derbyshire Road; Makefield Road; Big Oak Road; Kent Drive; Valley Road; Alden Avenue; West Trenton Avenue; Pine Grove Road; U.S. Route 1 (Lincoln Highway); SEPTA Railroad; Newbold Road; Tyburn Road
- Slope
- 24.32 feet per mile (4.606 m/km)

Rock Run is a tributary of Martins Creek in Lower Makefield Township in Bucks County, Pennsylvania in the United States.

== Statistics ==
Rock Run was entered into the Geographic Names Information System of the U.S. Geological Survey on 2 August 1979 as identification number 1185276. It is also listed in the Pennsylvania Gazetteer of Streams as identification number 02922.

== Course ==
Rock Run rises near Big Oak Road and Stony Hill Road in the southern portion of Lower Makefield Township at an elevation of approximately 150 feet (46 m) and is generally east oriented until river mile 2.87 where it makes a 90° turn to the right flowing south as it receives a tributary from the left. After about a mile it then turns east, then south and southwest until it discharges at Martins Creek's 3.20 river mile.

== Geology ==
- Atlantic Plain
  - Atlantic Coastal Plain Province
    - Lowland and Intermediate Upland Section
      - Trenton Gravel
      - Pensauken and Bridgeton Formations

Rock Run rises in the Felsic Gneiss formation laid during the Precambrian, light buff to pink and medium to fine grained rock, mineralogy includes quartz, microcline, pyroxene, and biotite. As it flows east, it runs into the Pensauken and Bridgeton Formations laid down during the Tertiary period, yellow to reddish brown feldspathic quartz sand, coarse gravel, and boulder. Then it finally flows into the Trenton Gravel Formation from the Quaternary, consisting of feldspathic quartz sand which is reddish brown, yellow, and white, with some beds of gravel.

== Crossings and Bridges ==
Crossing	NBI Number	Length	Lanes	Spans	Material/Design	Built	Reconstructed	Latitude	Longitude
Stony Hill Road	-	-	-	-	-	-	-	-	-
David Terrace	-	-	-	-	-	-	-	-	-
Esther Lane	-	-	-	-	-	-	-	-	-
Derbyshire Road	-	-	-	-	-	-	-	-	-
Makefield Road	-	-	-	-	-	-	-	-	-
Big Oak Road	7198	10 metres (33 ft)	2	2	Concrete slab	1955	-	40°12'32"N	74°49'8.64"W
Kent Drive	-	-	-	-	-	-	-	-	-
Valley Road	-	-	-	-	-	-	-	-	-
Alden Avenue	7606	8 metres (26 ft)	2	1	Prestressed concrete box beam or girders - multiple	1962	-	40°12'17.1"N	74°48'41"W
West Trenton Avenue	7219	9 metres (30 ft)	2	1	Concrete continuous stringer/multi-beam or girder	1920	1940	40°12'6.2"N	74°48'33.8"W
Pine Grove Road	7310	10 metres (33 ft)	2	1	Concrete Tee beam	1957	-	40°11'57.2"N	74°48'10.27"W
U.S. Route 1 (Lincoln Highway)	6746	10 metres (33 ft)	3	1	Prestressed concrete box beam or girders - single or spread	1954	1985	40°11'49.1"N	74°47'53.25"W
SEPTA Railroad	-	-	-	-	-	-	-	-	-
Newbold Road	7355	18 metres (59 ft)	2	2	Concrete Tee Beam	1954	-	40°11'36.7"N	74°47'53.93"W
Tyburn Road	7184	26 metres (85 ft)	2	2	Concrete tee beam	1954	-	40°10'50.2"N	74°48'24.87"W

== See also ==
- List of rivers of the United States
- List of rivers of Pennsylvania
- List of Delaware River tributaries
