= Hardyston Quartzite =

Bedrock unit in Pennsylvania and New Jersey, US

- Stratigraphic range: Cambrian
- Type: Metamorphic
- Unit of: Leithsville Formation
- Underlies: Kittatinny Supergroup and Leithsville Formation
- Overlies: Wissahickon Formation

Lithology
- Primary: Quartzite
- Other: Limestone, shale, conglomerate

Location
- Region: Pennsylvania, New Jersey
- Country: United States
- Extent: Appalachian Basin

Type section
- Named for: Hardyston Township, New Jersey
- Named by: Wolff & Brooks
- Year defined: 1898

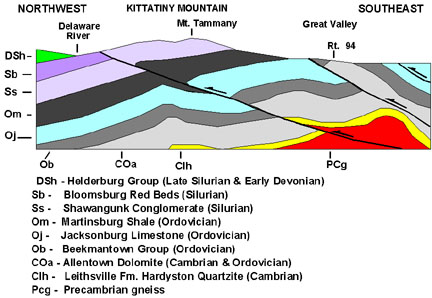
Kittatinny Mountain cross section, including the Hardyston Quartzite

The Cambrian Hardyston Formation or Hardyston Quartzite is a mapped bedrock unit in Pennsylvania and New Jersey.

It was originally described by Wolff and Brooks in 1898, where two outcrops in Hardyston Township, Sussex County, New Jersey, were described. They originally named it the Hardistonville quartzite, but the name was later changed by Kummel and Weller in 1901 to Hardiston quartzite, and changed again by the same authors a year later to Hardyston quartzite.

== Description ==
Richard Dalton described the Hardyston Formation in 1989 as having a varying lithology. It is composed of a vitreous, light pink, steel gray or brown, locally arkosic, fine to coarse-grained, resistant quartzite. Pebble conglomerate is common at the base of the formation. Locally, where the unit is less than 10 ft thick, it is a fine- to medium-grained, gray, pyritic quartzite, grading into a dark-gray dolomitic sandstone.

=== Stratigraphy ===
The Hardyston unconformably overlies Precambrian crystalline basement rocks where it was deposited on an irregular surface and fills only the troughs or depressions. It gradationally underlies the Leithsville Formation of the Kittatinny Supergroup.

The Hardyston occurs in New Jersey only in the highly folded and faulted New Jersey Highlands, northeast of the much younger Mesozoic Newark Basin.

Miller and Myers extended the formation into Pennsylvania in 1939, where it underlies the Tomstown Dolomite.

=== Notable outcrops ===
- Cushion Peak, Berks County, Pennsylvania - the Hardyston has been thrust faulted over the limestone valley at this site

== Age ==
Relative age dating places the Hardyston in the Early Cambrian.

=== Fossil content ===
Trilobites have been found in the calcareous sandstone beds of the formation. One genus is Olenellus.
