= Martins Creek (Delaware River tributary, Bucks County) =

- Martins Creek

Location
- Country: United States
- State: Pennsylvania
- County: Bucks
- Township: Falls

Physical characteristics
- Source
  - coordinates: 40°11′18″N 74°50′11″W
  - elevation: 100 feet (30 m)
- Mouth
  - coordinates: 40°8′3″N 74°48′56″W
  - elevation: 0 feet (0 m)
- Length: 5.11 miles (8.22 km)
- Basin size: 11.5 square miles (30 km^{2})

Basin features
- Progression: Martins Creek → Delaware River → Delaware Bay
- River system: Delaware River
- Landmarks: Fairless Hills, Levittown
- Tributaries
  - left: Rock Run
- Bridges: Trenton Road; Vermillion Way; New Falls Road; Thornridge Way; Falls Tullytown Road; U.S. Route 13; East Penn Valley Road; Mill Creek Road; Old Bristol Pike; Bordentown Road (Main Street, Tullytown)
- Slope: 19.57 feet per mile (3.706 m/km)

Martins Creek is a tributary of the Delaware River in Bucks County, Pennsylvania, meeting its confluence at the Delaware River 122 river mile.

== Statistics ==
Martins Creek has a watershed of 11.5 square miles (30 km^{2}). It was entered into the Geographic Names Information System of the U.S. Geological Survey as identification number 1180503, U.S. Department of the Interior Geological Survey I.D. is 02920.

== Course ==
Martins Creek is contained wholly with in Falls Township. It rises just north of Trenton Road in the north portion of the township at an elevation of 100 feet (30 m) and flows southeast while joining with two tributaries, one from the left and one from the right. Just after it passes under New Falls Road, it joins with another unnamed tributary from the right, at which it makes a left turn then bends right again flowing southeast until it passes under U.S. Route 13 where it meets with Rock Run from the left where Martins turns right flowing almost due south. Just north of Mill Creek road it connects with the Pennsylvania Canal (Delaware Division) and continues on the other side of the canal, flowing south until it meets at the Delaware River's 122.4 river mile at an elevation of 0 feet (0 m), resulting in an average slope of 19.57 feet per mile (3.706 m/km).

== Municipalities ==
- Falls Township

== Crossings and bridges ==
Crossing	NBI Number	Length	Lanes	Spans	Material/Design	Built	Reconstructed	Latitude	Longitude
Trenton Road	-	-	-	-	-	-	-	-	-
Vermillion Way	-	-	-	-	-	-	-	-	-
New Falls Road	7164	13 metres (43 ft)	2	1	prestressed concrete box beam or girders - multiple	1957	2011	40°10'50.1"N	74°49'25.49"W
Thornridge Way	-	-	-	-	-	-	-	-	-
Falls Tulleytown Road	6769	13 metres (43 ft)	2	1	prestressed concrete box beam or girders - multiple	1955	-	40°9'24.8"W	74°48'44.7"W
U.S. Route 13	6772	12 metres (39 ft)	2	1	Concrete Tee Beam	1955	2004	40°10'38.2"N	74°48'43.7"W
East Penn Valley Road	7290	12 metres (39 ft)	2	2	concrete culvert	1978	-	40°10'18"N	74°48'12"W
Mill Creek Road	7489	24 metres (79 ft)	2	2	concrete culvert	1961	-	40°9'26.8"N	74°48'24"W
Old Bristol Pike	7292	14 metres (46 ft)	2	1	Concrete Tee Beam	1945	-	40°9'0.2"N	74°48'33.44"W
Bordentown Road (Main Street, Tullytown)	7295	11 metres (36 ft)	2	1	1901	1979	-	-	-

== See also ==
- List of rivers of Pennsylvania
- List of rivers of the United States
- List of Delaware River tributaries
