= Scott Creek =

Scott Creek may refer to:

- Scott Creek, South Australia
- Scott Creek Conservation Park in South Australia
- Scott Creek Middle School in Coquitlam, British Columbia, Canada
- Scott Creek (Santa Cruz County), a beach and stream in Santa Cruz County, California, USA
- Scott Creek (Jackson County, North Carolina)
- Scott Creek (Trent River tributary), a stream in Jones County, North Carolina

== See also ==
- Scotts Creek (disambiguation)
