= Lahaska Creek =

Stream in Wrightstown Township, Pennsylvania

Lahaska Creek Randalls Creek, Randalls Run, Randals Run
- Location within Pennsylvania
- Native name: Lackawissa (Unami); Lahaskeekee (Unami)

Location
- Country: United States
- State: Pennsylvania
- County: Bucks
- Township: Solebury Township, Buckingham Township

Physical characteristics
- Source
  - coordinates: 40°21′25″N 75°1′58″W
  - elevation: 310 feet (94 m)
- Mouth
  - coordinates: 40°18′47″N 75°3′23″W
  - elevation: 210 feet (64 m)
- Length: 3.04 miles (4.89 km)
- Basin size: 6.97 square miles (18.1 km^{2})

Basin features
- Progression: Lahaska Creek → Mill Creek → Neshaminy Creek → Delaware River → Delaware Bay
- River system: Delaware River
- Landmarks: Holicong Park
- Slope: 32.89 feet per mile (6.229 m/km)

Lahaska Creek (Lackawissa or Lahaskeekee) is a tributary of Mill Creek in Wrightstown Township, Bucks County, Pennsylvania. The Geographic Name Information System I.D. is 1178763, U.S. Department of the Interior Geological Survey I.D. is 02632.

== History ==
The area was originally inhabited by the Lenape native americans as Lackawissa or Lahaskeekee, "the place of much writing". In 1718, Richard Mitchell purchased 70 acres (28 hectares) and built a mill. It was replaced later by another mill known as Rush Valley Mills. After Mitchell, it was owned by Eldad Roberts, then by Joseph Watson.

== Course ==
Lahaska Creek rises near the southwest border of Solebury Township from an unnamed pond north of the village of Lahaska. Flowing just a little over 100 feet (30 m), it enters Buckingham Township running southwest, then south, then southwest again, runs through five more ponds, and is supplied by two unnamed tributaries before its junction with Watson Creek forming Mill Creek at the Mill Creek 6.80 river mile.

== Geology ==
- Atlantic Plain
  - Piedmont Province
    - Stockton conglomerate
    - Stockton Formation
    - Beekmantown Group
    - Allentown Formation

The headwaters of Lahaska Creek begins in the Stockton conglomerate from the Triassic consisting of conglomerate and conglomeratic sandstone. Mineralogy is mostly quartz.

It quickly moves into the Stockton Formation also from the Triassic, which consists of sandstone, arkosic sandstone, shale, siltstone, and mudstone.

It then very briefly flows through a small portion of the Beekmantown Group, from the Ordovician, a layer of limestone containing dolomite, and chert.

Then it spends most of its time in the Allentown Formation, from the Cambrian. The Allentown consists of dolomite and impure limestone, siltstone containing calcium carbonate, oolites, stromatolites, and sharpstone.

== Municipalities ==
- Solebury Township
- Buckingham Township

== Crossings and Bridges ==
- Pennsylvania Route 413 (Durham Road)
- Quarry Road
- Holicong Road (local route 391)
- U.S. Route 202 (Pennsylvania Route 263, York Road) - NBI Structure Number 6932, bridge is 20 feet (6.1 m), 2 lane, single span, concrete design, culvert construction, built in 1992.
- Carousel Lane
- Hickory Hollow Lane
- Street Road

== See also ==
- List of rivers of Pennsylvania
- List of rivers of the United States
- List of Delaware River tributaries
