= Sluice Creek =

River in New Jersey, United States

Coordinates: 39°10′39″N 74°50′44″W

Sluice Creek is a 5.3-mile-long (8.5 km) tributary of Dennis Creek in Cape May County, New Jersey in the United States.

== See also ==
- List of rivers of New Jersey
- Roaring Ditch
