= East Licking Creek =

Watercourse in Pennsylvania, US

Coordinates: 40.52856°N 77.39385°W

East Licking Creek is a 24.0-mile-long (38.6 km) tributary of Tuscarora Creek in central Pennsylvania in the United States.

East Licking Creek joins Tuscarora Creek near Port Royal, 1 mile (1.6 km) upstream from the mouth of Tuscarora Creek at the Juniata River.

== See also ==
- List of rivers of Pennsylvania
