= Mount Misery (Tasmania) =

Mountain in Tasmania

Coordinates: 42°58′26″S 147°00′23″E

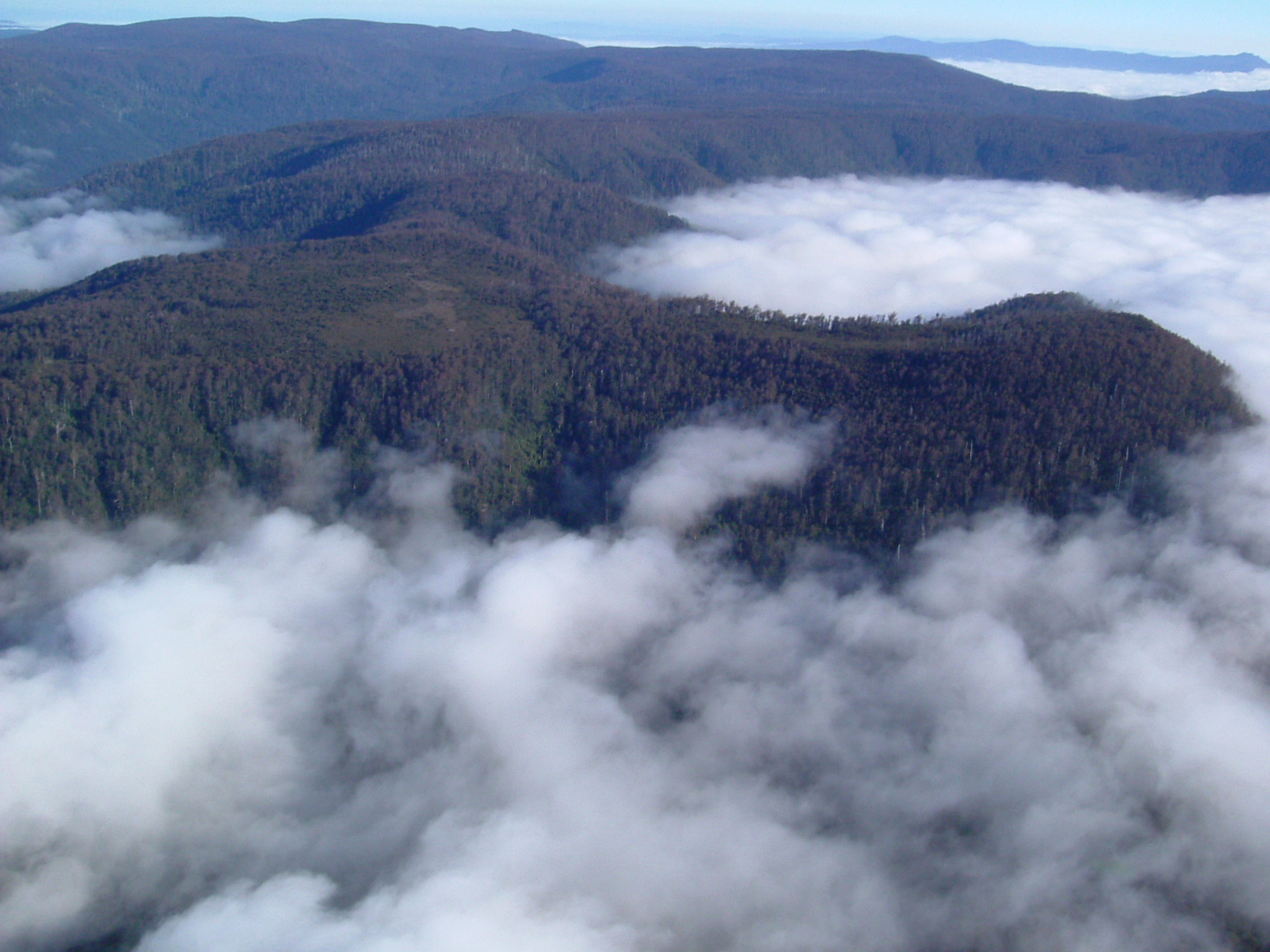

Highest point
- Elevation: 690 m (2,260 ft)

Geography
- Location: Tasmania, Australia

Mount Misery is the dominant feature overlooking Huonville in southern Tasmania. With an elevation of 690 metres (2,260 ft), it is typical of most of the peaks surrounding Huonville; but its location on a bend of the Huon River makes it the dominant feature in many tourist photos.

== Geography ==
The mountain divides the localities of Lucaston to the north east, Ranelagh to the south and Judbury to the west. The Russell Ridge Conservation Area to the north links Mount Misery Habitat Reserve to Mount Wellington Park. The mountain is entirely within the Huon Valley watershed.

== Administration ==
=== Local government ===
Mt Misery is within the Huon Valley Local Government Area.

=== Informal community habitat reserve ===
Many of the land owners on the slopes of Mount Misery and surrounding areas share common nature conservation values. As of 2017 these people own 68 individual titles and loosely apply the name "Mount Misery Habitat Reserve" to the protected area. About half of the titles are formally protected by conservation covenants that protect the natural values in perpetuity. These covenants include the first two conservation covenants issued in Tasmania. These covenants are created under the Private Forest Reserves Program operated by the Tasmanian government. Conservation covenants establish an agreement that sees important conservation values protected for biodiversity in perpetuity.

=== Land usage ===
Most of the land is used for nature-focused residences. Some is used solely for conservation, a few are used as weekend getaways and one group of five titles is an ecotourism resort.

== Vegetation ==
The southern slopes are predominantly tall wet eucalyptus forest with small pockets of rainforest, growing in shallow peaty soils. The northern slopes are dry Eucalyptus tenuiramis on shallow mudstone soils. Most of the land is open grassland.

In general, the canopy is 20–30 metres (66–98 ft) high. Some trees are 50–70 metres (160–230 ft) meters tall.

== Access ==
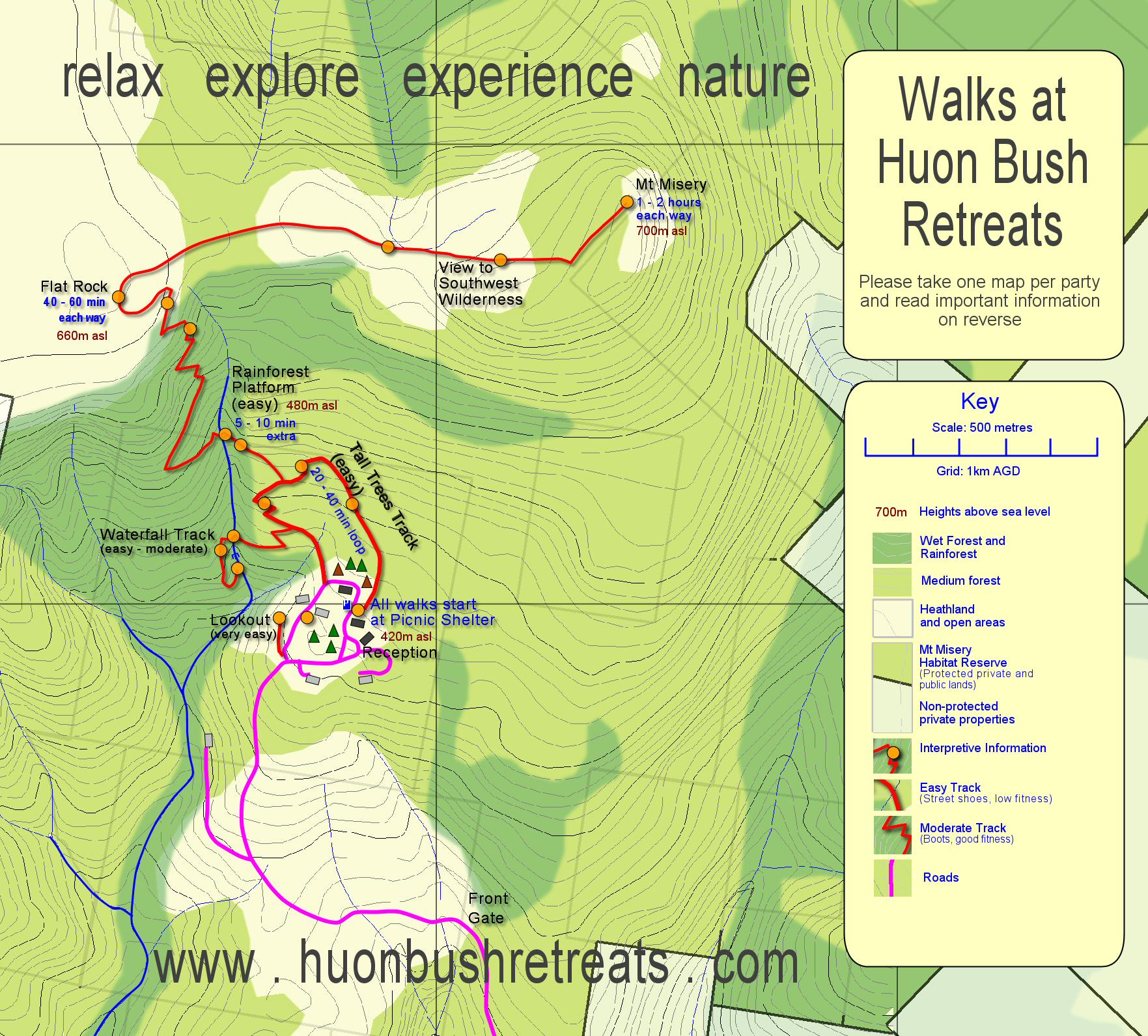
Map of Mount Misery track network

Public access is via a 5-kilometre (3.1 mi) walking track through rainforest and subalpine heathland to the boulders at the summit. Thirty interpretive panels explain the area's Aboriginal history and environmental issues. It takes approximately three hours to walk to the summit. There is no access charge.

The car park and track head are at Huon Bush Retreats, Browns Road, Ranelagh.

== Gallery ==
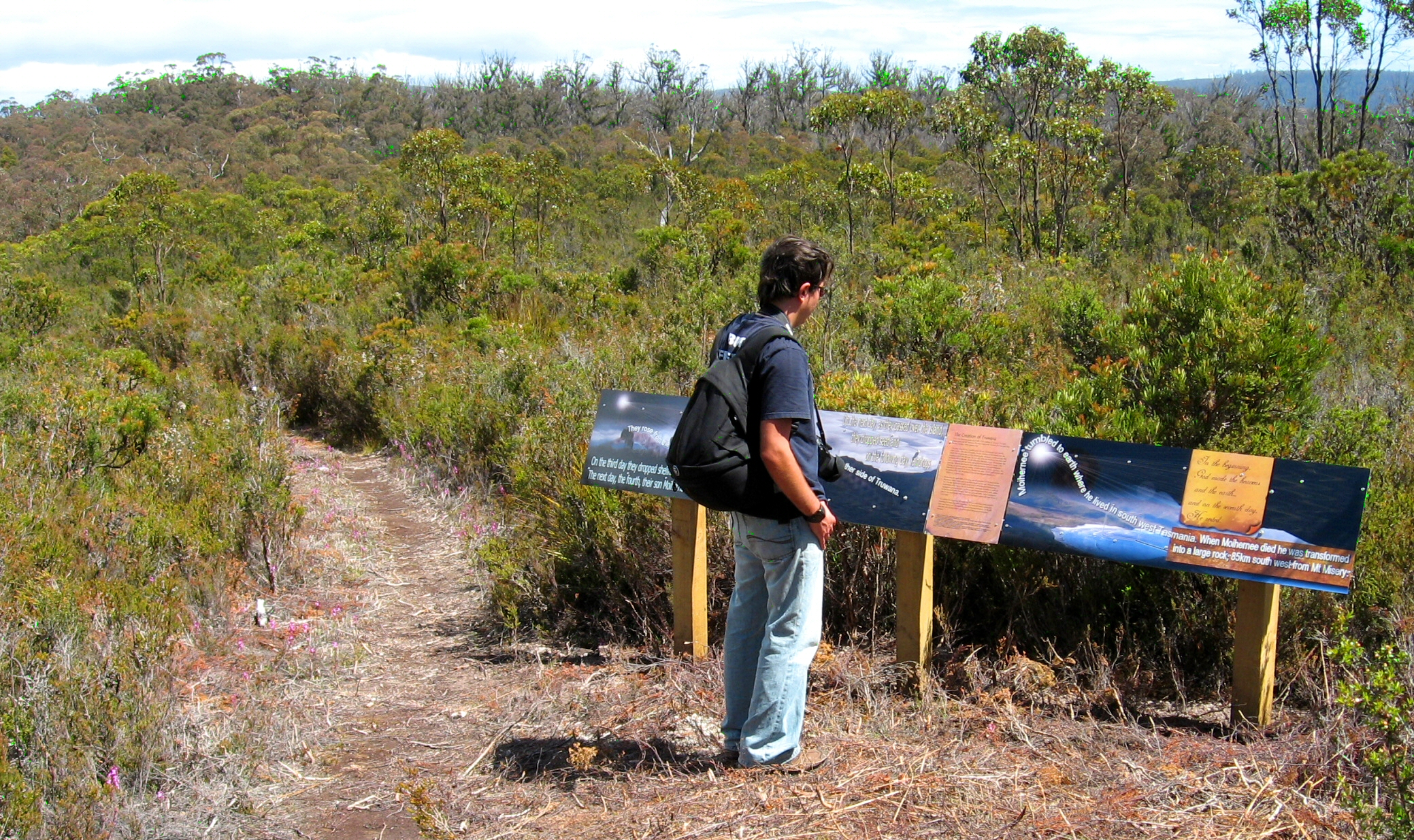
Aboriginal interpretive information on Mount Misery

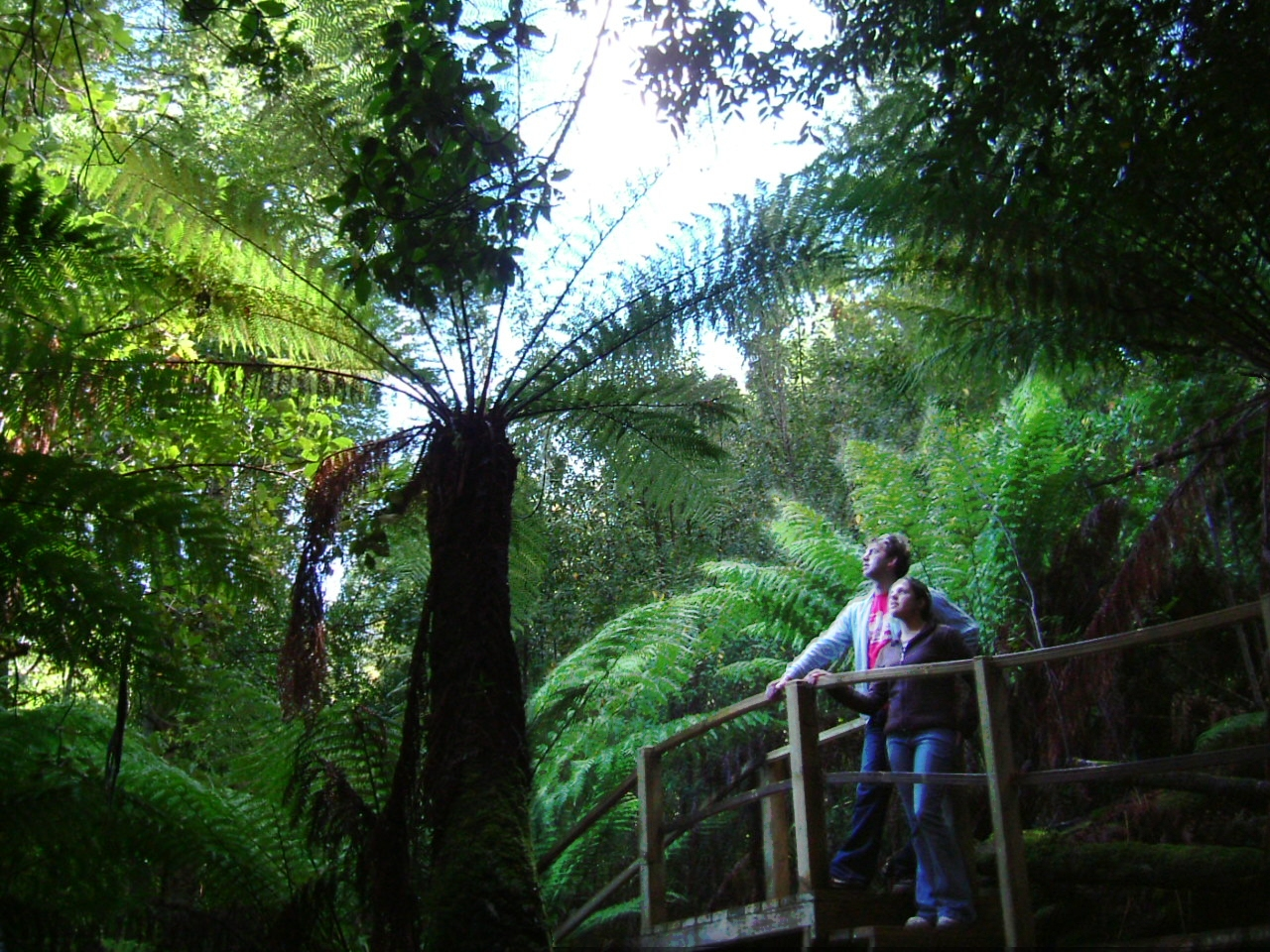
Tree fern bridge, Huon Bush Retreats

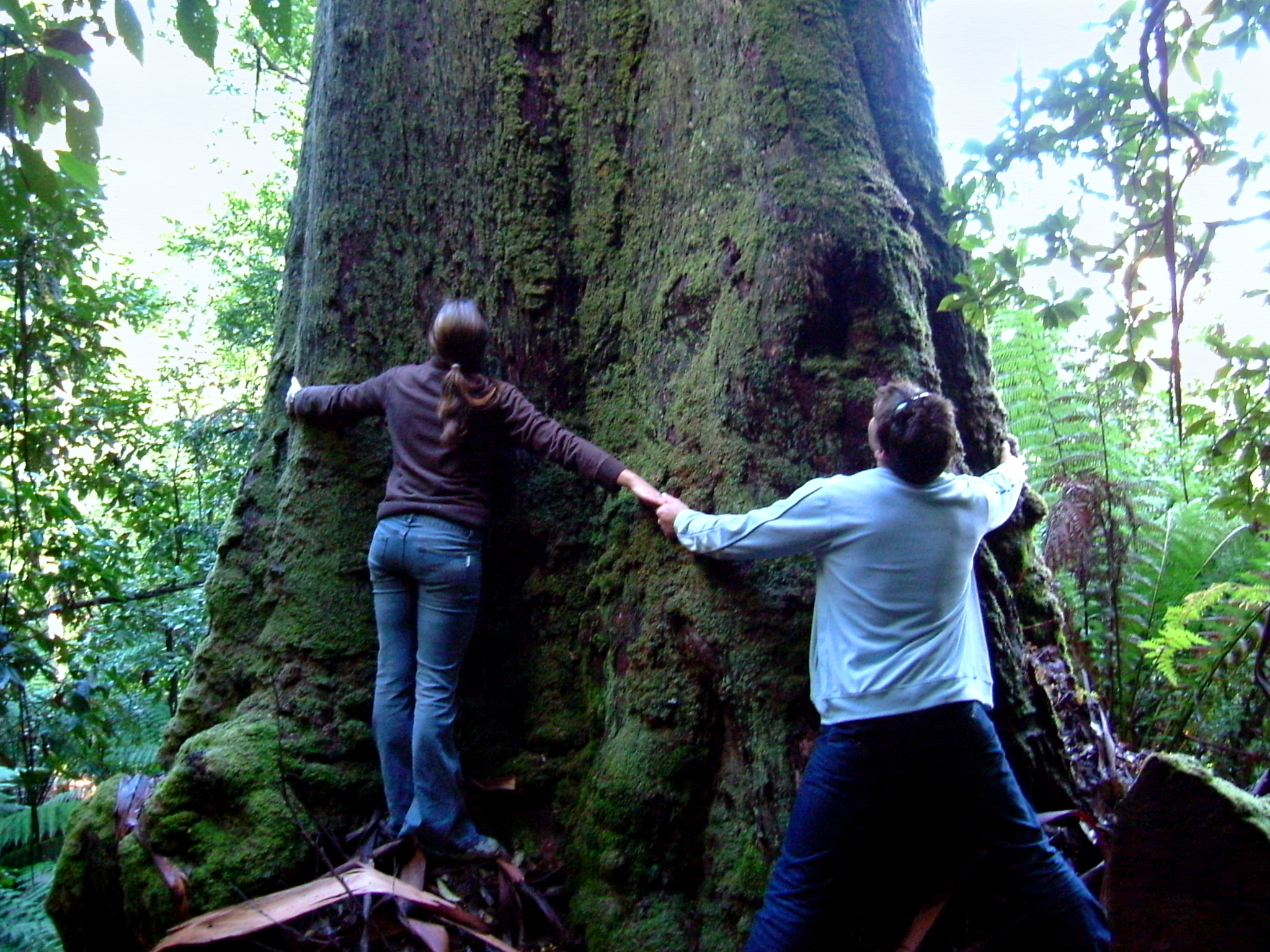
Tree Huggers at Huon Bush Retreats
