= Bennefield Branch (Leipsic River tributary) =

Stream in Delaware, USA

Bennefield Branch Tributary to Leipsic River
- Location of Bennefield Branch mouth Bennefield Branch (Leipsic River tributary) (the United States)

Location
- Country: United States
- State: Delaware
- County: Kent

Physical characteristics
- Source: Finis Branch divide
  - location: about 0.5 miles west of Whitehall Crossroads, Delaware
  - coordinates: 39°16′08″N 075°32′03″W
  - elevation: 20 ft (6.1 m)
- Mouth: Leipsic River
  - location: about 0.5 miles northwest of Leipsic, Delaware
  - coordinates: 39°15′09″N 075°32′03″W
  - elevation: 0 ft (0 m)
- Length: 1.40 mi (2.25 km)
- Basin size: 1.29 square miles (3.3 km^{2})
- Discharge
  - location: Leipsic River
  - average: 1.59 cu ft/s (0.045 m^{3}/s) at mouth with Leipsic River

Basin features
- Progression: south
- River system: Leipsic River
- Tributaries
  - left: unnamed tributaries
  - right: unnamed tributaries
- Bridges: Big Woods Road

Bennefield Branch is a 1.40 mi (2.25 km) long 1st order tributary to the Leipsic River in Kent County, Delaware.

== Course ==
Bennefield Branch rises on the Finis Branch divide about 0.5 miles west of Whitehall Crossroads, Delaware. Bennefield Branch then flows south to meet the Leipsic River about 0.5 miles northwest of Leipsic.

== Watershed ==
Bennefield Branch drains 1.29 square miles (3.3 km^{2}) of area, receives about 45.1 in/year of precipitation, has a topographic wetness index of 684.33 and is about 0% forested.
