= Pinelands Center at Mount Misery =

Methodist retreat center in New Jersey, US

Coordinates: 39.921544°N 74.524887°W

The Pinelands Center at Mount Misery (more commonly known as Mount Misery) is a Methodist retreat center and campground in Browns Mills, New Jersey in the United States.

The center is located on 150 acres near Brendan T. Byrne State Forest, within the New Jersey Pine Barrens on a narrow dirt road known as "Mount Misery Road", near Route 70. Mount Misery Brook flows through this area. it was previously an old CCC camp which later hosted summer camps for the then South Jersey Conference of the Methodist Church.

== Educational aspect ==
Some school districts in New Jersey (including Harrison Township School District and Quinton Township School District) provide field trips for students to visit Mount Misery for about one week. The Cherry Hill School District offers the Cherry Hill Environment Residency Program for students in sixth grade. At the same time, they experience camping and spending the night in their assigned cabins. The program does not involve any religious content.
