= Mount Misery (Washington state) =

Mountain in Washington, United States

- Possossona

Highest point
- Elevation: 6,366 ft (1,940 m)
- Coordinates: 46.1229°N 117.5146°W

Geography
- Location: Garfield County
- Country: United States
- State: Washington

Mount Misery is a peak in Garfield County, Washington. It is the second highest point in Garfield County, Washington at 6,366 feet (1,940 m), 13 ft lower than Diamond Peak, the county's high point.

It was originally named Possossona, meaning "water passing", by the Indigenous peoples.

The peak is included on several lists of unusual Washington state place names.
