= Persimmon Run (West Branch Christina River tributary) =

River tributary in Delaware, USA

Persimmon Run Tributary to West Branch Christina River
- Location within Delaware Location within the United States

Location
- Country: United States
- State: Delaware; Maryland
- County: New Castle (DE); Cecil (MD)

Physical characteristics
- Source: Big Elk Creek divide
  - location: Cecil County Airpark, Cecil County, Maryland
  - coordinates: 39°38′49″N 075°48′00″W
  - elevation: 123 ft (37 m)
- Mouth: West Branch Christina River
  - location: Anvil Park, Delaware
  - coordinates: 39°39′16″N 075°46′33″W
  - elevation: 92 ft (28 m)
- Length: 1.69 mi (2.72 km)
- Basin size: 1.77 square miles (4.6 km^{2})
- Discharge
  - location: West Branch Christina River
  - average: 2.39 cu ft/s (0.068 m^{3}/s) at mouth with West Branch Christina River

Basin features
- Progression: southeast then northeast
- River system: Christina River
- Tributaries
  - left: unnamed tributaries
  - right: unnamed tributaries
- Bridges: Elkton Road, Iron Hill Road, Otts Chapel Road

Persimmon Run is a 1.69-mile-long (2.72 km) 1st order tributary to the West Branch Christina River in New Castle County, Delaware in the United States.

== Course ==
Persimmon Run rises on the Big Elk Creek divide in Cecil County, Maryland and flows southeast then northeast into New Castle County, Delaware meet the West Branch Christina River at Anvil Park, Delaware.

== Watershed ==
Persimmon Run drains 1.77 square miles (4.6 km^{2}) of area, receives about 46.2 in/year of precipitation, has a topographic wetness index of 503.39 and is about 21.7% forested.

== See also ==
- List of Delaware rivers

== Maps ==
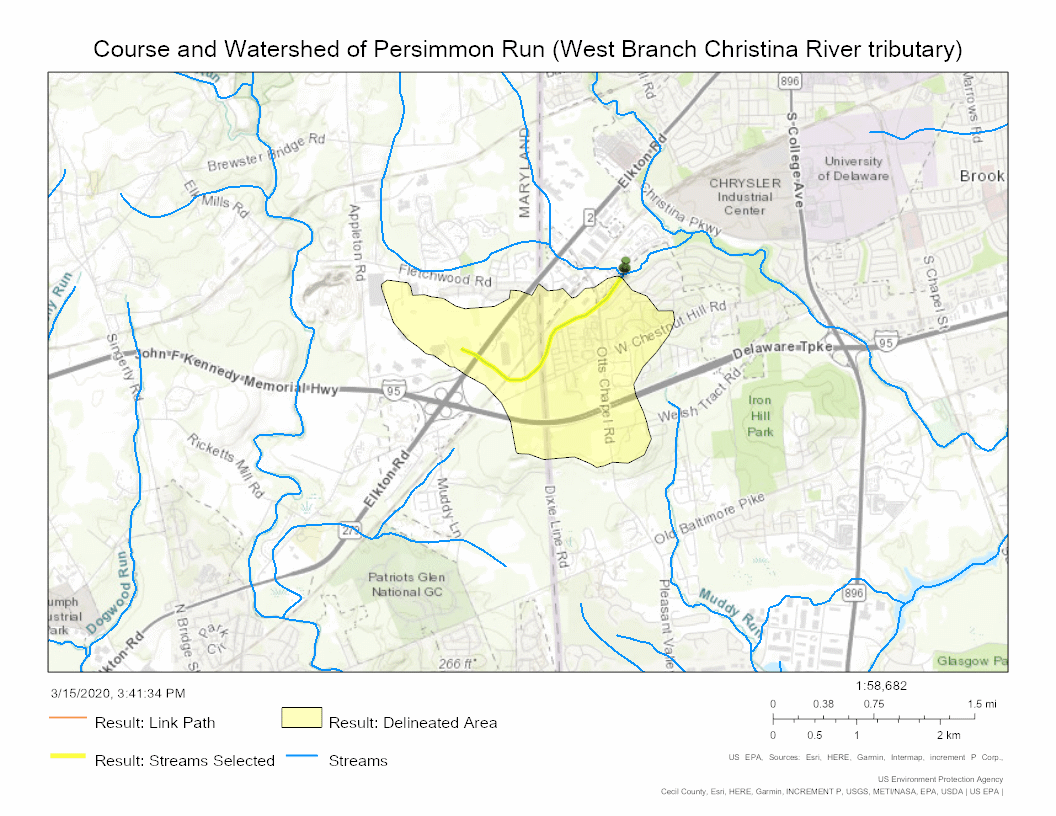
Course and Watershed of Persimmon Run (West Branch Christina River tributary)
