= Ogden Creek =

River in New Jersey, United States

Location
- Country: United States
- State: New Jersey
- County: Cumberland

Physical characteristics
- Mouth: Back Creek
  - location: Cumberland County, New Jersey
  - coordinates: 39°20′50″N 75°15′40″W

Ogden Creek is a tributary of Back Creek in Cumberland County, New Jersey in the United States.

Joseph Ogden owned land at Mill Creek in Fairfield Township. Presumably, the creek was named after him and his family.

== See also ==
- List of rivers of New Jersey
