= Scotts Creek (Delaware River tributary) =

Scotts Creek Sepaessing Kijl
- Scotts Creek

Location
- Country: United States
- State: Pennsylvania
- County: Bucks
- Township: Falls

Physical characteristics
- Source
  - coordinates: 40°9′27″N 74°47′8″W
  - elevation: 10 feet (3.0 m)
- Mouth
  - coordinates: 40°7′41″N 74°46′33″W
  - elevation: 7 metres (23 ft)
- Length: 2.1 miles (3.4 km)

Basin features
- Progression: Scotts Creek → Delaware River → Delaware Bay
- River system: Delaware River
- Landmarks: Pennsbury Manor
- Waterbodies: Van Sciver Lake; Manor Lake
- Bridges: Tyburn Road; Bordentown Road; Pennsbury Memorial Road

Scotts Creek is a tributary of the Delaware River contained wholly within Falls Township, Bucks County, Pennsylvania, and drains at the Delaware's 124.10 river mile.

== History ==
On a map by Lindeström in 1654-1656, Scotts Creek was known as Sepaessing Kijl. Sepaessing was a Native American word meaning 'plum tree' and the term Kijl was a Swedish term meaning river or creek. Because of the excavations of the Warner Company, Scotts Creek retains little of its original characteristics. Most of it is contained within Manor Lake and Van Sciver Lake.

== Statistics ==
Scotts Creek was entered into the Geographic Names Information System of the U.S. Geological Survey on 2 August 1979 as identification number 1187173, U.S. Department of the Interior Geological Survey I.D. is 02926.

== Course ==
The current source of Scotts Creek is Van Sciver Lake, flowing south through Manor Lake on to the Delaware River's 124.10 river mile.

== Municipalities ==
- Falls Township

== Crossings and Bridges ==
- Pennsbury Memorial Road
- Bordentown Road
- Tyburn Road

== See also ==
- List of rivers of Pennsylvania
- List of rivers of the United States
- List of Delaware River tributaries
