= Wyomissing Creek =

Coordinates: 40°19′46″N 75°56′19″W

Wyomissing Creek is a 9.1-mile-long (14.6 km) tributary of the Schuylkill River in Berks County, Pennsylvania, United States. It joins the Schuylkill River at the boundary of West Reading Borough and the City of Reading, Pennsylvania.

The name "Wyomissing" is derived from a Native American language and is purported to mean "place of flats".

== See also ==
- List of rivers of Pennsylvania
