= Leipsic River =

Stream in Delaware, USA

Leipsic River Tributary to Delaware Bay
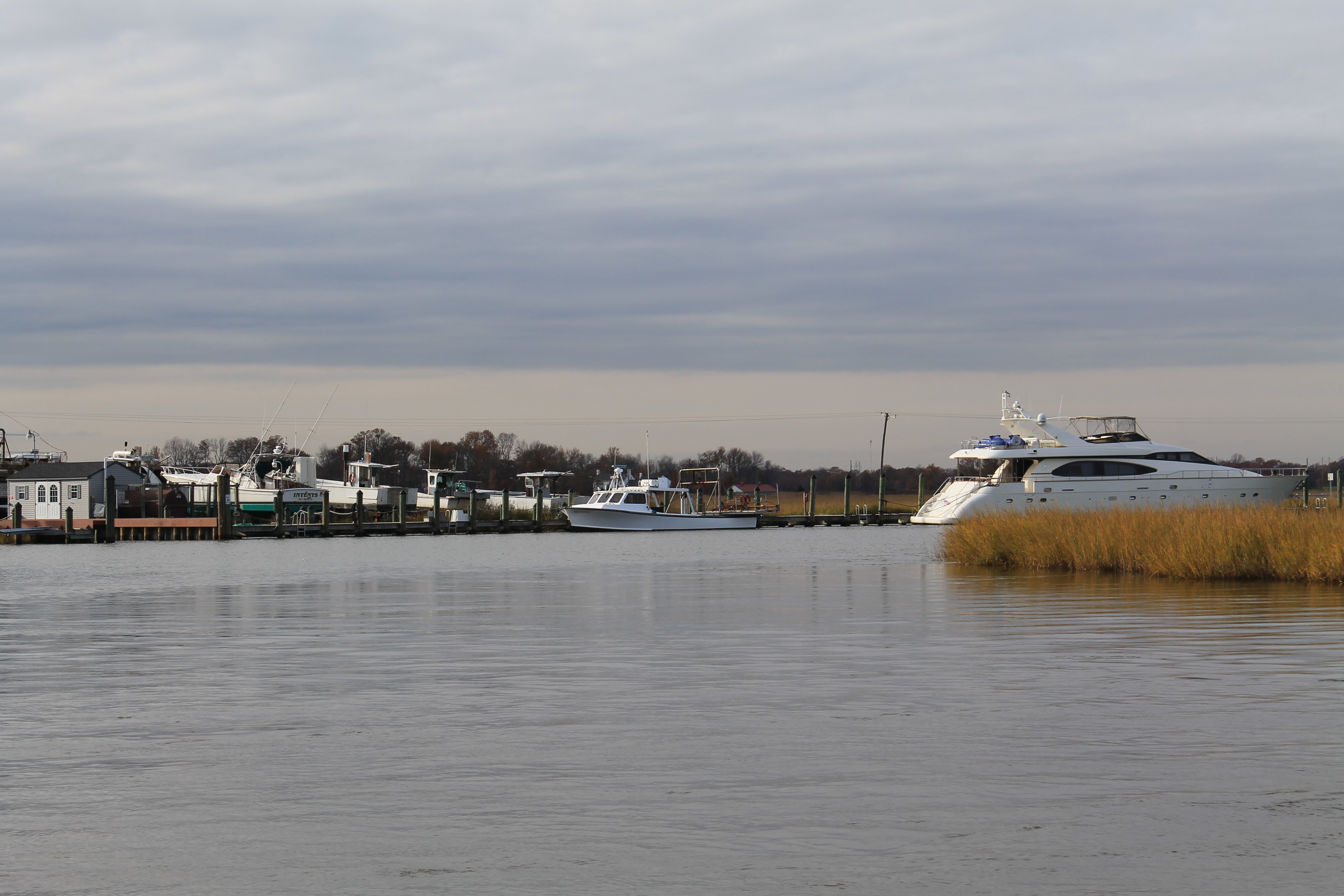
- The Leipsic River at Leipsic

- Location of Leipsic River mouth Leipsic River (the United States)

Location
- Country: United States
- State: Delaware
- County: Kent

Physical characteristics
- Source: confluence of Pinks Branch and Taylor Branch
  - location: about 1 mile north of Seven Hickories, Delaware
  - coordinates: 39°13′55″N 075°38′11″W
  - elevation: 24 ft (7.3 m)
- Mouth: Delaware Bay
  - location: about 0.25 miles south of Goose Point
  - coordinates: 39°14′40″N 075°24′11″W
  - elevation: 0 ft (0 m)
- Length: 16.55 mi (26.63 km)
- Basin size: 53.13 square miles (137.6 km^{2})
- Discharge
  - location: Delaware Bay
  - average: 56.82 cu ft/s (1.609 m^{3}/s) at mouth with Delaware Bay

Basin features
- Progression: east
- River system: Delaware Bay
- Tributaries
  - left: Pinks Branch; Snows Branch; Spruances Branch; Bennefield Branch; Raymond Gut; Duck Creek
  - right: Taylor Branch; Willis Branch; Alston Branch; Dyke Branch; Boat Gut
- Waterbodies: Masseys Millpond; Garrisons Lake

The Leipsic River is a 16.7-mile-long (26.9 km) river in central Delaware in the United States.

It rises in northern Kent County, approximately 8 miles (13 km) northwest of Dover. It flows generally east, past Leipsic and entering Delaware Bay approximately 8 miles (13 km) northeast of Dover. The mouth of the river on Delaware Bay is surrounded by extensive wetlands that are protected as part of Bombay Hook National Wildlife Refuge.

== See also ==
- List of Delaware rivers
