= When the Sky Comes Down It Comes Down on Your Head =

When The Sky Comes Down It Comes Down On Your Head

Studio album by The Zephyrs
- Released: September 17, 2001
- Recorded: 2001
- Genre: Indie rock
- Length: 36:17
- Label: SouthPaw, Play It Again Sam
- Producer: Michael Brennan Jr., The Zephyrs

The Zephyrs chronology
It's OK Not To Say Anything (1999)	When The Sky Comes Down It Comes Down On Your Head (2001)	A Year To The Day (2004)

Professional ratings
Review scores
Source	Rating
Allmusic	4.5/5 stars

When The Sky Comes Down It Comes Down On Your Head is the second full-length album released by Edinburgh based shoegaze band The Zephyrs. It was recorded at The Substation in Cowdenbeath, Scotland. Additional recording took place at Blackwing Studios in London, and at the home of Rachel Goswell (of Mojave 3).

It includes several noteworthy guest musicians. Adele Bethel of Arab Strap performs vocals on "Modern Beats", Rachel Goswell sings on "Setting Sun" and Sean O'Hagan (The High Llamas and Stereolab) contributes string arrangements.

Allmusic called it "...a rare perfect record."

Southpaw Records folded on the very same week that they released this album. Unfortunately for the band, this meant that their publishing deal evaporated, as did their promotional and touring budget. And so, despite the critical acclaim this record received, the band did not have the finances to capitalise on it and each went back to their day jobs.

== Track listing ==
(all songs written by Stuart Nicol except where noted)

1. "The Buildings Aren't Going Anywhere" – 4:24
2. "Modern Beats" (G. Kilgour) – 2:34
3. "Mount Misery" – 4:41
4. "Setting Sun" – 5:31
5. "The Green Tree" – 1:34
6. "Paint Your House" (S. Nicol, D. Nicol) – 4:51
7. "Murder Of A Small Man" (G. Kilgour) – 2:28
8. "Stargazer" – 5:35
9. "Ballad Of The Green Tree" – 4:39

Bonus Tracks (Japan Only):

- "Urges" first appeared on the Stargazer Single/EP (2000)
- "Tork / Dolphin Avenue" first appeared on the album It's Okay Not To Say Anything (2000)

== Band members ==
- Caroline Barber
- Stewart Campbell
- Gordon Kilgour
- Jonathan Kilgour
- David Nicol - bass
- Stuart Nicol - lead vocals, guitar

== Additional musicians ==
- Adele Bethel - vocals on "Modern Beats"
- Barry Burns - flute and piana on "Setting Sun", piana on "Modern Beats" and "Ballad Of The Green Tree"
- Malcom Cochrane - lap steel on "Modern Beats" and "Paint Your House"
- Tom Crosshy - flute on "The Buildings Aren't Going Anywhere", piano and wurlitzer on "Murder Of A Small Man", wurlitzer on "Ballad Of The Green Tree"
- John Cummings - delayed guitar on "Setting Sun"
- Caroline Evans - violin on "Stargazer"
- Rachel Goswell - vocals on "Setting Sun"
- Pete Harvey - cello on "Stargazer"
- Sean O'Hagan - string arrangements on "Mount Misery" and "The Green Tree"
- Graeme Smith - double bass on "Ballad Of The Green Tree"
- Rage Man - starmachine on "Ballad Of The Green Tree"
