= Abbots Creek =

Stream in New Jersey, United States

Coordinates: 39.3396°N 75.2744°W

Abbots Creek is a tributary of Back Creek in Cumberland County, New Jersey in the United States.

== See also ==
- List of rivers of New Jersey
