= Dennis Creek =

River in New Jersey, United States

Coordinates: 39°11′15″N 74°48′15″W

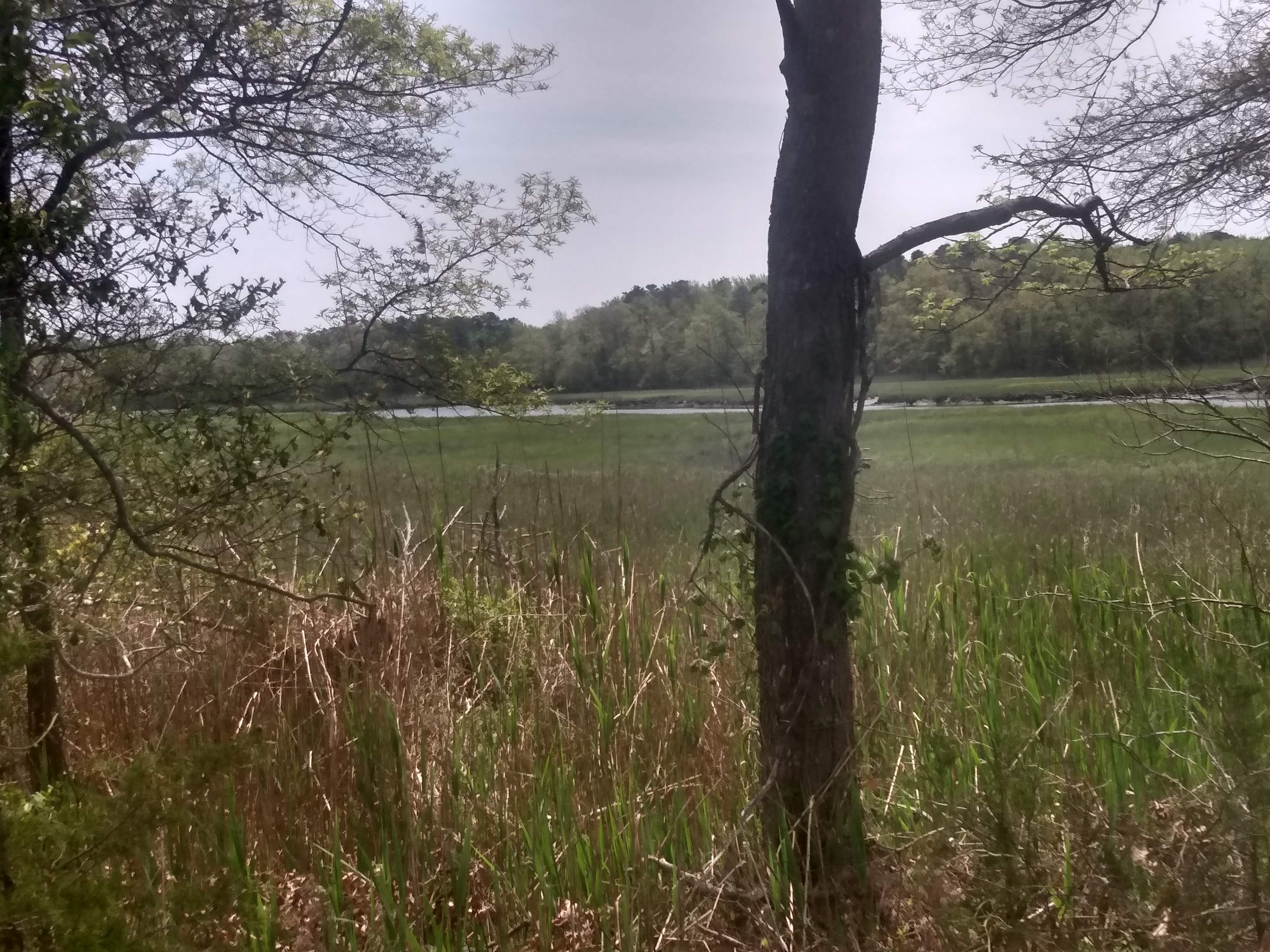
Dennis Creek

Dennis Creek is an 8.8-mile-long (14.2 km) tributary of Delaware Bay in Cape May County, New Jersey in the United States.

It originates in the Great Cedar Swamp to the southeast of Dennisville, New Jersey. Passing between Dennisville and South Dennis, it descends into the tidal marshes and joins Sluice Creek and thereafter forms the boundary between Dennis and Middle Townships. Further below, the channel of Roaring Ditch directs much of the flow of East Creek into Dennis Creek before reaching the bay.

== Tributaries ==
- Roaring Ditch
- Old Robins Branch
- Crow Creek
- Sluice Creek

== See also ==
- List of rivers of New Jersey
