= Back Creek (New Jersey) =

River in New Jersey, United States

Coordinates: 39.384202°N 75.297546°W

Back Creek is an estuary of Delaware Bay in Cumberland County, New Jersey in the United States.

Abbots Creek and Ogden Creek join to form Back Creek, which travels for 3.7 miles (6 km) to Nantuxent Cove of Delaware Bay.

== Tributaries ==
- Abbots Creek
- Ogden Creek

== See also ==
- List of rivers of New Jersey
