= Dyke Branch (Leipsic River tributary) =

Stream in Delaware, USA

Dyke Branch Tributary to Leipsic River

Location
- Country: United States
- State: Delaware
- County: Kent

Physical characteristics
- Source: Fork Branch divide
  - location: about 0.25 miles southeast of Cheswold, Delaware
  - coordinates: 39°12′50″N 075°34′18″W
  - elevation: 40 ft (12 m)
- Mouth: Leipsic River
  - location: Leipsic, Delaware
  - coordinates: 39°14′43″N 075°31′10″W
  - elevation: 0 ft (0 m)
- Length: 4.39 mi (7.07 km)
- Basin size: 6.27 square miles (16.2 km^{2})
- Discharge
  - location: Leipsic River
  - average: 7.67 cu ft/s (0.217 m^{3}/s) at mouth with Leipsic River

Basin features
- Progression: generally northeast
- River system: Leipsic River
- Tributaries
  - left: unnamed tributaries
  - right: unnamed tributaries
- Bridges: US 13, DE 1, Fast Landing Road

Dyke Branch is a 4.39 mi (7.07 km) long 2nd order tributary to the Leipsic River in Kent County, Delaware.

== Course ==
Dyke Branch rises on the Fork Branch divide about 0.25 miles southeast of Cheswold, Delaware. Dyke Branch then flows northeast to meet the Leipsic River at Leipsic.

== Watershed ==
Dyke Branch drains 6.27 square miles (16.2 km^{2}) of area, receives about 45.1 in/year of precipitation, has a topographic wetness index of 670.15 and is about 5% forested.
