= Alston Branch (Leipsic River tributary) =

Stream in Delaware, USA

Alston Branch Tributary to Leipsic River
- Location of Alston Branch mouth Alston Branch (Leipsic River tributary) (the United States)

Location
- Country: United States
- State: Delaware
- County: Kent
- City: Cheswold

Physical characteristics
- Source: Fork Branch divide
  - location: Cheswold, Delaware
  - coordinates: 39°13′15″N 075°35′43″W
  - elevation: 45 ft (14 m)
- Mouth: Leipsic River
  - location: about 1 mile north-northeast of Bishops Corner, Delaware
  - coordinates: 39°14′35″N 075°34′18″W
  - elevation: 0 ft (0 m)
- Length: 2.17 mi (3.49 km)
- Basin size: 1.73 square miles (4.5 km^{2})
- Discharge
  - location: Leipsic River
  - average: 2.13 cu ft/s (0.060 m^{3}/s) at mouth with Leipsic River

Basin features
- Progression: northeast
- River system: Leipsic River
- Tributaries
  - left: unnamed tributaries
  - right: unnamed tributaries
- Bridges: DE 42, US 13, DE 1

Alston Branch is a 2.17 mi (3.49 km) long 1st order tributary to the Leipsic River in Kent County, Delaware. It is only 6 miles away from the state's capital, Dover, Delaware.

== Course ==
Alston Branch rises on the Fork Branch divide in Cheswold, Delaware. Alston Branch then flows northeasterly to meet the Leipsic River about 1-mile north-northeast of Bishops Corner.

== Watershed ==
Alston Branch drains 1.73 square miles (4.5 km^{2}) of area, receives about 45.1 in/year of precipitation, has a topographic wetness index of 586.36 and is about 4% forested.
