= West Branch Christina River =

West Branch Christina River Tributary to Christina River
- Location within Delaware Location within the United States

Location
- Country: United States
- State: Delaware; Maryland
- County: New Castle (DE); Cecil (MD)

Physical characteristics
- Source: Big Elk Creek and Christina River divides
  - location: about 0.1 miles southeast of Appleton, Maryland
  - coordinates: 39°41′44″N 075°48′41″W
  - elevation: 298 ft (91 m)
- Mouth: Christina River
  - location: Newark, Delaware
  - coordinates: 39°39′33″N 075°43′02″W
  - elevation: 79 ft (24 m)
- Length: 4.96 mi (7.98 km)
- Basin size: 6.20 square miles (16.1 km^{2})
- Discharge
  - location: Christina River
  - average: 8.40 cu ft/s (0.238 m^{3}/s) at mouth with Christina River

Basin features
- Progression: south then east
- River system: Christina River
- Tributaries
  - left: unnamed tributaries
  - right: Persimmon Run
- Bridges: Jackson Hall School Road, Barksdale Road, Vieves Way, Winchester Drive, Chestnut Drive, W Creek Village Drive, DE 2, Otts Chapel Road, Sandy Drive

West Branch Christina River is a 4.96-mile-long (7.98 km) second-order tributary to the Christina River in New Castle County, Delaware in the United States.

== Variant name ==
According to the Geographic Names Information System, it has also been known historically as Persimmon Branch.

== Course ==
West Branch Christina River rises on the Big Elk Creek and Christina River divides in Cecil County, Maryland and flows south then east into New Castle County, Delaware meet the Christina River at Newark, Delaware.

== Watershed ==
West Branch Christina River drains 6.20 square miles (16.1 km^{2}) of area, receives about 46.2 in/year of precipitation, has a topographic wetness index of 488.40 and is about 25.1% forested.

== See also ==
- List of Delaware rivers

== Maps ==
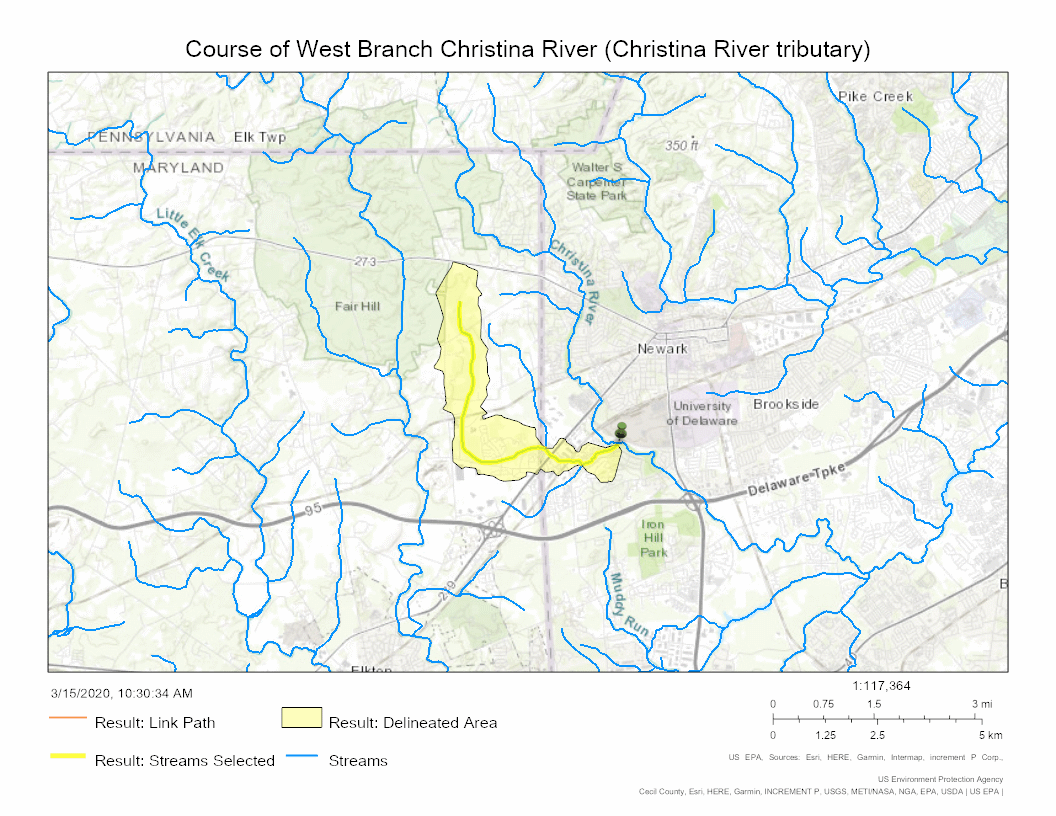
Course of West Branch of Christina River

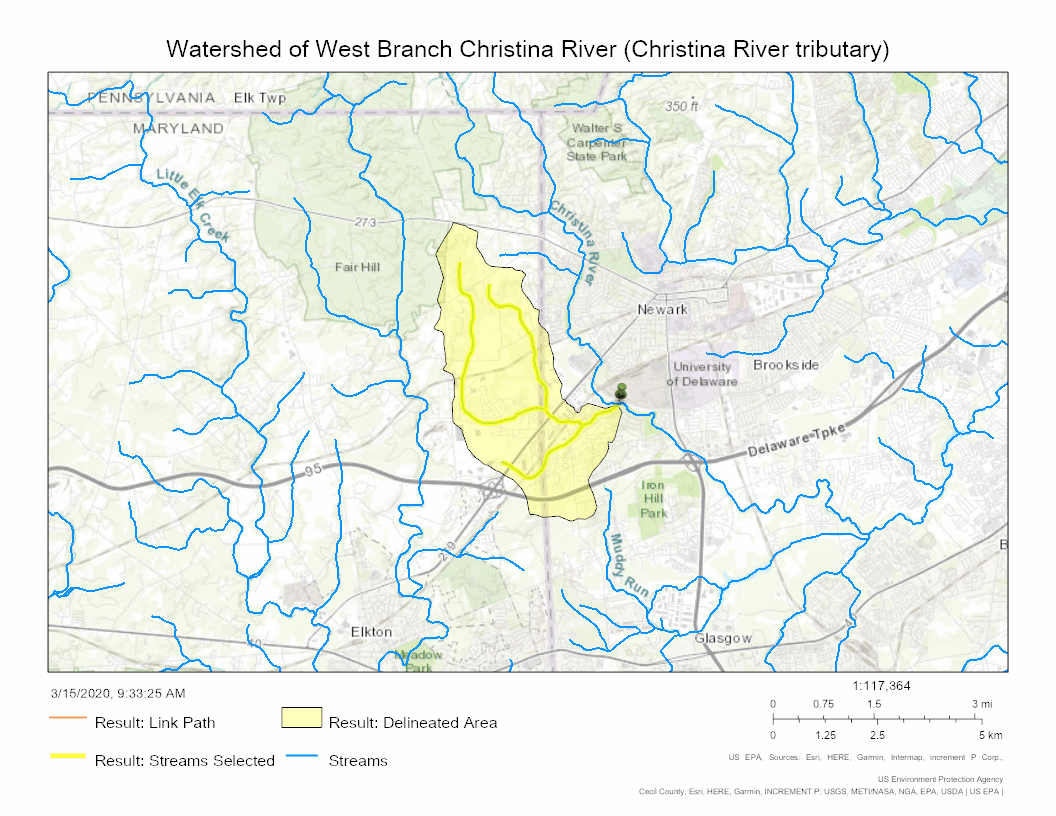
Watershed of the West Branch Christina River
