= Paradise Creek (Pennsylvania) =

Coordinates: 41°04′03″N 75°13′12″W

Paradise Creek is a 9.6-mile-long (15.4 km) tributary of Brodhead Creek in the Poconos in Northeastern Pennsylvania.

Paradise Creek joins Brodhead Creek at the community of Analomink in Monroe County.

== See also ==
- List of rivers of Pennsylvania
