= Yards Creek =

River in Warren County, New Jersey

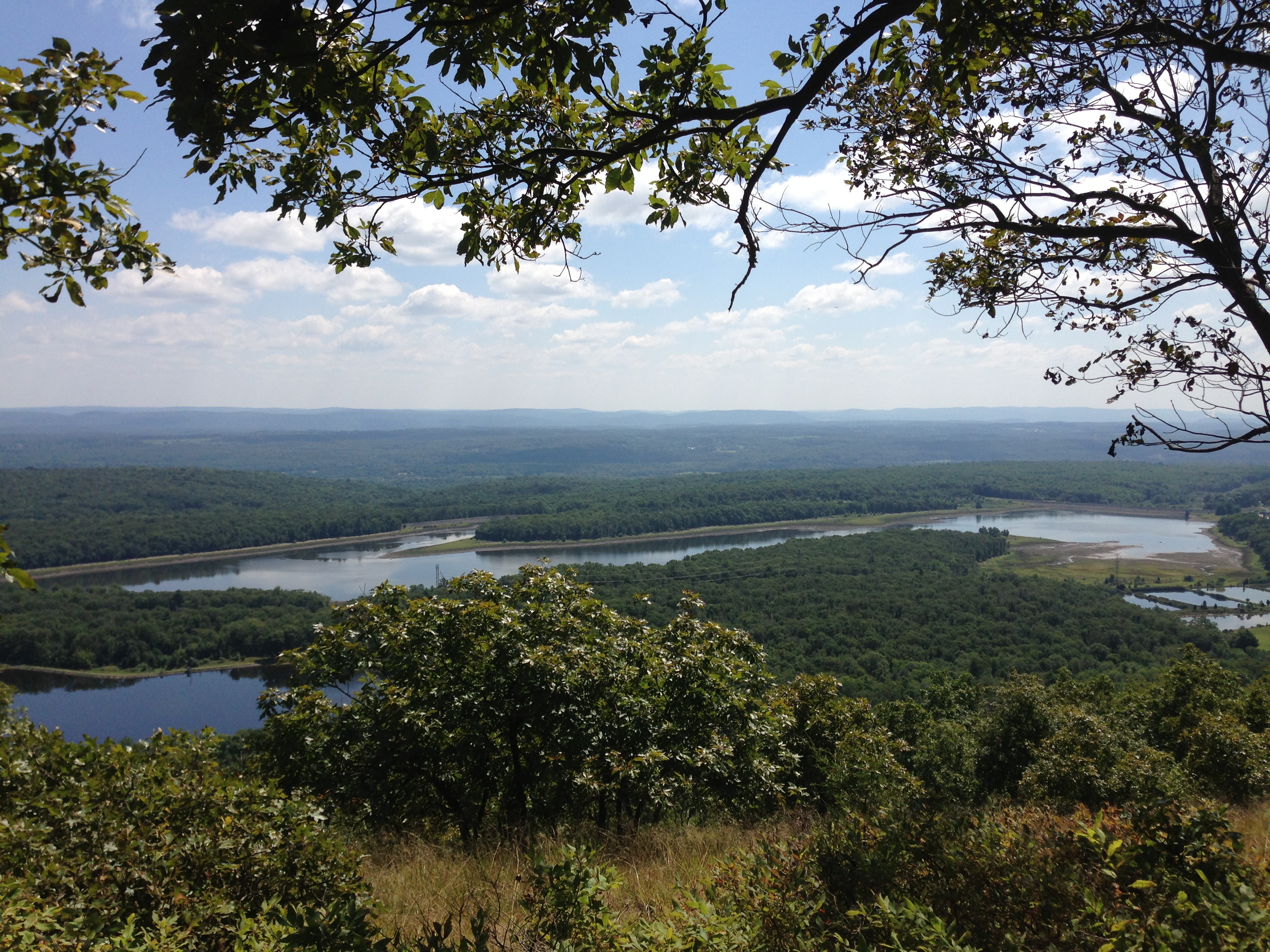
- the Lower Yards Creek Reservoir from the Appalachian Trail

Location
- Country: United States
- State: New Jersey
- County: Warren

Physical characteristics
- Source
  - location: Eastern face of Kittatinny Mountain
- Mouth: Paulins Kill
  - location: Flatbrookville, New Jersey

Basin features
- Progression: Paulins Kill → Delaware River → Delaware Bay → Atlantic Ocean
- GNIS Feature ID 881977

Yards Creek is a tributary of the Paulins Kill located along the eastern face of Kittatinny Mountain in Warren County in northwestern New Jersey in the United States. It rises along Kittatinny Mountain near Catfish Pond in Hardwick Township, flowing into the Yards Creek Reservoir and Lower Yards Creek Reservoir at Yards Creek Generating Station near Blairstown. The creek flows into the Paulins Kill near the hamlet of Hainesburg in Knowlton Township. The Appalachian Trail passes within its watershed and crosses the creek as it traverses the ridgeline of Kittatinny Mountain.
