= Stony Brook (Delaware River tributary) =

River in New Jersey, United States

Coordinates: 40.9391°N 75.1049°W

Stony Brook (formerly Shawpocussing Creek) is a tributary of the Delaware River located along the eastern face of Kittatinny Mountain in Warren County in northwestern New Jersey in the United States. It rises along Kittatinny Mountain, and flows into the Delaware at the base of Mount Tammany, a prominence of Kittatinny Mountain that forms the New Jersey side of the Delaware Water Gap near Columbia in Knowlton Township. The Appalachian Trail passes within its watershed and crosses the creek as it traverses the ridgeline of Kittatinny Mountain.

The original name for the tributary was Shawpocussing Creek, as listed in 19th century sources. However, the Stony Brook had acquired its current name by at least 1917.

== See also ==
- List of rivers of New Jersey
