= Spruances Branch (Leipsic River tributary) =

Stream in Delaware, USA

Spruances Branch Tributary to Leipsic River
- Location of Spruances Branch mouth Spruances Branch (Leipsic River tributary) (the United States)

Location
- Country: United States
- State: Delaware
- County: Kent

Physical characteristics
- Source: Finis Branch divide
  - location: about 1 mile northwest of Whitehall Crossroads, Delaware
  - coordinates: 39°16′47″N 075°32′47″W
  - elevation: 20 ft (6.1 m)
- Mouth: Leipsic River
  - location: about 1 mile northwest of Leipsic, Delaware
  - coordinates: 39°15′05″N 075°32′42″W
  - elevation: 0 ft (0 m)
- Length: 2.73 mi (4.39 km)
- Basin size: 3.23 square miles (8.4 km^{2})
- Discharge
  - location: Leipsic River
  - average: 3.96 cu ft/s (0.112 m^{3}/s) at mouth with Leipsic River

Basin features
- Progression: south
- River system: Leipsic River
- Tributaries
  - left: unnamed tributaries
  - right: unnamed tributaries
- Bridges: Smyrna-Leipsic Road, Big Woods Road

Spruances Branch is a 2.73 mi (4.39 km) long 2nd order tributary to the Leipsic River in Kent County, Delaware.

== Course ==
Spruances Branch rises on the Finis Branch divide about 1 mile northwest of Whitehall Crossroads, Delaware. Spruances Branch then flows south to meet the Leipsic River about 1-mile northwest of Leipsic.

== Watershed ==
Spruances Branch drains 3.23 square miles (8.4 km^{2}) of area, receives about 45.1 in/year of precipitation, has a topographic wetness index of 627.60 and is about 05% forested.
