= Mount Misery Brook =

River in New Jersey, United States

Coordinates: 39.930011°N 74.541035°W

Mount Misery Brook is a tributary of Greenwood Branch in the southern New Jersey Pine Barrens in the United States.

Mount Misery Brook starts in Brendan T. Byrne State Forest, flowing for 4.8 miles (7.7 km) before merging with Pole Bridge Branch to form Greenwood Branch.

== See also ==
- Pinelands Center at Mount Misery, a campground and retreat center near the brook
- List of rivers of New Jersey
