= Shehawken Creek =

Coordinates: 41°56′32″N 75°17′14″W

Shehawken Creek is a stream located in Wayne County, Pennsylvania, near the town of Starlight. It is also known as Chehocton Creek. It is a tributary of the West Branch Delaware River, into which it flows shortly before the West Branch unites with the East Branch to form the Delaware River.
