= Mill Creek (Delaware River tributary) =

- Mill Creek

Location
- Country: United States
- State: Pennsylvania
- County: Bucks
- Township: Middletown, Bristol
- Borough: Bristol

Physical characteristics
- Source
  - coordinates: 40°12′2″N 74°53′24″W
  - elevation: 160 feet (49 m)
- Mouth
  - coordinates: 40°5′33″N 74°51′31″W
  - elevation: 0 feet (0 m)
- Length: 11.04 miles (17.77 km)
- Basin size: 19.80 square miles (51.3 km^{2})

Basin features
- Progression: Mill Creek → Delaware River → Delaware Bay
- River system: Delaware River
- Landmarks: Forsythia Crossing Park; Mill Creek Valley Park; Silver Lake County Park
- Tributaries
  - left: Queen Anne Creek; East Branch Mill Creek
- Waterbodies: Magnolia Lake; Silver Lake
- Bridges: See table below
- Slope: 14.49 feet per mile (2.744 m/km)

Mill Creek (also known as Otter Creek) is a 11.04 miles (17.77 km) long tributary of the Delaware River and is one of six streams in Bucks County, Pennsylvania by the same name. Mill Creek rises just east of Core Creek Park in Middletown Township and reaches its confluence at the Delaware River's 118.87 river mile in Bristol Borough.

== History ==
In 1885, the "Atlas of Properties Near the Philadelphia and Trenton Railroad" by G.M. Hopkins, give Mill Creek shows the stream from its source to the confluence with Queen Anne Creek (Mill Creek) as Mill Creek, but, below that as Otter Creek. Some modern maps show Mill Creek all the way to the Delaware except that the estuary itself is labeled as Otter Creek.

The east branch of Mill Creek is also known locally as Black Ditch Creek.

Lake Magnolia was originally a soil borrow site during the Pennsylvania Turnpike construction decades ago.

Silver Lake appears to have been created around 1701 after a dam was built in 1687 to power a mill in Bristol. Due to the rust-colored water, baths were built beginning in 1773 and completed in 1801 as it was thought to cure many diseases. Silver Lake has been dredged a number of times to remove silt.

In March 2023, approximately 8,000 gallons of "latex finishing material" leaked into Otter Creek. The material leaked from a pipe at a Trinseo plant. Residents of Philadelphia were advised to drink bottled water on March 26, as there was a chance tap water may have been impacted.

== Statistics ==
The watershed of Mill Creek is 19.80 square miles (51.3 km^{2}), passing through residential, commercial, and industrial areas, much of the path of the creek lies in Levittown, Pennsylvania. The Geographic Name Information System I.D. is 1181137, U.S. Department of the Interior Geological Survey I.D. is 02916.

== Course ==
Rising just east of the Core Creek Park at an elevation of 160 feet (49 m), the west branch of Mill Creek flows generally south-southeast to its 9.69 river mile just east of Langhorne Manor where it meets an unnamed tributary on the right bank. Then it turns to the south for a distance to the Mill Creek Valley Park. Making an S-bend, at the 5.14 river mile, it then joins with Queen Anne Creek then flows south until its adjacent to Interstate 276 Pennsylvania Turnpike where it makes a hard left at the 3.07 river mile to flow east into the Black Ditch Park where meets with the east branch of Mill Creek. At the 2.00 river mile, Mill Creek flows into Silver Lake which discharges Mill Creek at the 1.33 river mile, thence meet its confluence with the Delaware River at an elevation of 0 feet (0 m). The average slope of Mill Creek including the west branch is 14.49 feet per mile (2.744 m/km).

The east branch rises with two branches near the Falls Township Lake. After a short distance to the southwest, it meets a branch that connects with the Pennsylvania Canal (Delaware Division), then continues variously south and southeast to its confluence with the west branch in the Black Ditch Park.

== Named Tributaries ==
- Queen Anne Creek
- East Branch Mill Creek

== Municipalities ==
- Mill Creek, main branch
  - Bristol Borough
  - Bristol Township
- Mill Creek, western branch
  - Bristol Township
  - Middletown Township
- Mill Creek, eastern branch
  - Bristol Township
  - Falls Township

== Public Parks ==
- Main Branch
  - Silver Lake County Park
  - Black Ditch Park
- western branch
  - Mill Creek County Park

== Crossings ==
Crossing	NBI Number	Length	Lanes	Spans	Material/Design	Built	Reconstructed	Latitude	Longitude
Eastern Branch Mill Creek
Levittown Parkway	-	-	4	-	-	-	-	40°9'39"N	74°49'57"W
Crabtree Drive	-	-	-	-	-	-	-	40°9'38"N	74°50'1"W
Holly Pass	-	-	-	-	-	-	-	40°9'24"N	74°50'14"W
Oak Tree Pass	-	-	-	-	-	-	-	4°9'4"N	74°50'30"W
Overbrook Lane	-	-	-	-	-	-	-	40°8'50"N	74°50'32"W
Mill Creek Parkway	-	-	-	-	-	-	-	40°8'44"N	74°50'30"W
Edgely Road	-	-	-	-	-	-	-	40°8'19"N	74°50'32"W
Green Lane	-	-	-	-	-	-	-	40°7'53"N	74°51'25"W
Western Branch Mill Creek
Croasdale Dr	-	-	-	-	-	-	-	40°11'59"N	74°53'23"W
Big Oak Road	-	-	-	-	-	-	-	40°11'49"N	74°53'18"W
Woodbourne Road	-	-	-	-	-	-	-	40°11'34"N	74°53'29"W
U.S. Route 1	-	-	-	-	-	-	-	40°11'20"N	74°53'42"W
Pennsylvania Route 213 (Maple Avenue)	6946	7 metres (23 ft)	2	1	Concrete culvert	1972	-	40°10'36"N	74°54'0"W
U.S. Route 1 (business)(Lincoln Highway)	7022	6 metres (20 ft)	2	1	Concrete culvert	1969	-	40°9'54"N	74°54'6"W
Interstate 95 (Delaware Expressway) northbound	6861	19 metres (62 ft)	3	1	Prestressed concrete box beam or girder - single or spread	1972	-	40°9'43.2"N	74°54'2.92"W
Interstate 95 (Delaware Expressway) southbound	6860	19 metres (62 ft)	3	1	Prestressed concrete box beam or girder - single or spread	1972	-	40°9'42.7"N	74°54'2.14"W
Pennsylvania Route 413 (New Rodgers Road)	7019	9 metres (30 ft)	2	1	Concrete arch-deck	1949	2012	40°9'40.8"N	74°53'48.62"W
Trenton Road	7179	15 metres (49 ft)	2	1	Prestressed concrete box beam or girder - multiple	1957	2010	40°9'27.9"N	74°53'29.3"W
Forsythia Crossing	48823	13 metres (43 ft)	2	2	Steel multi-beam or girder	1960	-	40°9'14.84"N	74°53'9.2"W
Frosty Hollow Road	7490	13 metres (43 ft)	2	1	Box beam or girders - multiple	1957	-	40°8'52.8"N	74°52'49.4"W
New Falls Road	7162	14.9 metres (49 ft)	2	2	Concrete slab, concrete cast-in-place deck	1970	-	40°8'24"N	74°52'34"W
Bristol Oxford Valley Road	7226	25 metres (82 ft)	2	1	Concrete tee beam, concrete cast-in-place deck	1954	-	40°7'36"N	74°51'56"W
Main Branch Mill Creek
Interstate 276 Pennsylvania Turnpike	7678	37.2 metres (122 ft)	4	3	Steel stringer/multi-beam or girder, concrete cast-in-place deck	1954	-	40°7'30"N	74°51'36"W
Lakeland Avenue	7500	23.8 metres (78 ft)	2	2	Prestressed concrete box beam or girders	1954	-	40°7'9"N	74°51'34"W
Bath Road	7225	17.4 metres (57 ft)	2	1	Steel stringer/multi-beam or girder, concrete cast-in-place deck	1958	-	40°6'11"N	74°51'50"W
U.S. Route 13 (Bristol Pike)	6770	31 metres (102 ft)	4	3	Steel stringer/multi-beam or girder, concrete cast-in-place deck	1955	-	40°9'30"N	74°48'48"W
Otter Street	-	-	-	-	-	-	-	40°5'49"N	74°52'11"W
Old Route 13	-	-	-	-	-	-	-	40°5'48"N	74°52'11"W
Maple Beach Road	-	-	-	-	-	-	-	40°5'37"N	74°51'45"W

== See also ==
- List of rivers of Pennsylvania
- List of rivers of the United States
- List of Delaware River tributaries
