= Greenwood Branch =

River in the United States of America

Coordinates: 39°57′25″N 74°37′35″W

The Greenwood Branch is a 9.3-mile-long (15.0 km) tributary of the North Branch Rancocas Creek in the southern New Jersey Pine Barrens in the United States.

Greenwood Branch, born of the confluence of Mount Misery Brook and Pole Bridge Branch, ends at the North Branch Rancocas Creek just below New Lisbon.

== Tributaries ==
- Mount Misery Brook
- Pole Bridge Branch
- Bisphams Mill Creek

== See also ==
- List of rivers of New Jersey
