= Pole Bridge Branch =

Coordinates: 39°56′57″N 74°30′49″W

The Pole Bridge Branch is a 12.1-mile-long (19.5 km) tributary of the Greenwood Branch in the southern New Jersey Pine Barrens, United States. This tributary originates from the North Branch Rancocas Creek which flows into the Delaware river in New Jersey, United States.

== See also ==
- List of rivers of New Jersey
