= Primehook Creek (Broadkill River tributary) =

Stream in Delaware, USA

Primehook Creek Tributary to Broadkill River
- Location of Primehook Creek mouth Primehook Creek (Broadkill River tributary) (the United States)

Location
- Country: United States
- State: Delaware
- County: Sussex

Physical characteristics
- Source: confluence of North Prong, Sowbridge Branch, and Ingram Branch
  - location: Waples Pond
  - coordinates: 38°49′32″N 075°18′22″W
  - elevation: 4 ft (1.2 m)
- Mouth: Broadkill River
  - location: Broadkill Beach, Delaware
  - coordinates: 38°50′04″N 075°13′20″W
  - elevation: 0 ft (0 m)
- Length: 7.85 mi (12.63 km)
- Basin size: 28.16 square miles (72.9 km^{2})
- Discharge
  - location: Broadkill River
  - average: 33.99 cu ft/s (0.962 m^{3}/s) at mouth with Broadkill River

Basin features
- Progression: Broadkill River → Delaware Bay → Atlantic Ocean
- River system: Broadkill River
- Tributaries
  - left: unnamed tributaries
  - right: Deep Branch
- Bridges: none

Primehook Creek is a 7.85 mi (12.63 km) long 2nd order tributary to the Broadkill River in Sussex County, Delaware.

== Variant names ==
According to the Geographic Names Information System, it has also been known historically as:

- Prime Hook Creek
- Prune Hook Creek

== Course ==
Primehook Creek forms at the confluence of North Prong, Sowbridge Branch, and Ingram Branch in Waples Pond. Primehook Creek then flows generally east to meet the Broadkill River at Broadkill Beach.

== Watershed ==
Primehook Creek drains 28.16 square miles (72.9 km^{2}) of area, receives about 45.3 in/year of precipitation, has a topographic wetness index of 719.80 and is about 13% forested. Primehook Creek is covered by a large Red Maple-Alder Swamp that maybe now mostly dead from saltwater intrusion.
