= Roaring Ditch =

River in New Jersey, United States

Coordinates: 39°11′31″N 74°53′24″W

Roaring Ditch is a tidal waterway approximately 1.6 mi (2.6 km) in length connecting East Creek and Dennis Creek in Cape May County, New Jersey in the United States.

== See also ==
- List of rivers of New Jersey
