= East Creek (New Jersey) =

River in New Jersey, United States

Coordinates: 40.547200°N 74.652100°W

East Creek is a 4.8-mile-long (7.7 km) tributary of Delaware Bay in Cape May County, New Jersey in the United States.

It is probably named in contradistinction to West Creek, which lies to the west, although the name of that creek is ultimately derived from the Lenape "westeconk". It rises in Belleplain State Forest, and is dammed to form East Creek Pond, which covers its convergence with Savages Run. It flows through the tidal marshes on the east side of the Stipson Island peninsula, where it is joined by Willis Run. Just below, most of its flow is diverted by Roaring Ditch into Dennis Creek, leaving only a small channel to reach the bay.

== Tributaries ==
- Roaring Ditch
- Willis Run
- Savages Run

== See also ==
- List of rivers of New Jersey
