= Leithsville Formation =

Geologic formation in New Jersey, United States

- Stratigraphic range: Cambrian
- Type: Formation
- Underlies: Allentown Dolomite
- Overlies: Hardyston Quartzite

Location
- Region: New Jersey
- Country: United States

The Leithsville Formation is a geologic formation in New Jersey. It preserves fossils dating back to the Cambrian period.

== See also ==
- List of fossiliferous stratigraphic units in New Jersey
- Paleontology in New Jersey
