= Pennsylvania Route 232 =

State highway in Pennsylvania, US

Pennsylvania Route 232

Route information
- Maintained by PennDOT
- Length: 25.157 mi (40.486 km)
- Existed: 1928–present

Major junctions
- South end: US 1 / US 13 in Philadelphia
- PA 73 in Philadelphia; PA 63 in Huntingdon Valley; PA 132 in Southampton; PA 332 in Richboro; PA 413 in Wrightstown Township
- North end: PA 32 in New Hope

Location
- Country: United States
- State: Pennsylvania
- Counties: Philadelphia, Montgomery, Bucks

Highway system
- Pennsylvania State Route System; Interstate; US; State; Scenic; Legislative
← PA 231	→ PA 233

Pennsylvania Route 232 (PA 232) is a 25.2-mile-long (40.6 km) state highway located in southeastern Pennsylvania. The southern terminus of the route is at U.S. Route 1 (US 1)/US 13 at the Oxford Circle in Philadelphia. The northern terminus is at PA 32 in the borough of New Hope, Bucks County, on the banks of the Delaware River. The route passes through the urban areas of Northeast Philadelphia as Oxford Avenue, serving the Lawncrest, Burholme, and Fox Chase neighborhoods. Upon entering Montgomery County, PA 232 becomes Huntingdon Pike and through suburban areas, serving the communities of Rockledge, Huntingdon Valley, and Bryn Athyn. The route passes through more suburban development in Bucks County as Second Street Pike, running through Southampton and Richboro. In Wrightstown Township, PA 232 enters rural areas and becomes Windy Bush Road as it heads north to New Hope.

South of Penns Park, the road was originally known as the Fox Chase and Huntingdon Valley Turnpike or the Second Street Turnpike, a turnpike that connected farms in Bucks County to Philadelphia. In 1928, PA 232 was designated between PA 532 in Northeast Philadelphia and PA 32 in New Hope, while PA 163 was designated onto current PA 232 between PA 73 in Philadelphia and PA 63 in Bethayres. PA 232 was rerouted south along PA 163 in 1937 and extended to US 1/US 13 at the Oxford Circle by 1960.

== Route description ==
=== Philadelphia County ===
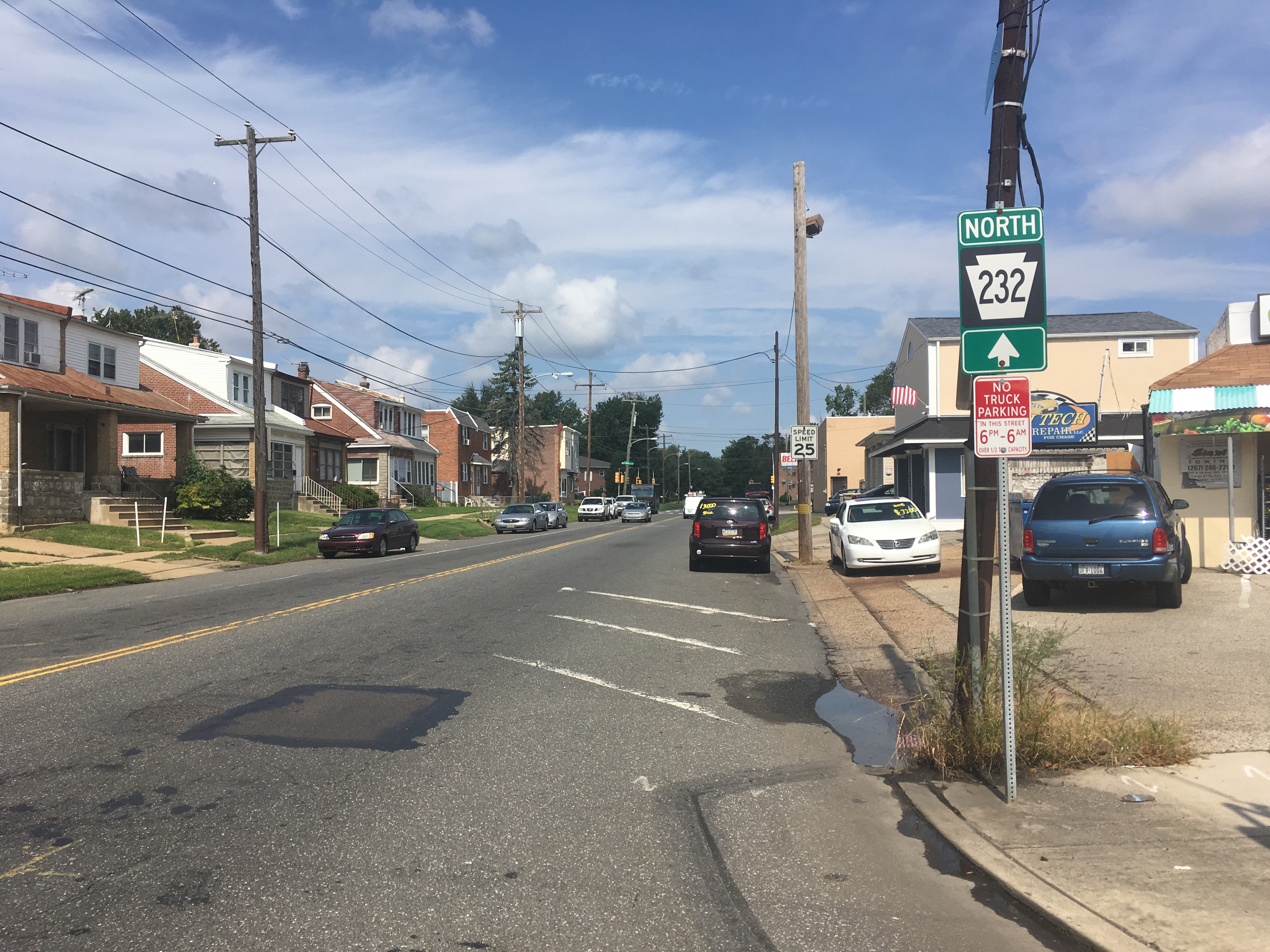
PA 232 (Oxford Avenue) northbound past Verree Road in Northeast Philadelphia

PA 232 begins along Oxford Avenue at the Oxford Circle, where it intersects with US 1/US 13 (Roosevelt Boulevard), Cheltenham Avenue, and Castor Avenue, in the Northeast Philadelphia section of the city of Philadelphia in Philadelphia County. Oxford Avenue continues south from the Oxford Circle as a city street through urban areas to an intersection with Frankford Avenue, Arrott Street, and Margaret Street at the Arrott Transportation Center along SEPTA's Market–Frankford Line in the Frankford neighborhood. The Oxford Circle is a modified traffic circle that has direct access to the local lanes of the Roosevelt Boulevard, with the express lanes passing under it. From here, the route continues north on Oxford Avenue, a two-lane undivided road. The road passes through urban areas of businesses before turning northwest into areas of rowhouses. The route runs to the west of Har Nebo Cemetery and turns north through locations of homes and businesses, passing to the east of Naval Support Activity Philadelphia.

After passing the naval facility, Oxford Avenue continues northeast at the intersection with Robbins Street/Martins Mill Road and crosses Levick Street. PA 232 runs north through the residential Lawncrest neighborhood and reaches the Five Points intersection with PA 73 (Cottman Avenue) and Rising Sun Avenue in the Burholme neighborhood. From this junction, the route passes a mix of urban residential and commercial establishments as it comes to a bridge over CSX's Trenton Subdivision railroad line at the Bleigh Avenue intersection and reaches a junction with Verree Road. PA 232 continues into the Fox Chase neighborhood, crossing SEPTA's Fox Chase Line at-grade south of its terminus at the Fox Chase station. The route heads into the downtown area of Fox Chase and passes east of SEPTA's Fox Chase Bus Loop before coming to the Rhawn Street intersection, where the road makes a turn to the northwest.

=== Montgomery County ===
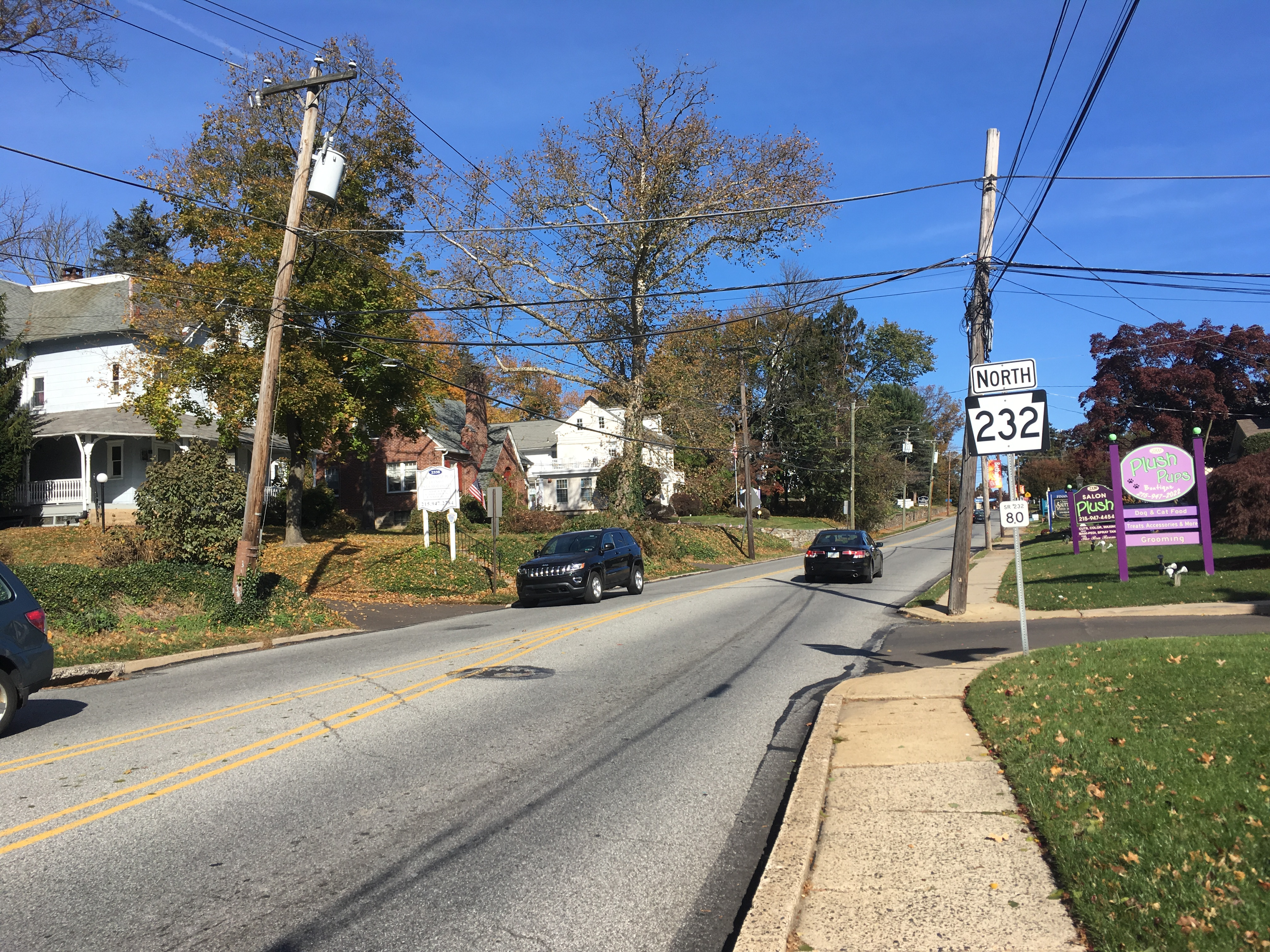
PA 232 northbound past PA 63 in Bethayres

Leaving Philadelphia at the Filmore Avenue intersection, PA 232 crosses into the borough of Rockledge in Montgomery County. Here the name of the road changes to Huntingdon Pike as it passes suburban homes and businesses. Upon intersecting Fox Chase Road/Shady Lane, the route turns north and widens to four lanes as it heads into Abington Township. Here, the road passes between the Hollywood neighborhood to the west and a shopping center to the east, reaching a junction with Cedar Road. Farther north, PA 232 runs through wooded residential areas as it enters the Huntingdon Valley area and comes to the Susquehanna Road intersection. The road turns northeast at this point and passes near more homes prior to running to the southeast of Holy Redeemer Hospital, at which point it widens into a four-lane divided highway with some intersections controlled by jughandles. PA 232 crosses over the Pennypack Creek and the Pennypack Trail before it enters Lower Moreland Township at the Moreland Road intersection. Here, the route passes over SEPTA's West Trenton Line west of the Bethayres station and crosses PA 63 (Welsh Road/Philmont Avenue) in the community of Bethayres.

Past the PA 63 junction, PA 232 narrows into a two-lane undivided road and is lined with homes before passing a few businesses, heading through the center of Huntingdon Valley and reaching an intersection with Red Lion Road. The road continues into the borough of Bryn Athyn and runs through wooded residential areas west of the Academy of the New Church Secondary Schools before passing between the Bryn Athyn Cathedral, the Glencairn Museum, and the historic home Cairnwood to the west and Bryn Athyn College to the east. The route continues into less dense wooded residential development as it briefly forms the border between Lower Moreland Township to the west and Bryn Athyn to the east before fully entering Lower Moreland Township again. The road turns northeast as it passes near a few businesses at the Byberry Road intersection, where Spur Road serves as a connector road in the southwest quadrant of the intersection, before heading through wooded residential subdivisions.

=== Bucks County ===
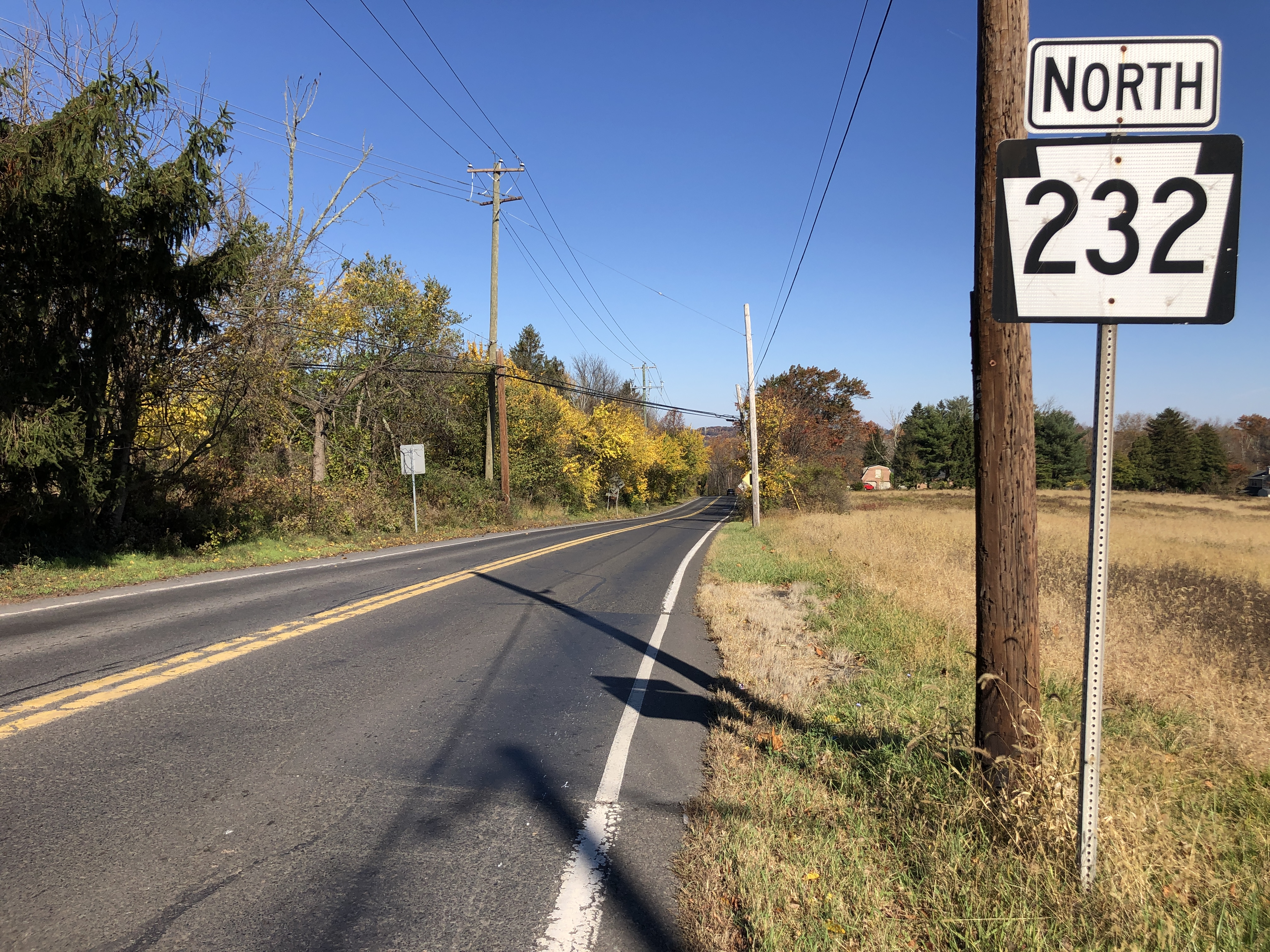
PA 232 northbound past Sackettsford Road in Northampton Township

PA 232 crosses County Line Road and enters Upper Southampton Township in Bucks County. Here, the road is named Second Street Pike and it heads north into business areas as a three-lane road with a center left-turn lane, passing over Norfolk Southern's Morrisville Line before coming to a bridge over the Pennsylvania Turnpike (Interstate 276). The route crosses the Newtown Rail Trail west of the former Southampton station before intersecting PA 132 (Street Road) in the community of Southampton.

After this intersection, the road narrows back to two lanes and turns northeast into residential areas, reaching a junction with Maple Avenue. PA 232 makes a curve to the north as it crosses Bristol Road into Northampton Township. The route turns northeast again and continues past more housing developments with a few businesses. At Richboro, the road crosses Ironworks Creek and passes shopping centers and businesses as Bustleton Pike merges into Second Street Pike and PA 232 continues due north. The route widens to four lanes and passes more commercial development as it crosses PA 332 (Almshouse Road/Newtown Richboro Road). Following the PA 332 junction, the road narrows to two lanes and passes more residential areas, with Worthington Mill Road branching to the northeast. As the route approaches the Sacketts Ford Road intersection, the settings become more rural as the road passes near farms and woods with some homes.

The road crosses the Neshaminy Creek and turns northeast in Wrightstown Township. The road continues through agricultural areas and passes to the east of a quarry following the Swamp Road junction. PA 232 curves north again and passes a mix of rural areas and residential and commercial development, intersecting Cherry Lane, prior to crossing PA 413 (Durham Road) in the community of Penns Park. Now named Windy Bush Road, the road continues past wooded areas of homes, crossing Jericho Creek. After the Pine Lane/Pineville Road intersection, the route enters Upper Makefield Township and continues through woodland before heading into farmland.

A short distance past the Street Road intersection, PA 232 passes into Solebury Township and crosses the Pidcock Creek. The road continues through a mix of farms and woods with some residential areas. As the route approaches Aquetong Road, the surroundings become more forested and the road parallels Dark Hollow Run, briefly passing through farm fields. The road enters the borough of New Hope, where it ends at a junction with PA 32 (South Main Street).

== History ==
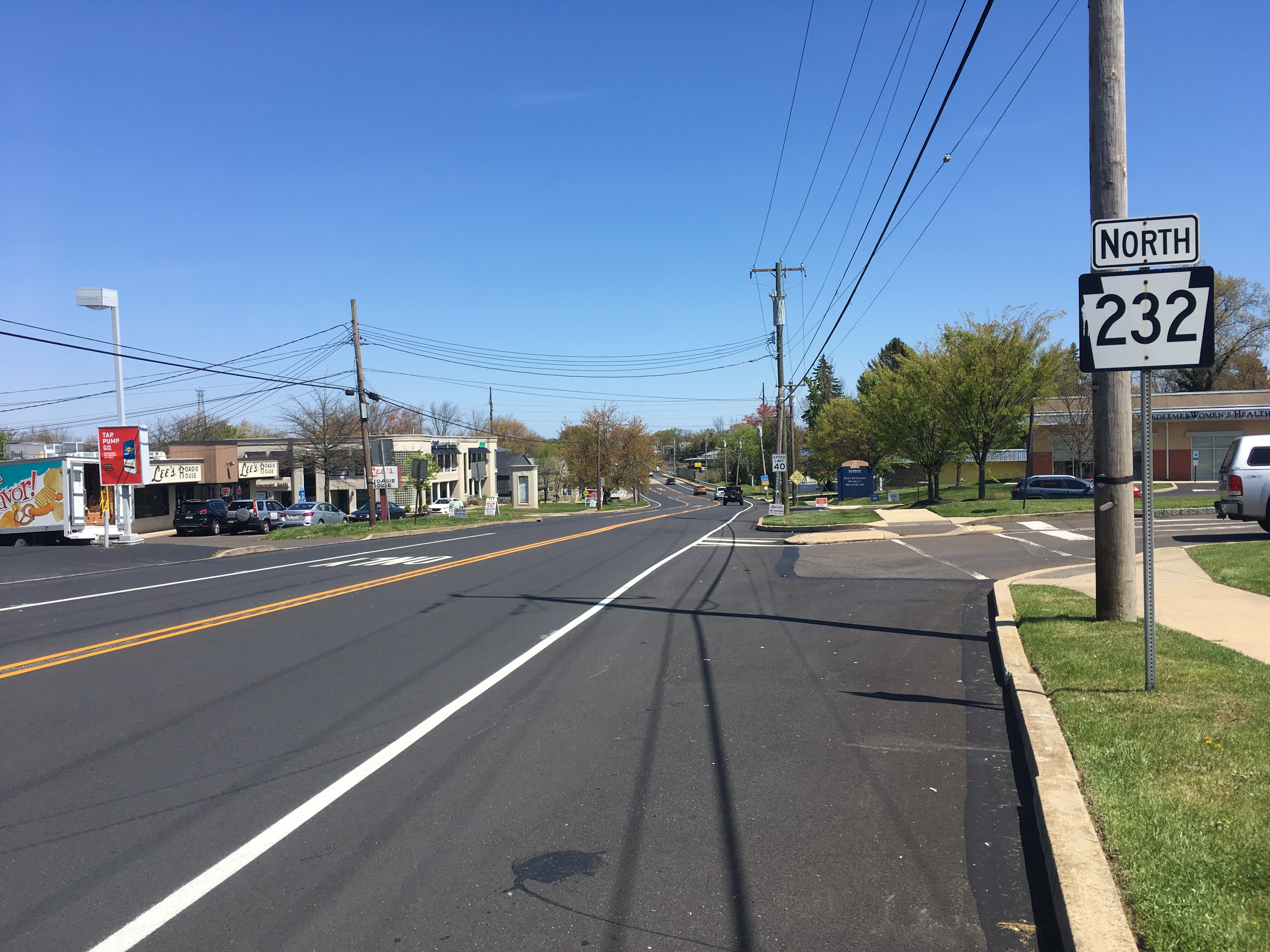
PA 232 northbound past County Line Road in Upper Southampton Township

In colonial times, the current alignment of PA 232 was referred to as the Middle Road because it was roughly midway between Old York Road and Bustleton Pike. What is now PA 232 in Montgomery County was originally chartered in 1846 as the Fox Chase and Huntingdon Valley Turnpike. This road was a turnpike that connected the Fox Chase area and ran through eastern Montgomery County to County Line Road at the Bucks County border. Further south into Philadelphia, the road was known variously as Oxford Avenue, Oxford Pike, and Oxford Turnpike. The Fox Chase and Huntingdon Valley Turnpike was also known as the Second Street Turnpike. The Second Street Pike continued the Huntington Pike north from the border of Montgomery and Bucks counties to Wrightstown in Bucks County and served as a route for farmers into Philadelphia.

In 1928, PA 232 was designated between PA 532 in Northeast Philadelphia and PA 32 in New Hope, following Welsh Road to PA 63 in Bethayres before turning north along its current alignment to PA 113 (now PA 413), where it headed northwest concurrent with PA 113 to Pineville and turned northeast onto Pine Lane before picking up its current alignment to New Hope. The present-day route from PA 63 south to PA 73 in Philadelphia was designated as PA 163. PA 232 was rerouted to head south and replace PA 163 between Bethayres and Philadelphia in 1937. The same year, PA 232 was realigned to bypass Pineville to the east. The route was extended further south down Oxford Avenue to US 1/US 13 at the Oxford Circle by 1960. Since then, there have been no alignment changes to PA 232.

== Major intersections ==
County	Location	mi	km	Destinations	Notes
Philadelphia	Philadelphia	0.000	0.000	US 1 / US 13 (Roosevelt Boulevard)	Oxford Circle; southern terminus
Philadelphia	Philadelphia	2.171	3.494	PA 73 (Cottman Avenue)	
Montgomery	Lower Moreland Township	6.893	11.093	PA 63 (Welsh Road / Philmont Avenue) – Willow Grove	
Bucks	Upper Southampton Township	11.020	17.735	PA 132 (Street Road)	
Bucks	Northampton Township	14.470	23.287	PA 332 (Almshouse Road / Newtown Richboro Road) – Jamison, Ivyland, Newtown	
Bucks	Wrightstown Township	19.242	30.967	PA 413 (Durham Road)	
Bucks	New Hope	25.157	40.486	PA 32 (South Main Street) – Lumberville, Washington Crossing	Northern terminus
1.000 mi = 1.609 km; 1.000 km = 0.621 mi
