= Ironworks Creek =

Location
- Country: United States
- State: Pennsylvania
- County: Bucks County
- Township: Northampton Township

Physical characteristics
- Source
  - location: Northampton Township, Bucks County, Pennsylvania, United States
  - coordinates: 40°13′15″N 75°00′45″W
- Mouth
  - location: Northampton Township, Bucks County, Pennsylvania, United States
  - coordinates: 40°10′18″N 74°59′14″W
  - elevation: 69 ft (21 m)
- Basin size: 6.33 mi^{2} (16.4 km^{2})

Ironworks Creek (Earth)
Ironworks Creek (the United States)
Ironworks Creek (Pennsylvania)

Ironworks Creek is a tributary of Mill Creek in Northampton Township, Bucks County, Pennsylvania, part of the Neshaminy Creek, and of the Delaware River watersheds.

== Statistics ==
Rising near Richboro, Ironworks creek flows in a generally south and southeasterly course passing through Springfield Lake finally meeting its confluence at Mill Creek's 1.90 river mile, its watershed is approximately 6.33 square miles (16.4 km^{2}).

Pennsylvania Department of Environmental Protection designation is 02526.
US Geological Survey designation is 1192672.

== Tributaries ==
Ironworks Creek has three unnamed tributaries, one of which joins within the Churchville Reservoir, a lake constructed in 1942 by damming up a section of the creek. The Churchville Nature Center, a facility of the Bucks County Parks and Recreation that operates a 55 acre environmental education center and nature preserve adjacent to the reservoir, works on protecting the 700+ acres of the watershed formed around the Ironworks Creek.

== Geology ==
Ironworks Creek lies within the Stockton Formation, a sedimentary layer of rock laid down during the Triassic. Mineralogy includes sandstone, arkosic sandstone, siltstone, shale, and mudstone.

== Municipalities ==
The stream and it tributaries lie wholly within Northampton Township.

== Crossings and Bridges ==
Crossing	NBI Number	Length	Lanes	Spans	Material/Design	Built	Reconstructed	Latitude	Longitude
Pennsylvania Route 532 (Buck Road)	-	-	-	-	-	-	-	-	-
Chinquapin Road	7208	15 metres (49 ft)	2	1	Prestressed concrete Box Beam or Girder	1966	2015	40°10'25.6"N	74°59'22"W
Lower Holland Road	7631	33.1 metres (109 ft)	2	1	Cast-in-place concrete Stringer/Multi-beam or girder	1952	-	40°11'54.5"N	75°0'39.3"W
Bustleton Pike	-	-	-	-	-	-	-	-	-
Willow Road	7629	9 metres (30 ft)	2	1	Prestressed concrete Box Beam or Girders	1962	1977	40°11'59.66"N	75°0'43.5"W
Tanyard Road	-	-	-	-	-	-	-	-	-
Second Street Pike	-	-	-	-	-	-	-	-	-
Pennsylvania Route 332 (Almshouse Road)	-	-	-	-	-	-	-	-	-

== See also ==
- List of rivers of Pennsylvania
- List of rivers of the United States
- List of Delaware River tributaries
