= Mill Creek (Neshaminy Creek tributary, Northampton Township) =

Location
- Country: United States
- State: Pennsylvania
- County: Bucks County
- Township: Northampton Township, Lower Southampton Township, Upper Southampton Township

Physical characteristics
- Source
  - location: Upper Southampton Township, Bucks County, Pennsylvania, United States
  - coordinates: 40°11′29″N 75°1′57″W
- Mouth
  - location: Northampton Township, Bucks County, Pennsylvania, United States
  - coordinates: 40°10′43″N 74°57′26″W
  - elevation: 49 ft (15 m)
- Basin size: 17.40 mi^{2} (45.1 km^{2})

Basin features
- Tributaries
  - right: Pine Run, Ironworks Creek

Mill Creek (Earth)
Mill Creek (the United States)
Mill Creek (Pennsylvania)

Mill Creek is a tributary of Neshaminy Creek rising in Upper Southampton Township in Bucks County, Pennsylvania, United States. It is one of at least six creeks in Bucks County bearing the same name. The upper portion of Mill Creek was formerly known as Broad Axe Creek.

== Statistics ==
Mill Creek rises near the intersection of Pennsylvania Route 232 and Bristol Road in Upper Southampton, travels through the northern corner of Lower Southampton Township, then easterly through the lower part of Northampton Township where it meets Neshaminy Creek at the latter's 11.25 river mile. Mill Creek's drainage basin is approximately 17.40 square miles (45.1 km^{2}).

Pennsylvania Department of Environmental Protection designation is 02519.

US Geological Survey designation is 1192933.

== Tributaries ==
- Pine Run
- Ironworks Creek

== Geology ==
- Appalachian Highlands Division
  - Piedmont Province
    - Gettysburg-Newark Lowland Section
      - Stockton Formation

Mill Creek lies in the Stockton Formation, a sedimentary layer of rock laid down during the Triassic. Mineralogy includes coarse-grained arkosic and other sandstone, shale, siltstone, and mudstone. Mill Creek meets the Neshaminy at the Fall Line between the Piedmont Province and the Atlantic Coastal Plain.

== Municipalities ==
- Northampton Township
- Lower Southampton Township
- Upper Southampton Township

== Crossings and bridges ==
Crossing	NBI Number	Length	Lanes	Spans	Material/Design	Built	Reconstructed	Coordinates
Cherry Blossom Drive	-	-	-	-	-	-	-	40°11′51″N 75°2′20″W
Pennsylvania Route 232 (North Second Street Pike) & Bristol Road	-	-	-	-	-	-	-	40°11′28″N 75°1′56″W
Churchville Road	45523	15 metres (49 ft)	2	1	prestressed concrete lob box beam or girder	2009	-	40°10′44.4″N 75°1′21.72″W
Rydal Lane	-	-	-	-	-	-	-	40°10′39″N 75°1′5″W
Gravel Hill Road	7511	10 metres (33 ft)	1	2	masonry long Arch-Deck	1996	-	40°10′29.2″N 75°0′51.8″W
Bustletown Pike	7299	9 metres (30 ft)	2	1	Concrete long slab	1965	-	40°10′12.6″N 75°0′31.02″W
West Bristol Road	-	-	-	-	-	-	-	40°10′7″N 74°59′55″W
Buck Road	7045	35 metres (115 ft)	2	2	Prestressed concrete long box beam or girder	1932	1984	40°10′17.8″N 74°59′14.2″W
Bridgetown Pike	-	-	-	-	-	-	-	40°10′41″N 74°57′47″W

== See also ==
- List of rivers of Pennsylvania
- List of rivers of the United States
- List of Delaware River tributaries
