= Pine Run (Mill Creek, Neshaminy Creek tributary) =

- Location within Pennsylvania

Location
- Country: United States
- State: Pennsylvania
- County: Bucks
- Township: Northampton

Physical characteristics
- Source
  - coordinates: 40°11′53″N 74°58′46″W
  - elevation: 180 feet (55 m)
- Mouth
  - coordinates: 40°10′44″N 74°57′34″W
  - elevation: 56 feet (17 m)
- Length: 2.14 miles (3.44 km)
- Basin size: 2.66 square miles (6.9 km^{2})

Basin features
- Progression: Pine Run → Mill Creek → Neshaminy Creek → Delaware River → Delaware Bay
- River system: Delaware River
- Slope: 57.94 feet per mile (10.973 m/km)

Pine Creek is a tributary of Mill Creek, which, in turn, is a tributary of the Neshaminy Creek, part of the Delaware River watershed.

== Statistics ==
Rising in Northampton Township, Pine Run flows in a southerly direction for about one-third its length before turning easterly, the finally southerly again to its confluence with Mill Creek at its 0.15 river mile. The watershed is about 2.66 square miles (6.9 km^{2}).

Pennsylvania Department of Environmental Protection designation is 02520.
US Geological Survey designation is 1183875.

== Geology ==
- Appalachian Highlands Division
  - Piedmont Province
    - Gettysburg-Newark Lowland Section
      - Stockton Formation

Pine Run lies within the Stockton Formation, a sedimentary layer of rock laid down during the Triassic. Mineralogy includes sandstone, arkosic sandstone, shale, siltstone, and mudstone.

== Municipalities ==
Pine Run lies completely within Northampton Township.

== Crossings and bridges ==
Crossing	NBI Number	Length	Lanes	Spans	Material/Design	Built	Reconstructed	Latitude	Longitude
Bridgetown Pike	7172	8 metres (26 ft)	2	1	Concrete slab	1966		40°10'50.8"N	74°57'31.49"W
Wooden Bridge Road	-	-	-	-	-	-	-	-	-
Pennsylvania Route 532 (Buck Road)	-	-	-	-	-	-	-	-	-

== See also ==
- List of rivers of Pennsylvania
- List of rivers of the United States
- List of Delaware River tributaries
