= Pennsylvania Route 532 =

State highway in Pennsylvania, US

Pennsylvania Route 532
- PA 532 in red and PA 532 Truck in blue

Route information
- Maintained by PennDOT
- Length: 19.125 mi (30.779 km)

Major junctions
- South end: US 1 in Philadelphia
- PA 63 in Philadelphia; PA 132 in Feasterville; PA 213 in Feasterville; PA 332 / PA 413 in Newtown
- North end: PA 32 in Washington Crossing

Location
- Country: United States
- State: Pennsylvania
- Counties: Philadelphia, Bucks

Highway system
- Pennsylvania State Route System; Interstate; US; State; Scenic; Legislative
← PA 531	→ PA 533

Pennsylvania Route 532 (PA 532) is a 19.1-mile-long (30.7 km) state route located in the Philadelphia, Pennsylvania area. The route runs from an intersection with U.S. Route 1 (US 1) in Northeast Philadelphia north to an intersection with PA 32 in Washington Crossing near the Washington Crossing Bridge over the Delaware River. The route passes through developed areas in Northeast Philadelphia before heading north through suburban Bucks County, serving Feasterville, Holland, and Newtown before coming to Washington Crossing.

Most of the portion of PA 532 south of Feasterville was chartered as the Bustleton and Somerton Turnpike in 1840. This road in Philadelphia became known as Bustleton Avenue in 1903. PA 532 was designated in 1928 to run from US 1 in Northeast Philadelphia to PA 32 in Yardley while PA 632 was designated on the route between Newtown and Washington Crossing. In 1946, PA 532 was rerouted to Washington Crossing, replacing PA 632, while the road between Newtown and Yardley became an extension of PA 332. The Newtown Bypass was built in 1977 and PA 532 was rerouted onto it in 1991.

== Route description ==
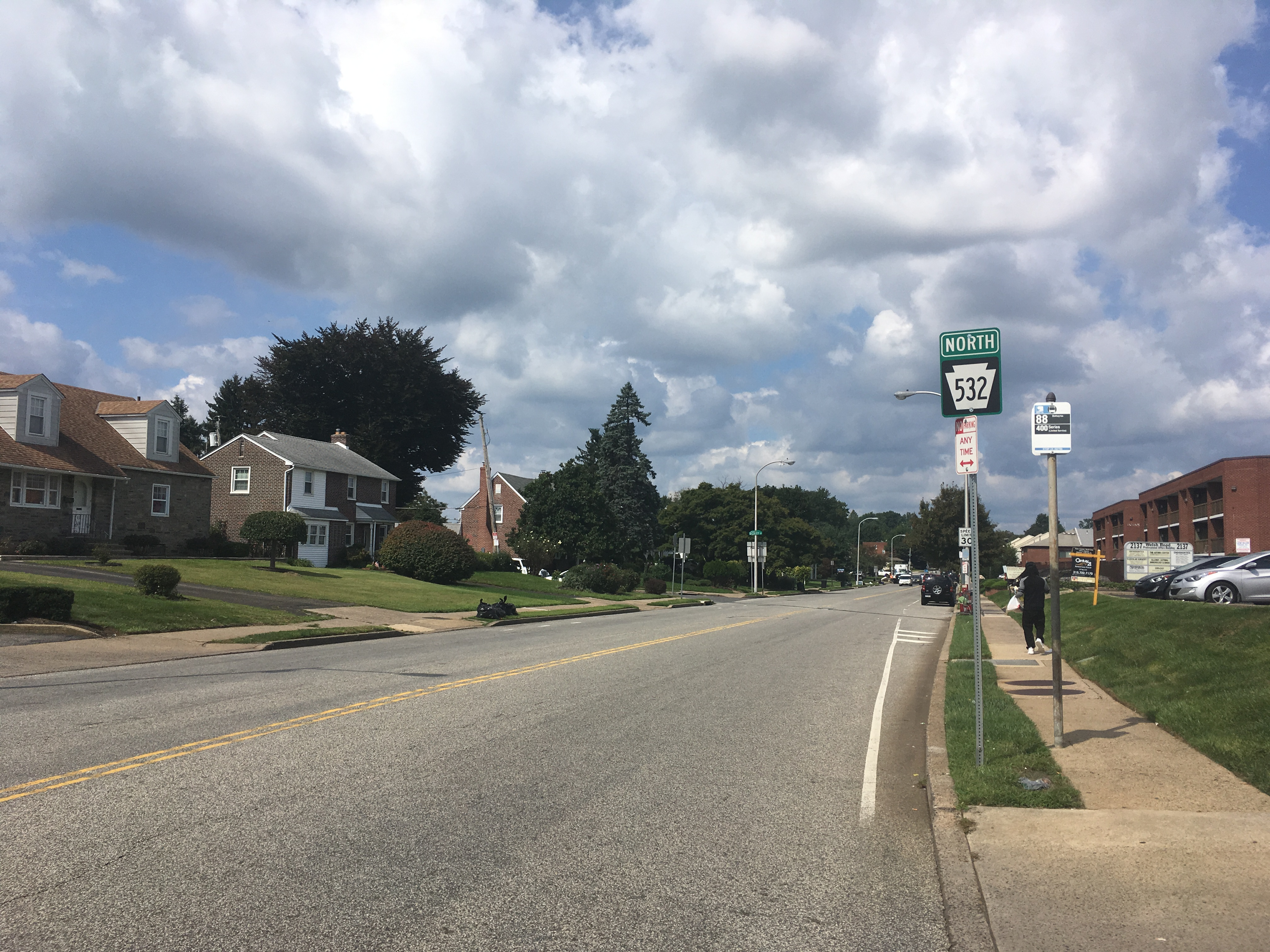
PA 532 northbound past its southern terminus at US 1 (Roosevelt Boulevard) in Northeast Philadelphia

PA 532 begins at an intersection with US 1 (Roosevelt Boulevard) in the Northeast Philadelphia section of the city of Philadelphia in Philadelphia County, heading north-northwest on two-lane undivided Welsh Road. The road passes through residential areas before running past businesses. The route briefly becomes Old Bustleton Avenue before it turns northeast onto Bustleton Avenue, a four-lane undivided road with some segments having a center left-turn lane. PA 532 crosses Grant Avenue and continues through areas of homes and businesses in the Bustleton neighborhood, curving north and coming to a bridge over CSX's Trenton Subdivision railroad line. The road runs past more houses, businesses and apartments, crossing PA 63. The route passes to the west of George Washington High School and intersects Verree Road as it continues through more developed areas, heading northeast into the Somerton neighborhood. PA 532 crosses Byberry Road and continues north, coming to a bridge over SEPTA's West Trenton Line west of the Somerton station. The route crosses Philmont Avenue and curves northeast, reaching an intersection with County Line Road.

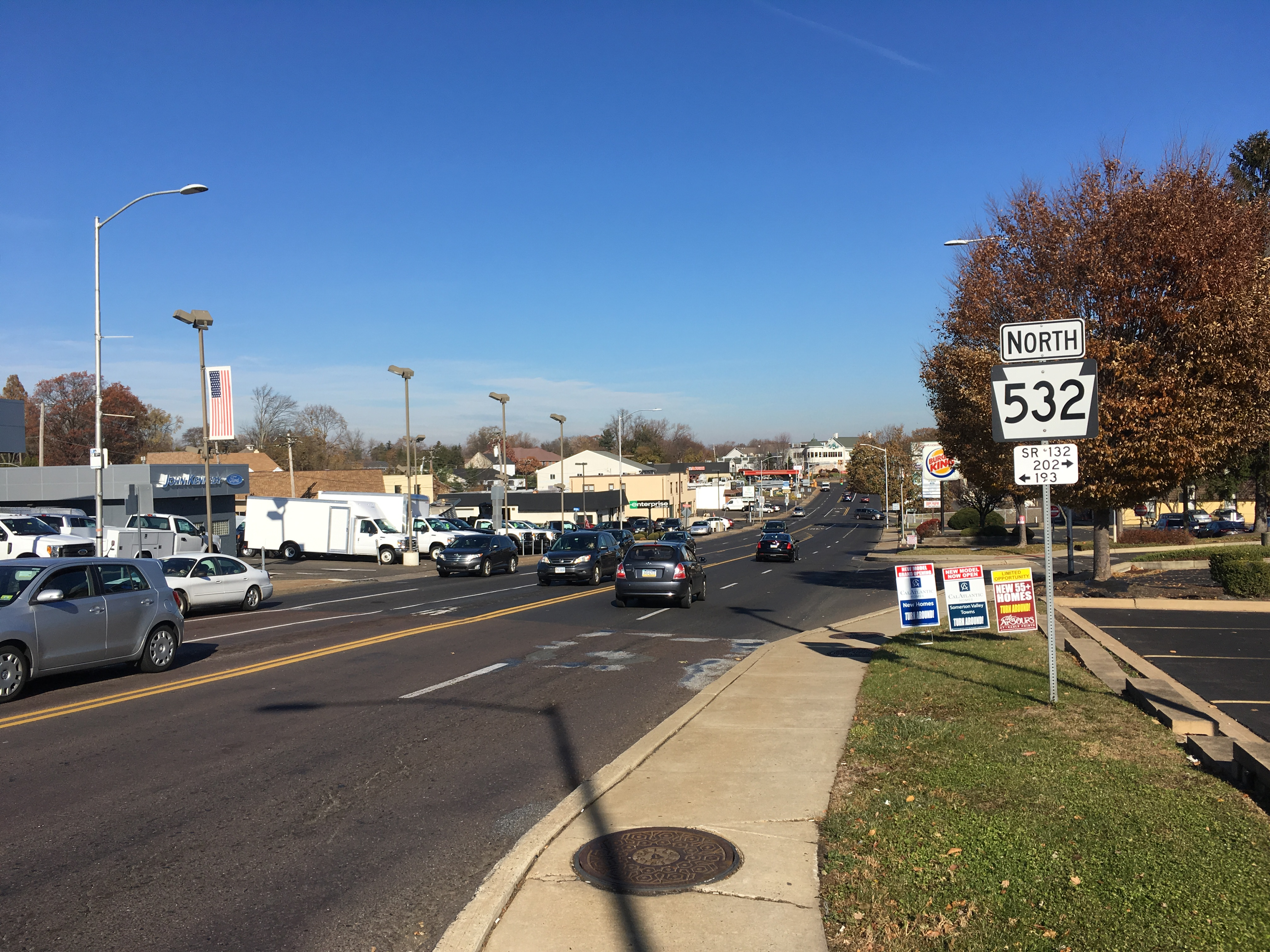
PA 532 northbound past PA 132 in Feasterville

Upon crossing County Line Road, PA 532 enters Lower Southampton Township in Bucks County, where the name of the road changes to Bustleton Pike. The route heads north as a five-lane road with a center left-turn lane, passing through suburban business areas with nearby residential areas. The road comes to a bridge over the Pennsylvania Turnpike (Interstate 276) and continues to an intersection with PA 132 in Feasterville. Past this intersection, PA 532 passes more commercial establishments and splits from Bustleton Pike by turning northeast onto four-lane undivided Bridgetown Pike. A short distance later, PA 532 turns north onto two-lane undivided Buck Road, with PA 213 continuing along Bridgetown Pike. PA 532 curves northeast and passes through wooded residential areas. The road enters Northampton Township and passes under Norfolk Southern's Morrisville Line before heading past businesses in the community of Holland. At an intersection with Old Bristol Road, the route curves to the north before crossing Mill Creek and Ironworks Creek near their confluence and turning northeast at an intersection with Holland Road. PA 532 passes through areas of wooded residential subdivisions, crossing Pine Run and heading to the east of Holland Middle School. The road passes under the abandoned Fox Chase/Newtown railroad line before heading into the community of Village Shires, where it runs to the west of the Village Shires Shopping Center. After passing through Village Shires, the route crosses the Neshaminy Creek and enters Newtown Township. Here, PA 532 widens into a four-lane road and passes more residential subdivisions before coming to an intersection with PA 332/PA 413.

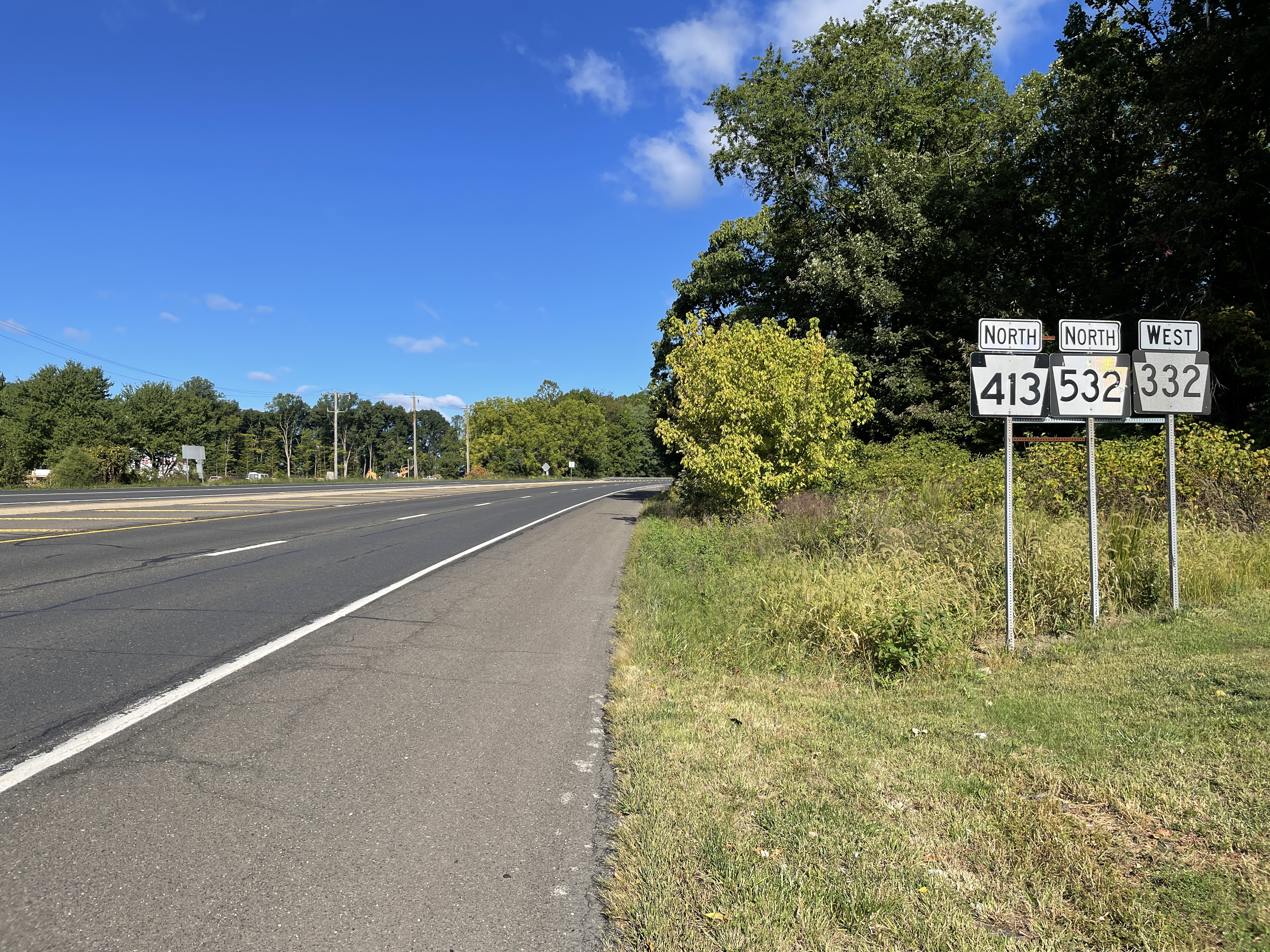
PA 532 northbound along with PA 332 westbound and PA 413 northbound on the Newtown Bypass

At this point, PA 532 turns northwest and joins PA 332/PA 413 in a concurrency on the four-lane divided Newtown Bypass, with Sycamore Street continuing northeast into the borough of Newtown. The bypass turns north and passes through wooded areas with nearby residential development. PA 332 splits from the Newtown Bypass by heading west on Richboro Road while PA 413/PA 532 continue to the north on the bypass. The roadway passes over an access road to Council Rock High School North before it heads to the east of Tyler State Park, curving to the northwest. At the entrance to the park, PA 413/PA 532 turn northeast to remain on the Newtown Bypass while Swamp Road heads to the northwest. The road passes between a residential development to the northwest and a shopping center to the southeast before the Newtown Bypass ends at an intersection with Durham Road, at which point PA 413 heads north on Durham Road and PA 532 heads east on Durham Road. The route narrows to a two-lane undivided road and comes to another intersection with Sycamore Street.

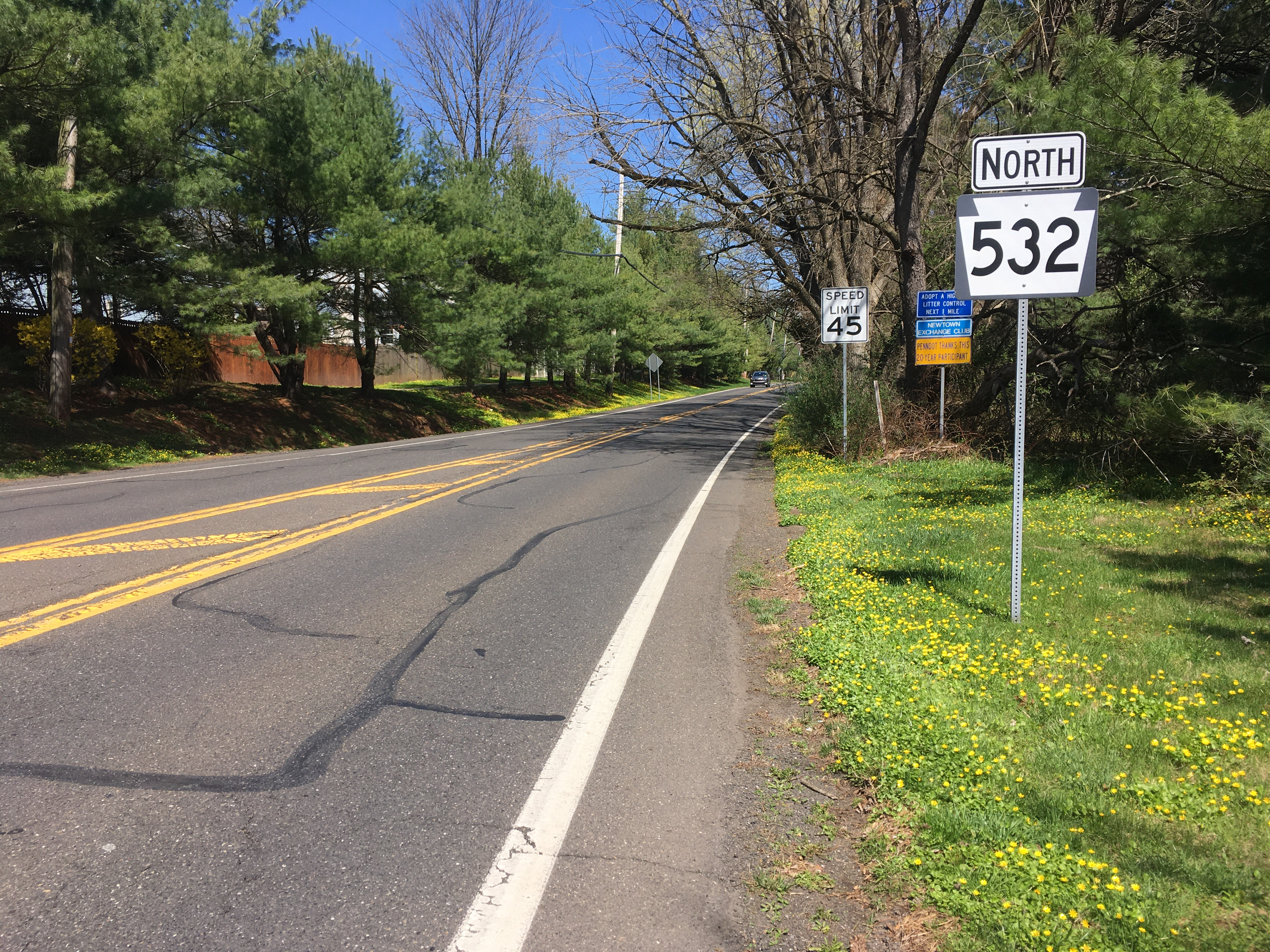
PA 532 northbound north of Newtown

At this point, PA 532 turns north and runs along Washington Crossing Road, passing through a mix of woods and residential neighborhoods. The road curves to the northeast and crosses Newtown Creek. The route heads into a mix of fields and woodland with some residences, crossing into Lower Makefield Township. At the Stoopville Road intersection, PA 532 turns east and runs along the border between Upper Makefield Township to the north and Lower Makefield Township, passing to the south of Washington Crossing National Cemetery. The route fully enters Upper Makefield Township and turns north at the Dolington Road intersection in the community of Dolington. The road curves northeast and runs through more areas of farms and woods with occasional homes, crossing Houghs Creek. PA 532 comes to a junction with Taylorsville Road in the community of Taylorsville, at which point the name changes to General Washington Memorial Boulevard. The road crosses the Delaware Canal and runs past homes and businesses. PA 532 reaches its northern terminus at an intersection with PA 32 in the community of Washington Crossing. Past this intersection, the road continues as State Route 2070, an unsigned quadrant route, and heads over the Delaware River on the Washington Crossing Bridge into New Jersey, where the road intersects Route 29 on the other side of the river and becomes County Route 546 past that intersection.

== History ==
Pennsylvania Route 632
- Location: Newtown – Washington Crossing
- Existed: 1928–1946

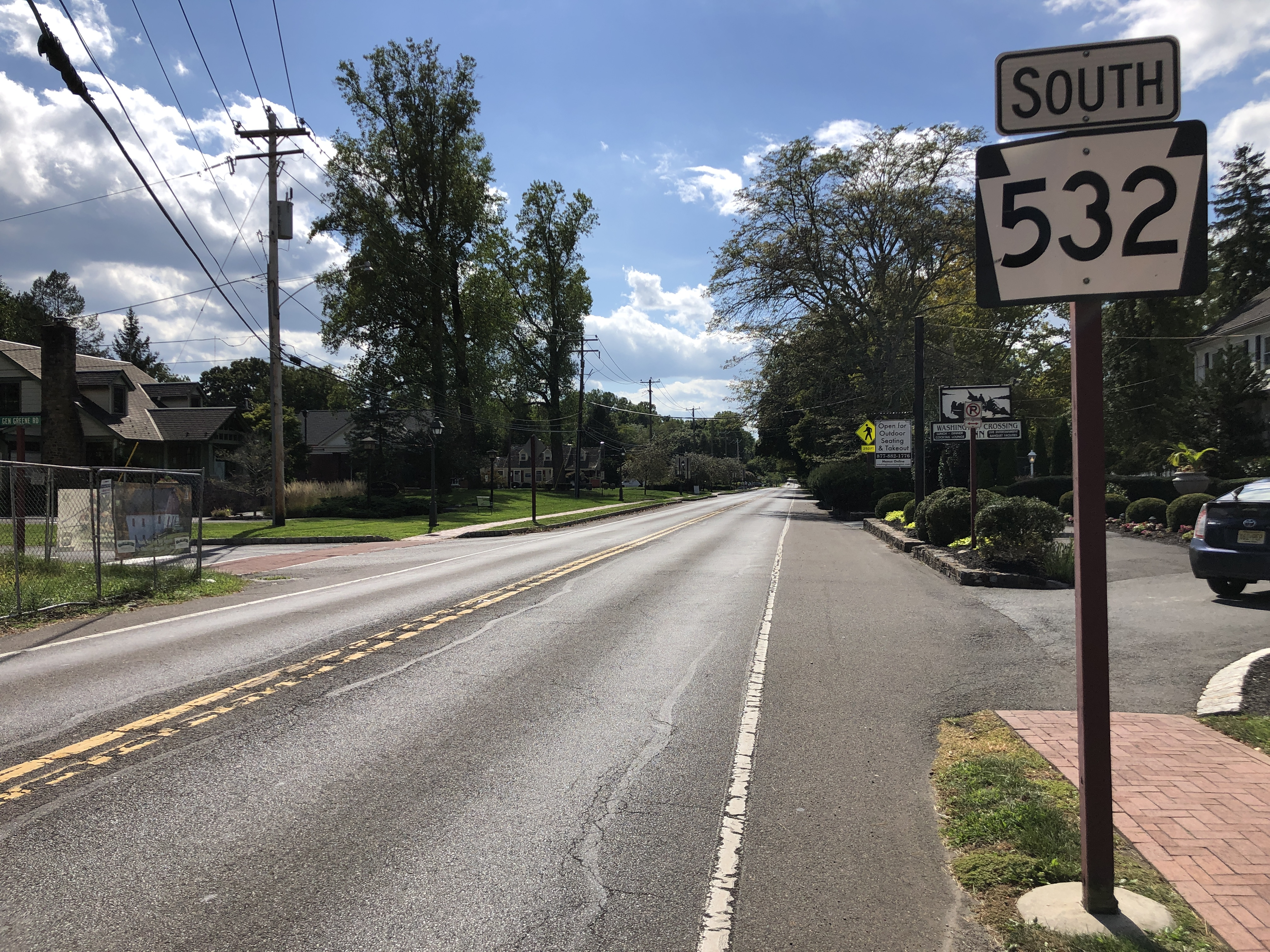
PA 532 southbound past PA 32 in Washington Crossing

The Bustleton and Somerton Turnpike, a turnpike, was incorporated on April 14, 1840, running through present-day Northeast Philadelphia. In 1872, the Bustleton and Somerton Turnpike was combined with the Richborough and Feasterville Turnpike Road to form one continuous turnpike. The city of Philadelphia approved renaming the Bustleton and Somerton Turnpike within the city to Bustleton Avenue in 1903. When Pennsylvania legislated its state highways in 1911, what would become PA 532 was legislated as part of Legislative Route 252 between Newtown and Yardley. In 1928, PA 532 was designated to run from US 1 in Northeast Philadelphia north to PA 32 in Yardley, following its current alignment to Newtown, where it turned east and ran to Yardley. The portion of the current route between Newtown and Washington Crossing was designated as PA 632.

PA 532 was rerouted to its current alignment between Newtown and Washington Crossing in 1946, replacing PA 632. The former alignment of PA 532 between Newtown and Yardley became an extended PA 332. In 1977, the Newtown Bypass to the west of Newtown was built as part of a bypass of the town for PA 413; PA 532 still continued through Newtown at this time. PA 532 was rerouted to bypass Newtown along with PA 332 in 1991. The former alignment of PA 532 through Newtown followed Sycamore Street. On April 22, 2014, the portion of PA 532 along the Newtown Bypass was renamed the Officer Gregg Memorial Bypass in honor of Brian S. Gregg, a borough of Newtown police officer who was killed in the line of duty on September 29, 2005.

== Major intersections ==
County	Location	mi	km	Destinations	Notes
Philadelphia	Philadelphia	0.000	0.000	US 1 (Roosevelt Boulevard)	Southern terminus
Philadelphia	Philadelphia	2.113	3.401	PA 63 (Red Lion Road)	
Bucks	Lower Southampton Township	5.762	9.273	PA 132 (Street Road)	
Bucks	Lower Southampton Township	6.074	9.775	PA 213 north (Bridgetown Pike) – Langhorne	Southern terminus of PA 213
Bucks	Newtown Township	11.519	18.538	PA 332 east / PA 413 south (Newtown Bypass) – Yardley, Langhorne	Southern terminus of concurrency
Bucks	Newtown Township	12.102	19.476	PA 332 west (Richboro Road) – Richboro	Northern terminus of concurrency
Bucks	Newtown Township	12.973	20.878	PA 413 north (Durham Road) – Buckingham	Northern terminus of concurrency
Bucks	Upper Makefield Township	19.125	30.779	PA 32 (River Road) – New Hope, Yardley	Northern terminus
1.000 mi = 1.609 km; 1.000 km = 0.621 mi: Concurrency terminus

== PA 532 Alternate Truck ==
PA Route 532 Alternate Truck
- Location: Bucks County
- Existed: 2013–present

Pennsylvania Route 532 Alternate Truck is a truck route bypassing a weight-restricted bridge over the Delaware Canal in Upper Makefield Township, on which trucks over 29 tons and combination loads over 35 tons are prohibited. Formed in 2013, it follows Taylorsville Road and PA 32.

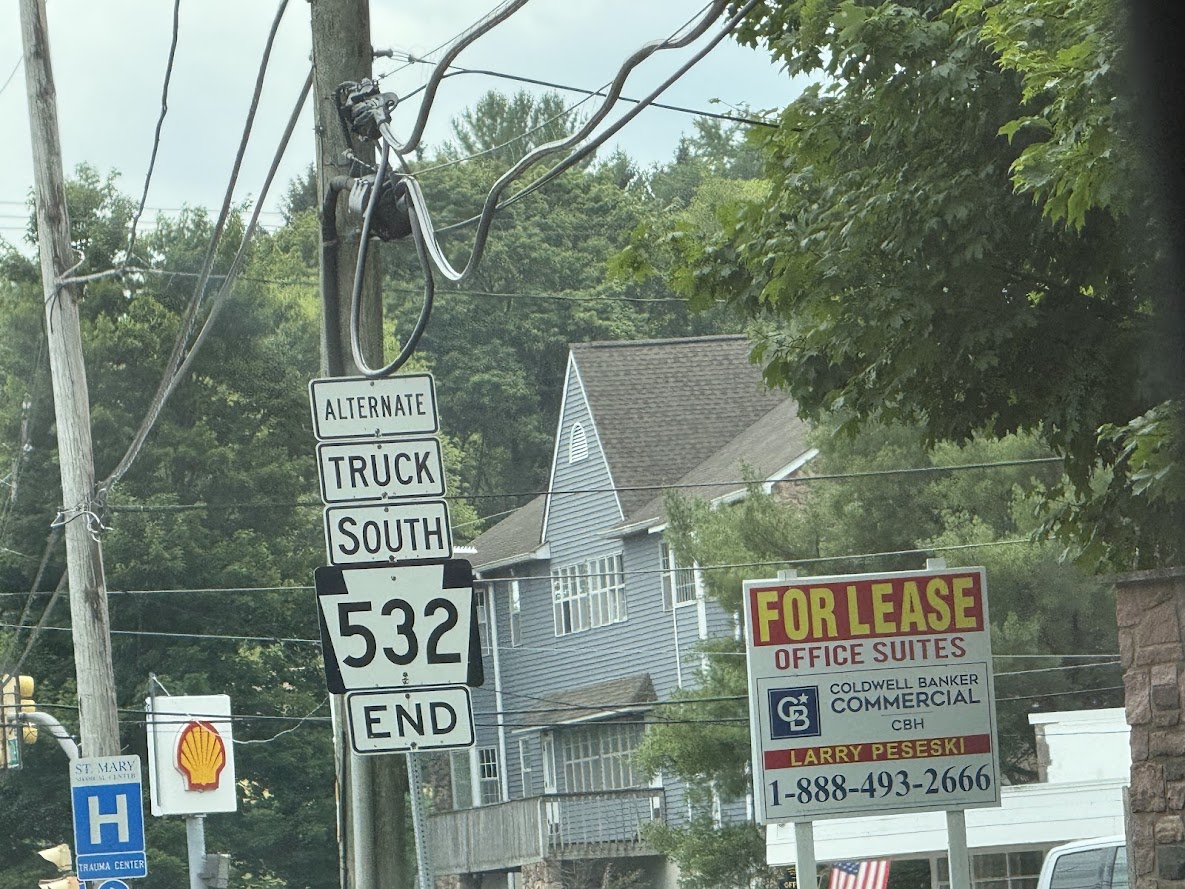
PA 532 Alternate Truck ends southbound along Taylorsville Road in Washington Crossing.
