= Mainland, Pennsylvania =

Unincorporated community in Pennsylvania, US

- Unincorporated community
- Location within Pennsylvania Location within the United States
- Coordinates: 40°15′21″N 75°21′37″W
- Country: United States
- State: Pennsylvania
- County: Montgomery
- Township: Lower Salford
- Elevation: 226 ft (69 m)
- Time zone: UTC-5 (Eastern (EST))
  - Summer (DST): UTC-4 (EDT)
- ZIP code: 19438
- Area codes: 215, 267, and 445
- GNIS feature ID: 1204087

Mainland is an unincorporated community in Lower Salford Township, Montgomery County, Pennsylvania, United States. Mainland is located at the intersection of Mainland Road and Store Road, with Pennsylvania Route 63 bypassing the community to the northeast.
