= Pennsylvania Route 63 =

State highway in Pennsylvania, US

Pennsylvania Route 63
- Map of southeastern Pennsylvania with PA 63 highlighted in red

Route information
- Maintained by PennDOT and City of Philadelphia
- Length: 37.417 mi (60.217 km)
- Existed: by 1927–present

Major junctions
- West end: PA 29 in Green Lane
- PA 113 in Harleysville; I-476 Toll / Penna Turnpike NE Extension in Kulpsville; PA 363 in Lansdale; US 202 near North Wales; PA 309 near North Wales; PA 152 in Maple Glen; PA 611 in Willow Grove; PA 232 in Huntingdon Valley; US 1 in Philadelphia; US 13 in Bensalem Township
- East end: I-95 in Bensalem Township

Location
- Country: United States
- State: Pennsylvania
- Counties: Montgomery, Philadelphia, Bucks

Highway system
- Pennsylvania State Route System; Interstate; US; State; Scenic; Legislative
← PA 62	→ PA 64

Pennsylvania Route 63 (PA 63) is a 37.4-mile-long (60.2 km) state highway located in the Philadelphia, Pennsylvania, area. The western terminus of the route is at PA 29 in Green Lane, Montgomery County. The eastern terminus is at Interstate 95 (I-95) in Bensalem Township, Bucks County. PA 63 runs northwest to southeast for most of its length. The route heads through a mix of suburban and rural areas of northern Montgomery County as a two-lane road, passing through Harleysville, before coming to an interchange with I-476 (Pennsylvania Turnpike Northeast Extension) in Kulpsville. From this point, PA 63 continues through predominantly suburban areas of eastern Montgomery County as a two- to four-lane road, passing through Lansdale, Maple Glen, Willow Grove, and Huntingdon Valley. Upon entering Northeast Philadelphia, the route follows Red Lion Road and U.S. Route 1 (US 1) before heading southeast on a freeway called Woodhaven Road to I-95.

What would become PA 63 was originally designated as Legislative Route 198 in 1911, running from Green Lane to Northeast Philadelphia. When first designated, PA 63 ran from PA 29 in Green Lane east to US 611 (now PA 611) in Willow Grove, following its current alignment. In 1928, it was extended east to PA 532 in Northeast Philadelphia, following Edge Hill Road, Terwood Road, and Welsh Road to Bethayres, where the route continued along Philmont Avenue to PA 532. By 1940, PA 63 was moved to its current alignment between Willow Grove and Bethayres and was realigned to follow Byberry Road to PA 532. The former alignment of PA 63 on Edge Hill Road and Terwood Road became PA 163, which was removed by 1950. In the 1950s, the Woodhaven Road freeway was planned to serve Northeast Philadelphia, connecting I-95 to PA 63 at Philmont Avenue, with a further extension northwest to I-276 (Pennsylvania Turnpike) in Southampton once planned. The freeway was completed to Evans Street just west of US 1 in the 1960s and PA 63 was extended along Byberry Road and Woodhaven Road to end at I-95. In the 1980s, PA 63 was rerouted to use Red Lion Road and US 1 to reach Woodhaven Road. Plans to extend Woodhaven Road northwest through the rest of Northeast Philadelphia remain, but have been on hold due to community opposition and financial constraints.

== Route description ==
=== Green Lane to Lansdale ===
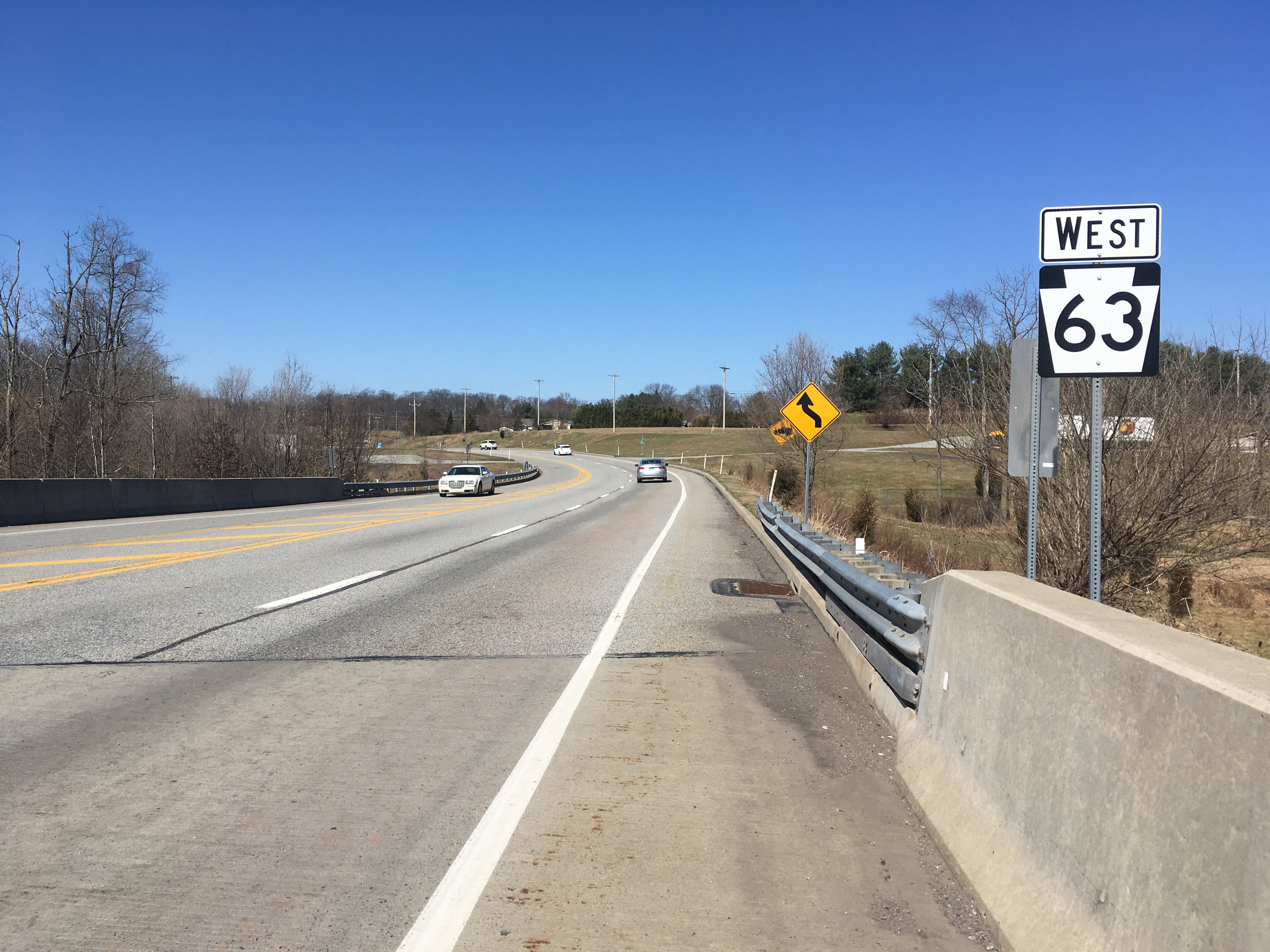
PA 63 westbound in Mainland

PA 63 begins at a T intersection with PA 29 (Gravel Pike) in the borough of Green Lane in Montgomery County. From this intersection, the route heads southeast as two-lane undivided Main Street, passing by several homes. After crossing Upper Ridge Road, the road enters Marlborough Township and becomes Sumneytown Pike. PA 63 continues through rural areas with some development, passing through the community of Sumneytown. Upon crossing Unami Creek, the route enters Upper Salford Township and heads into forested areas, where PA 63 meets the southern terminus of PA 563 (Ridge Road) and Old Skippack Road at an intersection. Following that intersection, the road passes through a mix of farmland, woodland, and residential developments, reaching a junction with Barndt Road. The route crosses over the East Branch Perkiomen Creek before entering Lower Salford Township at the intersection with Morwood Road. At this point, PA 63 becomes Main Street and heads into the community of Harleysville, where it passes through suburban residential neighborhoods before heading into a commercial area, crossing PA 113 (Harleysville Pike).

In the area of this intersection, PA 63 is briefly a divided highway. After PA 113, the road passes through the center of Harleysville. The road turns south, becoming a three-lane road with a center left-turn lane before it heads to the southeast again as a two-lane road, continuing past a mix of farm fields and residential and commercial development. PA 63 bypasses the community of Mainland to the northeast with two westbound lanes and one eastbound lane. After crossing Skippack Creek, the road enters Towamencin Township at the Wambold Road intersection, at which point it heads into the North Penn Valley region.

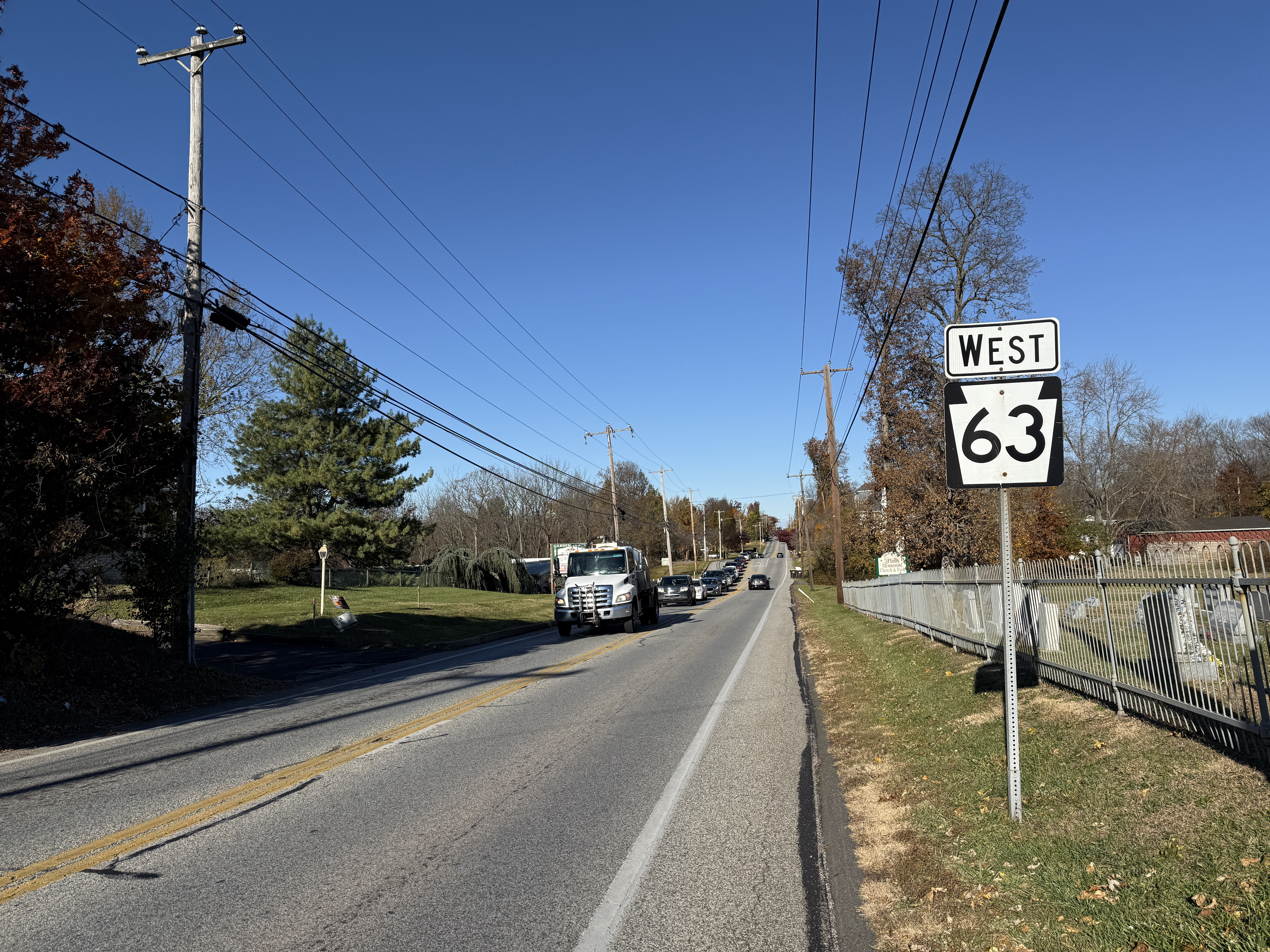
PA 63 westbound on the Towamencin–Hatfield township line

In Towamencin Township, PA 63 widens to four lanes and is called Sumneytown Pike again, passing woods and development before reaching the Lansdale interchange with I-476 (Pennsylvania Turnpike Northeast Extension). The I-476 interchange includes full access via a ramp passing through the toll plaza along with additional ramps to southbound I-476 and from northbound I-476. Southeast of I-476, the route enters a commercial area in the community of Kulpsville, where PA 63 turns northeast onto Forty Foot Road, a five-lane road with a center left-turn lane. The highway passes through suburban areas, narrowing to three lanes before widening back to five lanes. Along this stretch, the route passes southeast of Dock Mennonite Academy before crossing Allentown Road. A short distance later, PA 63 reaches a commercial area and turns southeast onto two-lane undivided Welsh Road, with Forty Foot Road continuing northeast toward the borough of Hatfield as PA 463. Along Welsh Road, PA 63 forms the border between Hatfield Township to the northeast and Towamencin Township to the southwest. The road heads through residential neighborhoods, crossing Orvilla Road.

At the intersection with Squirrel Lane/Oak Boulevard, PA 63 briefly forms the border between the borough of Lansdale to the northeast and Towamencin Township to the southwest before fully entering Lansdale and becoming Main Street. The road passes a mix of homes and businesses, coming to a junction with the northern terminus of PA 363 (Valley Forge Road). After the PA 363 junction, the road runs through the downtown area of Lansdale, where the route crosses the Liberty Bell Trail and SEPTA's Lansdale/Doylestown Line at-grade south of the Lansdale station before it intersects Broad Street. The road leaves the downtown and heads into areas of homes and businesses. At a crossing of Wissahickon Creek, PA 63 forms the border between Lansdale to the northeast and Upper Gwynedd Township to the southwest.

=== Lansdale to Philadelphia ===
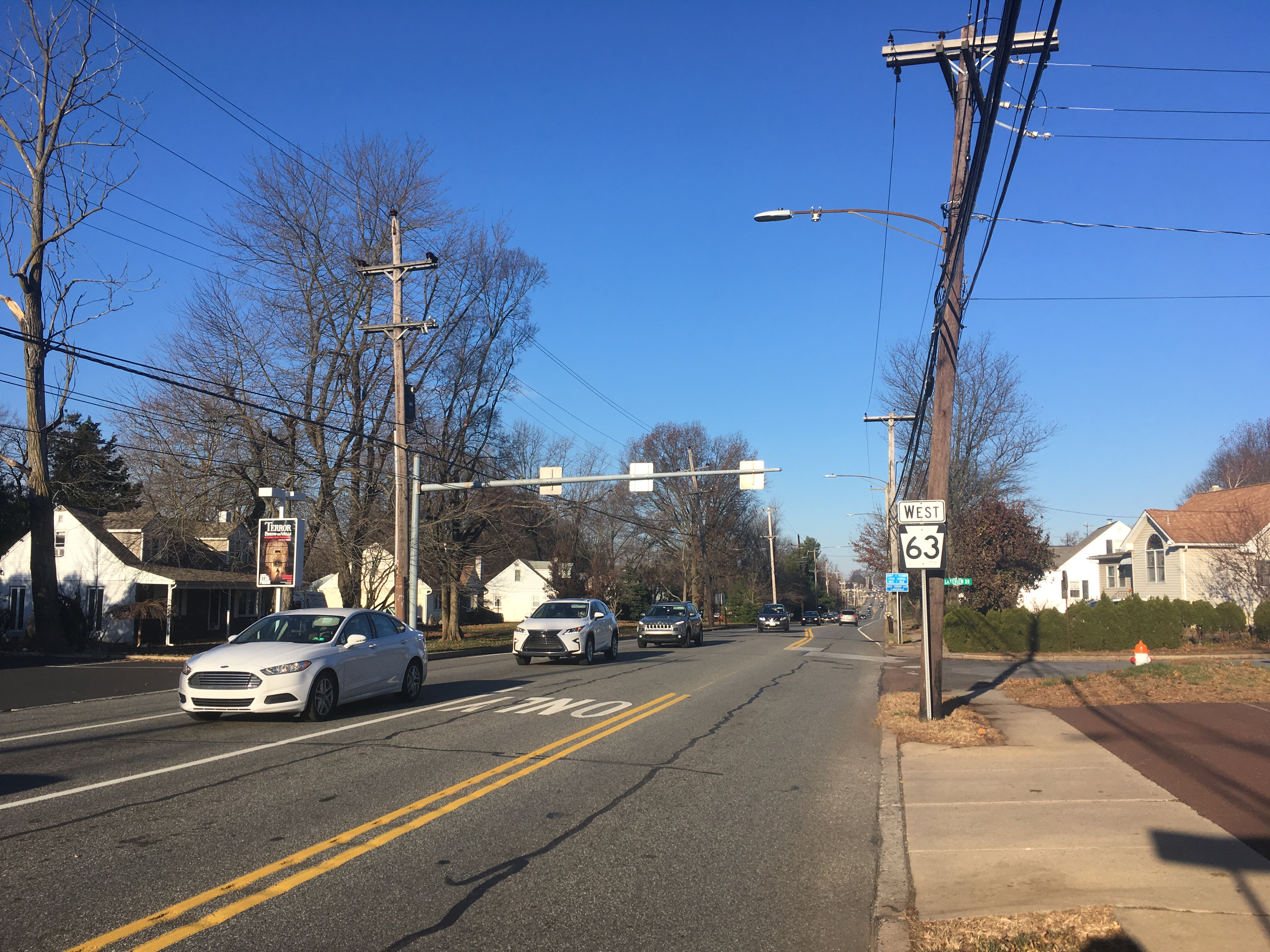
PA 63 westbound past North Wales Road in Lansdale

After intersecting North Wales Road, PA 63 runs along the border of Montgomery Township and Upper Gwynedd Township and again becomes Welsh Road, passing several businesses as a four-lane divided road. The route becomes a two-lane undivided road as it heads between business parks to the northeast and farms and woods to the southwest ahead of a junction with US 202 Bus. (Dekalb Pike). A short distance after intersecting the US 202 parkway and the southern terminus of the US 202 Parkway Trail, PA 63 forms the border between Montgomery Township to the northeast and Lower Gwynedd Township to the southwest. The road passes through a mix of residential and commercial development, widening into a three-lane road with two westbound lanes and one eastbound lane. PA 63 intersects Evans Road before it leaves the North Penn Valley region as it becomes the border between Horsham Township and Lower Gwynedd Township and crosses PA 309 (Bethlehem Pike), with jughandles controlling the movements from PA 309 to PA 63.

The route narrows back to two lanes as it passes residential subdivisions, crossing Park Creek before becoming the border between Horsham Township to the northeast and Upper Dublin Township to the southwest at the Tennis Avenue intersection. Farther southeast, the road comes to a junction with Butler Pike. Upon reaching the community of Maple Glen, PA 63 passes businesses and crosses PA 152 (Limekiln Pike) and Norristown Road. Past Maple Glen, the road continues past more homes along with a few farms.

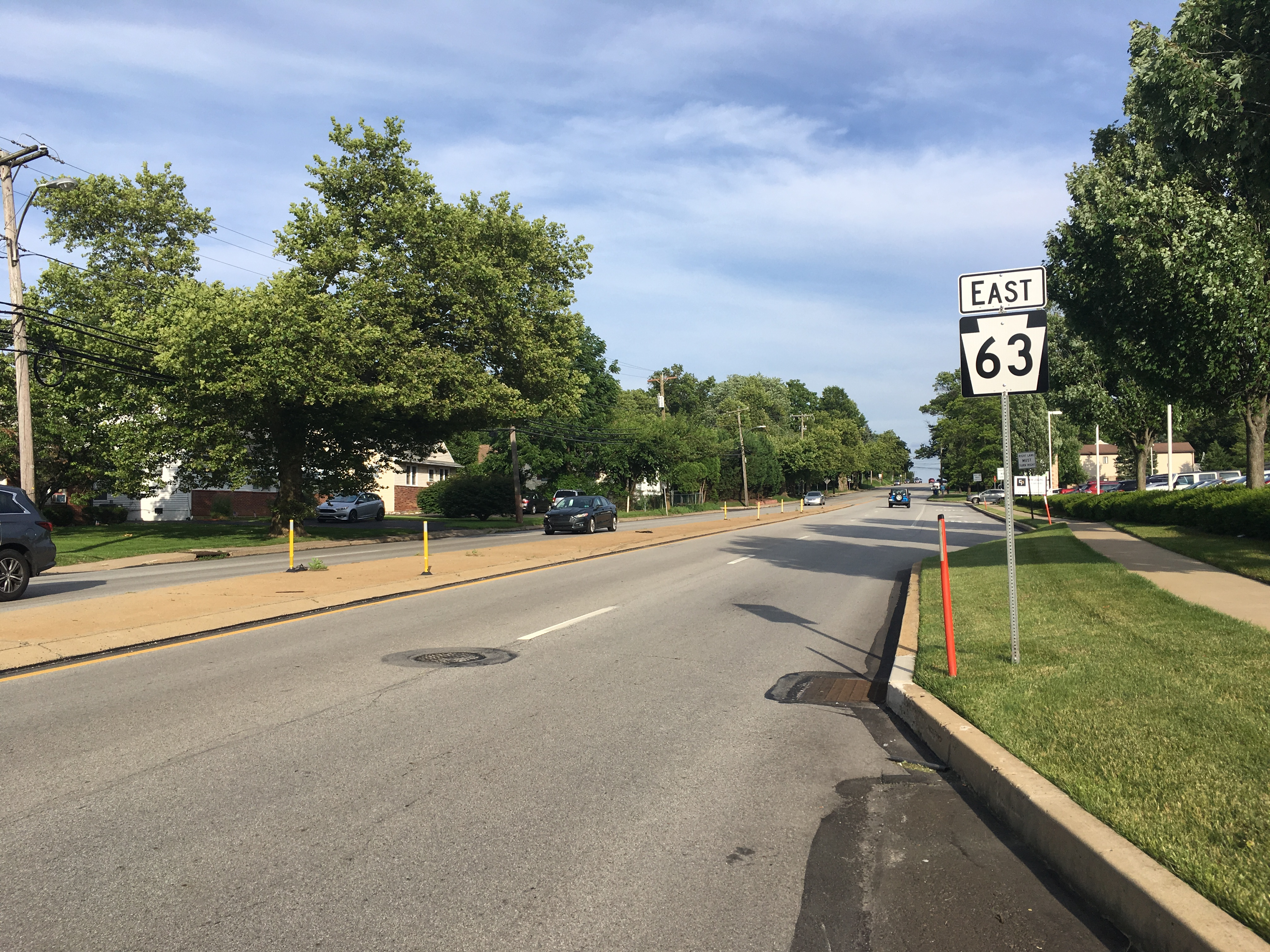
PA 63 eastbound in Willow Grove

Farther southeast, the route turns into a three-lane road with one eastbound lane and two westbound lanes as it passes near a mix of business parks and residential and commercial development. PA 63 widens to four lanes at Dresher Road, with two lanes in each direction, and soon reaches a junction with Dreshertown Road. The road becomes a five-lane road with a center left-turn lane as it comes to the Blair Mill Road intersection, at which point it forms the border between Upper Moreland Township to the northeast and Upper Dublin Township to the southwest.

PA 63 turns into a four-lane divided highway that soon becomes undivided as it crosses over the Pennsylvania Turnpike (I-276) and Norfolk Southern's Morrisville Line before heading into a mix of residential and commercial areas as a five-lane road again. Upon forming the border between Upper Moreland Township and Abington Township, the road name changes to Moreland Road and it briefly turns into a divided highway at the Fitzwatertown Road intersection. The route heads into the community of Willow Grove as a five-lane road. The road enters business areas, becoming a divided highway again as it passes to the northeast of the Willow Grove Park Mall. PA 63 intersects Easton Road and loses the median at the Davisville Road junction before crossing SEPTA's Warminster Line at-grade. The route passes a mix of homes and businesses as it comes to an intersection with PA 611 (Old York Road).

At this point, PA 63 heads into wooded residential areas as a two-lane road. At the intersection with Edge Hill Road, the route turns southwest onto that road and fully enters Abington Township. Farther southwest, PA 63 makes a turn southeast onto Old Welsh Road. The road curves to the east and crosses into Lower Moreland Township. The road becomes Welsh Road again and widens to four lanes as it enters a mix of residential and commercial establishments in the community of Huntingdon Valley, crossing the Pennypack Trail at the Terwood Road intersection and the Pennypack Creek. At the junction with Carson Terrace/Walton Road, there is a westbound jughandle for right turns and U-turns. Upon intersecting PA 232 (Huntingdon Pike) in the community of Bethayres, the route becomes Philmont Avenue and narrows back to two lanes. PA 63 turns south-southeast onto Red Lion Road and crosses SEPTA's West Trenton Line at-grade as it continues through wooded residential subdivisions, making a curve to the southeast and intersecting Pine Road before heading into the city of Philadelphia in Philadelphia County.

=== Philadelphia to Bensalem ===
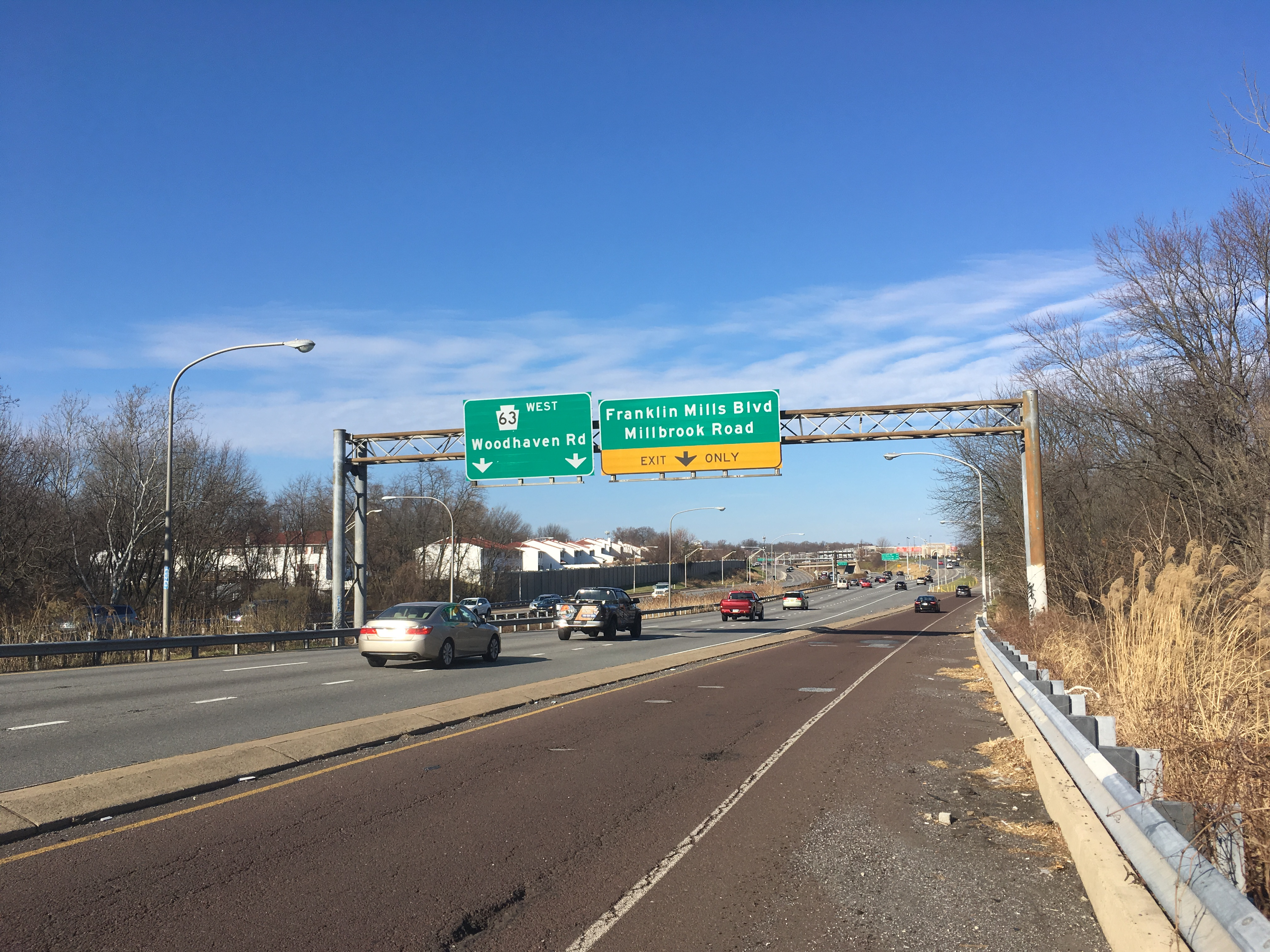
PA 63 westbound on Woodhaven Road at the Franklin Mills Boulevard/Millbrook Road exit in Northeast Philadelphia

PA 63 enters the Northeast Philadelphia section of the city a short distance past the Pine Road intersection. PA 63 widens into a four-lane divided highway and passes between a former golf course (site of the former Budd Company Red Lion plant) to the north and homes and industrial developments to the south. The road continues through a mix of residential and commercial development as it crosses Verree Road and PA 532 (Bustleton Avenue). East of PA 532, the route passes over CSX's Trenton Subdivision railroad line and comes to an intersection with US 1 (Roosevelt Boulevard).

PA 63 turns northeast and forms a concurrency with US 1 on Roosevelt Boulevard, a wide boulevard with local-express lanes. The road carries a 3-3-3-3 lane configuration as it heads northeast through areas of businesses and industrial parks. After intersecting Byberry Road, the concurrency with US 1 ends at an unfinished cloverleaf interchange with Woodhaven Road, where PA 63 heads southeast onto the Woodhaven Road freeway. Woodhaven Road continues northwest of US 1 as an unsigned quadrant route numbered State Route 1022 to an intersection with Evans Street, which connects to Byberry Road, before coming to a dead end at an entrance to an industrial park.

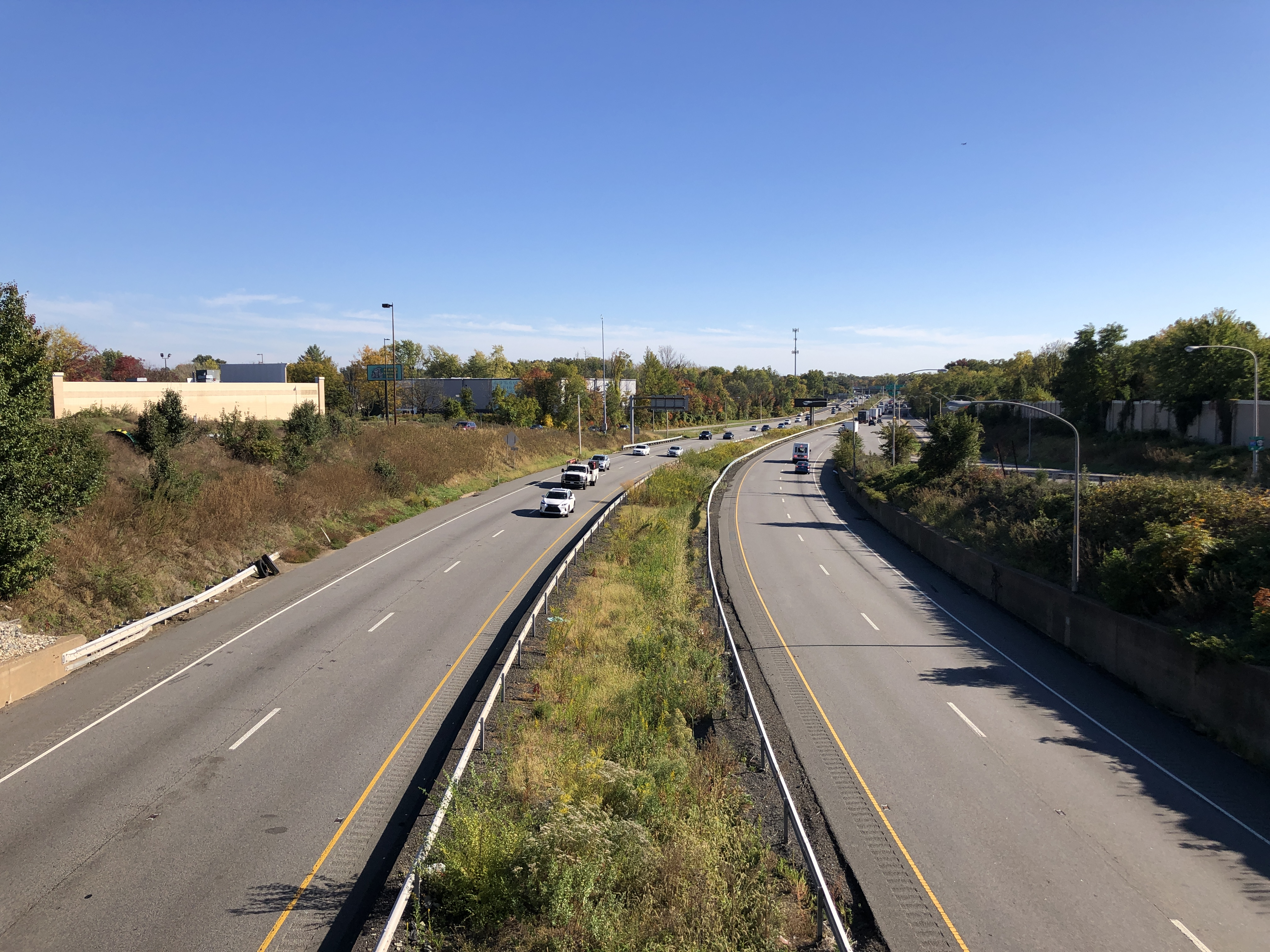
PA 63 eastbound on Woodhaven Road at Millbrook Road in Northeast Philadelphia

Woodhaven Road, a six-lane freeway lined with frontage roads that have the same name, carries the route southeast between an industrial park to the northeast and residential neighborhoods to the southwest as it crosses Byberry Creek and comes to the Thornton Road interchange. Past here, the freeway passes residential areas on both sides and has a westbound exit for Academy Road and a full interchange with Knights Road. At this point, the surroundings along PA 63 become commercial as it comes to the Franklin Mills Boulevard/Millbrook Road interchange that provides access to the Franklin Mall located to the northeast of the road. Within the interchange, the road is temporarily four lanes wide. The frontage roads end past that interchange as Woodhaven Road turns south to cross Poquessing Creek, where it heads into Bensalem Township in Bucks County. Upon entering Bucks County, the route has a partial cloverleaf interchange with US 13 (Bristol Pike). A short distance south of US 13, PA 63 ends at a trumpet interchange with I-95. This interchange also has access to the park and ride lot at the Cornwells Heights station on Amtrak's Northeast Corridor and SEPTA's Trenton Line.

In 2015, PA 63 had an annual average daily traffic count ranging from a high of 65,000 vehicles between Knights Road and I-95 to a low of 10,000 vehicles between PA 309 and PA 152. The entire length of PA 63 is part of the National Highway System.

== History ==
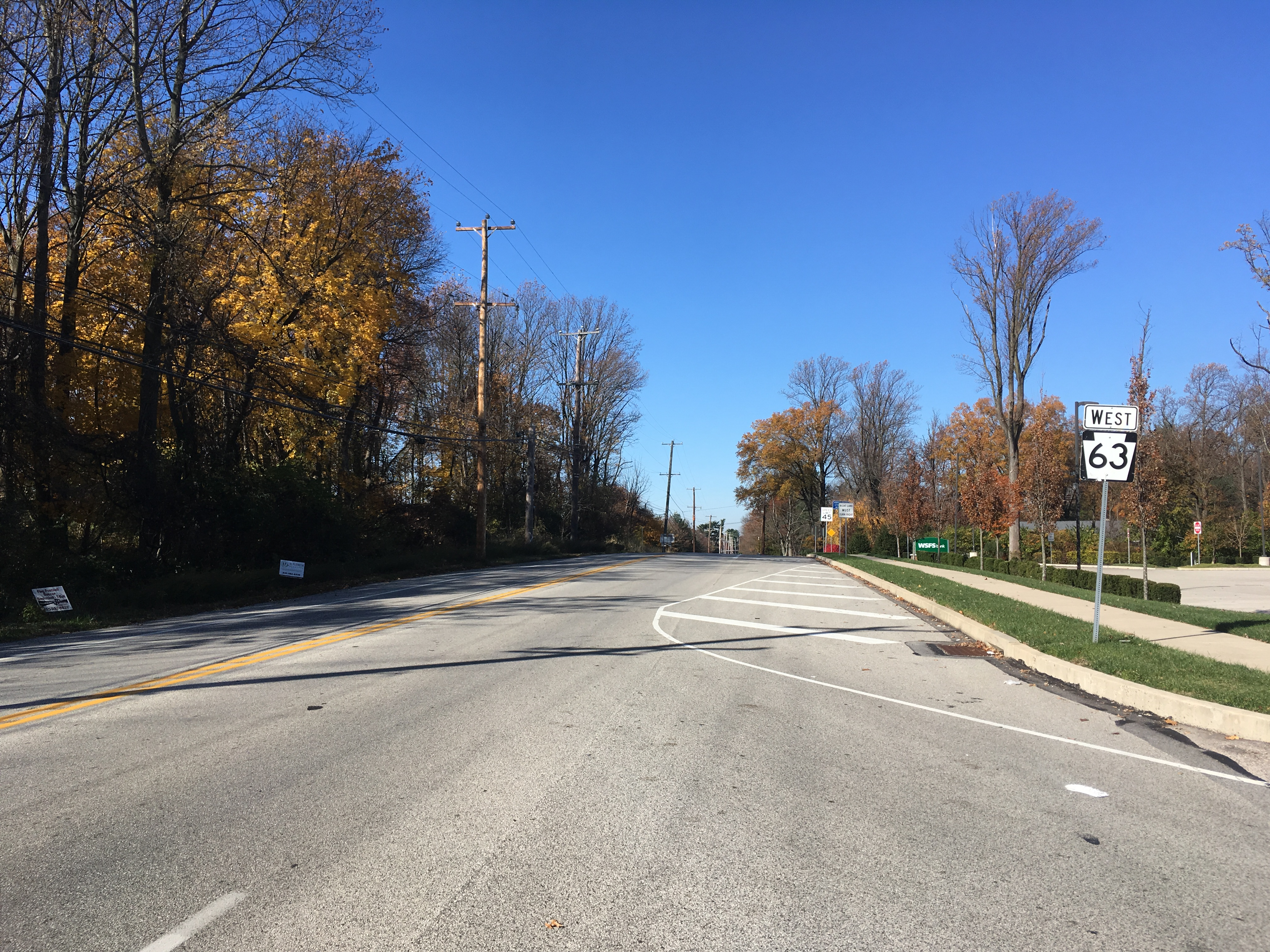
PA 63 westbound past PA 152 in Maple Glen

In 1911, what would become PA 63 was designated as Legislative Route 198 between Green Lane and Philadelphia. By 1927, PA 63 was designated to run from PA 29 in Green Lane to US 611 (now PA 611) in Willow Grove, following its current alignment. PA 63 was extended east to PA 532 in Philadelphia in 1928, following its current alignment between US 611 and Edge Hill Road in Willow Grove. From this intersection, the road followed Edge Hill Road and Terwood Road east before following Welsh Road to an intersection with PA 163/PA 232 in Bethayres and following Philmont Avenue between PA 163/PA 232 and PA 532.

By 1930, PA 63 had seven auxiliary routes: PA 163, PA 263, PA 363, PA 463, PA 563, PA 663, and PA 763. PA 63 was moved to its current alignment between Willow Grove and Bethayres by 1940, with the former alignment of the route between these two points becoming a rerouted PA 163. Also by this time, PA 63 was rerouted to follow Byberry Road between Philmont Avenue and PA 532. By 1950, the PA 163 designation was removed from Edge Hill Road and Terwood Road.

In 1954, the Philadelphia City Planning Commission planned a freeway named Woodhaven Road to run from I-95 in Bensalem Township northwest to Lower Moreland Township, passing through Northeast Philadelphia. Construction on Woodhaven Road began in 1962 with completion between I-95 and US 13 in 1963 and northwest past US 1 to Evans Street in 1966. Following the completion of the freeway, PA 63 was extended east onto it. By 1983, PA 63 was rerouted to use Red Lion Road and US 1 between Philmont Avenue and Woodhaven Road instead of Byberry Road.

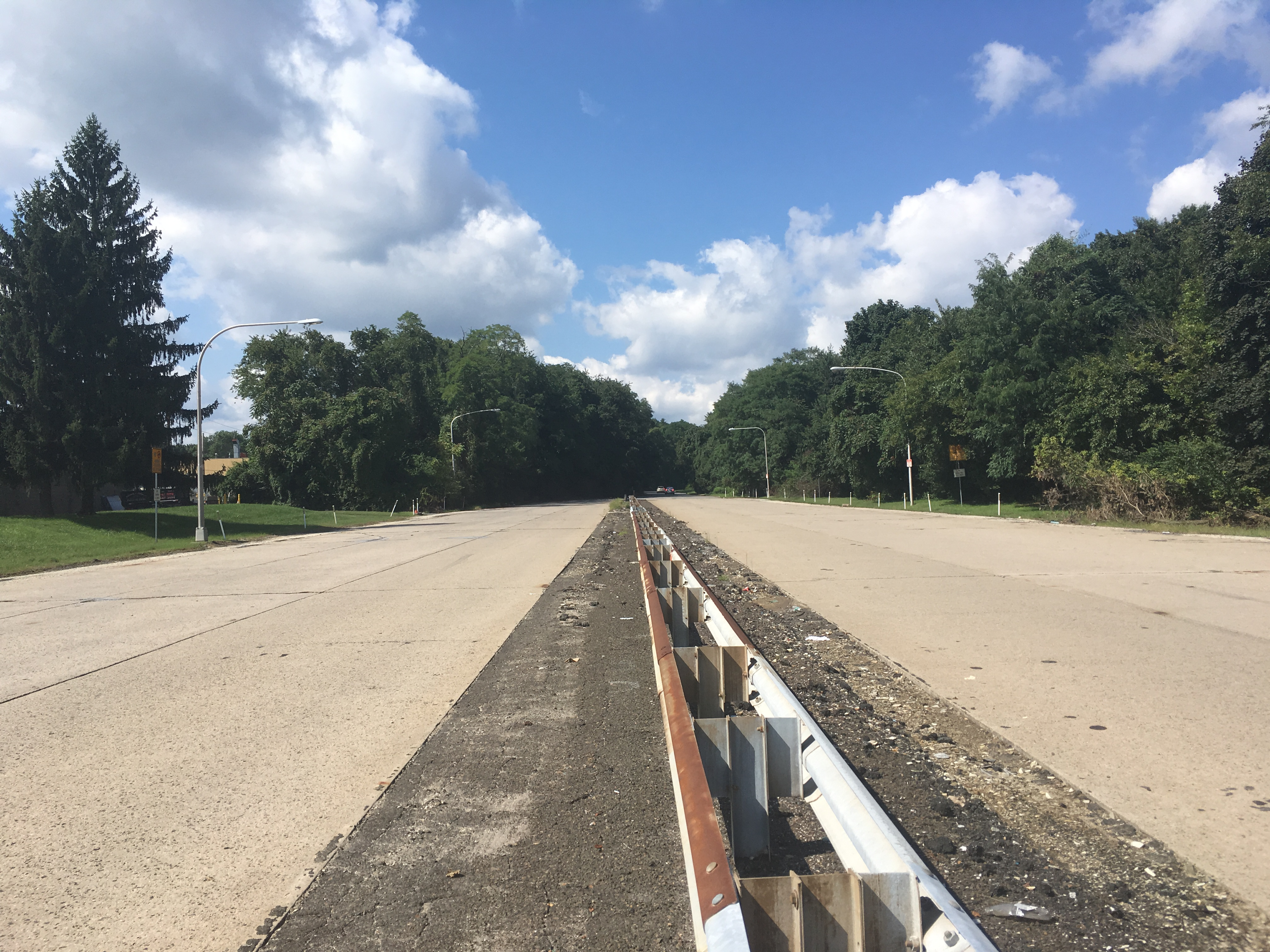
Stub end of the Woodhaven Road freeway west of the US 1 interchange in Northeast Philadelphia

The PA 63 freeway was at one time proposed to continue northwest from Northeast Philadelphia to the Pennsylvania Turnpike (I-276) in Southampton. From here, the freeway would become known as the Cross County Expressway and serve the PA 611 corridor, utilizing the Doylestown Bypass as it continued north to the south end of the PA 33 freeway near Easton. The freeway south of the Pennsylvania Turnpike was planned to cost $68 million and be finished by 1975 while the part north of there was planned to be completed by 1985. However, this freeway was never built. Meanwhile, plans still existed to extend Woodhaven Road from Evans Street to the Montgomery County border at Philmont Avenue. This extension had been approved by the Federal Highway Administration in 1968 and the Pennsylvania Department of Transportation (PennDOT) had torn down 28 homes in the Somerton neighborhood in order to build the road. The Woodhaven Road extension was cancelled in the late 1970s due to funding issues and opposition from Lower Moreland Township residents who did not want to see increased congestion from the extension.

In 1988, the Woodhaven Road extension resurfaced as a means to relieve traffic along Byberry Road. This proposed extension was to continue west only to PA 532 (Bustleton Avenue). However, Lower Moreland Township officials again voiced their opposition that the extension would increase traffic on area roads. In addition, residents in the Westwood development blocked the proposed road. PennDOT removed the Woodhaven Road extension from its long-range plans in 1996.

Despite this, plans for extending Woodhaven Road resurfaced in 2001 when local officials began discussing the extension with PennDOT. Various options for the extension were created, including extending the freeway as far as Philmont Avenue and possibly PA 232 (Huntingdon Pike) as well as widening and improving adjacent roads including PA 532 (Bustleton Avenue) and Byberry Road. In addition, the project also calls for replacing the weight-restricted Byberry Road bridge over a CSX rail line.

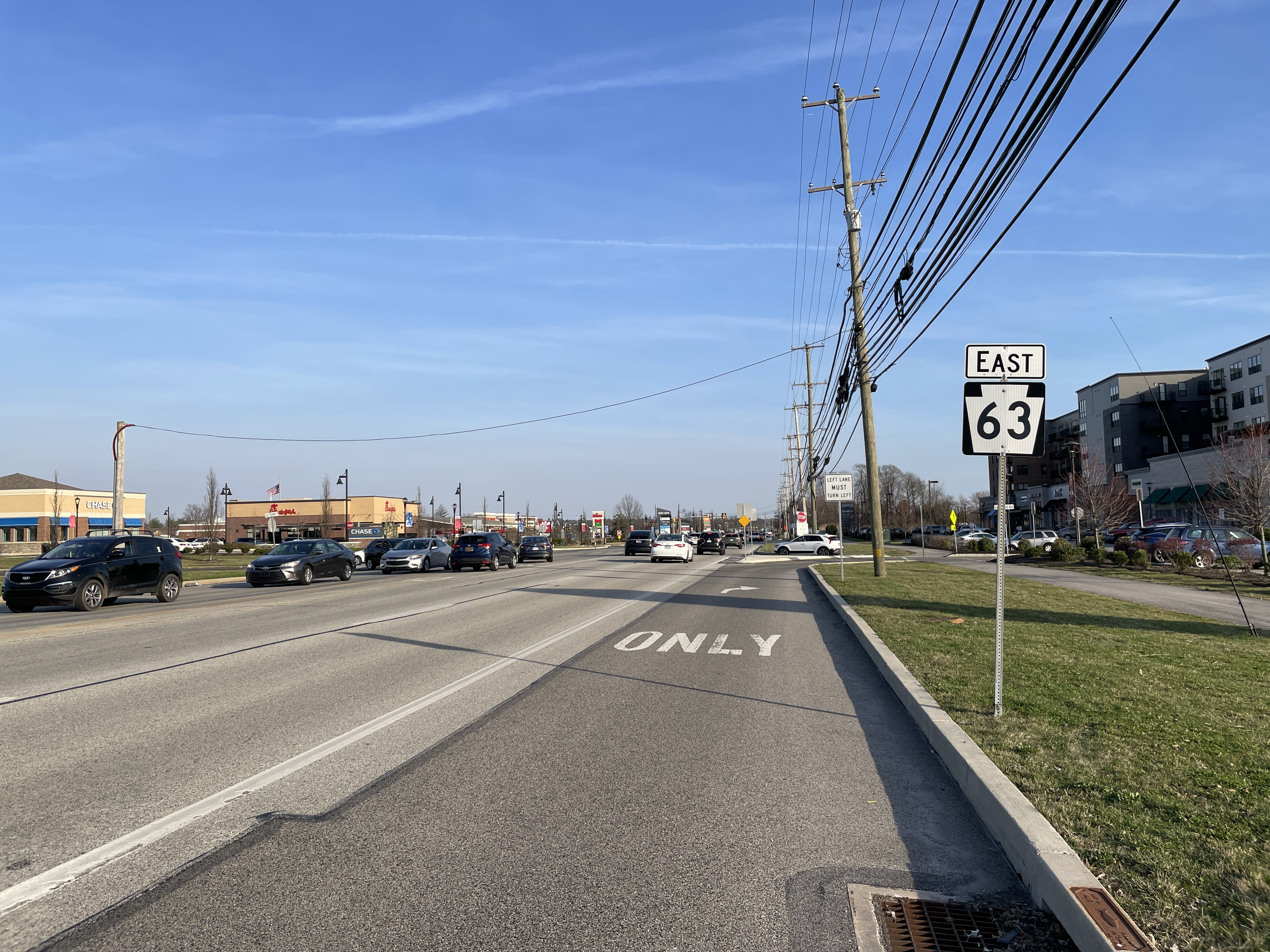
PA 63 eastbound on the Horsham-Upper Dublin township line

After putting the Woodhaven Road project on hold due to budget issues, PennDOT brought it back again as a parkway that is to continue west to PA 532, with an estimated cost of $30 million. Under this proposal, the railroad bridge is to be replaced, with Byberry Road terminating at cul-de-sacs on both sides. The current Woodhaven Road extension plan continues to face opposition from area residents who fear increased traffic.

In June 2011, the portion of PA 63 in Mainland between Freed Road and Old Forty Foot Road was shifted to a new alignment to the northeast, with the old alignment becoming Mainland Road. The Pennsylvania Turnpike Commission constructed two new E-ZPass-only ramps at the Lansdale interchange between I-476 (Pennsylvania Turnpike Northeast Extension) and PA 63 in order to relieve congestion at the toll plaza. This new northbound exit ramp opened December 4, 2016, and the companion southbound on-ramp opened a week later. There are plans to construct an interchange between the Pennsylvania Turnpike (I-276) and PA 63 near Willow Grove.

== Major intersections ==
County	Location	mi	km	Destinations	Notes
Montgomery	Green Lane	0.000	0.000	PA 29 (Gravel Pike) – Schwenksville, Red Hill	Western terminus
Montgomery	Upper Salford Township	2.000	3.219	PA 563 north	Southern terminus of PA 563
Montgomery	Lower Salford Township	5.809	9.349	PA 113 (Harleysville Pike) – Souderton, Skippack	
Montgomery	Towamencin Township	9.617	15.477	I-476 Toll / Penna Turnpike NE Extension – Philadelphia	Exits 31A-B (Lansdale) on I-476 / Penna Turnpike NE Extension
Montgomery	Towamencin–Hatfield township line	11.510	18.524	PA 463 east (Forty Foot Road) – Hatfield	Western terminus of PA 463
Montgomery	Lansdale	13.142	21.150	PA 363 south (Valley Forge Road) – North Wales, Norristown, Valley Forge	Northern terminus of PA 363
Montgomery	Upper Gwynedd–Montgomery township line	16.311	26.250	US 202 Bus. (Dekalb Pike) to US 202 south – Montgomeryville, Norristown	
Montgomery	Upper Gwynedd–Montgomery township line	16.477	26.517	US 202 – Doylestown, Norristown	
Montgomery	Lower Gwynedd–Horsham township line	17.894	28.798	PA 309 (Bethlehem Pike) – Montgomeryville, Philadelphia	
Montgomery	Upper Dublin–Horsham township line	20.692	33.301	PA 152 (Limekiln Pike) – Chalfont, Philadelphia	
Montgomery	Abington–Upper Moreland township line	25.420	40.910	PA 611 (Old York Road)	
Montgomery	Lower Moreland Township	29.296	47.147	PA 232 (Huntingdon Pike) – Bryn Athyn, Meadowbrook	
Philadelphia	Philadelphia	31.854	51.264	PA 532 (Bustleton Avenue)	
Philadelphia	Philadelphia	32.744	52.696	US 1 south (Roosevelt Boulevard) – Philadelphia	Western end of US 1 concurrency
Philadelphia	Philadelphia	34.084	54.853	Western end of freeway section	
Philadelphia	Philadelphia	34.084	54.853	US 1 north – Morrisville	Eastern end of US 1 concurrency
Philadelphia	Philadelphia	34.909	56.181	Thornton Road	
Philadelphia	Philadelphia	35.429	57.017	Academy Road	Westbound exit only
Philadelphia	Philadelphia	36.073	58.054	Knights Road	No eastbound entrance
Philadelphia	Philadelphia	36.500	58.741	Franklin Mills Boulevard / Millbrook Road	No westbound entrance
Bucks	Bensalem Township	37.174	59.826	US 13 (Bristol Pike)	
Bucks	Bensalem Township	37.417	60.217	I-95 – New York, Central Philadelphia, Cornwells Heights Park & Ride	Eastern terminus; exit 35 on I-95
1.000 mi = 1.609 km; 1.000 km = 0.621 mi: Concurrency terminus; Electronic toll collection; Incomplete access

== PA 63 Alternate Truck ==
PA Route 63 Alternate Truck
- Location: Montgomery County, Pennsylvania
- Length: 12.0 mi (19.3 km)
- Existed: 2013–2019

Pennsylvania Route 63 Alternate Truck was a truck route around a weight-restricted bridge over the Unami Creek in Marlborough Township, on which trucks over 30 tons and combination loads over 40 tons were prohibited. The route followed PA 29, Park Avenue, Schwenksville Road, and Old Skippack Road. It was signed in 2013; however, the bridge was completely reconstructed in 2019, and the route was removed.

== Related routes ==
- PA 163 was a route designated between 1930 and 1940 to connect PA 73 in Philadelphia to PA 63/PA 232 in Bethayres. Between 1940 and 1950, the route was redesignated to connect Willow Grove to Bethayres along Edge Hill Road and Terwood Road.
- PA 263 is a route that connects PA 611 in Willow Grove to PA 32 in Centre Bridge.
- PA 363 is a route that connects US 422 in Audubon to PA 63 in Lansdale.
- PA 463 is a route that connects PA 63 in Hatfield Township to PA 611 in Horsham.
- PA 563 is a route that connects PA 63 in Upper Salford Township to PA 412 in Nockamixon Township.
- PA 663 is a route that connects PA 100 in Pottstown to PA 309/PA 313 in Quakertown.
- PA 763 was a route that connected PA 263 in Hatboro to PA 232 in Lower Moreland Township, following Byberry Road. It was created by 1930 with the designation removed by 1940.
