= Churchville Reservoir =

- Location within Pennsylvania Location within the United States
- Location: Bucks County, Pennsylvania, US
- Coordinates: 40.1835027°N 74.9973444°W
- Type: reservoir
- Primary inflows: Mill Creek
- First flooded: 1942
- Surface area: 180 acres (73 ha)

Churchville reservoir is a man-made freshwater reservoir located in Bucks County, Pennsylvania. It was created by damming the Mill Creek in 1942 to act as a reserve of municipal water.

The reservoir is currently owned by Aqua Pennsylvania and acts as a reserve of water. Fishing is banned in the reservoir.

The Churchville Nature Center is located adjacent to the reservoir on Churchville Lane. The reservoir spans 180 acres, and along with the township and nature center, the total area reaches 670 acres.

Elm Avenue and Churchville Lane cross over the reservoir.

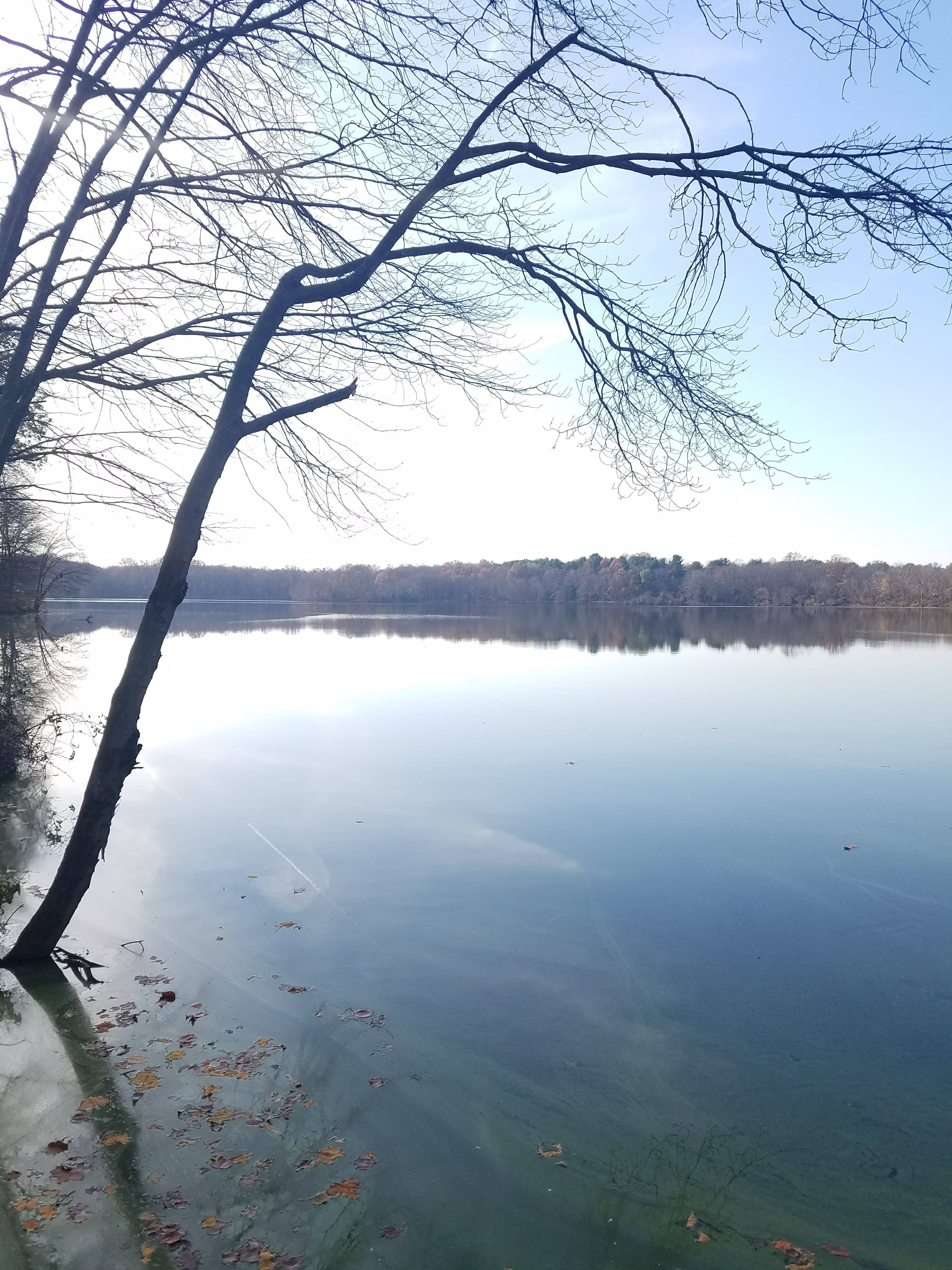
Churchville Reservoir in mid-November

== History ==
The reservoir was created in 1942 by the Springfield water company to act as a reserve of water . In times of low water it could be emptied through Iron Works Creek and from there into Mill Creek, which eventually empties into the Neshaminy Creek. Once the water reaches the Neshaminy, it can be withdrawn through the pumping station at Neshaminy Falls.

When the reservoir was created it was surrounded by a rural land and few houses. By the late 1950s land development had expanded and new residents began to move to the Churchville area.

The Department of Parks had also been created to provide land for use of both humans and wildlife. The Churchville Nature center was one of the first locations selected due to its diversity of habitat including a woodlot, open field, meadow-land, and the reservoir.
