= Northampton Township, Bucks County, Pennsylvania =

Township in Pennsylvania, US

Northampton Township
- Township
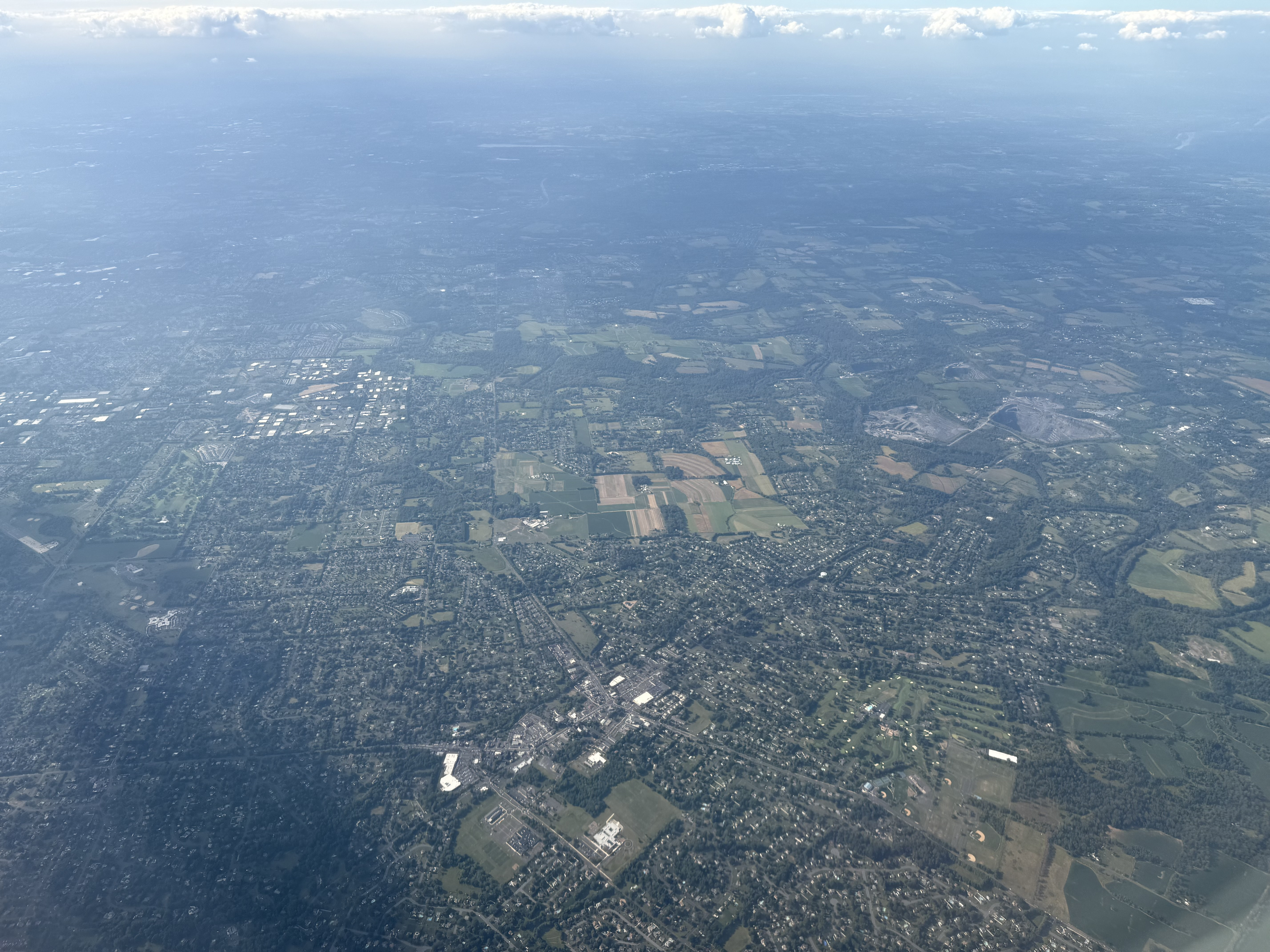
- Aerial view of the township

- Flag Seal

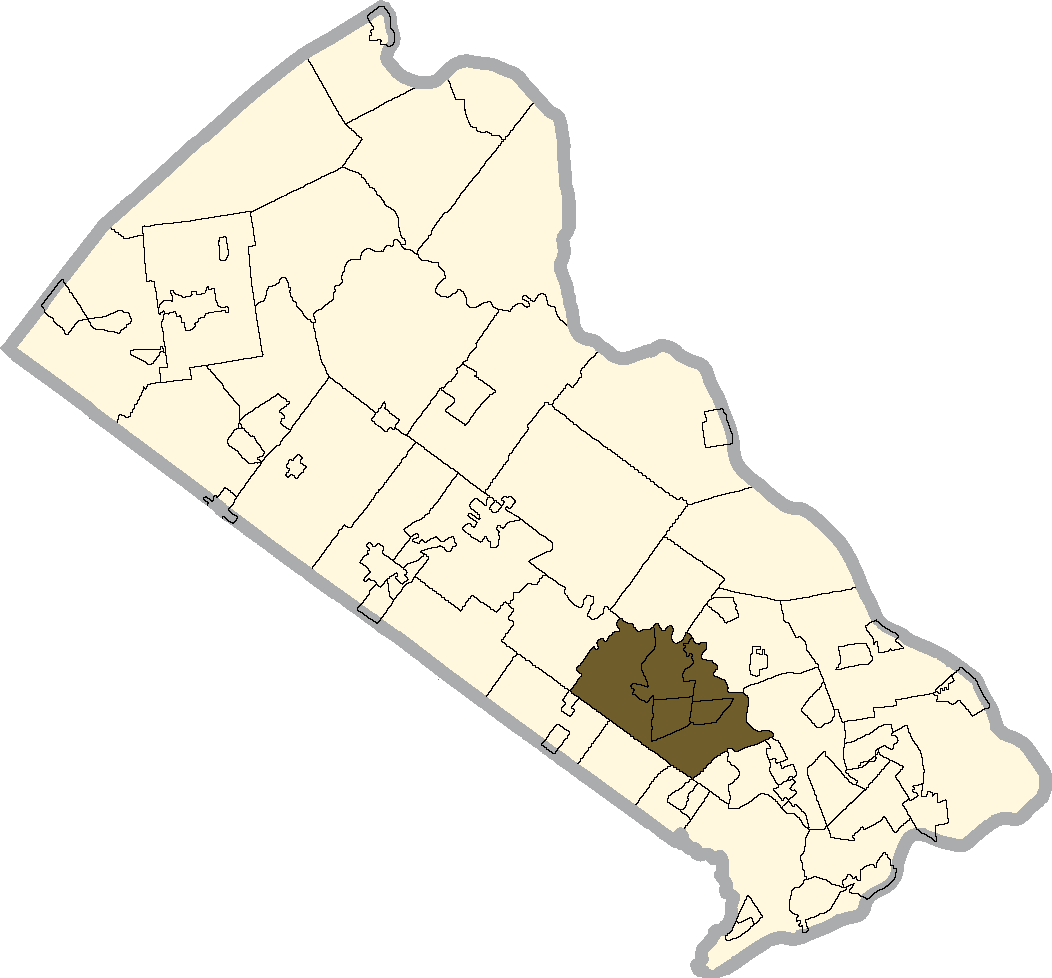
- Location of Northampton Township in Bucks County

- Location in Pennsylvania and the United States Northampton Township (the United States)
- Coordinates: 40°12′04″N 75°00′01″W
- Country: United States
- State: Pennsylvania
- County: Bucks
- Established: December 14, 1722

Area
  - Total: 26.12 sq mi (67.7 km^{2})
  - Land: 25.68 sq mi (66.5 km^{2})
  - Water: 0.44 sq mi (1.1 km^{2})
- Elevation: 223 ft (68 m)

Population (2020)
  - Total: 39,915
  - Density: 1,554/sq mi (600.1/km^{2})
- Time zone: UTC-5 (EST)
  - Summer (DST): UTC-4 (EDT)
- Area codes: 215, 267, and 445
- FIPS code: 42-017-54688
- Website: www.northamptontownship.com

Northampton Township is a township in Bucks County, Pennsylvania, United States. The township is located approximately 12 miles northeast of Philadelphia. The population was 39,915 at the 2020 census.

== History ==
Northampton Township was originally settled by English colonists who came with William Penn on his voyage to Pennsylvania. They named it after Northampton, the county town of Northamptonshire, England. Northampton Township was incorporated in 1722.

== Geography ==
According to the U.S. Census Bureau, the township has a total area of 26.1 square miles (67.6 km^{2}), of which 25.8 square miles (66.9 km^{2}) is land and 0.3 square mile (0.7 km^{2}) (1.07%) is water. It is drained by the Neshaminy Creek, which forms its entire northeastern boundary, into the Delaware River.

The township is made up of the following unincorporated communities and census-designated places:

- Churchville
- Holland
- Ivyland
- Richboro
- Village Shires

Other past and present place names include Bulltown, Chain Bridge, Cornell, Grenoble, Jacksonville, Rush Valley, Saint Leonard, Spring Garden, and White House. Natural features include Broad Axe Creek, Edge Hill, Iron Works Creek, Little Neshaminy Creek, Pine Run, Slack Creek, and Dot Creek

== Climate ==
According to the Köppen climate classification system, Northampton Township, Pennsylvania has a hot-summer, wet all year, humid continental climate (Dfa). Dfa climates are characterized by at least one month having an average mean temperature ≤ 32.0 °F (≤ 0.0 °C), at least four months with an average mean temperature ≥ 50.0 °F (≥ 10.0 °C), at least one month with an average mean temperature ≥ 71.6 °F (≥ 22.0 °C), and no significant precipitation difference between seasons.

During the summer months, episodes of extreme heat and humidity can occur with heat index values ≥ 100 °F (≥ 38 °C). On average, the wettest month of the year is July which corresponds with the annual peak in thunderstorm activity. During the winter months, episodes of extreme cold and wind can occur with wind chill values < 0 °F (< -18 °C). The plant hardiness zone is 7a with an average annual extreme minimum air temperature of 0.3 °F (−17.6 °C). The average seasonal (Nov-Apr) snowfall total is between 24 and 30 inches (61 and 76 centimetres), and the average snowiest month is February which corresponds with the annual peak in nor'easter activity.

Climate data for Northampton Township, Bucks County, Pennsylvania (1981 – 2010 averages)
Month	Jan	Feb	Mar	Apr	May	Jun	Jul	Aug	Sep	Oct	Nov	Dec	Year
Mean daily maximum °F (°C)	39.7 (4.3)	42.9 (6.1)	51.1 (10.6)	63.0 (17.2)	72.5 (22.5)	81.7 (27.6)	85.9 (29.9)	84.2 (29.0)	77.4 (25.2)	66.1 (18.9)	55.2 (12.9)	44.0 (6.7)	63.7 (17.6)
Daily mean °F (°C)	31.5 (−0.3)	34.1 (1.2)	41.6 (5.3)	52.3 (11.3)	61.7 (16.5)	71.2 (21.8)	75.8 (24.3)	74.3 (23.5)	67.1 (19.5)	55.4 (13.0)	45.8 (7.7)	35.9 (2.2)	54.0 (12.2)
Mean daily minimum °F (°C)	23.2 (−4.9)	25.3 (−3.7)	32.1 (0.1)	41.6 (5.3)	50.9 (10.5)	60.7 (15.9)	65.6 (18.7)	64.3 (17.9)	56.8 (13.8)	44.7 (7.1)	36.4 (2.4)	27.9 (−2.3)	44.2 (6.8)
Average precipitation inches (mm)	3.55 (90)	2.75 (70)	4.10 (104)	3.99 (101)	4.34 (110)	4.35 (110)	5.25 (133)	4.42 (112)	4.43 (113)	3.77 (96)	3.66 (93)	4.00 (102)	48.61 (1,235)
Average relative humidity (%)	65.9	62.7	58.4	57.6	62.3	66.3	66.6	69.1	70.0	69.3	67.6	68.4	65.4
Average dew point °F (°C)	21.4 (−5.9)	22.7 (−5.2)	28.1 (−2.2)	37.8 (3.2)	48.7 (9.3)	59.4 (15.2)	63.9 (17.7)	63.5 (17.5)	57.0 (13.9)	45.5 (7.5)	35.7 (2.1)	26.5 (−3.1)	42.6 (5.9)
Source: PRISM Climate Group

== Ecology ==
According to the A. W. Kuchler U.S. potential natural vegetation types, Northampton Township, Pennsylvania would have an Appalachian Oak (104) vegetation type with an Eastern Hardwood Forest (25) vegetation form.

== Government ==
Northampton Township is a class two township under Pennsylvania State Code. It is governed by a five-member Board of Supervisors.

The five Supervisors are:

- Adam M. Selisker (R), Chairman
- Barry Moore (R), Vice Chairman
- Paula Gasper (R), Secretary
- Dr. Kimberly Rose (D), Treasurer
- Robert Salzer (R), Member

== Education ==
Northampton Township is part of the Council Rock School District, which includes Northampton Township, Newtown Township, Newtown Borough, Wrightstown Township and Upper Makefield. Northampton Township is represented on the Council Rock School Board in five single-seat School Director regions:

Board Member	Region	Term Expiration
Yota Palli	8 - Upper Makefield Districts 1 - 4	2021
Bob Hickey	3 - Northampton Township Districts 1, 11, 15	2021
Michael Roosevelt	6 - Northampton Township Districts 4, 8, 13, 18	2021
Ed Salamon	5 - Northampton Township Districts 9, 14, 16	2023
Mariann McKee	1 - Newtown Borough Wards 1, 2; Newtown Township Districts 4 - 6	2023
Kristin Marcell	9 - Wrightstown Township; Newtown Township Districts 1, 2	2021
Edward F. Tate, III	2 - Newtown Township Districts 3, 7, 8	2023
Joseph Hidalgo	4 - Northampton Township Districts 2, 6, 7, 12	2024
Dr. Michael Thorwart	7 - Northampton Township Districts 3, 5, 10, 17	2023

St. Katharine Drexel Regional Catholic School is the local Catholic grade school. In 2012, St. Bede the Venerable School in Holland merged with Assumption B.V.M. Catholic School in Feasterville to form St. Katharine Drexel.

== Demographics ==
Historical population
Census	Pop.	Note	%±
1930	1,375		—
1940	1,734		26.1%
1950	2,248		29.6%
1960	6,006		167.2%
1970	15,807		163.2%
1980	27,392		73.3%
1990	35,406		29.3%
2000	39,384		11.2%
2010	39,726		0.9%
2020	39,915		0.5%

As of the 2010 census, the township was 93.2% Non-Hispanic White, 0.6% Black or African American, 0.1% Native American, 3.4% Asian, and 0.8% were two or more races. 3.5% of the population were of Hispanic or Latino ancestry.

As of the census of 2000, there were 39,384 people, 13,014 households, and 10,957 families residing in the township. The population density was 1,524.7 inhabitants per square mile (588.7/km^{2}). There were 13,138 housing units at an average density of 508.6 units per square mile (196.4 units/km^{2}). The racial makeup of the township was 97.01% White, 0.41% African American, 0.04% Native American, 1.80% Asian, 0.01% Pacific Islander, 0.16% from other races, and 0.58% from two or more races. Hispanic or Latino of any race were 0.83% of the population.

There were 13,014 households, out of which 43.3% had children under the age of 18 living with them, 76.0% were married couples living together, 6.2% had a female householder with no husband present, and 15.8% were non-families. 13.7% of all households were made up of individuals, and 5.8% had someone living alone who was 65 years of age or older. The average household size was 3.01 and the average family size was 3.33.

In the township, the population was spread out, with 28.2% under the age of 18, 6.5% from 18 to 24, 27.2% from 25 to 44, 28.1% from 45 to 64, and 10.0% who were 65 years of age or older. The median age was 39 years. For every 100 females, there were 94.5 males. For every 100 females age 18 and over, there were 91.8 males.

The median income for a household in the township was $82,655, and the median income for a family was $91,477. Males had a median income of $60,368 versus $38,969 for females. The per capita income for the township was $33,028. About 1.4% of families and 1.8% of the population were below the poverty line, including 1.7% of those under age 18 and 3.6% of those age 65 or over.

== Transportation ==
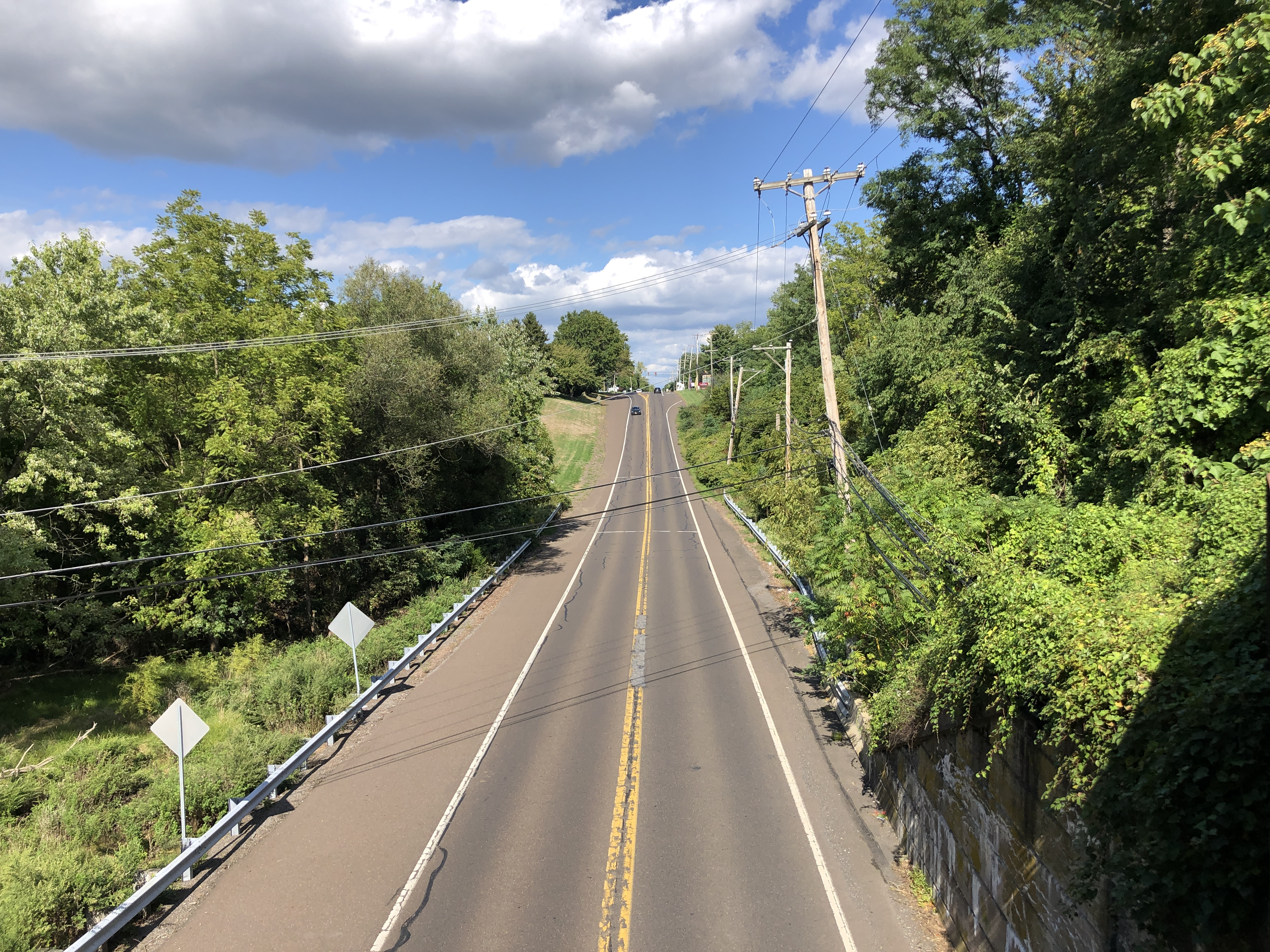
PA 532 northbound in Northampton Township

As of 2018 there were 202.37 miles (325.68 km) of public roads in Northampton Township, of which 30.91 miles (49.74 km) were maintained by the Pennsylvania Department of Transportation (PennDOT) and 171.46 miles (275.94 km) were maintained by the township.

Numbered routes serving Northampton Township include Pennsylvania Route 213, which runs northeast–southwest along the southeastern border of the township along Bridgetown Pike on its route between Feasterville and Langhorne; Pennsylvania Route 232, which runs north–south through the township along Second Street Pike on its route between Southampton and Wrightstown Township; Pennsylvania Route 332, which runs east–west through the township along Jacksonville Road, Almshouse Road, and Newtown Richboro Road on its route between Ivyland and Newtown; and Pennsylvania Route 532, which passes northeast–southwest through the eastern part of the township along Buck Road on its route between Feasterville and Newtown.

Other roads include Bristol Road, which runs northwest–southeast along the southwestern border of the township; Almshouse Road, which begins in Richboro and heads east–west along PA 332 before splitting from PA 332 and continuing west towards Jamison; Bustleton Pike, which runs north–south through the township from Feasterville to its north end at PA 232 in Richboro; and Holland Road, which runs north–south through the eastern portion of the township between PA 532 and PA 332.

TMA Bucks operates the Richboro-Warminster Rushbus, which offers peak-hour shuttles from Richboro and Northampton Township to a connection with SEPTA Regional Rail's Warminster Line and SEPTA City Bus Route 22 at the Warminster station in Warminster Township.

The New Hope Railroad freight and tourist railroad passes through the western portion of the township and Norfolk Southern Railway's Morrisville Line freight railroad line passes east–west through the southern portion of the township.

The communities of Holland and Churchville had commuter train service until January 1983 via SEPTA's Fox Chase-Newtown Rapid Transit Line. Service was "temporarily" suspended due to failing train equipment resulting in poor ridership. While Churchville Station has been restored, Holland station was demolished in 2000.

In the ensuing years (particularly post-1995), there has been heavy interest in resuming passenger service by Bucks County officials. Several housing booms throughout the 1980s and 1990s have resulted in homes being situated directly adjacent to the dormant rail line. Though there is overwhelming support from a majority of residents looking for better public transportation options, several residents along Old Jordan Road in Holland have voiced NIMBY opposition to the reactivation of regular passenger service.

Though rail service was initially replaced with a Fox Chase-Newtown shuttle bus, patronage remained light. The replacement bus service was far slower and less convenient than the train service it replaced, resulting in the shuttle bus being very unpopular. The travelling public never saw a bus service as a suitable replacement for a rail service.

== Parks and recreation ==
Several parks exist with in Northampton Township. The largest is Tyler State Park, which sits on 1,711 acres of parkland and offers trails for biking, hiking and horse back riding as well as several athletic fields, playgrounds, a disc golf course and canoe rentals. The other two main parks are Churchville Nature Center and the Northampton Township Municipal Park. Churchville Nature Center is one of the three nature centers of the Bucks County Department of Parks and Recreation. It operates out of a large visitor center offering two miles of hiking trails on its 55-acre nature preserve located adjacent to the Churchville Reservoir. Environmental education programs are offered year round at Churchville including programs on native butterflies through the center's Butterfly House, and ones on pre-Columbian Native American culture through its re-created Lenape Village.
