= Point Pleasant Historic District (Point Pleasant, Pennsylvania) =

Historic district in Pennsylvania, United States

- U.S. National Register of Historic Places
- U.S. Historic district
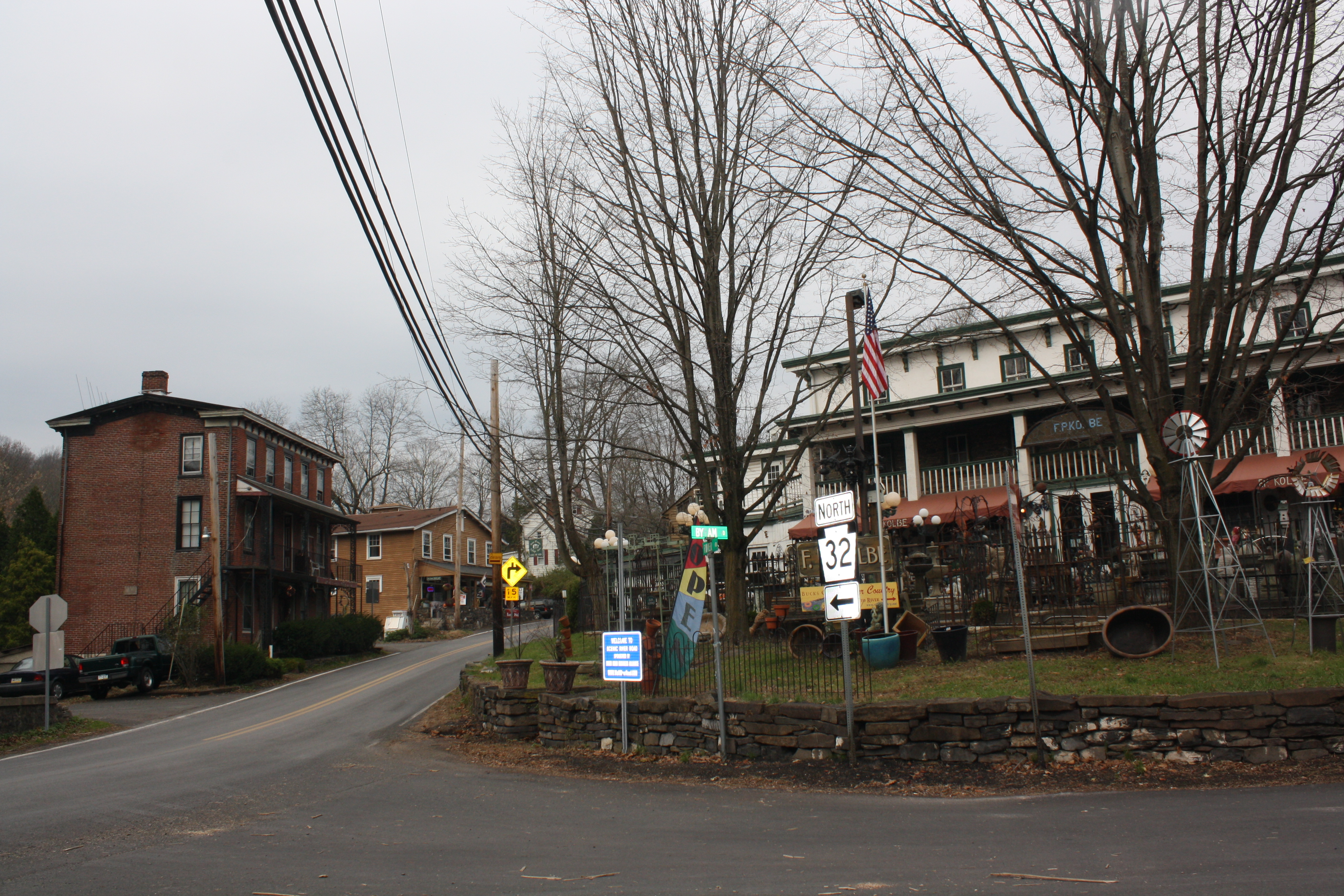
- Point Pleasant Historic District. Corner of River and Byram Rds. November 2012.

- Location within Pennsylvania Location within the United States
- Location: River Rd. and Point Pleasant Pike, Point Pleasant, Plumstead Township and Tinicum Township, Pennsylvania
- Coordinates: 40°25′20″N 75°03′58″W
- Area: 30 acres (12 ha)
- Architectural style: Bungalow/craftsman, Greek Revival, Italianate
- NRHP reference No.: 89001652
- Added to NRHP: October 5, 1989

The Point Pleasant Historic District is a national historic district that is located in Point Pleasant, Plumstead Township and Tinicum Township, Bucks County, Pennsylvania.

It was added to the National Register of Historic Places in 1989.

== History and architectural features ==
This district includes seventy-four contributing buildings and four contributing structures that are located in the riverfront and resort village of Point Pleasant. They include a variety of residential, commercial, and institutional buildings. The buildings are predominantly 2 1/2-story, stone and frame, gable roofed structures that are reflective of vernacular, Greek Revival, Italianate, and Bungalow/craftsman styles.

Notable buildings include "The Brambles," the Thomas Schwartz House (c. 1840), the Stover Mansion (Tattersall Inn), the Point Pleasant School (1850), the Baptist Church (1852), the Point Pleasant Hotel (c. 1840), the Jacob Sutters Hotel (c. 1870), Waterman's Inn (1832), and the Stover Grist and Saw Mill (c. 1742). The contributing structures are four bridges that cross the Delaware Canal.

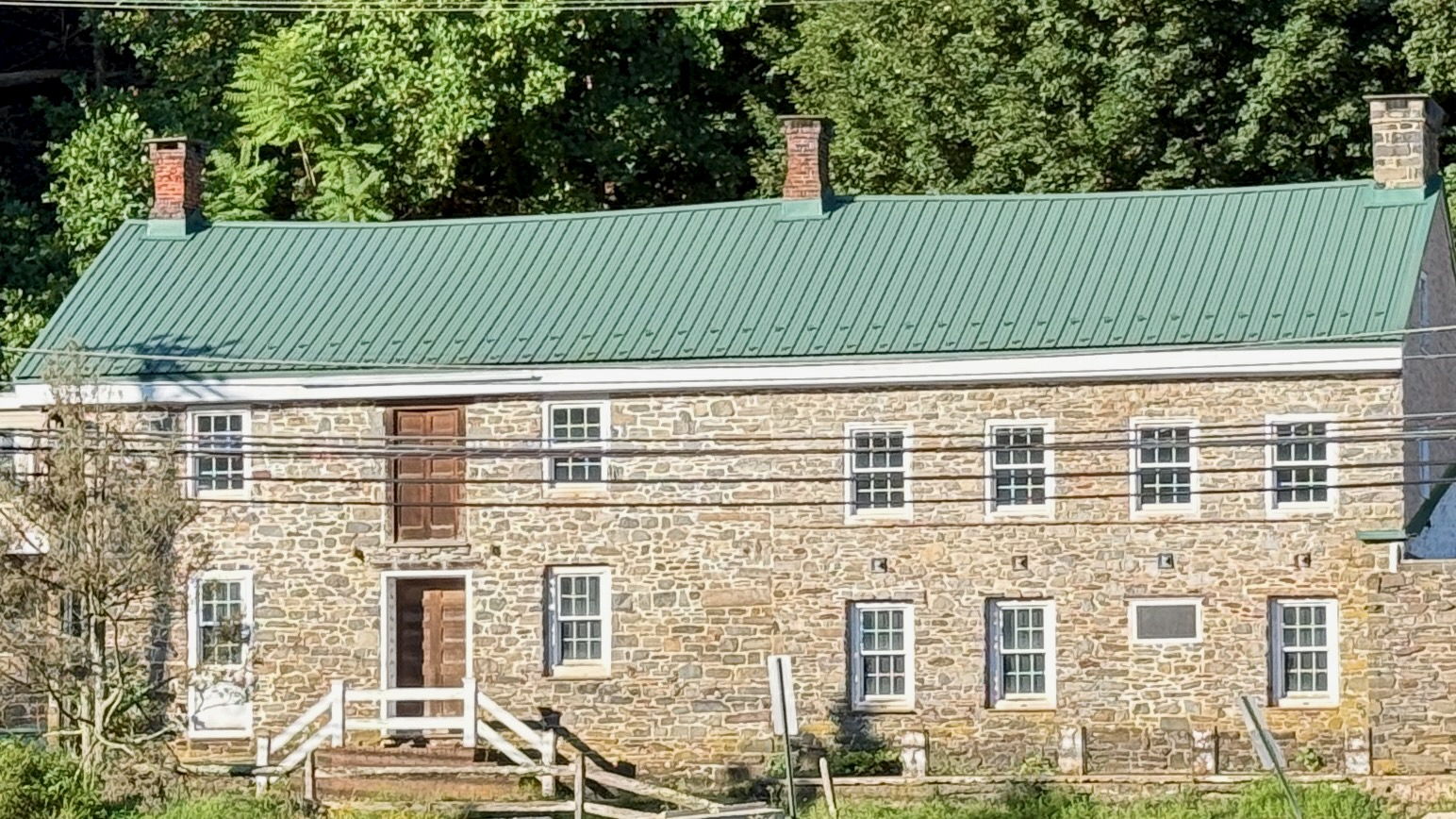
Former Mountainside Inn, by lock 13 and 14 of the Delaware Canal

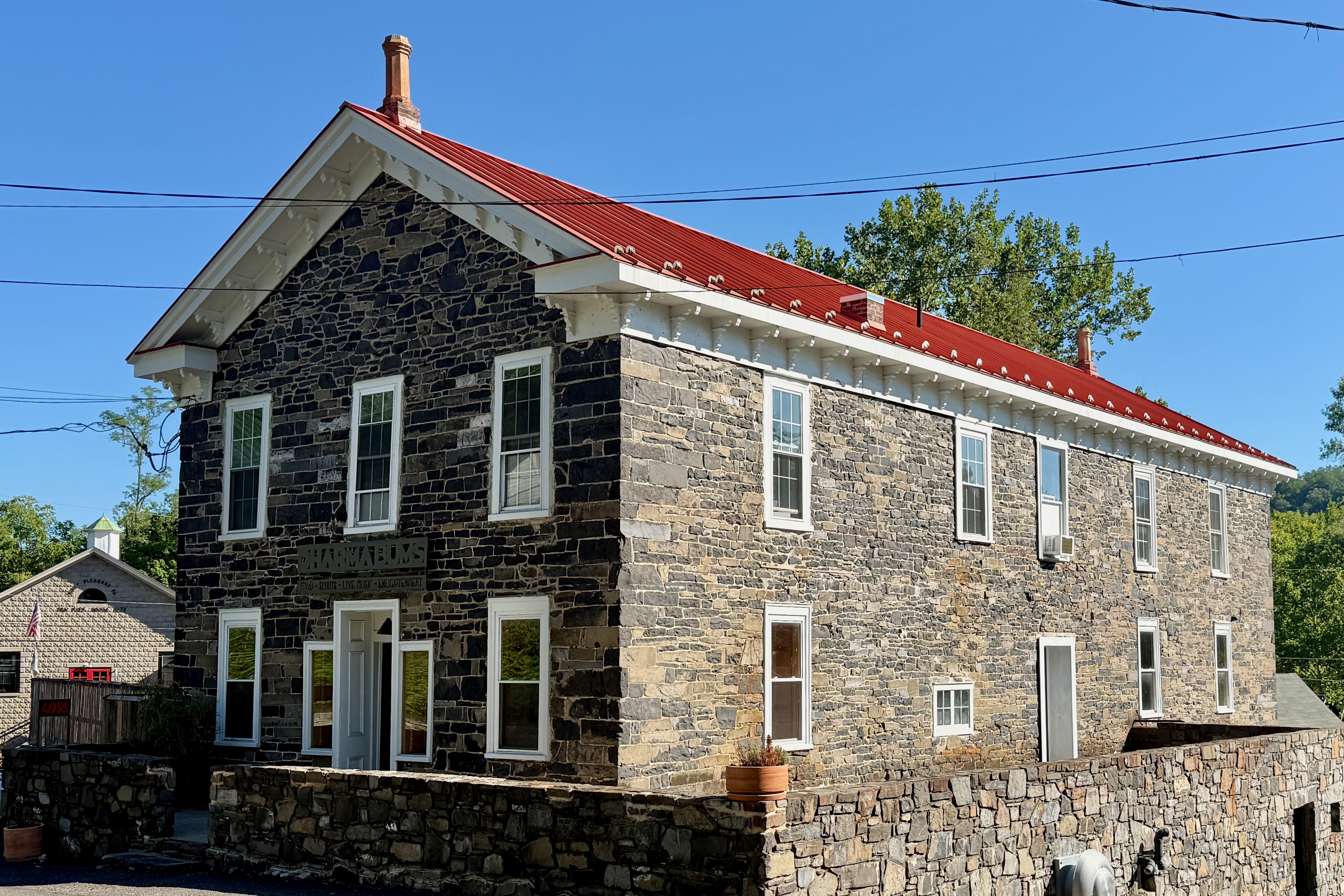
Former Apple Jack's Tavern

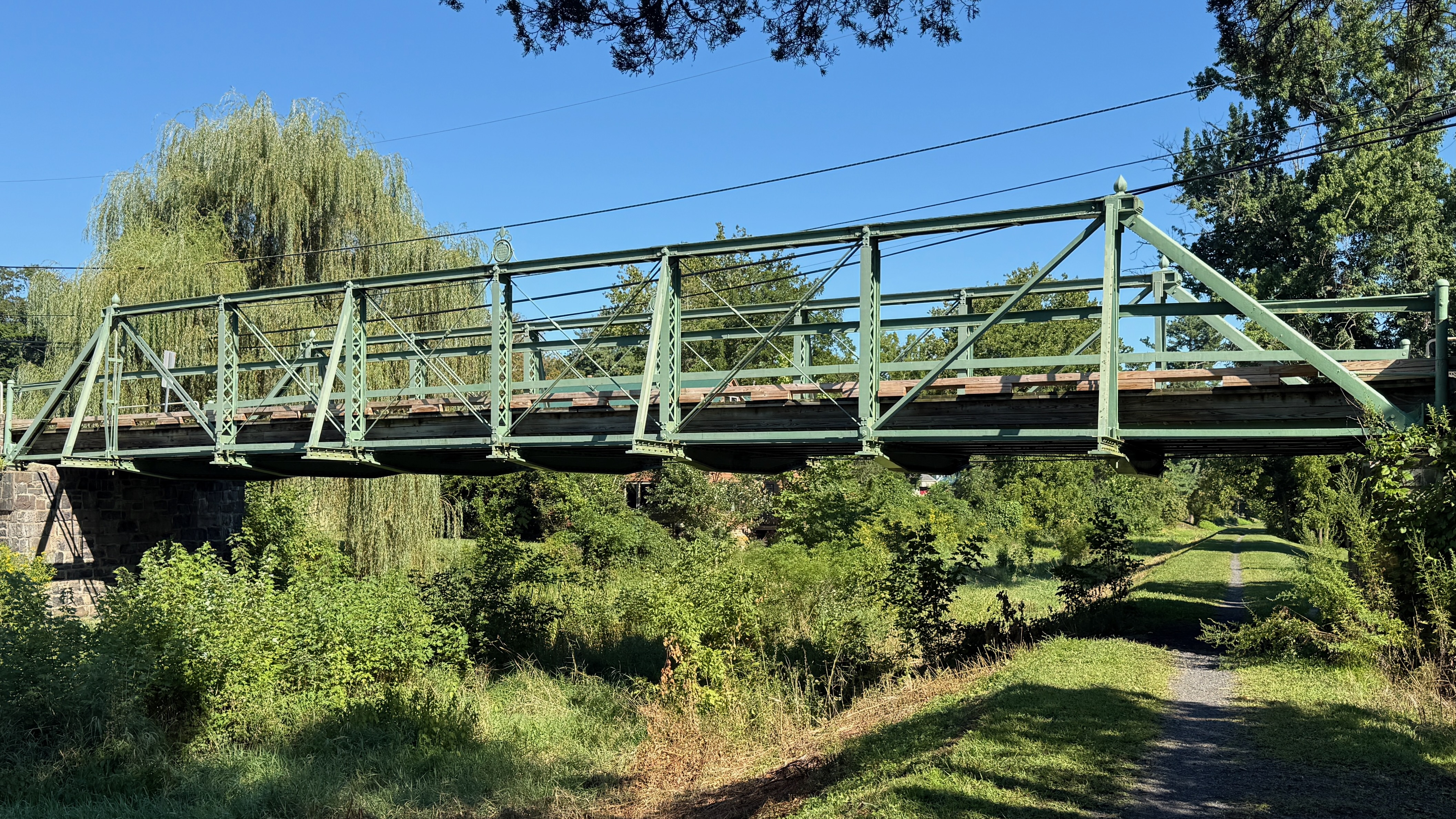
Truss bridge over the Delaware Canal
