= Hickory Creek (Delaware River tributary) =

Hickory Creek Hickory Run
- Hickory Creek

Location
- Country: United States
- State: Pennsylvania
- County: Bucks
- Township: Plumstead

Physical characteristics
- Source
  - coordinates: 40°24′17″N 75°4′26″W
  - elevation: 420 feet (130 m)
- Mouth
  - coordinates: 40°25′11″N 75°3′45″W
  - elevation: 72 feet (22 m)
- Length: 1.17 miles (1.88 km)

Basin features
- Progression: Hickory Creek → Delaware River → Delaware Bay
- River system: Delaware River
- Bridges: Wismer Road; Tollgate Road; Pennsylvania Route 32 (River Road); Pennsylvania Canal (Delaware Division) and towpath
- Slope: 297.44 feet per mile (56.333 m/km)

Hickory Creek is a tributary of the Delaware River in Plumstead Township, Bucks County, Pennsylvania, in the United States.

== History ==
Hickory Creek's name was due to the abundance of hickory trees in the area. It was once regarded as the border between the villages of Point Pleasant and Lower Black Eddy.

== Statistics ==
Hickory Creek is located entirely within Plumstead Township, Pennsylvania. Its GNIS I.D. number is 1176953. Its watershed is 1.50 square miles (3.9 km^{2}), and meets at the Delaware River's 156.98 river mile. It rises at an elevation of 420 feet (130 m) and meets the Delaware at an elevation of 72 feet (22 m), resulting in an average slope of 297.44 feet per mile (56.333 m/km). Its U.S. Geological I.D. number is 3109.

== Course ==
Hickory rises near Tollgate Road, southeast of Ferry Road and flows northeast 1.17 miles (1.88 km) to the Delaware River.

== Geology ==
- Appalachian Highlands Division
  - Piedmont Province
    - Piedmont Lowland Section
      - Diabase

Hickory Creek lies in a sliver of diabase rock which intruded into the Lockatong Formation of the Piedmont Lowland during the Jurassic and the Triassic, occurring as a sill of dense, dark gray to black and very fine grained, 90-95% labradorite and augite.

== Crossings and Bridges ==
Crossing	NBI Number	Length	Lanes	Spans	Material/Design	Built	Reconstructed	Latitude	Longitude
Wismer Road	-	-	-	-	-	-	-	-	-
Tollgate Road	48538	12 metres (39 ft)	2	2	concrete culvert	1989	-	40°24'21"N	75°4'23"W
Pennsylvania Route 32 (River Road)	-	-	-	-	-	-	-	-	-
Pennsylvania Canal (Delaware Division) and towpath	-	-	-	-	-	-	-	-	-

== See also ==
- List of rivers of the United States
- List of rivers of Pennsylvania
- List of Delaware River tributaries
