= Krieghoff (surname) =

Krieghoff is a surname. Notable people with the surname include:

- Cornelius Krieghoff (1815–1872), Dutch-Canadian painter
- Elise Krieghoff (born 1993), American soccer player.

The surname Krieghoff is the 744,013th most common surname globally, with approximately 387 individuals bearing it. The Krieghoff surname has varying levels of prevalence across different countries. In Germany, it is most common, with 291 individuals bearing the name, ranking 29,145th and occurring at a frequency of 1 in every 276,651 people. In the United States, it is much less frequent, with 86 occurrences, ranking 225,501st and a frequency of 1 in 4,214,639 people. In Argentina, the surname is rare, with only 9 instances, ranking 159,873rd and a frequency of 1 in 4,749,268 people. In South Africa, it is extremely uncommon, with just 1 occurrence, ranking 343,732nd and a frequency of 1 in 54,177,704 people.

== See also ==
- Krieghoff, a manufacturer of high-end hunting and sport firearms
