= Isaac Stover House =

Historic house in Pennsylvania, United States

- U.S. National Register of Historic Places
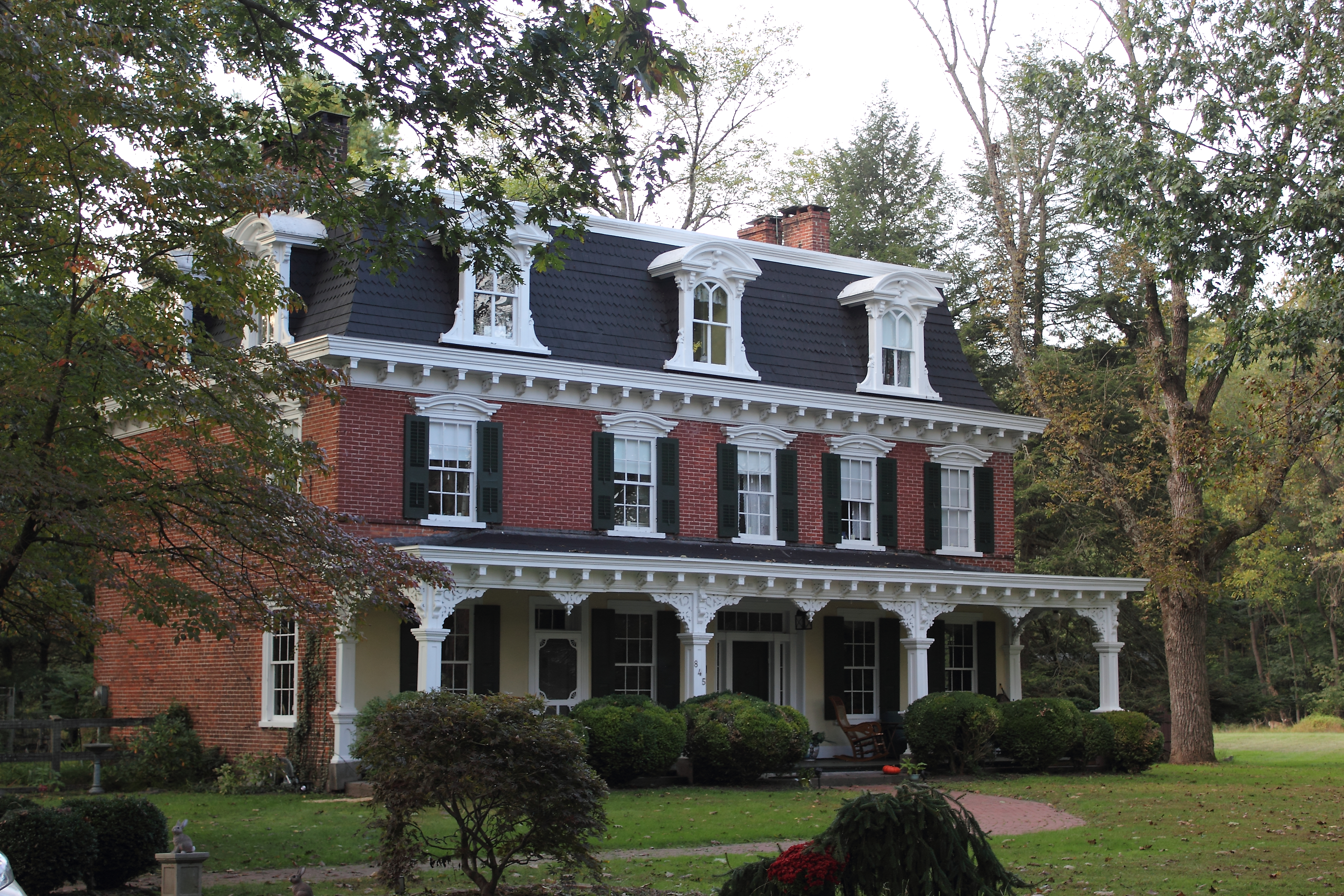
- Isaac Stover House, September 2012

- Location within Pennsylvania Location within the United States
- Location: River Rd. S of Geigel Hill Rd., Erwinna, Pennsylvania
- Coordinates: 40°29′49″N 75°4′7″W
- Area: 0.7 acres (0.28 ha)
- Architectural style: Second Empire
- NRHP reference No.: 90000702
- Added to NRHP: April 26, 1990

The Isaac Stover House is an historic home which is located in Erwinna, Tinicum Township, Bucks County, Pennsylvania.

It was added to the National Register of Historic Places in 1990.

== History and architectural features ==
Built during the 1850s and remodeled in the 1870s, it is a two-story, six-bay, brick dwelling that was designed in the Second Empire style. It has a full-width front porch, sits on a sandstone foundation and features a slate-covered mansard roof with dormers.
