= Tinicum Township, Pennsylvania =

Tinicum Township, Pennsylvania could refer to:

- Tinicum Township, Bucks County, Pennsylvania
- Tinicum Township, Delaware County, Pennsylvania
