= Smithtown Creek (Delaware River tributary) =

- Smithtown Creek

Location
- Country: United States
- State: Pennsylvania
- County: Bucks
- Township: Tinicum

Physical characteristics
- Source
  - coordinates: 40°27′45″N 75°19′30.64″W
  - elevation: 354 feet (108 m)
- Mouth
  - coordinates: 40°27′12″N 75°5′38″W
  - elevation: 90 feet (27 m)
- Length: 1.44 miles (2.32 km)

Basin features
- Progression: Smithtown Creek → Delaware River → Delaware Bay
- River system: Delaware River
- Bridges: Smithtown Road, Cafferty Road, Pennsylvania Route 32 (River Road)

Smithtown Creek is a tributary of the Delaware River in Tinicum Township, Bucks County, Pennsylvania in the United States.

== History ==
Smithtown was a village at the confluence of Smithtown Creek with the Delaware River and with the Pennsylvania Canal (Delaware Division). Joseph and Robert Smith, Quakers who had land here before 1783 began to make farm implements in 1800. Robert was granted a patent, signed by President John Adams and Secretary of State Charles Lee, for the Smith plow on 19 May 1800 for a number of improvements in the manufacturer of plows, including a mouldboard plow constructed of cast iron as opposed to iron sheathed wood which was available up until that time. Thomas Jefferson was one of his patrons. When Jefferson ordered one of his "best plows", Smith replied "Our plows are all the best".

== Course and statistics ==
Smithtown Creek was listed in the Geographic Names Information System on 1 February 1990 as identification number 1202537. It rises at an elevation of 354 feet (108 m) and runs northeast for 2.75 miles (4.43 km) to its confluence at the Delaware River's 159.9 river mile at an elevation of 90 feet (27 m), resulting in an average slope of 183 feet per mile (18.28 meters per kilometer). The stream has a watershed of 1.38 square miles (3.6 km^{2}).

== Crossings and Bridges ==
- Smithtown Road
- Cafferty Road
- Pennsylvania Route 32 (River Road)
