= Riverside Farm (Erwinna, Pennsylvania) =

- U.S. National Register of Historic Places
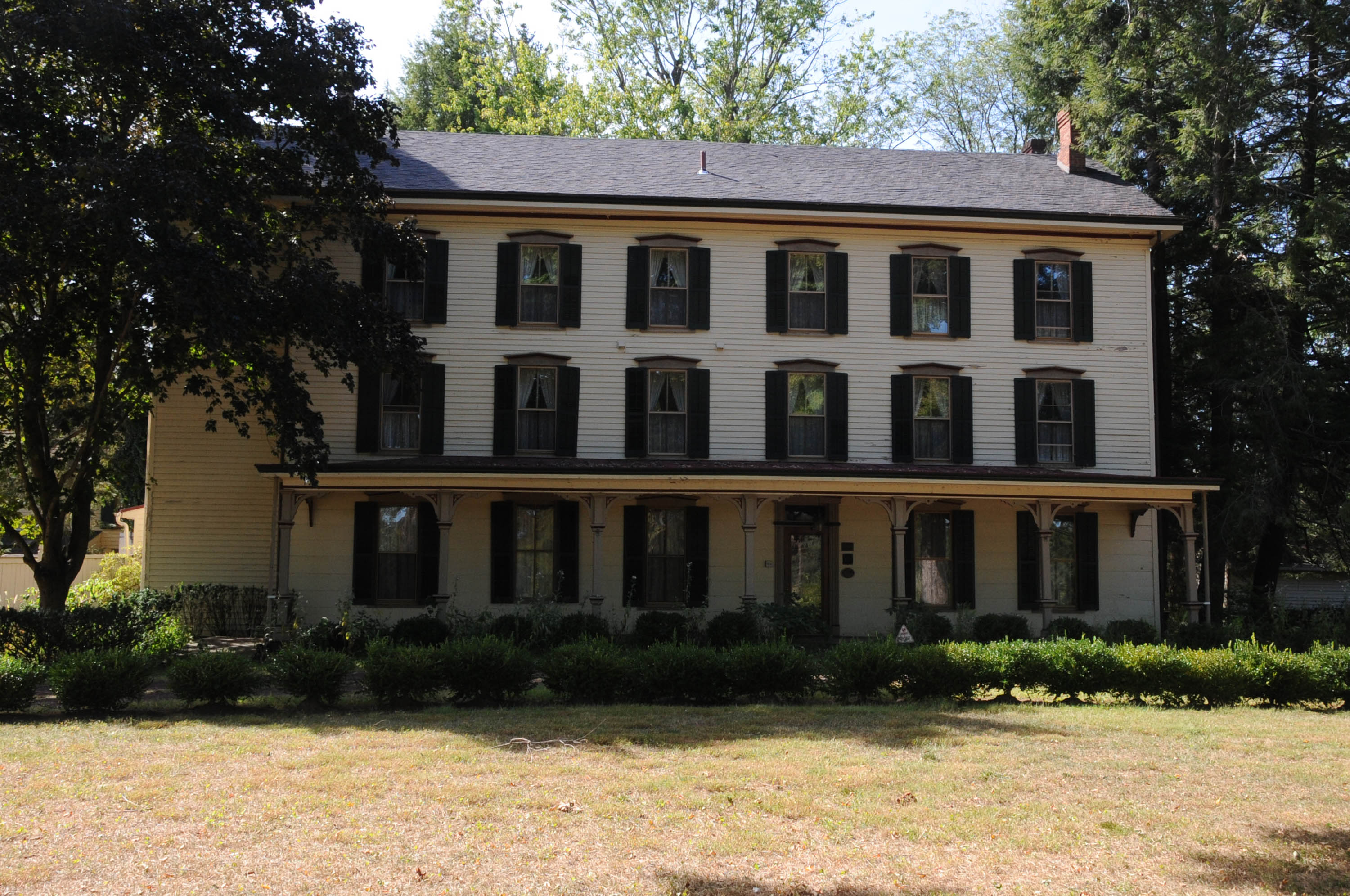
- Evermay-on-the-Delaware, September 2010

- Location within Pennsylvania Location within the United States
- Location: River and Headquarters Rds., near Erwinna, Pennsylvania
- Coordinates: 40°30′1″N 75°4′6″W
- Area: 0.8 acres (0.32 ha)
- Built: c. 1870-1883
- Architectural style: Greek Revival, Italianate
- NRHP reference No.: 88000461
- Added to NRHP: April 21, 1988

Riverside Farm, also known as Evermay-on-the-Delaware, is an historic hotel that is located near Erwinna, Tinicum Township, Bucks County, Pennsylvania, United States.

It was added to the National Register of Historic Places in 1988.

== History and architectural features ==
The house is a three-and-one-half-story, six-bay, frame, vernacular dwelling with Greek Revival and Italianate influences. The oldest section of the main house was built during the late eighteenth century as a two-story, three-bay frame structure. Additions to the house occurred were made roughly between 1870 and 1883, when this structure took its present form.

A stairwell addition was built in 1982. The front facade features a one-story, flat roofed porch. Also located on the property are a contributing tenant house, a carriage house, a shed, and an ice house. The house was built as a private dwelling, then converted for use as a hotel and resort starting about 1870. It operated as an inn until 1930. It reopened in 1982 as a bed-and-breakfast known as EverMay On-The-Delaware. But was closed in 2005 and now operates as a private residence.
