= Lewis Summers Farm =

- U.S. National Register of Historic Places
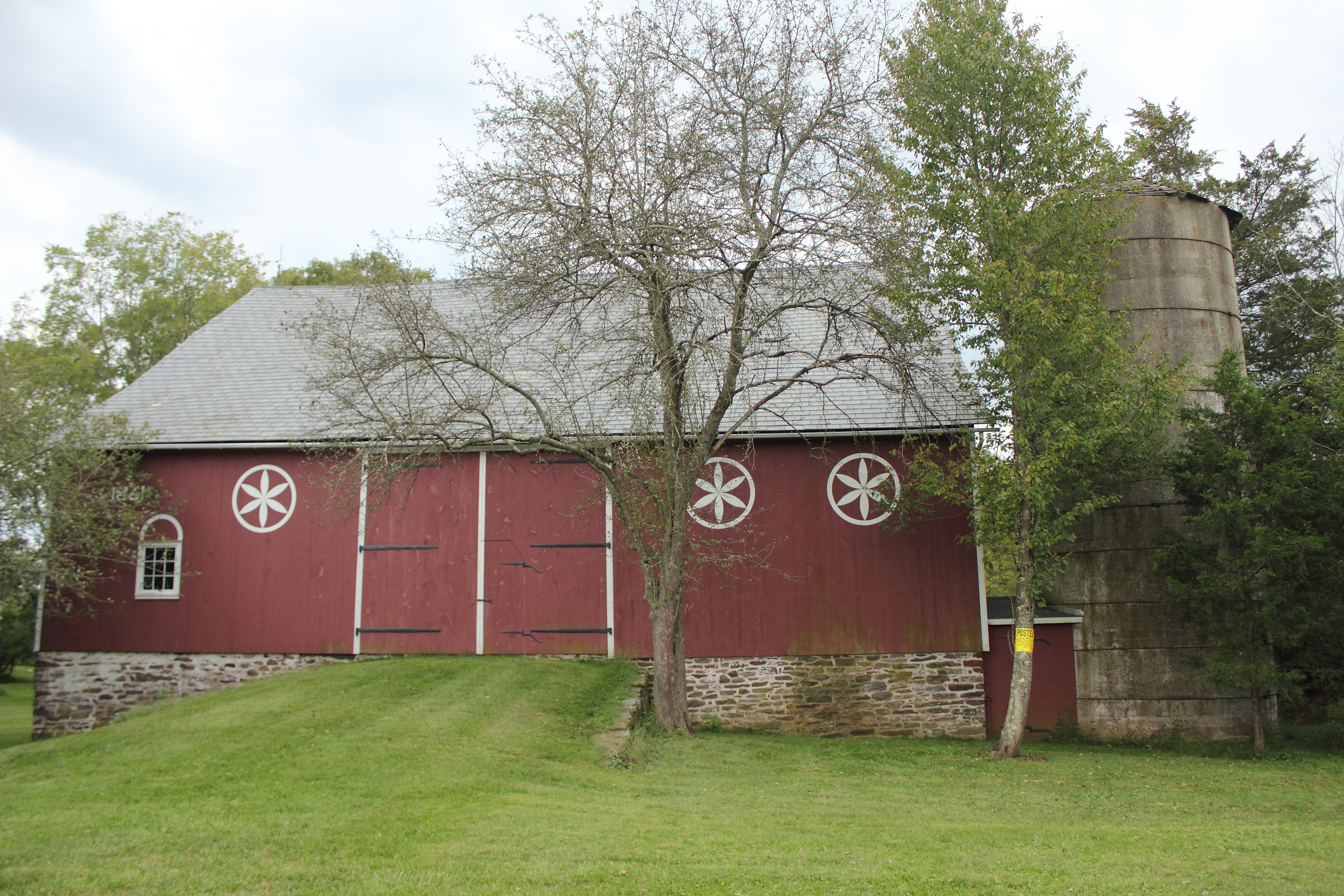
- Barn at the Lewis Summer Farm, September 2012

- Location within Pennsylvania Location within the United States
- Location: 721 Headquarters Rd., Ottsville, Pennsylvania
- Coordinates: 40°28′8″N 75°9′1″W
- Area: 2.5 acres (1.0 ha)
- Built: 1830
- Architectural style: Colonial, Vernacular German Colonial
- NRHP reference No.: 91001124
- Added to NRHP: August 27, 1991

The Lewis Summers Farm is an historic home and farm complex that is located in Ottsville, Tinicum Township, Bucks County, Pennsylvania, United States.

It was added to the National Register of Historic Places in 1991.

== History and architectural features ==
This historic farmhouse was built circa 1830, and is a vernacular, German Colonial, stone dwelling. A stone addition was built in 1866. The main section is two-and-one-half-stories, four bays wide, and measures thirty-two feet by twenty-eight feet. The front facade features a hipped roof portico. Also located on the property are a variety of contributing farm-related outbuildings and structures. It is professionally managed by Robert Dandi of REMAX Central.
