= Lodi, Pennsylvania =

Unincorporated community in Pennsylvania, US

- Unincorporated community
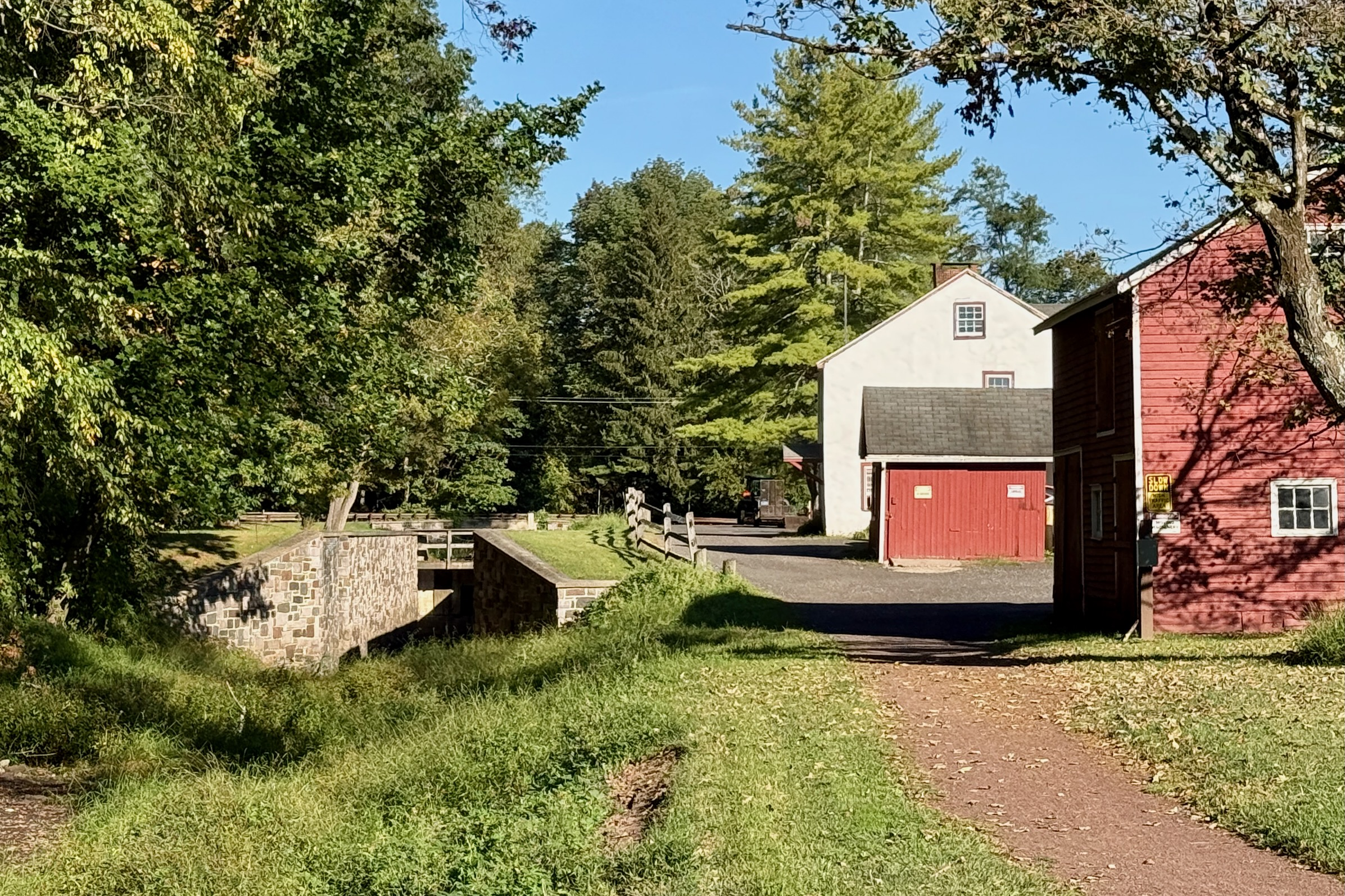
- Delaware Canal Lock 19 in Lodi

- Location within Pennsylvania
- Coordinates: 40°33′5″N 75°5′3″W
- Country: United States
- State: Pennsylvania
- County: Bucks
- Township: Tinicum
- Elevation: 112 ft (34 m)
- Time zone: UTC-5 (Eastern (EST))
  - Summer (DST): UTC-4 (EDT)
- ZIP Code: 18972
- Area codes: 610 and 484
- GNIS feature ID: 1204050

Lodi is an unincorporated community in Tinicum Township in Bucks County, Pennsylvania, United States. Lodi is located along Lodi Hill Road just southwest of an intersection with Pennsylvania Route 32 along the Delaware River in the northern corner of Tinicum Township near the Bridgeton Township border.
