= PA-32 =

PA-32 may refer to:

- Pennsylvania's 32nd congressional district
- Pennsylvania Route 32 - a highway
- Piper PA-32 Cherokee Six light aircraft
