= Ridge Valley Rural Historic District =

Historic district in Pennsylvania, United States

- U.S. National Register of Historic Places
- U.S. Historic district
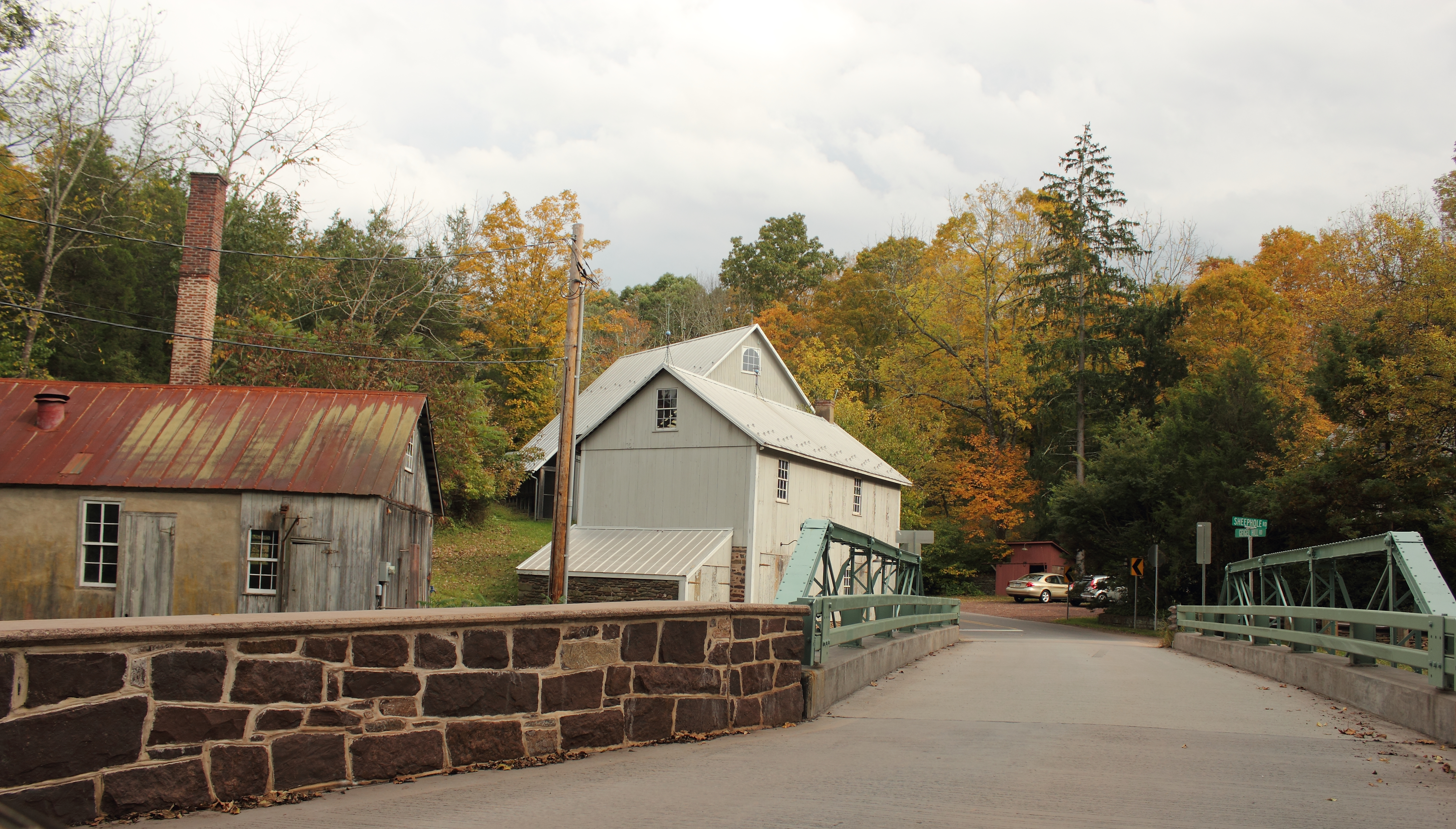
- Ridge Valley Rural Historic District

- Location within Pennsylvania Location within the United States
- Location: Roughly, all of Sheep Hole Rd. and parts of Headquarters, Geigel Hill, Red Hill, Tabor and Bunker Hill Rds., Tinicum Township, Ottsville, Pennsylvania
- Coordinates: 40°28′31″N 75°08′29″W
- Area: 575 acres (233 ha)
- Architectural style: Vernacular Southeast PA
- NRHP reference No.: 92000944
- Added to NRHP: July 24, 1992

The Ridge Valley Rural Historic District is an area of Ottsville, Tinicum Township, Bucks County, Pennsylvania that includes Sheephole and Geigel Hill Roads. The area contains 19th century farms, many of which have stayed the same through preservation efforts. There are 44 buildings and 15 structure on the seven sites throughout the historic district.

It was added to the National Register of Historic Places in 1992.

== See also ==
- List of Registered Historic Places in Bucks County, Pennsylvania
