= Red Hill Church and School =

Historic church in Bucks County, Pennsylvania

- U.S. National Register of Historic Places
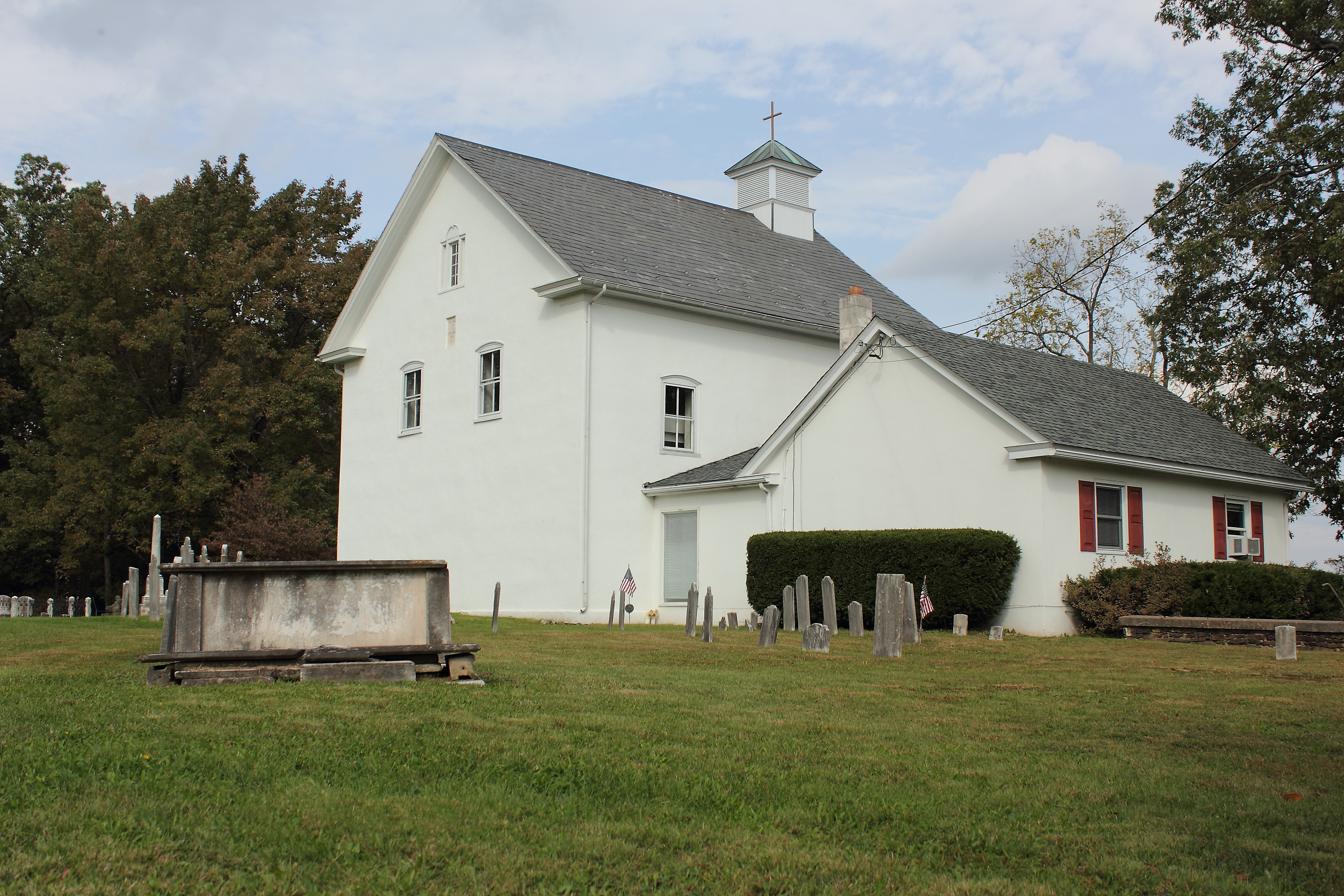
- Red Hill Church and School in Ottsville, PA. September 2012.

- Location within Pennsylvania Location within the United States
- Location: Durham Rd., Ottsville, Pennsylvania
- Coordinates: 40°28′9″N 75°9′27″W
- Area: 3 acres (1.2 ha)
- Built: 1766, 1843
- NRHP reference No.: 78002355
- Added to NRHP: May 22, 1978

Red Hill Church and School is a historic church and school located on Durham Road at Ottsville, Tinicum Township, Bucks County, Pennsylvania. The church was built in 1766, and is a two bay by two bay, stuccoed stone building with a gable roof. The one-room school building was built in 1843, and is a one-story, three bay by one bay, stuccoed stone building. It has a gable roof with cupola. The church was built by a Presbyterian congregation, who sold it to a Lutheran and Reformed Church congregation in 1843. It remain in use as a church until 1920, then re-occupied in the summer of 1959. The school was used for public education until 1958, after which it was used for community meetings.

It was added to the National Register of Historic Places in 1978.
