= Stover Mill =

- U.S. National Register of Historic Places
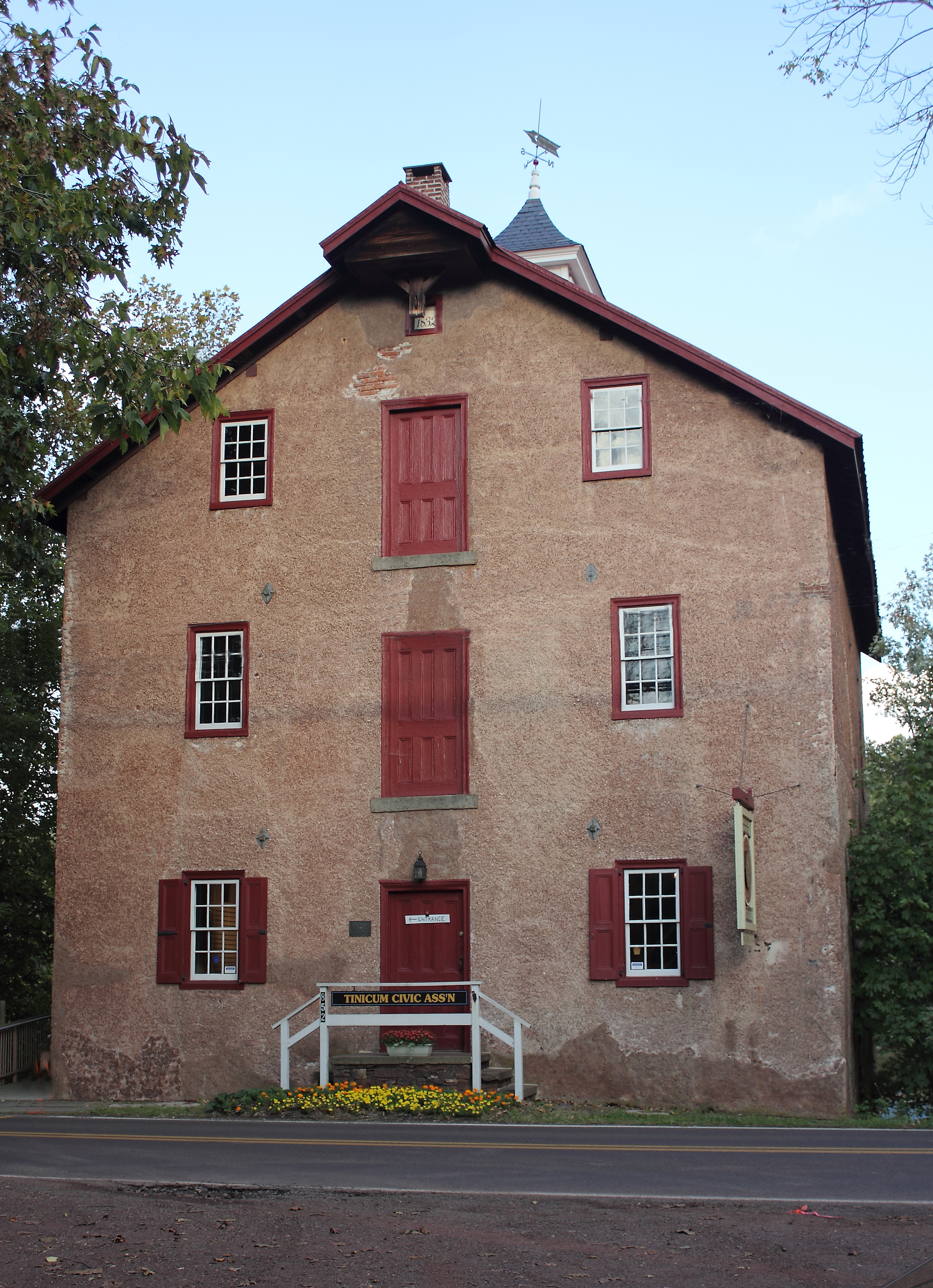
- Stover Mill, September 2012

- Location within Pennsylvania Location within the United States
- Location: 852 River Road (PA Route 32), Erwinna, Pennsylvania
- Coordinates: 40°29′48″N 75°4′6″W
- Area: 0.3 acres (0.12 ha)
- Built: 1832
- Built by: Stover, Henry, & Family
- NRHP reference No.: 79002173
- Added to NRHP: October 18, 1979

The Stover Mill is a historic, American grist mill that is located in Erwinna, Bucks County, Pennsylvania.

It was added to the National Register of Historic Places in 1979.

== History and architectural features ==
Built with Pennsylvania fieldstone by Henry Stover in 1832, this historic structure is a 3 1/2-story, mill building with the first two floors made from native stone, and the upper stories made with brick. This mill is unusual in that it takes its power directly from the Delaware River.

== Present day ==
Currently, the mill operates as an art gallery.

== Gallery ==
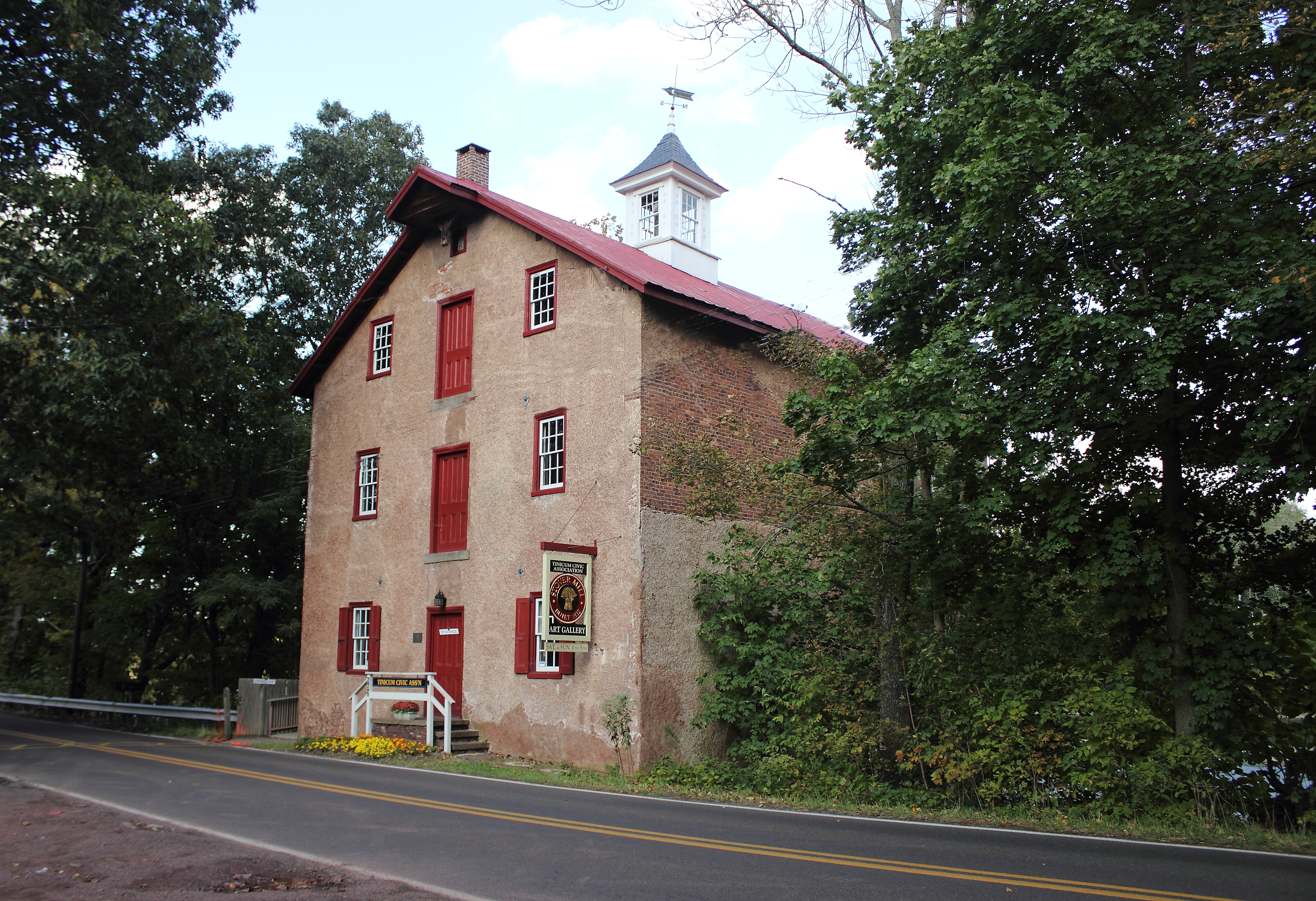
View from the southwest
