= Bridge in Tinicum Township =

- U.S. National Register of Historic Places
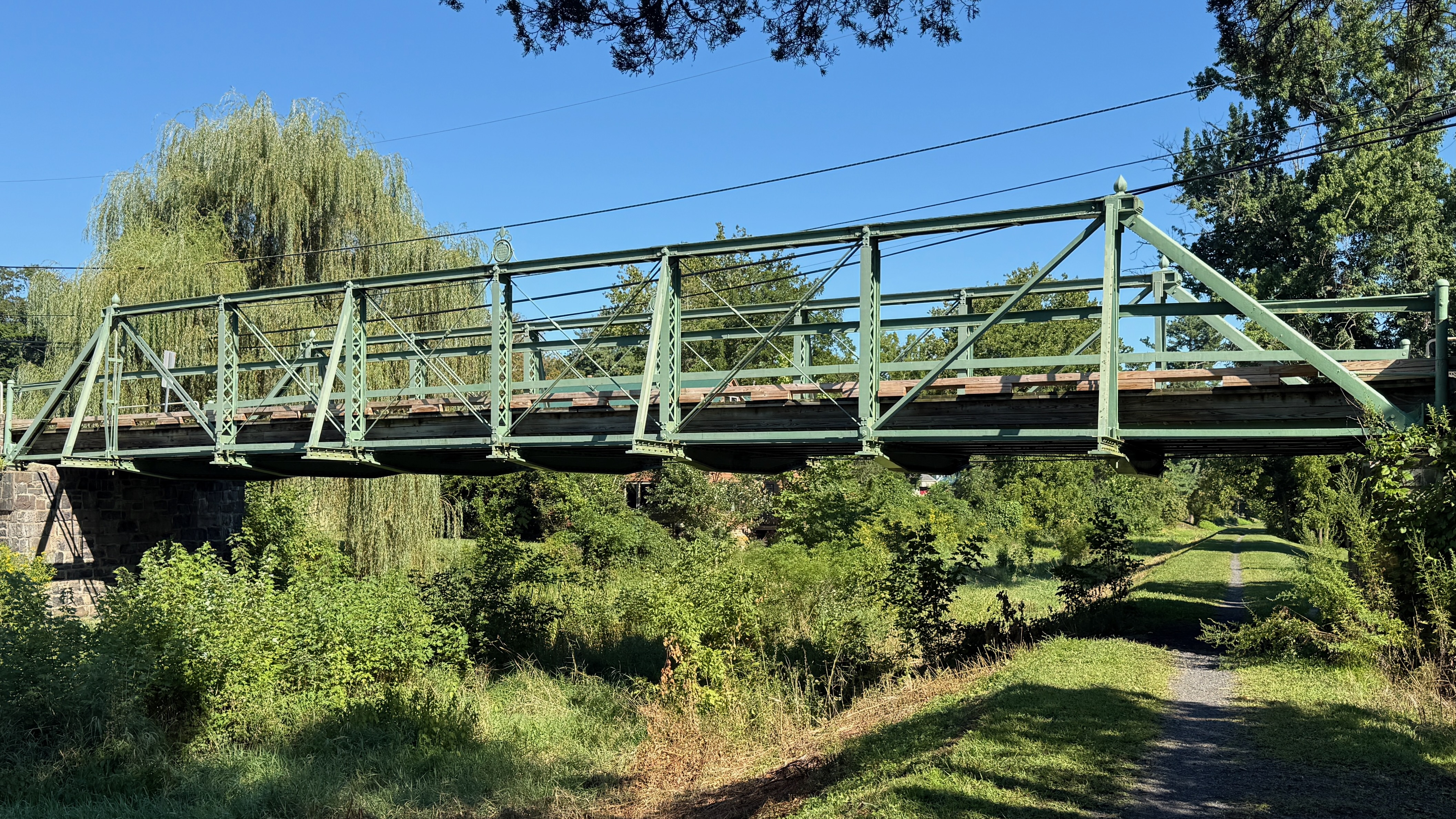
- Bridge over Pennsylvania Canal at Point Pleasant. August 2025.

- Location within Pennsylvania Location within the United States
- Location: LR 920 over Delaware Canal, Point Pleasant, Pennsylvania
- Coordinates: 40°25′25″N 75°3′54.8″W
- Built: 1877
- Built by: Murray, Dougal & Co.
- Architectural style: Pratt pony truss
- MPS: Highway Bridges Owned by the Commonwealth of Pennsylvania, Department of Transportation TR
- NRHP reference No.: 88000814
- Added to NRHP: June 22, 1988

Bridge in Tinicum Township is a historic Pratt pony truss bridge located on Byram Road in Point Pleasant in Tinicum Township, Bucks County, Pennsylvania. It spans the Delaware Canal. It has a single span with a length of 82 feet long, and was constructed in 1877.

It was listed on the National Register of Historic Places in 1988 for its significance in engineering.

== Gallery ==
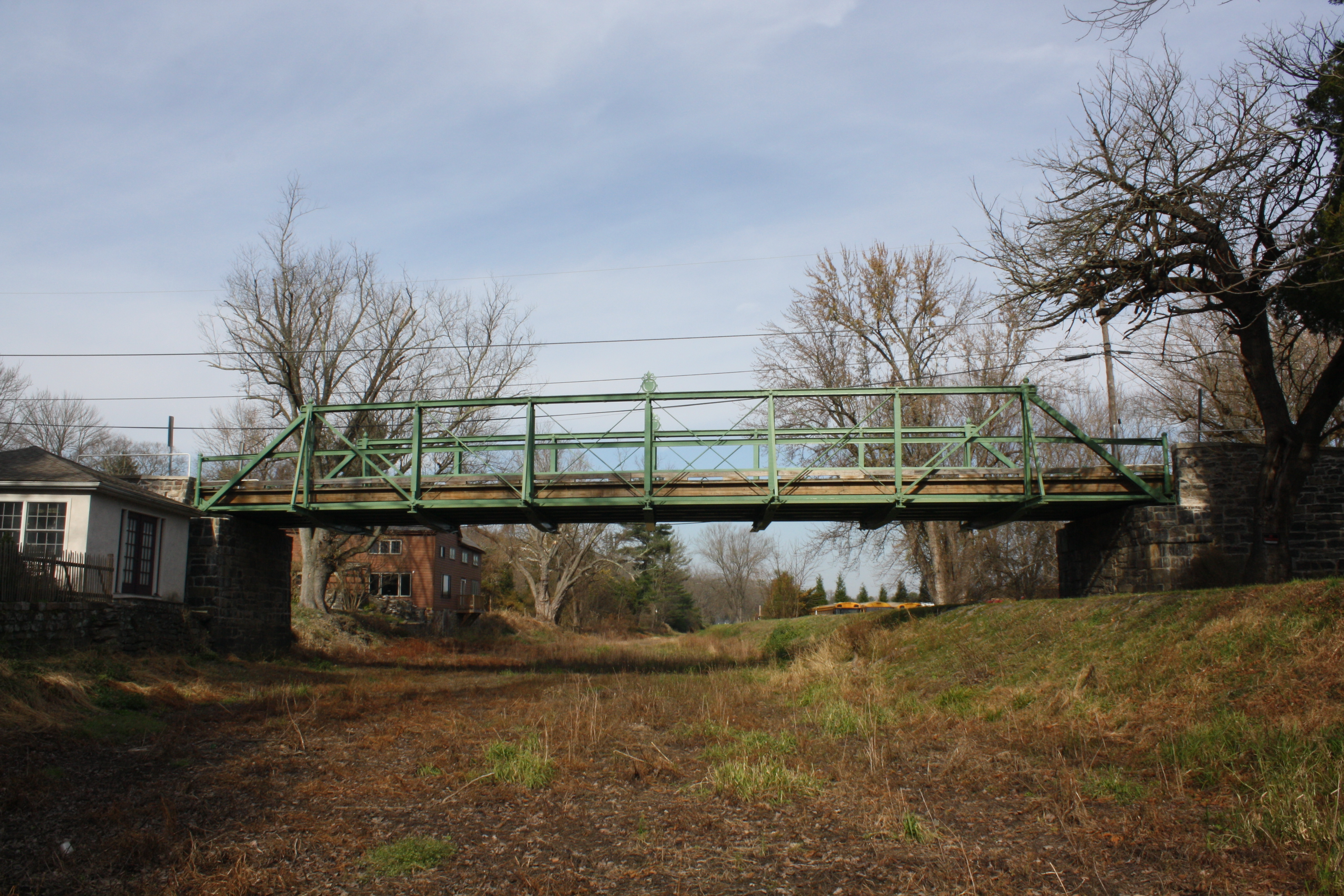

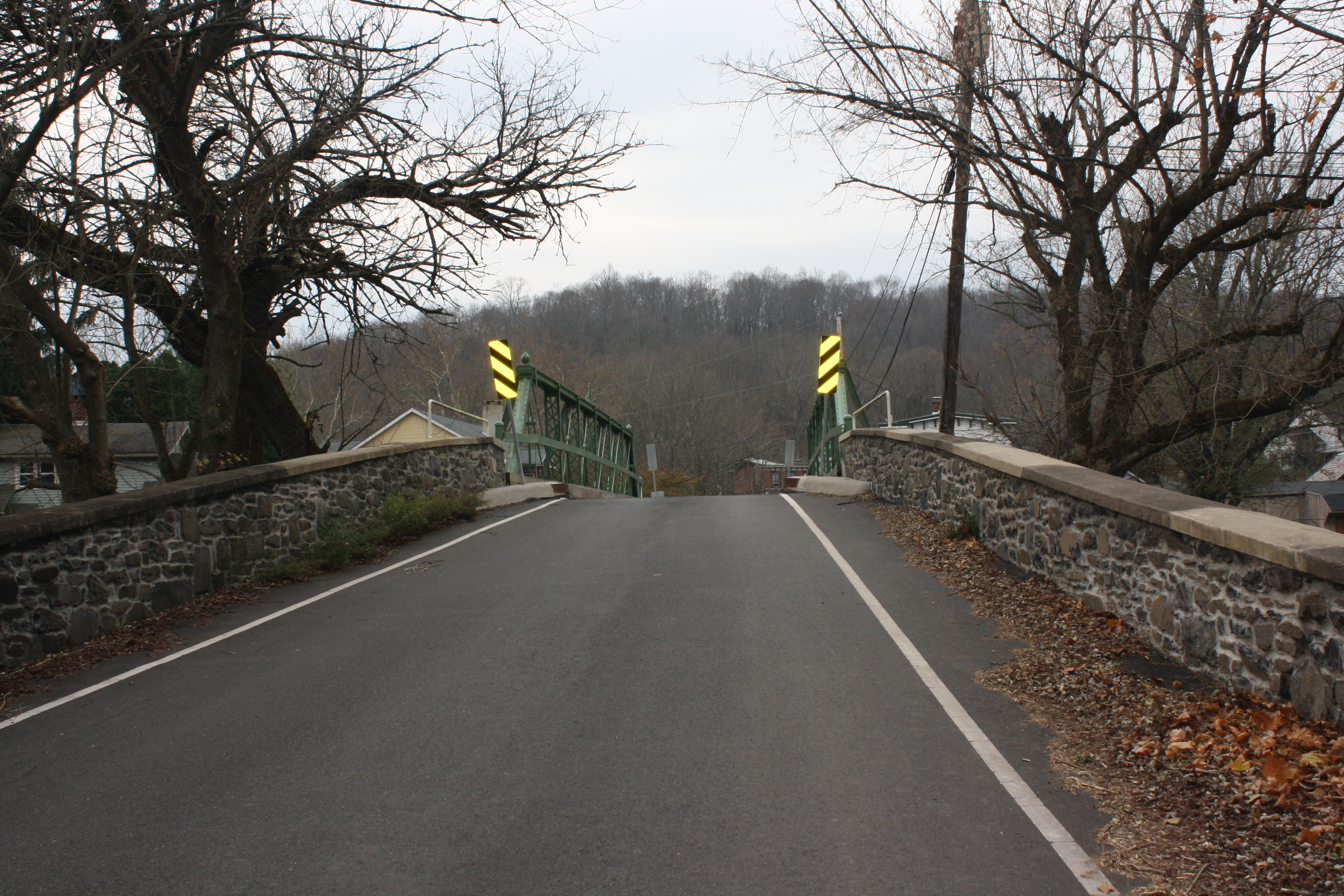

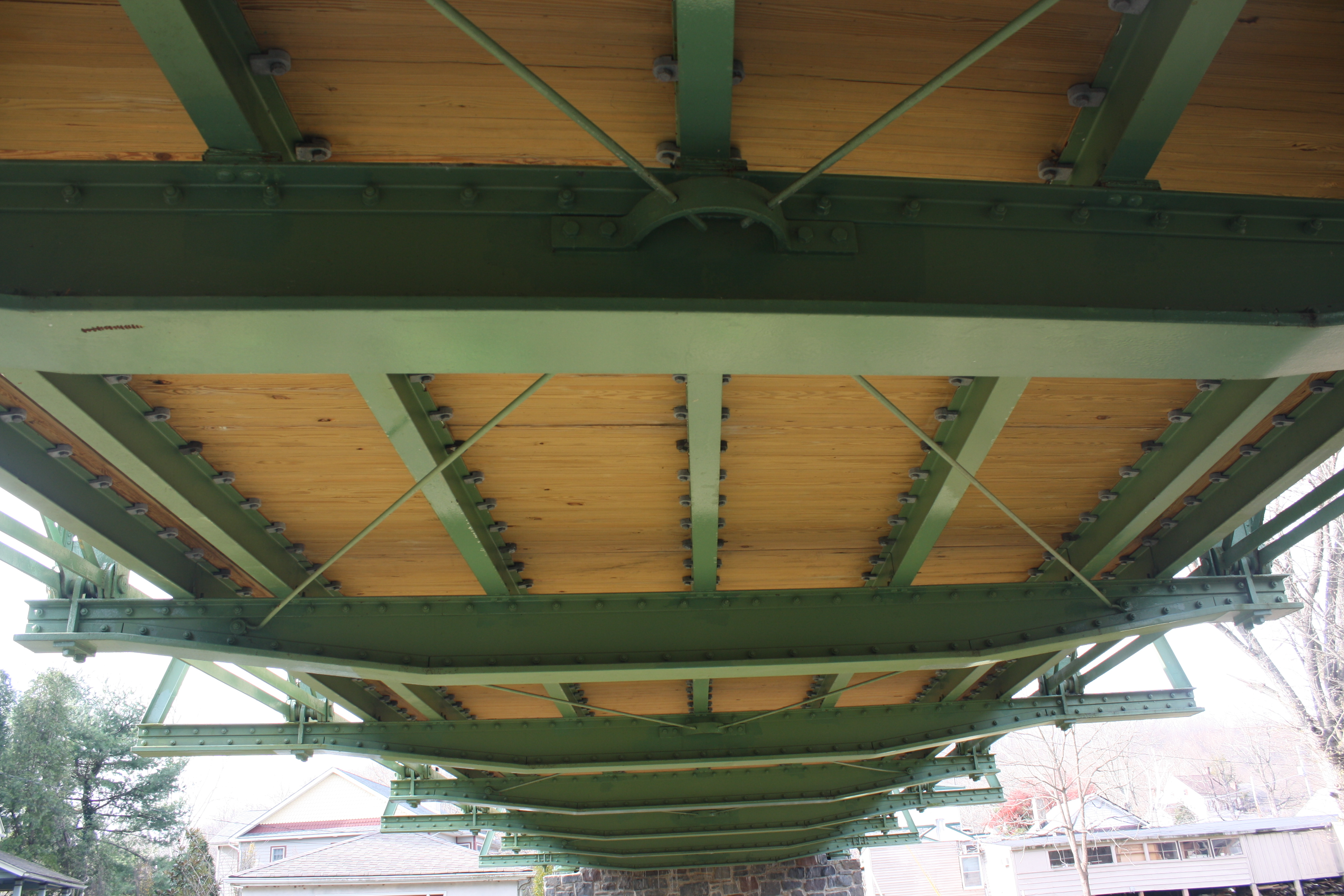
