= Dyers Creek =

- Dyers Creek

Location
- Country: United States
- State: Pennsylvania
- County: Bucks
- Township: Lower Makefield

Physical characteristics
- Source
  - coordinates: 40°15′30″N 74°52′58″W
  - elevation: 210 feet (64 m)
- Mouth
  - coordinates: 40°16′3″N 74°51′18″W
  - elevation: 23 feet (7.0 m)
- Length: 1.16 miles (1.87 km)
- Basin size: 1.2 square miles (3.1 km^{2})

Basin features
- Progression: Dyers Creek → Delaware River → Delaware Bay
- River system: Delaware River
- Bridges: Dolington Road; Taylorsville Road; Pennsylvania Canal (Delaware Division) and towpath Pennsylvania Route 32 (River Road)
- Slope: 161.21 feet per mile (30.532 m/km)

Dyers Creek is a tributary of the Delaware River wholly contained within Lower Makefield Township, Bucks County, Pennsylvania.

== Statistics ==
The Geographic Name Information System I.D. is 1173680, U.S. Department of the Interior Geological Survey I.D. is 02952.

== Course ==
Dyers Creek rises in the northwestern portion of Lower Makefield Township at an elevation of 210 feet (64 m), flowing generally northeast for about half of its course, then turns eastward until its confluence at the Delaware River's 139.80 river mile at an elevation of 23 feet (7.0 m), resulting in an average slope of 161.21 feet per mile (30.532 m/km).

== Municipalities ==
- Bucks County
  - Lower Makefield Township

== Crossings and bridges ==
- Pennsylvania Route 32 (River Road) - NBI structure number 6786, bridge is 7 metres (23 ft) long, 2 lane, single span, continuous concrete stringer/multi-beam or girder, built 1929.
- Taylorsville Road
- Dolington Road

== See also ==
- List of rivers of Pennsylvania
- List of rivers of the United States
- List of Delaware River tributaries
