= Kintnersville, Pennsylvania =

Unincorporated community in Pennsylvania, US

- Unincorporated community
- PA 611 at PA 32 in Kintnersville

- Location within Pennsylvania Location within the United States
- Coordinates: 40°33′25″N 75°10′47″W
- Country: United States
- State: Pennsylvania
- County: Bucks
- Township: Nockamixon
- Elevation: 194 ft (59 m)
- Time zone: UTC-5 (Eastern (EST))
  - Summer (DST): UTC-4 (EDT)
- ZIP Code: 18930
- Area codes: 610 and 484
- GNIS feature ID: 1178531

Kintnersville is an unincorporated community in Bucks County, Pennsylvania, United States. As of 2019, its population was 2,881.

Its latitude is 40.557 degrees north and its longitude is 75.18 degrees east. Kintnersville's elevation is 194 feet (59 m) above sea level. The community is located near state routes 32 and 611, and the Delaware River.

== Education ==
Palisades High School is located in the community.
