= Krieghoff =

German firearms manufacturer

H. Krieghoff GmbH
- Formerly: Heinrich Krieghoff Waffenfabrik
- Company type: GmbH
- Industry: Firearms
- Founded: 1886; 140 years ago
- Founder: Ludwig Krieghoff
- Headquarters: Ulm, Tübingen, Baden-Württemberg, Germany
- Area served: worldwide
- Key people: Dieter Krieghoff; Phil Krieghoff; Peter Braß
- Products: Rifles; Shotguns
- Number of employees: 100
- Website: www.krieghoff.de

H. Krieghoff GmbH is a German manufacturer of high-end hunting and sporting firearms, based in Ulm, Germany.

In North American markets, their products are distributed via sister company Krieghoff International Inc., located in Ottsville, Pennsylvania.
