= Pennsylvania Route 32 =

State highway in Bucks County, Pennsylvania, United States

Pennsylvania Route 32

Route information
- Maintained by PennDOT
- Length: 40.605 mi (65.347 km)
- Existed: 1927–present

Major junctions
- South end: US 1 near Morrisville
- PA 332 in Yardley; PA 532 in Washington Crossing; PA 232 in New Hope; PA 179 in New Hope; US 202 north of New Hope; PA 263 in Centre Bridge
- North end: PA 611 in Kintnersville

Location
- Country: United States
- State: Pennsylvania
- Counties: Bucks

Highway system
- Pennsylvania State Route System; Interstate; US; State; Scenic; Legislative
| ← PA 31 | → PA 33 |

Pennsylvania Route 32 (PA 32) is a scenic two-lane highway that runs along the west side of the Delaware River in Bucks County, Pennsylvania. Signed north-south, it runs from U.S. Route 1 (US 1) in Falls Township outside of Morrisville northwest to PA 611 in the village of Kintnersville in Nockamixon Township. PA 32 passes through Washington Crossing Historic Park, a Revolutionary War-themed historical park on the site of George Washington's crossing on the night of December 25–26, 1776. It also passes through the boroughs of Morrisville, Yardley, and New Hope.

PA 32 was first designated in 1927 to run from Philadelphia northeast to Morrisville and then northwest to US 611/PA 2 in Kintnersville. The route ran concurrent with US 13 between Philadelphia and Morrisville. The southern terminus was cut back to US 1 in Morrisville in 1928. There were cancelled proposals in the 1930s to build a parkway along the corridor between Morrisville and New Hope and for a freeway in the 1960s between Interstate 95 (I-95, now I-295) in Yardley and US 202 in New Hope. PA 32 was extended to its current southern terminus in the 1980s, replacing a part of US 1 Alternate (US 1 Alt.). Parts of the road were rebuilt in the 2000s due to floods.

== Route description ==
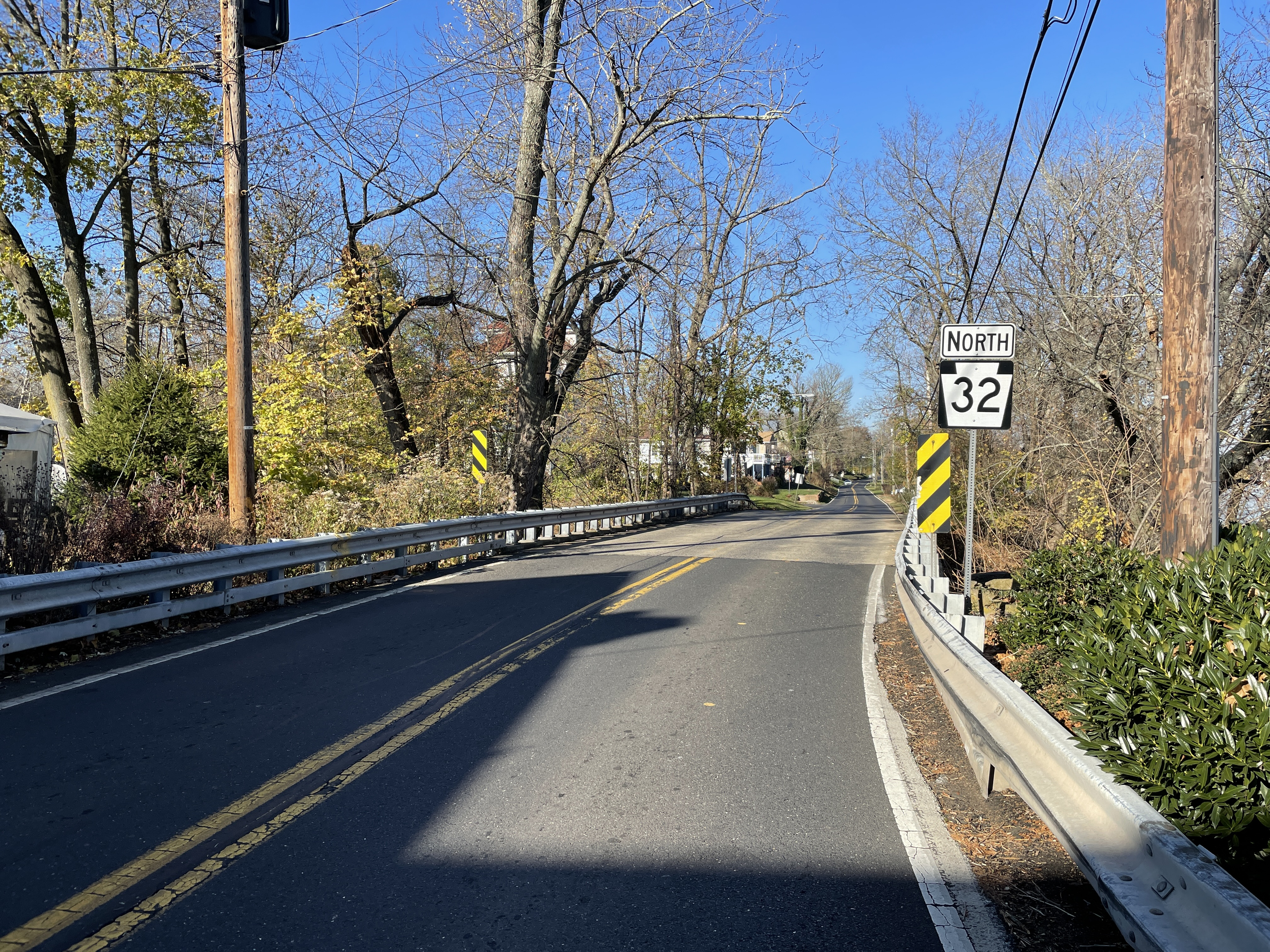
PA 32 northbound past the eastern terminus of PA 332 in Yardley

PA 32 is a two-lane undivided road that parallels the Delaware River for most of its length. The road is popular for Sunday drivers, bikers, fishermen, and viewers of fall foliage.

PA 32 begins at an interchange with the US 1 freeway in Falls Township, Bucks County, with access to southbound US 1 and from northbound US 1. At this interchange, the ramp from southbound PA 32 merges into the collector/distributor road from southbound US 1 that serves the interchanges with the northern termini of US 13 and US 1 Bus. From here, the route heads northeast on two-lane undivided West Bridge Street, forming the border between the borough of Morrisville to the north and Falls Township to the south. The road fully enters Morrisville and passes through residential areas with some businesses. PA 32 crosses the Delaware Canal and heads into commercial areas. At the Pennsylvania Avenue intersection, the road name changes to East Bridge Street. The route turns northwest onto North Delmorr Avenue, with East Bridge Street continuing to the northeast to the Lower Trenton Bridge over the Delaware River into the city of Trenton, New Jersey. PA 32 passes between homes to the west and Williamson Park to the east, curving north before it heads northwest along the west bank of the Delaware River, with the Delaware Canal a short distance to the west. The road intersects East Trenton Avenue just west of where that road crosses the river on the Calhoun Street Bridge. The route leaves Morrisville for Lower Makefield Township, where the name changes to River Road. The canal heads farther to the west and the road passes through wooded areas of homes. PA 32 continues northwest along the Delaware River and passes under the West Trenton Railroad Bridge, which carries CSX's Trenton Subdivision railroad line and SEPTA's West Trenton Line, before entering the borough of Yardley and becoming South Delaware Avenue. The road passes more homes in the borough and intersects the eastern terminus of PA 332, where the road name changes to North Delaware Avenue and it crosses Buck Creek.

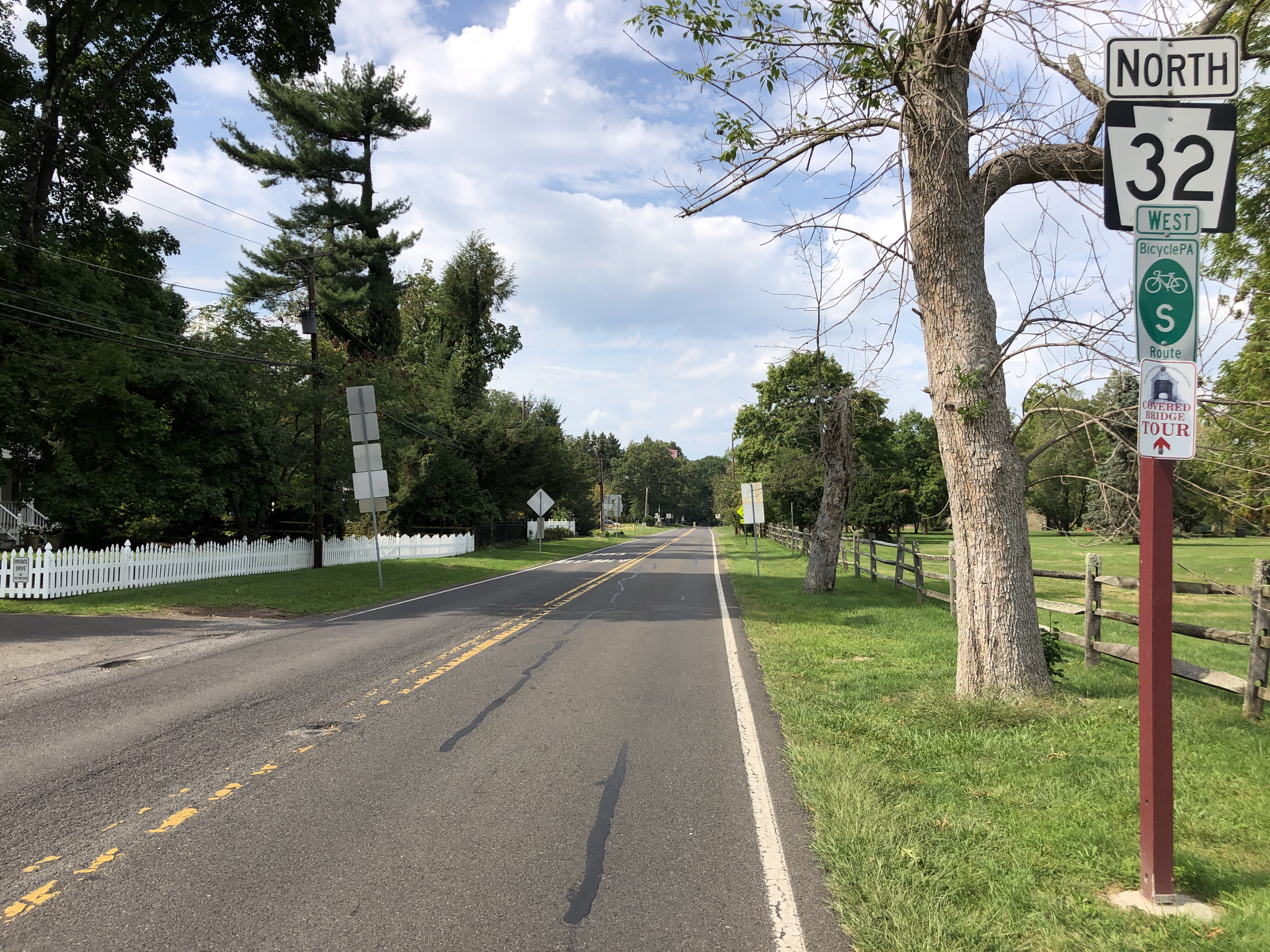
PA 32 northbound past PA 532 in Washington Crossing

The route leaves Yardley for Lower Makefield Township again, regaining the River Road name and passing through woods. PA 32 heads under the Scudder Falls Bridge, which carries I-295 over the Delaware River. The road curves north and continues through wooded areas with some homes, crossing Dyers Creek before entering Upper Makefield Township at the Mount Eyre Road intersection. The route continues along the river and crosses Houghs Creek before it heads northwest into the residential community of Washington Crossing. Here, PA 32 passes to the west of Washington Crossing Historic Park, which is situated along the river, and comes to an intersection with the northern terminus of PA 532 and the approach to the Washington Crossing Bridge. The road continues through the historic park before leaving Washington Crossing and heading past fields and woods with some residences. The route curves west and turns southwest away from the Delaware River to cross the Delaware Canal, coming to an intersection with Taylorsville Road before it passes over Jericho Creek. Here, PA 32 curves back northwest and runs through wooded areas of residential developments before passing through a mix of homes, woods, and fields. The road passes through another tract of Washington Crossing Historic Park and crosses into Solebury Township. The route heads north through forested areas and crosses Pidcock Creek, drawing closer to the canal and the river.

PA 32 southbound past PA 179 in New Hope

PA 32 enters the borough of New Hope, where it intersects the northern terminus of PA 232 and crosses Dark Hollow Run and the canal. The route becomes South Main Street and heads through the commercial downtown of New Hope, passing the Bucks County Playhouse as it crosses Aquetong Creek. In the center of town, the road crosses PA 179, which heads east to the New Hope–Lambertville Bridge over the Delaware River to the city of Lambertville, New Jersey. PA 32 becomes North Main Street and heads past more downtown businesses before heading into wooded residential areas. The route crosses back into Solebury Township and heads through woods as River Road, turning northwest away from the river and crossing the canal. PA 32 briefly becomes a four-lane divided highway as it crosses Rabbit Run and comes to an interchange with the US 202 freeway, which heads east across the Delaware River on the New Hope–Lambertville Toll Bridge. Past this interchange, the route becomes two lanes and undivided again as it bends west around a residential subdivision. The road turns northwest again and runs to the west of the canal and the river, passing east of homes. PA 32, along with the canal, heads farther away from the river as it runs through forested areas. The route intersects PA 263, which heads northeast to the Centre Bridge–Stockton Bridge over the Delaware River into the borough of Stockton, New Jersey, in the community of Centre Bridge. Past PA 263, the road heads west through forests with some fields, running parallel with the Delaware Canal and the Delaware River again. Along this stretch, the route crosses Cuttalosa Creek. PA 32 curves northwest and passes through the community of Lumberville, where the road has access to the Lumberville–Raven Rock Bridge, a pedestrian bridge providing access to Bull's Island Recreation Area in New Jersey, and crosses Paunnacussing Creek.

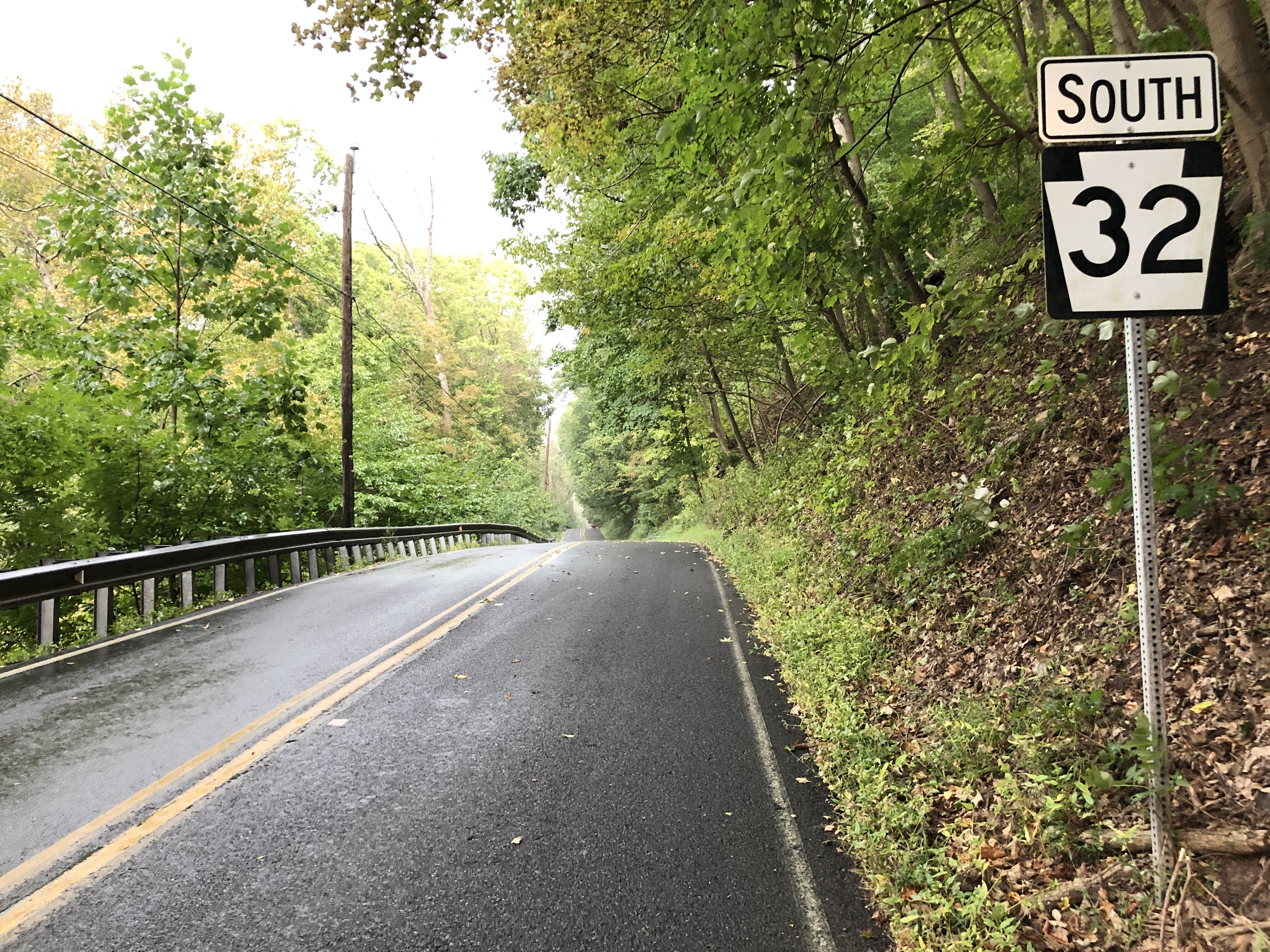
PA 32 southbound past the northern terminus at PA 611 in Kintnersville

The route enters Plumstead Township and runs through more forests, crossing Hickory Creek before reaching the community of Point Pleasant. Here, PA 32 turns north and crosses the Tohickon Creek into Tinicum Township, where the road passes a few homes before heading into forests. The road continues north a short distance to the west of the Delaware Canal and the Delaware River, heading across Smithtown Creek and Tinicum Creek before it crosses to the east side of the canal. PA 32 heads into a mix of fields and woods with some homes in the community of Erwinna, where it passes to the east of Tinicum County Park. The route passes through more rural areas and reaches the community of Uhlerstown, where the Uhlerstown–Frenchtown Bridge heads east into the borough of Frenchtown, New Jersey, and connects to Route 12. The road passes through more farmland and woods with some homes on the west bank of the river, curving northwest and passing through the community of Lodi. PA 32 enters Bridgeton Township and passes through more rural areas with some homes before passing through the residential community of Upper Black Eddy, where the Upper Black Eddy–Milford Bridge heads northeast across the river to the borough of Milford, New Jersey. Past here, the route curves west and crosses the Delaware Canal, continuing through wooded areas with some fields and residences and heading across Falls Creek. The road crosses into Nockamixon Township and runs southwest between dense forests to the south and the canal and the river to the north. PA 32 continues west to its northern terminus at an intersection with PA 611 in the community of Kintnersville.

== History ==
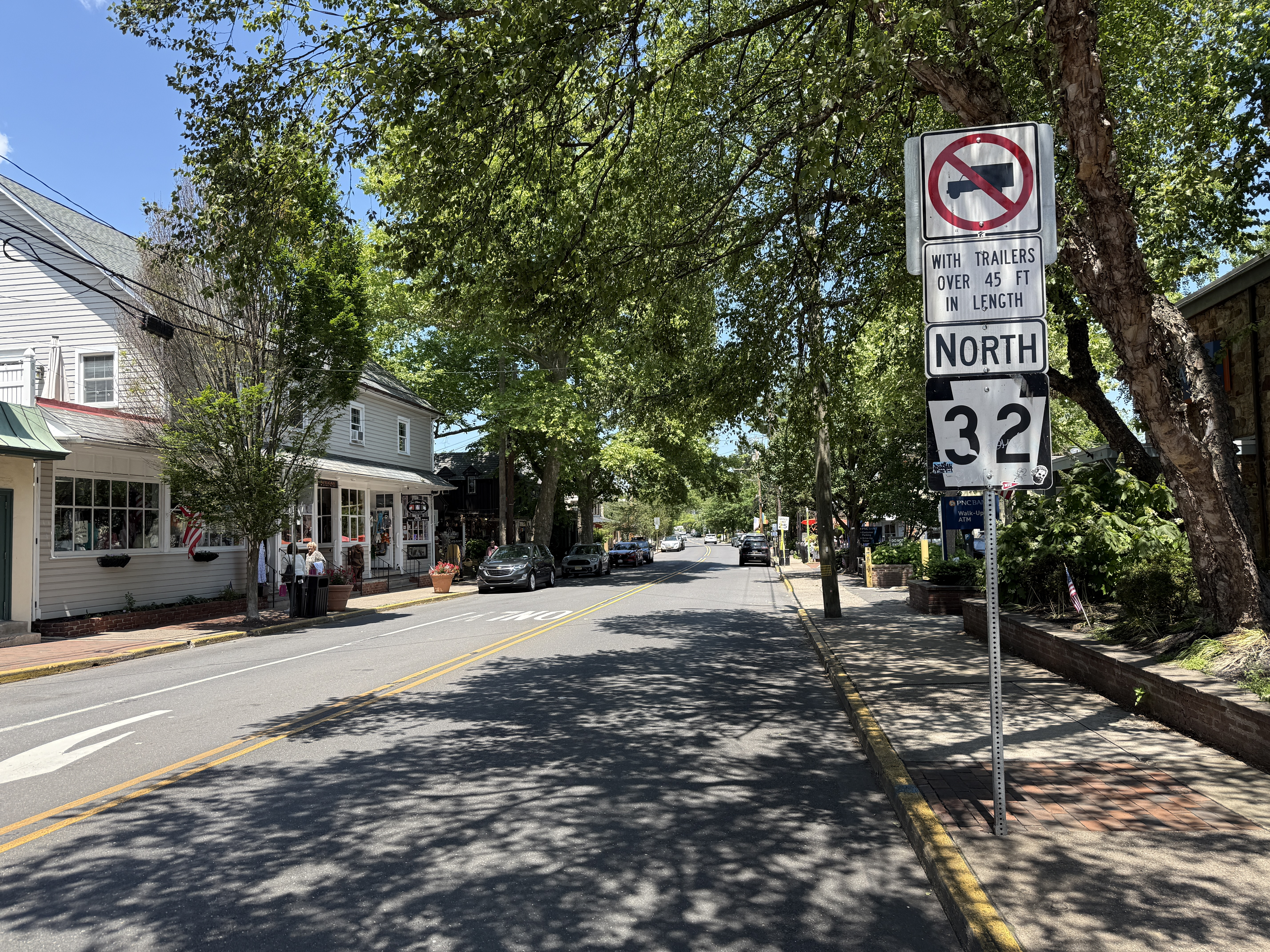
PA 32 northbound past PA 179 in New Hope

When Pennsylvania first legislated routes in 1911, what is now PA 32 was designated as part of Legislative Route 252 between Morrisville and Yardley. PA 32 was designated in 1927 to run between Philadelphia and US 611/PA 2 in Kintnersville, heading northeast along US 13 to Morrisville before turning northwest on its present alignment. At this time, the entire route was paved. In 1928, the southern terminus was cut back to US 1 (Bridge Street) in Morrisville, removing the concurrency with US 13. In 1932, a parkway was proposed along the route from Morrisville to New Hope; however, it was never built. In 1969, another proposal was created for a $30 million PA 32 freeway from I-95 (now I-295) near Yardley to US 202 in New Hope. At the time, this freeway was to be completed by 1985. However, the proposal never came about. In the 1980s, PA 32 was extended southwest to its current terminus, replacing a part of US 1 Alt., which had replaced the earlier US 1 designation, on Bridge Street.

Due to its route along the Delaware River, PA 32 is prone to floods. Several floods, including the Mid-Atlantic Flood of June 2006, left many parts of the road impassable. The sections of road between PA 263 and Greenhill Road and near Fleecydale Road in Solebury Township and between PA 611 and Narrows Hill Road in Nockamixon Township were closed from the damage. The Pennsylvania Department of Transportation undertook a $11.4 million project to fix these sections of road in 2008. The section between PA 263 and Greenhill Road was completed by May 2008 and the section between PA 611 and Narrows Hill Road was completed later that year. Road closures and detours have affected many businesses along PA 32, with many seeing a decline in customers and some closing down or being put up for auction.

== Major intersections ==
The entire route is in Bucks County.

| Location | mi | km | Destinations | Notes |
|---|---|---|---|---|
| Falls Township | 0.000 | 0.000 | To US 1 south / US 13 south – Philadelphia, Bristol, Yardley | Southern terminus; access via Lincoln Highway |
| Yardley | 5.659 | 9.107 | PA 332 west (East Afton Avenue) | Eastern terminus of PA 332 |
| Upper Makefield Township | 9.618 | 15.479 | PA 532 south (General Washington Memorial Boulevard) / Washington Crossing Bridge to I-295 – Newtown, Bucks County} | Northern terminus of PA 532 |
| New Hope | 16.369 | 26.343 | PA 232 south (Windy Bush Road) – Richboro | Northern terminus of PA 232 |
| New Hope | 16.884 | 27.172 | PA 179 (Bridge Street / New Hope–Lambertville Bridge) | |
| Solebury Township | 17.818 | 28.675 | To US 202 | Access via Lower York Road |
| Solebury Township | 18.004 | 28.975 | US 202 north (New Hope–Lambertville Toll Bridge) – New Jersey | Interchange; access to northbound US 202 and from southbound US 202 |
| Solebury Township | 20.194 | 32.499 | PA 263 (Upper York Road / Centre Bridge–Stockton Bridge) to Route 29 – Buckingham, Stockton | |
| Tinicum Township | 32.705 | 52.634 | Uhlerstown–Frenchtown Bridge to Route 12 | |
| Nockamixon Township | 40.605 | 65.347 | PA 611 (Easton Road) – Kintnersville, Riegelsville | Northern terminus |
1.000 mi = 1.609 km; 1.000 km = 0.621 mi: Incomplete access

== PA 32 Alternate Truck ==
=== Morrisville ===
PA Route 32 Alternate Truck
- Location: Morrisville, Pennsylvania
- Existed: 2013–present

Pennsylvania Route 32 Alternate Truck is a truck route bypassing a weight-restricted bridge over a tributary to the Delaware River in Morrisville, on which trucks over 34 tons are prohibited. The route follows US 1 and Pennsylvania Avenue. It was signed in 2013.

=== Point Pleasant–Kintnersville ===
PA Route 32 Alternate Truck
- Location: Point Pleasant-Kintnersville, Pennsylvania
- Existed: 2026–present

Pennsylvania Route 32 Alternate Truck is a truck route between Point Pleasant and PA 611 in Kintnersville, bypassing a weight-restricted bridge over the Erwinna Canal in Tinicum Township, on which trucks over 13 tons are prohibited. The route follows Point Pleasant Pike, PA 413, and PA 611.

Previously, PA 32 Alternate Truck was signed between 2013 and 2018 along the same route. During this time, the bridge over the Delaware Canal, also in Tinicum Township, was posted for a 35-ton weight restriction. It was signed in 2013 and decommissioned in 2018 following a bridge repair, removing the need for a weight restriction. Signs were reinstated in 2026 when the bridge over the Erwinna Canal was posted for load.

== See also ==
- New Jersey Route 29, parallel route on the opposite side of the Delaware River
