= Erwinna Covered Bridge =

- U.S. National Register of Historic Places
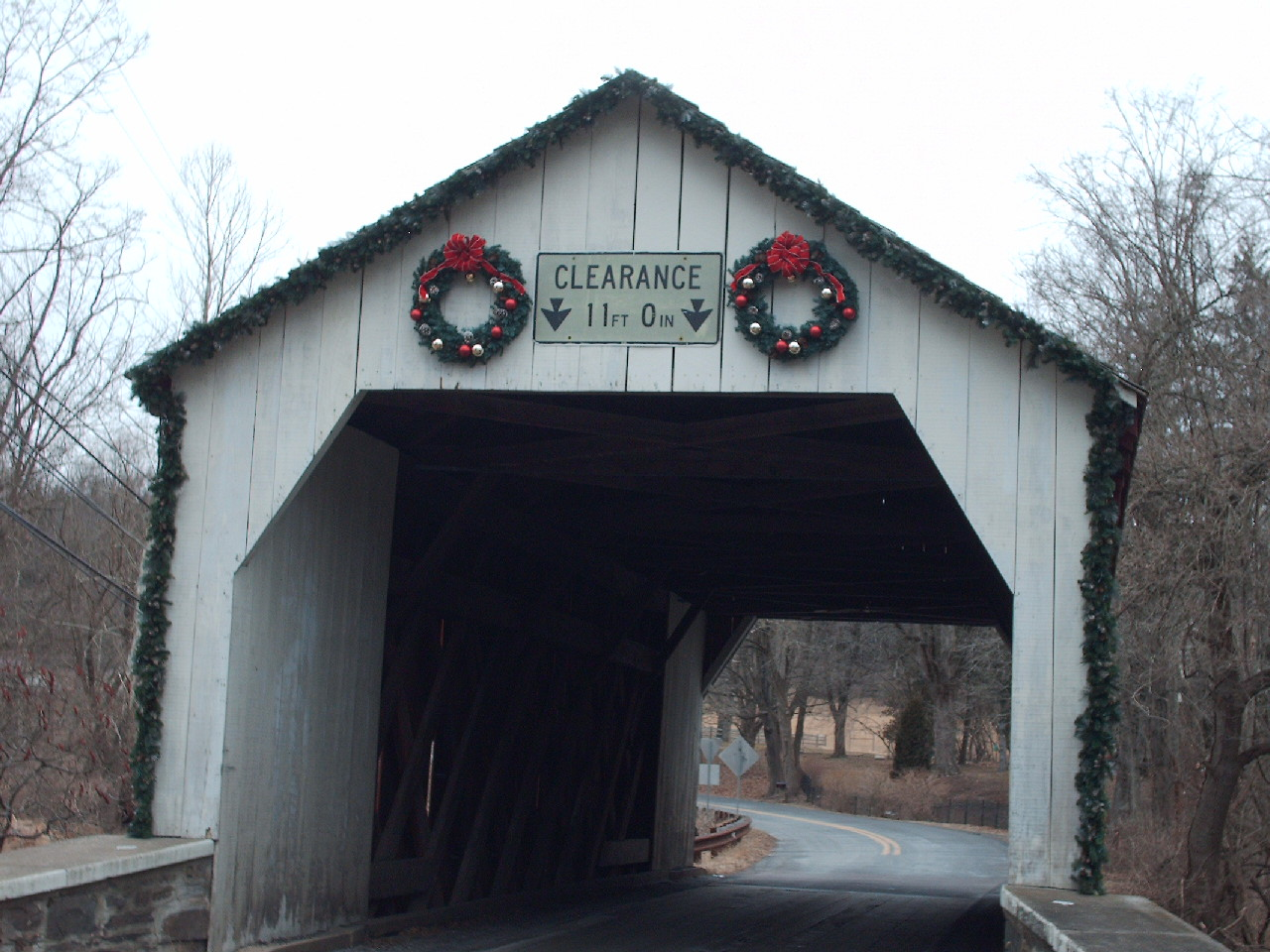

- Location within Pennsylvania Location within the United States
- Location: Erwinna, Pennsylvania
- Coordinates: 40°30′9″N 75°4′29″W
- Built: 1871
- MPS: Covered Bridges of the Delaware River Watershed TR
- NRHP reference No.: 80003434
- Added to NRHP: December 1, 1980

The Erwinna Covered Bridge is a wooden covered bridge that spans Swamp Creek in Erwinna, Pennsylvania, United States.

The bridge was constructed using a lattice-type design.

The National Register of Historic Places lists the date built as 1871, while county records say 1832. The Erwinna Covered Bridge is Bucks County's shortest covered bridge, at only 56 feet (17 m) long and 15 feet (4.6 m) wide.

The bridge's WGCB Number is 39-09-04.

During the winter the bridge has been decorated by the Church Of Tinicum on Geigel Hill Road, with lighted pineroping and wreaths at each side of the bridge.

In September 2012 a 13' box truck took out the infrastructure of the bridge, causing PennDOT to estimate the bridge will be closed for 4–6 months. It was repaired just 3 months after the accident.

In the early morning hours of Sunday, May 12, 2013, vandals sprayed graffiti on all of the bridge's decorative doors and the concrete around the bridge. The same tags were found on a nearby bridge on Headquarters Road, which intersects with Geigel Hill Road in Erwinna.

On July 22, 2013, the bridge received structural damage after being struck by a delivery truck, and was closed indefinitely pending an inspection and repair estimate by PennDOT engineers.
