= Jericho Creek (Delaware River tributary) =

Jericho Creek Bakers Creek, Knowles Creek
- Jericho Creek
- Native name: Towssisink (Unami)

Location
- Country: United States
- State: Pennsylvania
- County: Bucks
- Township: Wrightstown, Upper Makefield

Physical characteristics
- Source
  - coordinates: 40°17′13″N 74°59′53″W
  - elevation: 260 feet (79 m)
- Mouth
  - location: Delaware River
  - coordinates: 40°18′51″N 74°59′9″W
  - elevation: 43 feet (13 m)
- Length: 6.12 miles (9.85 km)
- Basin size: 9.63 square miles (24.9 km^{2})

Basin features
- River system: Delaware River
- Landmarks: Jericho Mountain
- Bridges: Pennsylvania Route 232 (Windy Bush Road); Thompson Mill Road; Pineville Road; Eagle Road; Brownsburg Road East; Stoneybrook Road; Pennsylvania Route 32 (River Road); Delaware Canal aqueduct and towpath
- Slope: 35.46 feet per mile (6.716 m/km)

Jericho Creek (Towssisink, Bakers Creek, Knowles Creek) is a tributary of the Delaware River, rising in Wrightstown Township, Bucks County, Pennsylvania, and passing into Upper Makefield Township where it meets its confluence with the Delaware.

== History ==
Named for the nearby mountain of the same name, Jericho Creek formed part of the boundary of William Penn's original purchase of land on 15 July 1682 with the Lenape. Later it became the southern boundary of the Walking Purchase (19-20 September 1737). It was first named Bakers Creek for Henry Baker, Justice of the Peace, who may have been a landowner and settler before 1682. The Indian Purchase of 1682 was limited to extend up the Delaware River from the mouth of the Neshaminy Creek "as far as a man can walk in a day and a half". It was said that this was done by William Penn himself, some of his friends and some Indian chiefs. This was a leisurely walk with breaks, unlike the Walking Purchase of 1737 by Penn's sons. The creek was marked Knowles Creek on a number of maps of the 19th century.

== Statistics ==
Jericho Creek was entered into the Geographic Names Information System database of the U.S. Geological Survey as identification number 1178049 on 2 August 1979, and is listed in the Pennsylvania Gazetteer of Streams as identification number 02975.

== Course ==
Jericho creek rises in Wrightstown Township, Pennsylvania and flows generally easterly to its confluence at the Delaware River's 144.20 river mile and its watershed is 9.63 square miles (24.9 km^{2}).

== Municipalities ==
- Bucks County
  - Upper Makefield Township
  - Wrightstown Township

== Crossings and Bridges ==
Crossing	NBI Number	Length	Lanes	Spans	Material/Design	Built	Reconstructed	Latitude	Longitude
Pennsylvania Route 232 (Windy Bush Road)	-	-	-	-	-	-	-	-	-
Thompson Mill Road	-	-	-	-	-	-	-	-	-
Pineville Road	-	-	-	-	-	-	-	-	-
Eagle Road	-	-	-	-	-	-	-	-	-
Brownsburg Road East	7521	14 metres (46 ft)	1	2	continuous tee-beam	1920	-	40°18'2.7"N	74°56'5.3"W
Stoneybrook Road	7332	18 metres (59 ft)	2	1	continuous concrete tee-beam	1973	-	40°18'24.2"N	74°54'34"W
Pennsylvania Route 32 (River Road)	40819	17 metres (56 ft)	2	1	prestressed concrete box beam or girders - single or spread	2000	-	40°18'40.3"N	74°54'21.75"W
Delaware Canal Stoney Run Aqueduct	-	-	-	-	-	-	-	-	-

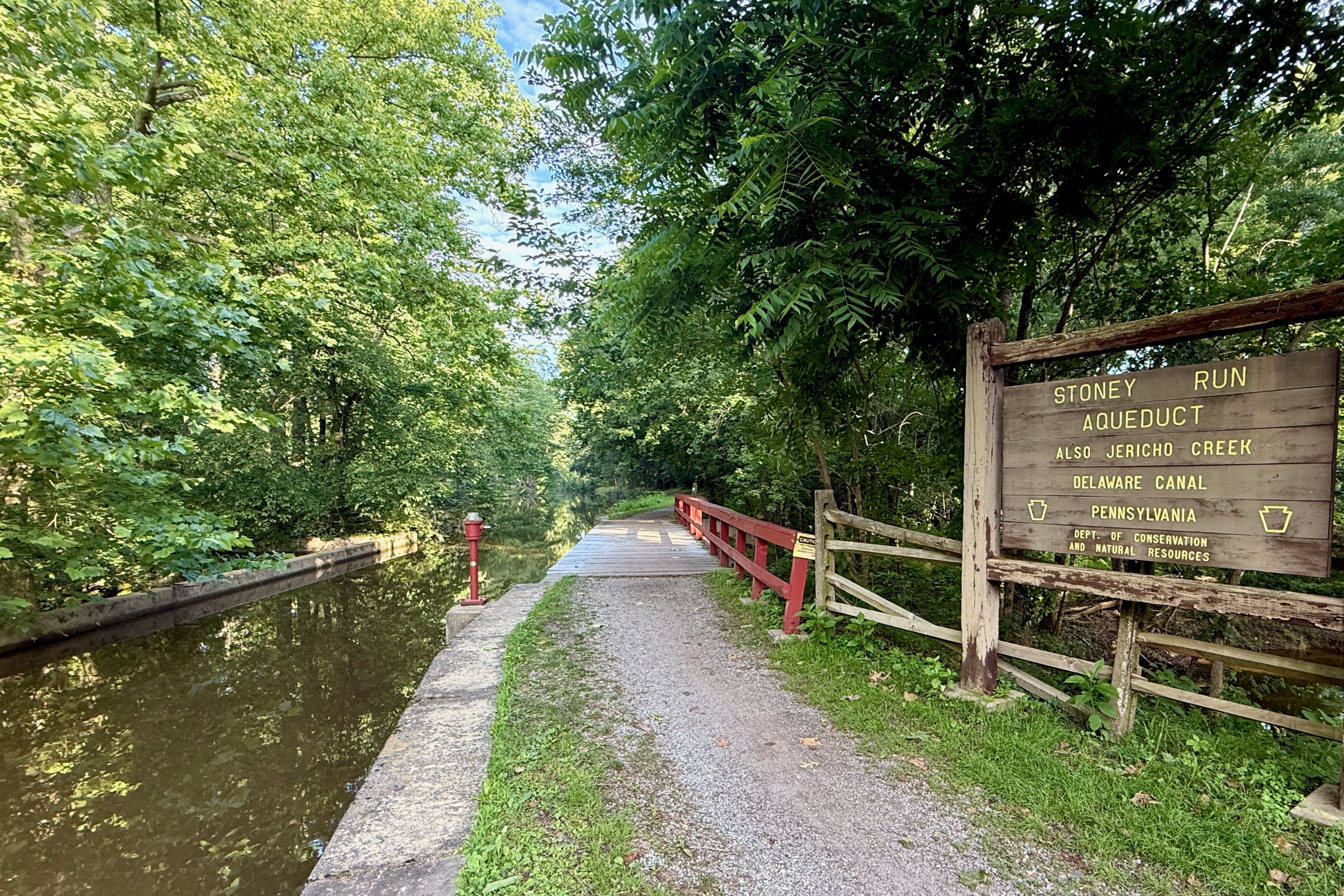
Stoney Run Aqueduct

== See also ==
- List of rivers of Pennsylvania
- List of rivers of the United States
- List of Delaware River tributaries
