= Point Pleasant, Pennsylvania =

Unincorporated community in the U.S. state of Pennsylvania

- Unincorporated community
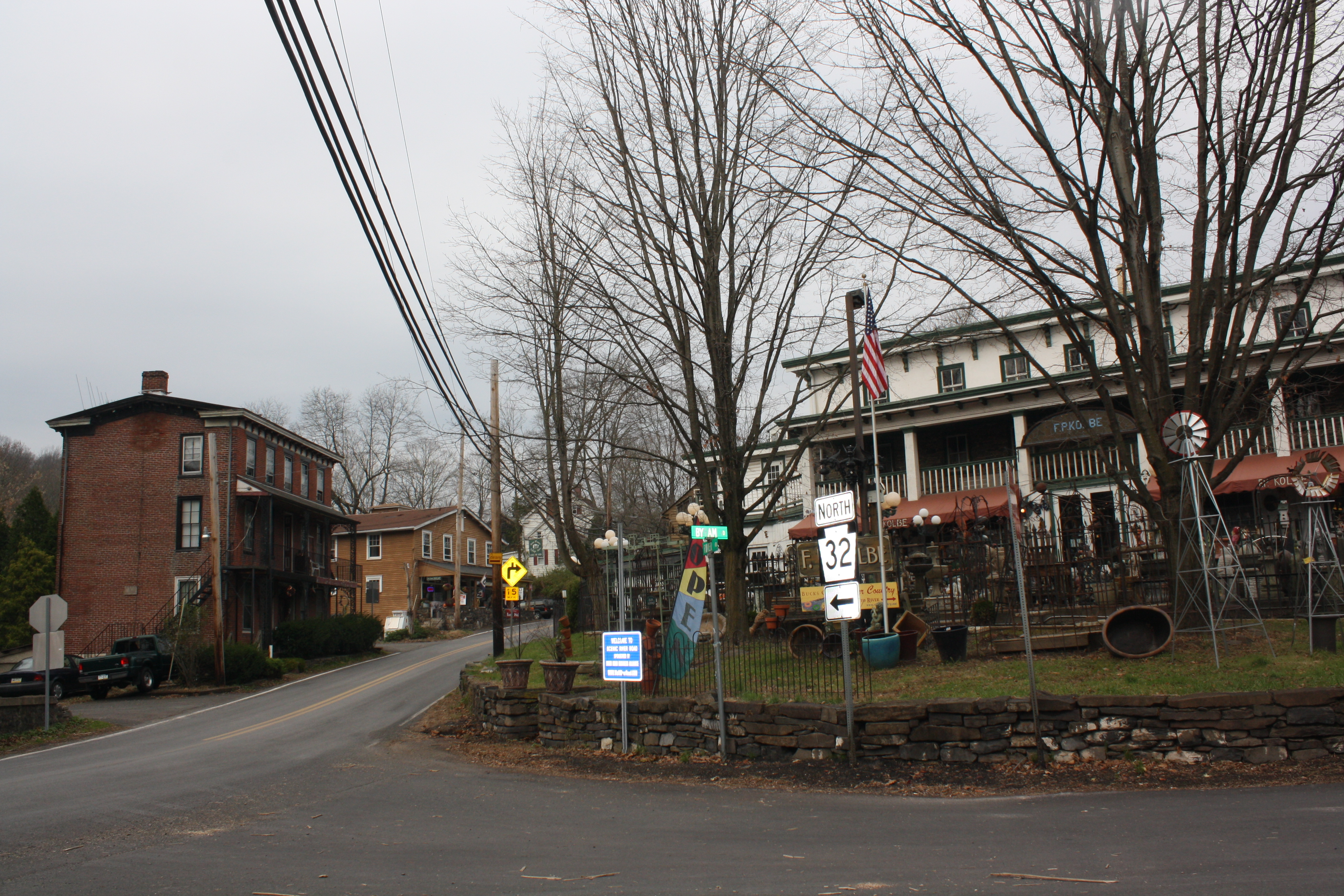
- Point Pleasant Historic District

- Location within Pennsylvania Location within the United States
- Coordinates: 40°25′21″N 75°03′59″W
- Country: United States
- State: Pennsylvania
- County: Bucks
- Township: Plumstead and Tinicum
- Elevation: 98 ft (30 m)
- Time zone: UTC-5 (Eastern (EST))
  - Summer (DST): UTC-4 (EDT)
- ZIP code: 18950
- Area codes: 215, 267 and 445
- GNIS feature ID: 1204432

Point Pleasant is an unincorporated community in Tinicum and Plumstead Townships of Bucks County, Pennsylvania, United States. It lies on both sides of Tohickon Creek by the creek's confluence with the Delaware River; the creek is the dividing line between the townships. The ZIP code for the post office in Point Pleasant is 18950.

== History ==
The area was originally settled by the Lenape Indians who fished in the Delaware River. Its proximity to the river led to the development of grist mills. Grain for the soldiers during the Revolutionary War was ground here. In later years, Point Pleasant was a resting spot for canalmen along the Delaware Division of the Pennsylvania Canal, and a waystation for the Doylestown-Frenchtown-New York stage.

The Bridge in Tinicum Township, Cabin Run Covered Bridge, Frankenfield Covered Bridge, and Point Pleasant Historic District are listed on the National Register of Historic Places.

== Water Pump ==
Point Pleasant is the location of a major water pump installation on the Delaware River, since 1989. This water supplies the Bradshaw Reservoir and Lake Galena Reservoir for Montgomery County and Bucks County drinking water. Water is pumped into the North Branch Neshaminy Creek. Major consumers of water include PECO Energy Company, the North Wales Water Authority, and the North Penn Water Authority.

== Transportation ==
Aside from being located along the Delaware River, Point Pleasant lies along Pennsylvania Route 32, which connects it to New Hope to the south.
