= Erwinna, Pennsylvania =

Unincorporated community in Pennsylvania, US

- Unincorporated community
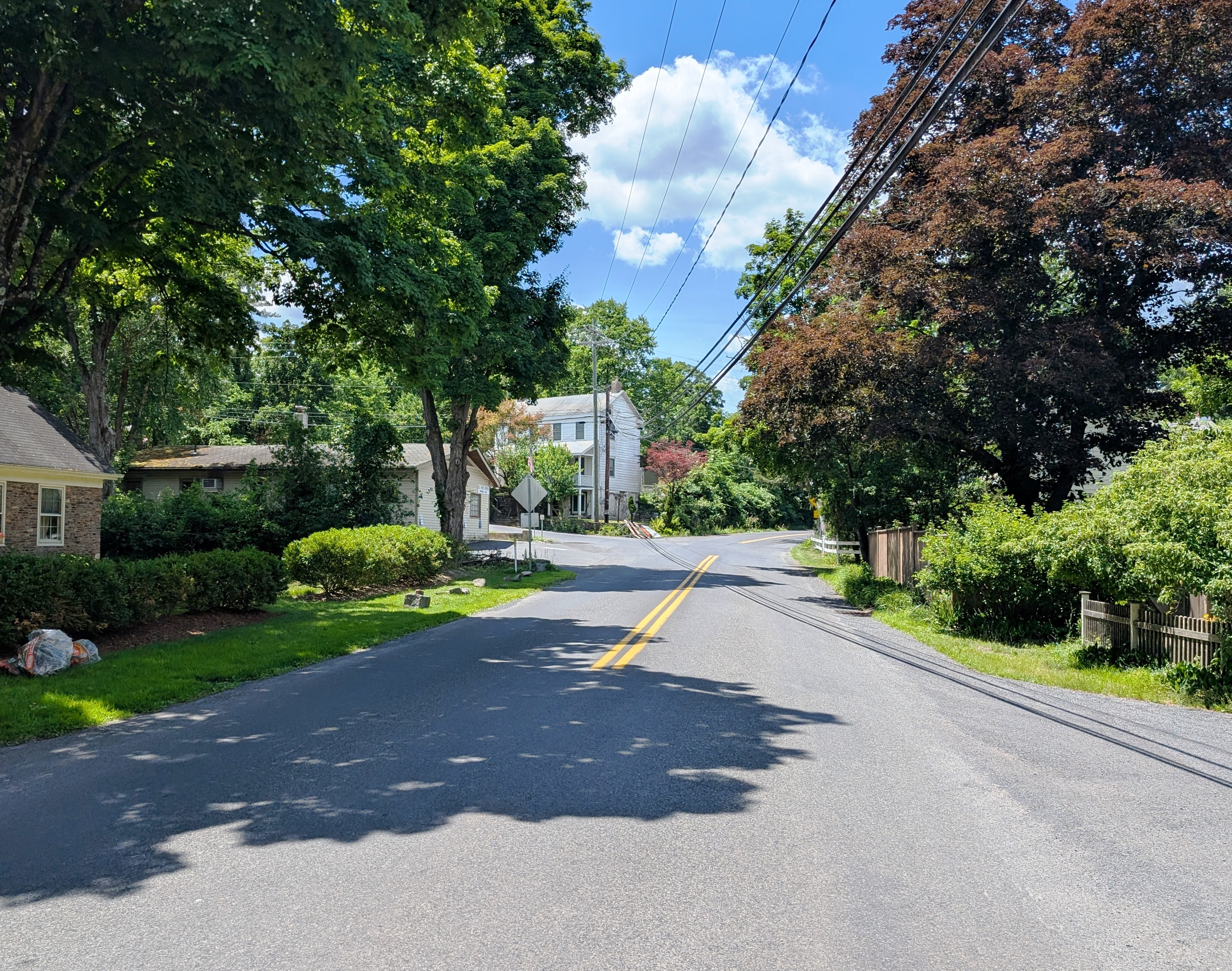
- Center of Erwinna

- Location within Pennsylvania
- Coordinates: 40°30′02″N 75°04′22″W
- Country: United States
- State: Pennsylvania
- County: Bucks
- Township: Tinicum
- Elevation: 135 ft (41 m)
- Time zone: UTC-5 (Eastern (EST))
  - Summer (DST): UTC-4 (EDT)
- ZIP code: 18920
- Area codes: 610 and 484
- GNIS feature ID: 1174314

Erwinna (/ɜːrˈwɪnə/ ur-WIN-ə) is an unincorporated community in Tinicum Township in Bucks County, Pennsylvania. It is located approximately 40 miles (64 km) north as the crow flies of Center City Philadelphia and approximately 70 miles (110 km) west of New York City. It has an area code of 610 and is located along the Delaware Canal State Park. Its Zip Code is 18920.

== History ==
It is named after Colonel Arthur Erwin (also "Irwin"), who was a leader in the Bucks County Militia. A concise biography of him has been created by the DAR Chapter bearing his name. Colonel Erwin is said to have supplied many of the boats which were used by George Washington and the Continental Army to cross the Delaware River en route to the Battle of Trenton on the morning of December 26, 1776.

The Erwinna Covered Bridge, Riverside Farm, Stover Mill, and Isaac Stover House are listed on the National Register of Historic Places.

There is also a two-story, one-room schoolhouse in Erwinna, which was active from 1861 to 1957.
