= Ottsville, Pennsylvania =

Unincorporated community in Pennsylvania, US

- Unincorporated community
- Location within Pennsylvania
- Coordinates: 40°28′23″N 75°09′40″W
- Country: United States
- State: Pennsylvania
- County: Bucks
- Township: Tinicum, Nockamixon
- Elevation: 400 ft (120 m)
- Time zone: UTC-5 (Eastern (EST))
  - Summer (DST): UTC-4 (EDT)
- ZIP Code: 18942
- Area codes: 610 and 484
- GNIS feature ID: 1183094

Ottsville is an unincorporated community in Tinicum Township, Bucks County, Pennsylvania, United States, with parts of the community located in neighboring Nockamixon Township. Ottsville is located at the intersection of Creamery Road/Geigel Hill Road and Durham Road, north a short distance east of Pennsylvania Route 611.

== Education ==
Residents of Ottsville are part of the Palisades School District or the Pennridge School District.
