= Tinicum Township, Bucks County, Pennsylvania =

Township in Pennsylvania, US

Tinicum Township, Pennsylvania
- Township
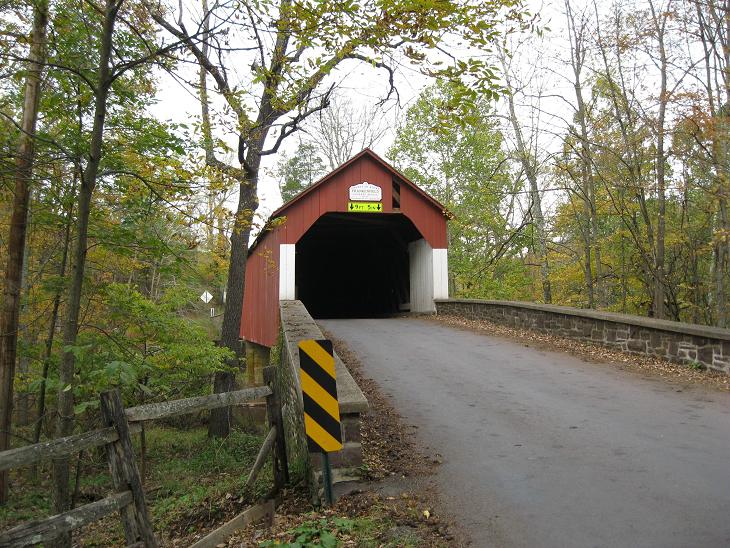
- Frankenfield Covered Bridge

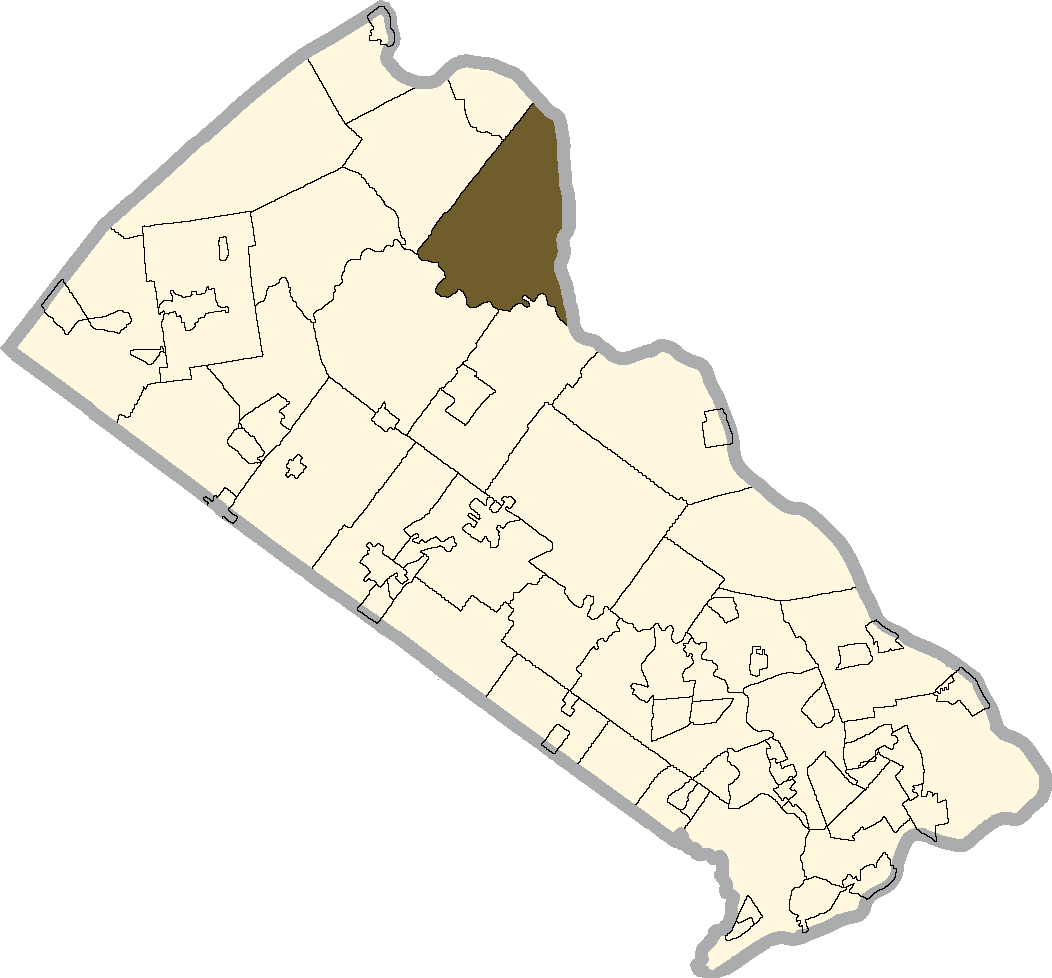
- Location of Tinicum Township in Bucks County

- Location of Tinicum Township in Pennsylvania Tinicum Township (the United States)
- Coordinates: 40°28′57″N 75°06′25″W
- Country: United States
- State: Pennsylvania
- County: Bucks

Area
  - Total: 31.03 sq mi (80.4 km^{2})
  - Land: 30.07 sq mi (77.9 km^{2})
  - Water: 0.95 sq mi (2.5 km^{2})
- Elevation: 531 ft (162 m)

Population (2010)
  - Total: 3,995
  - Estimate (2016): 3,944
  - Density: 132.9/sq mi (51.30/km^{2})
- Time zone: UTC-5 (EST)
  - Summer (DST): UTC-4 (EDT)
- Postal code: 18972 - Upper Black Eddy; 18920 - Erwinna; 18947 - Pipersville; 18950 - Point Pleasant; 18942 - Ottsville
- Area codes: 215, 267, 445, 610, 484
- GNIS feature ID: 1216032
- Website: tinicumtownship.org

Tinicum Township is a township in Bucks County, Pennsylvania, United States. The population was 3,995 at the 2010 census.

The Uhlerstown-Frenchtown Bridge, a free Delaware River Joint Toll Bridge Commission bridge over the Delaware River, connects Uhlerstown to Frenchtown in Hunterdon County, New Jersey. It is located approximately 36 miles north of Center City, Philadelphia and 61 miles west of downtown New York City.

This township includes both area codes 215/267/445 and 610/484. The township also has five different ZIP codes.

== History ==
The Red Hill Church and School, Ridge Valley Rural Historic District, and Lewis Summers Farm are listed on the National Register of Historic Places.

== Geography ==
According to the United States Census Bureau, the township has a total area of 31.2 square miles (80.8 km^{2}), of which 30.2 square miles (78.2 km^{2}) is land and 1.0 square mile (2.5 km^{2}) (3.11%) is water. Tohickon Creek flows along its southern boundary into the Delaware River, which separates the township from New Jersey. Its past and present villages include Bunker Hill, Clay Ridge, Erwinna, Jugtown, Lodi, Ottsville (also in Nockamixon Township), Point Pleasant (also in Plumstead Township), Ridge, Sundale, Smithtown, Tinicum, Uhlerstown, Upper Black Eddy (also in Bridgeton Township), and Wormansville.

Natural features include Haycock Creek, Roaring Rocks, Swamp Creek, Tinicum Creek, and Tohickon Creek.

=== Neighboring municipalities ===
- Plumstead Township (south)
- Bedminster Township (southwest)
- Nockamixon Township (northwest)
- Bridgeton Township (north)
- Holland Township, New Jersey (northeast)
- Milford, New Jersey (east)
- Alexandria Township, New Jersey (east)
- Frenchtown, New Jersey (east)
- Kingwood Township, New Jersey (east)

== Demographics ==
Historical population
Census	Pop.	Note	%±
1930	1,330		—
1940	1,390		4.5%
1950	1,552		11.7%
1960	1,746		12.5%
1970	2,672		53.0%
1980	3,533		32.2%
1990	4,167		17.9%
2000	4,206		0.9%
2010	3,995		−5.0%
2020	3,818		−4.4%

As of the census of 2000, there were 4,206 people, 1,674 households, and 1,173 families residing in the township. The population density was 139.3 inhabitants per square mile (53.8/km^{2}). There were 1,834 housing units at an average density of 60.7 per square mile (23.4/km^{2}). The racial makeup of the township was 97.24% White, 0.76% African American, 0.17% Native American, 0.40% Asian, 0.05% Pacific Islander, 0.50% from other races, and 0.88% from two or more races. Hispanic or Latino of any race were 1.36% of the population.

There were 1,674 households, out of which 27.0% had children under the age of 18 living with them, 62.4% were married couples living together, 5.1% had a female householder with no husband present, and 29.9% were non-families. 22.6% of all households were made up of individuals, and 8.2% had someone living alone who was 65 years of age or older. The average household size was 2.49 and the average family size was 2.94.

In the township the population was spread out, with 21.0% under the age of 18, 5.2% from 18 to 24, 28.6% from 25 to 44, 31.2% from 45 to 64, and 13.9% who were 65 years of age or older. The median age was 42 years. For every 100 females, there were 108.5 males. For every 100 females age 18 and over, there were 104.9 males.

The median income for a household in the township was $60,843, and the median income for a family was $66,375. Males had a median income of $44,886 versus $33,333 for females. The per capita income for the township was $34,321. About 0.5% of families and 2.4% of the population were below the poverty line, including none of those under age 18 and 9.5% of those age 65 or over.

== Climate ==
According to the Köppen climate classification system, Tinicum Township, Pennsylvania has a hot-summer, wet all year, humid continental climate (Dfa). Dfa climates are characterized by at least one month having an average mean temperature ≤ 32.0 °F (≤ 0.0 °C), at least four months with an average mean temperature ≥ 50.0 °F (≥ 10.0 °C), at least one month with an average mean temperature ≥ 71.6 °F (≥ 22.0 °C), and no significant precipitation difference between seasons. During the summer months, episodes of extreme heat and humidity can occur with heat index values ≥ 100 °F (≥ 38 °C). On average, the wettest month of the year is July which corresponds with the annual peak in thunderstorm activity. During the winter months, episodes of extreme cold and wind can occur with wind chill values < 0 °F (< -18 °C). The plant hardiness zone is 6b with an average annual extreme minimum air temperature of -1.9 °F (-18.8 °C). The average seasonal (Nov-Apr) snowfall total is between 30 and 36 inches (76 and 91 cm), and the average snowiest month is February which corresponds with the annual peak in nor'easter activity.

Climate data for Tinicum Township, Bucks County, Pennsylvania (1981 – 2010 averages)
Month	Jan	Feb	Mar	Apr	May	Jun	Jul	Aug	Sep	Oct	Nov	Dec	Year
Mean daily maximum °F (°C)	38.1 (3.4)	41.6 (5.3)	50.1 (10.1)	62.3 (16.8)	72.3 (22.4)	80.8 (27.1)	85.0 (29.4)	83.2 (28.4)	76.4 (24.7)	64.9 (18.3)	54.0 (12.2)	42.5 (5.8)	62.7 (17.1)
Daily mean °F (°C)	29.3 (−1.5)	32.1 (0.1)	39.8 (4.3)	50.8 (10.4)	60.5 (15.8)	69.6 (20.9)	74.1 (23.4)	72.4 (22.4)	65.1 (18.4)	53.6 (12.0)	44.0 (6.7)	34.0 (1.1)	52.2 (11.2)
Mean daily minimum °F (°C)	20.5 (−6.4)	22.6 (−5.2)	29.5 (−1.4)	39.2 (4.0)	48.7 (9.3)	58.3 (14.6)	63.2 (17.3)	61.6 (16.4)	53.9 (12.2)	42.3 (5.7)	34.0 (1.1)	25.5 (−3.6)	41.7 (5.4)
Average precipitation inches (mm)	3.49 (89)	2.82 (72)	3.82 (97)	4.13 (105)	4.27 (108)	4.34 (110)	5.01 (127)	4.06 (103)	4.43 (113)	4.39 (112)	3.75 (95)	4.08 (104)	48.59 (1,234)
Average relative humidity (%)	67.9	64.0	59.4	58.1	62.7	68.3	68.3	71.3	72.1	70.7	69.0	69.3	66.8
Average dew point °F (°C)	20.0 (−6.7)	21.3 (−5.9)	26.8 (−2.9)	36.6 (2.6)	47.7 (8.7)	58.7 (14.8)	63.0 (17.2)	62.6 (17.0)	55.9 (13.3)	44.3 (6.8)	34.5 (1.4)	25.0 (−3.9)	41.5 (5.3)
Source: PRISM Climate Group

== Transportation ==
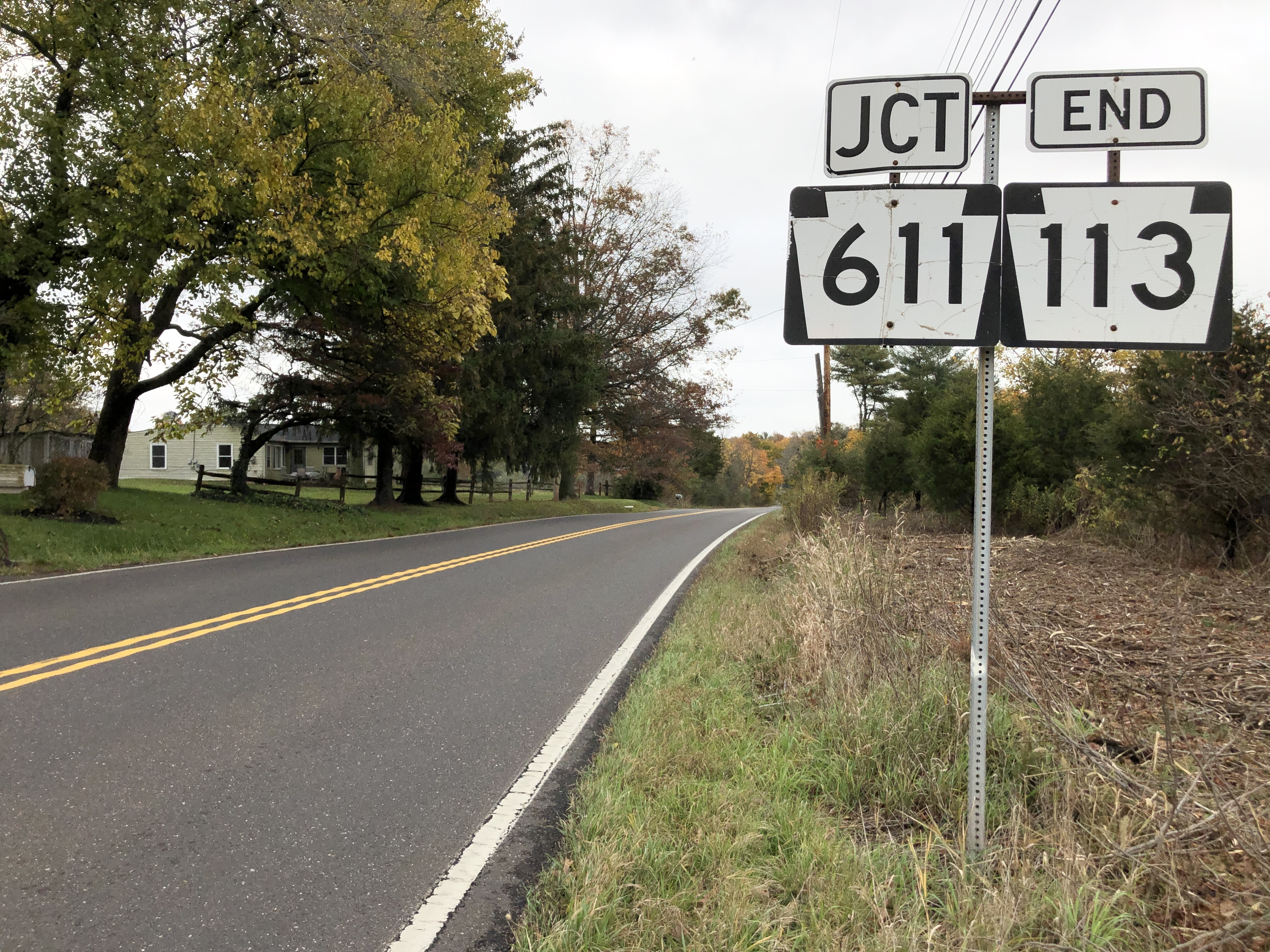
PA 113 approaching its northern terminus at PA 611 in Tinicum Township

As of 2018 there were 102.49 miles (164.94 km) of public roads in Tinicum Township, of which 40.30 miles (64.86 km) were maintained by the Pennsylvania Department of Transportation (PennDOT) and 62.19 miles (100.09 km) were maintained by the township.

Numbered highways serving Tinicum Township include Pennsylvania Route 32, Pennsylvania Route 113 and Pennsylvania Route 611. PA 32 follows River Road along a north-south alignment across the eastern edge of the township, parallel to the Delaware River. PA 113 enters the southwestern corner of the township along Bedminster Road before quickly terminating at PA 611, which follows a north-south alignment across the southwestern section of the township via Easton Road.

== Ecology ==
According to the A. W. Kuchler U.S. potential natural vegetation types, Tinicum Township, Pennsylvania would have an Appalachian Oak (104) vegetation type with an Eastern Hardwood Forest (25) vegetation form.

== See also ==
- Point Pleasant, Pennsylvania
- Pennsylvania Canal (Delaware Division)
- Erwinna, Pennsylvania
