= Pennsylvania Route 563 =

State highway in Pennsylvania, US

Pennsylvania Route 563

Route information
- Maintained by PennDOT
- Length: 21.151 mi (34.039 km)
- Existed: 1928–present

Major junctions
- South end: PA 63 in Upper Salford Township
- PA 313 in East Rockhill Township
- North end: PA 412 in Nockamixon Township

Location
- Country: United States
- State: Pennsylvania
- Counties: Montgomery, Bucks

Highway system
- Pennsylvania State Route System; Interstate; US; State; Scenic; Legislative
← PA 562	→ PA 564

Pennsylvania Route 563 (PA 563) is a state highway in the U.S. state of Pennsylvania. The route runs 21.15 mi (34.04 km) from PA 63 in Upper Salford Township in Montgomery County northeast to PA 412 in Nockamixon Township in Bucks County. Along the way, the route passes through the northern part of Perkasie and forms a concurrency with PA 313 in East Rockhill Township. North of here, PA 563 runs through Nockamixon State Park, heading to the northwest of Lake Nockamixon.

PA 563 was first created in 1928 to connect Bergey to Harrow, following its current alignment to PA 313 before continuing straight along Ridge Road and continuing to PA 412. By 1940, construction of the road into a state highway was completed. In the early 1970s, PA 563 was moved to its current alignment north of PA 313 as a result of the creation of Lake Nockamixon, which severed the original alignment.

== Route description ==
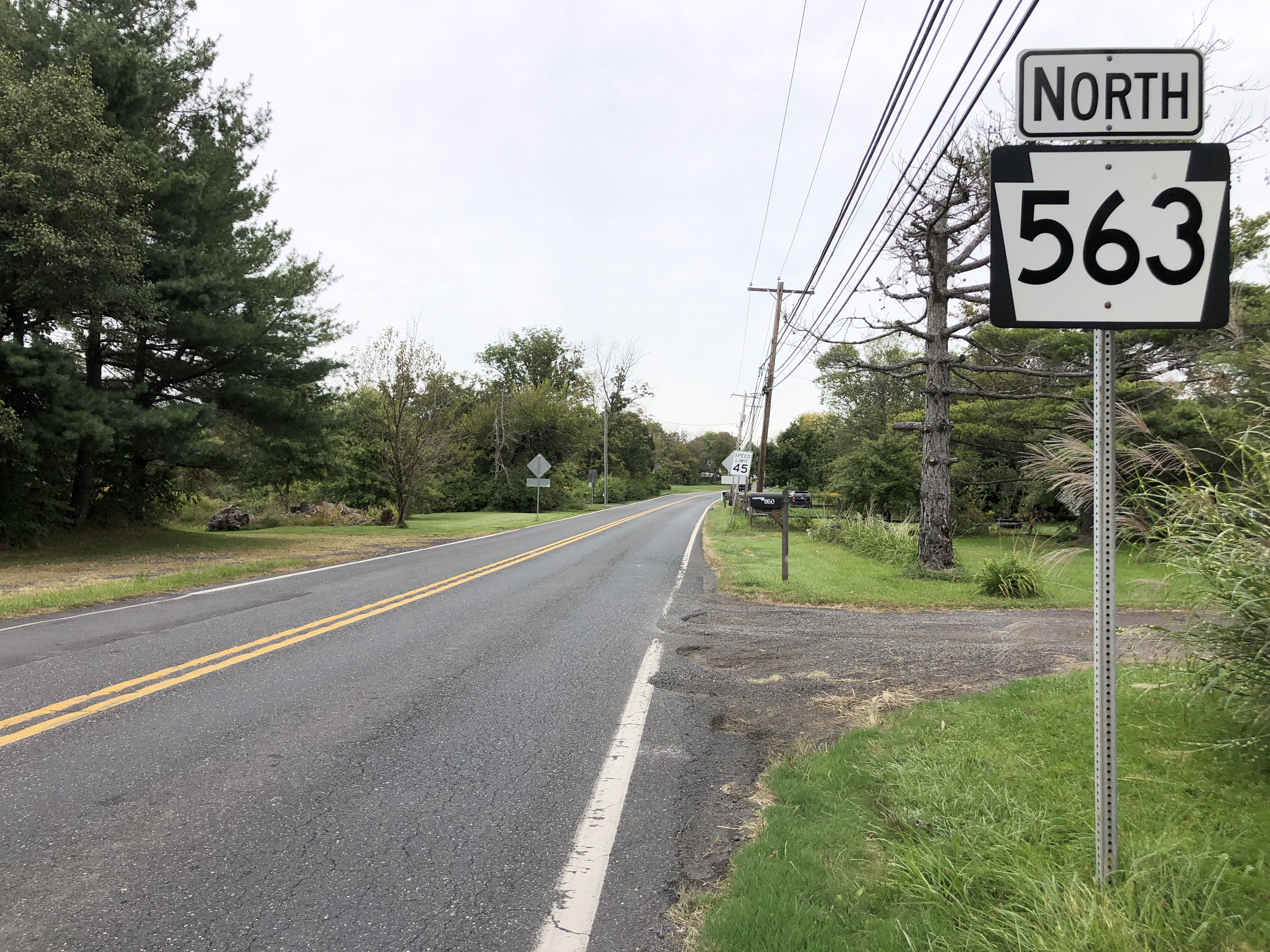
PA 563 northbound in Salford Township

PA 563 begins at an intersection with PA 63 in Upper Salford Township, Montgomery County and heads in an easterly direction on two-lane, undivided Ridge Road. The route passes through wooded areas with some homes, turning southeast at the Township Line Road intersection and forming the border between Salford Township to the northeast and Upper Salford Township to the southwest. PA 563 makes a northeast turn at the Barndt Road–Moyer Road junction, continuing along Ridge Road into Salford Township.

The road passes over the Pennsylvania Turnpike Northeast Extension (Interstate 476) and PA 563 turns east and heads into the community of Tylersport, where it crosses Allentown Road. After leaving Tylersport, the route heads northeast into more rural areas.

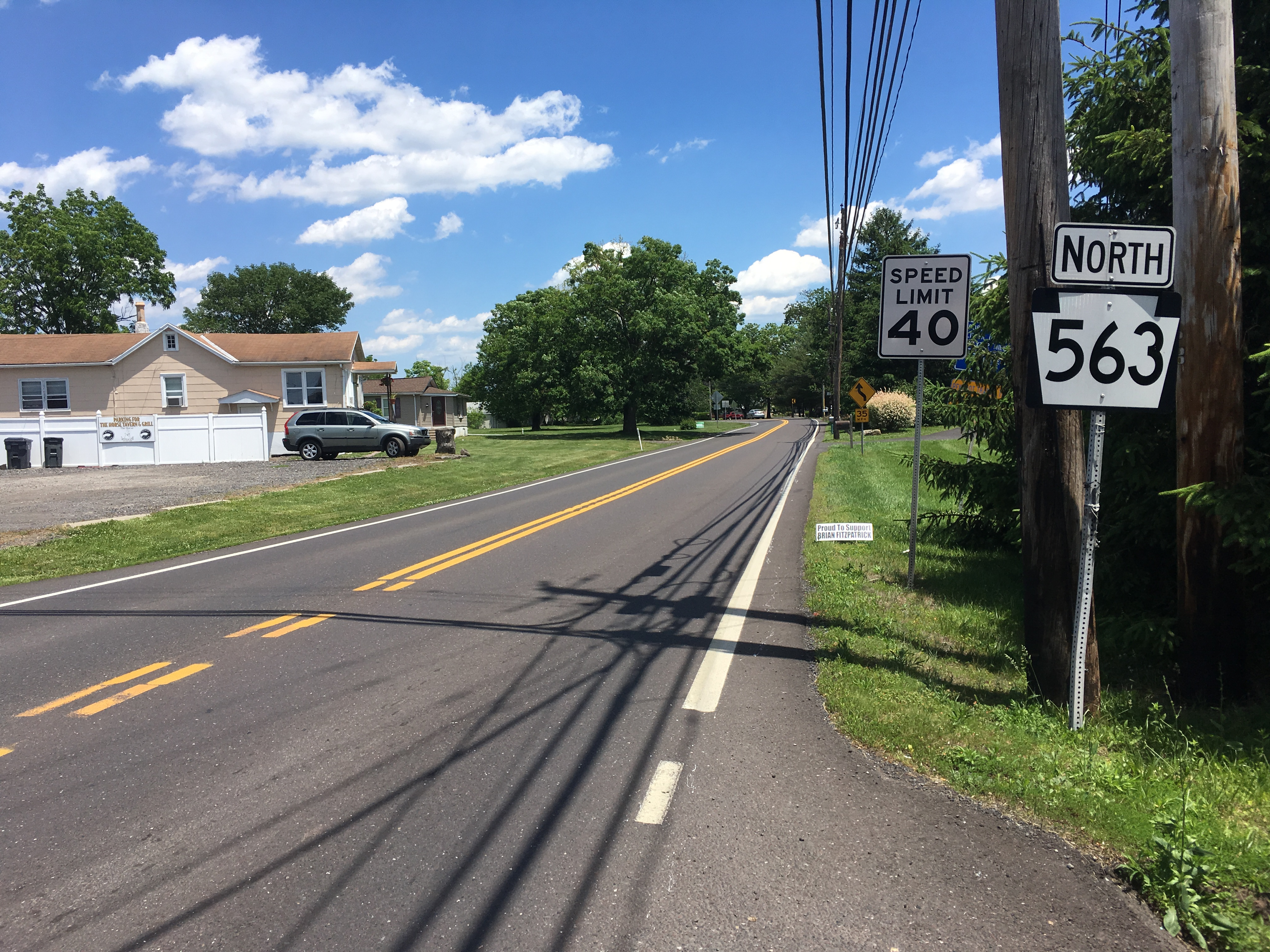
PA 563 northbound in East Rockhill Township

Upon crossing County Line Road in the community of Naceville, PA 563 enters West Rockhill Township in Bucks County and heads into a mix of farms and woods. After running to the southeast of James Memorial Park and passing through the community of Almont, the route intersects Lawn Avenue, which provides access to the PA 309 freeway at a diamond interchange. PA 563 passes over PA 309 a short distance after this intersection. The route continues east-northeast and crosses Bethlehem Pike and Old Bethlehem Pike in a commercial area in the community of White Horse. At the intersection with the latter, the road crosses into East Rockhill Township before it enters the borough of Perkasie and passes near residential neighborhoods, running along the top of a ridge. Farther to the northeast, PA 563 passes to the southeast of Pennridge Airport. At this point, the road continues into East Rockhill Township and heads through a mix of farmland, woodland, and a few residences.

PA 563 comes to an intersection with PA 313, where it turns northwest to form a concurrency with that route on Dublin Pike, with Ridge Road continuing northeast. The two routes head through more rural land, crossing Threemile Run, before PA 563 splits from PA 313 by turning northeast onto Mountain View Drive. Along this road, the route heads into forested areas with occasional homes and enters Nockamixon State Park, a park which contains Lake Nockamixon. Upon crossing the Tohickon Creek, the road continues into Haycock Township. In this area, PA 563 skirts along the northwest edge of the state park. A short distance following the Deerwood Lane intersection, the road passes the main entrance to the park. PA 563 heads through the community of Haycock Run and crosses an arm of the lake formed by Haycock Creek into Nockamixon Township. In this township, the route leaves the state park and passes through rural areas before ending at PA 412.

== History ==
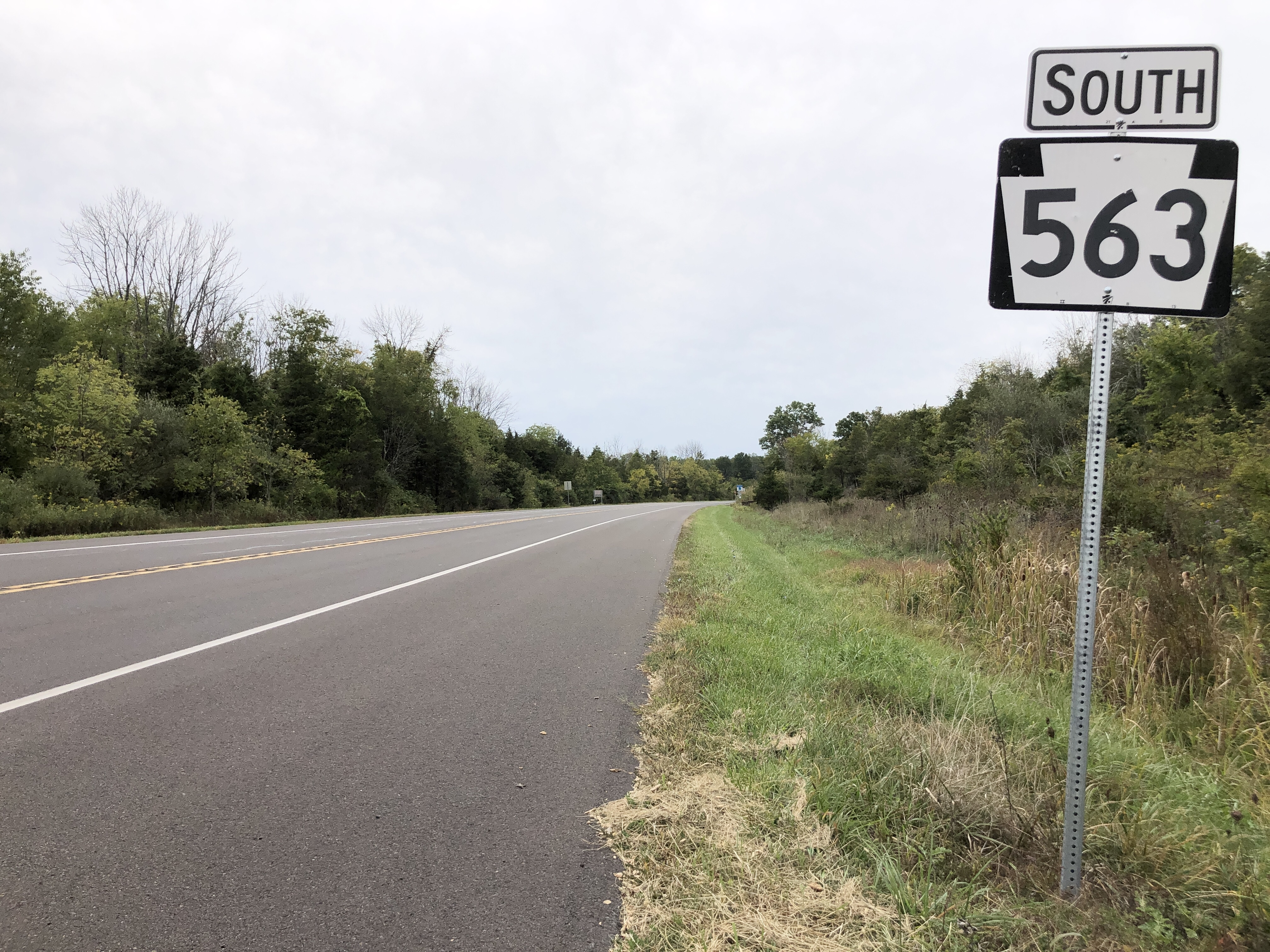
PA 563 southbound in Nockamixon State Park in Haycock Township

When Pennsylvania first legislated routes in 1911, present-day PA 563 was not given a number. In 1928, PA 563 was designated to run from PA 63 near Bergey northeast to PA 412 near Harrow, following its current alignment south of PA 313. From this point, it continued northeast on Ridge Road, passing near Weisel and eventually continuing northeast to Harrow. At this time, the route was unpaved. By 1930, the route was paved south of PA 313. At this time, the sections of the route between Tylersport and southwest of Perkasie and north of PA 313 were under construction as state highways. All of PA 563 was completed by 1940.

In the 1960s, construction began to create Lake Nockamixon along the Tohickon Creek near PA 563 in northern Bucks County. The Secretary of the Pennsylvania Department of Forests and Waters, Maurice K. Goddard, proposed the lake as part of a goal for every Pennsylvania resident to be within 25 miles (40 km) of a state park. Lake Nockamixon was intended to fill a gap in between the Philadelphia and Lehigh Valley areas. As a result of building the dam and creating the lake, the northernmost portion of PA 563 had to be relocated to a new alignment to the north of the planned lake as it would sever a portion of the route north of Kellers Church. Between 1970 and 1972, construction took place on the new alignment of the route. As a result, PA 563 was routed to follow PA 313 to get from Ridge Road to its new alignment.

== Major intersections ==
County	Location	mi	km	Destinations	Notes
Montgomery	Upper Salford Township	0.000	0.000	PA 63 (Sumneytown Pike) – Harleysville, Green Lane	Southern terminus
Bucks	West Rockhill Township	7.335	11.805	To PA 309 – Quakertown, Montgomeryville	Access via Lawn Avenue
Bucks	East Rockhill Township	12.207	19.645	PA 313 east (Dublin Pike) – Dublin	Southern end of PA 313 concurrency
Bucks	East Rockhill Township	13.459	21.660	PA 313 west (Dublin Pike) – Quakertown	Northern end of PA 313 concurrency
Bucks	Nockamixon Township	21.151	34.039	PA 412 (Durham Road) to PA 611 – Springtown, Harrow	Northern terminus
1.000 mi = 1.609 km; 1.000 km = 0.621 mi: Concurrency terminus
