= Threemile Run (Tohickon Creek tributary) =

Threemile Run Three Mile Run
- Threemile Run

Location
- Country: United States
- State: Pennsylvania
- County: Bucks
- Township: West Rockhill, East Rockhill

Physical characteristics
- Source
  - coordinates: 40°22′19″N 75°19′59″W
  - elevation: 500 feet (150 m)
- Mouth
  - coordinates: 40°25′14″N 75°16′1″W
  - elevation: 394 feet (120 m)
- Length: 5.57 miles (8.96 km)
- Basin size: 8.11 square miles (21.0 km^{2})

Basin features
- Progression: Threemile Run → Lake Nockamixon → Tohickon Creek → Delaware River → Delaware Bay
- River system: Delaware River
- Waterbodies: Lake Nockamixon
- Bridges: Forrest Road; Old Mill Road; South Bethlehem Pike (South West End Boulevard); Hill Road; Stone Edge Road; North Rockhill Road; West Rock Road; Pennsylvania Route 313 (Doylestown Pike, Dublin Pike)

Threemile Run (Three Mile Run) is a tributary of the Tohickon Creek in Bucks County, Pennsylvania in the United States and is part of the Delaware River watershed.

== History ==
Threemile Run was named so long before it was so noted in John Scully's map of the Province of Pennsylvania in 1770. It flows in the first valley north of the East Branch Perkiomen Creek and powered several grist mills in its early days.

== Statistics ==
Threemile Run's GNIS identification number is 1189555, its Pennsylvania Department of Conservation and Natural Resources identification number is 03168. The stream drains 8.11 square miles (21.0 km^{2}) and reaches its confluence at the Tohickon Creek's 17.60 river mile within the banks of Lake Nockamixon.

== Course ==
Threemile Run rises in West Rockhill Township, Bucks County, Pennsylvania, from an unnamed pond at an elevation of 500 feet (150 m) next to Catch Basin Road and flows southeast, south, then southeast and meets a tributary from the right bank, then turns right to flow northeast. Threemile drained into the Tohickon Creek before the Tohickon was dammed in 1972 to form Lake Nockamixon. After the lake was formed, it drains into the lake about ¾ mile from the Tohickon at an elevation of 394 feet (120 m), resulting in an average slope of 19.03 feet per mile (3.35 meters per kilometer).

== Geology ==
- Appalachian Highlands Division
  - Piedmont Province
    - Gettysburg-Newark Lowland Section
      - Brunswick Formation
      - Diabase

The Brunswick Formation is a sedimentary layer of rock consisting of mudstone, siltstone, and beds of green, brown, and red-brown shale. Mineralogy consists of argillite and hornfels. About 200 million years ago, magma intruded into the Brunswick and cooled quickly forming a fine grained diabase consisting of primarily labradorite and augite. Haycock Mountain (on the right bank of the creek) and several other features in the area are remnants of the intrusion after the Brunswick has eroded away over time. The first mile or so of Threemile Run's course is located in a region of diabase rock which intruded into the local sedimentary layers of the Brunswick Formation during the Jurassic and the Triassic, then the remaining course flows over the Brunswick Formation.

== Crossings and Bridges ==
Crossing	NBI Number	Length	Lanes	Spans	Material/Design	Built	Reconstructed	Latitude	Longitude
Pennsylvania Route 313 (Doylestown Pike, Dublin Pike)	6993	12.2 metres (40 ft)	2		Concrete Arch-Deck	1930		40°24'56	75°16'14"W
West Rock Road	7516	24 metres (79 ft)	2	1	Prestressed concrete box beam or girders-multiple	1979		40°24'7.1"N	75°17'1.06"W
North Rockhill Road									
Stone Edge Road									
Hill Road	7519	12 metres (39 ft)	2	1	Concrete Tee Beam	1930		40°23'8"N	75°18'27"W
South Old Bethlehem Pike (Park Avenue)	7502	9 metres (30 ft)	2	1	Prestressed concrete box beam or girders - Multiple	1955		40°22'57.3"N	75°18'45"W
South Bethlehem Pike (South West End Boulevard)	7385	6.7 metres (22 ft)			Concrete Tee Beam, concrete cast-in-place deck, bituminous surface	1936		40°22'50"N	75°19'W
Old Mill Road (Township Road T360)	7513	9 metres (30 ft)	1	1	Continuous concrete stringer/multi-beam or girder	1930		40°22'46.9"N	75°19'10.2"W
Forrest Road									
