= Tohickon =

Tohickon may refer to:

- Tohickon Creek
- Tohickon Middle School
- Tohickon, Pennsylvania
- Tohickon State Park
