= West Rockhill Township, Pennsylvania =

Township in Pennsylvania, US

West Rockhill Township
- Township
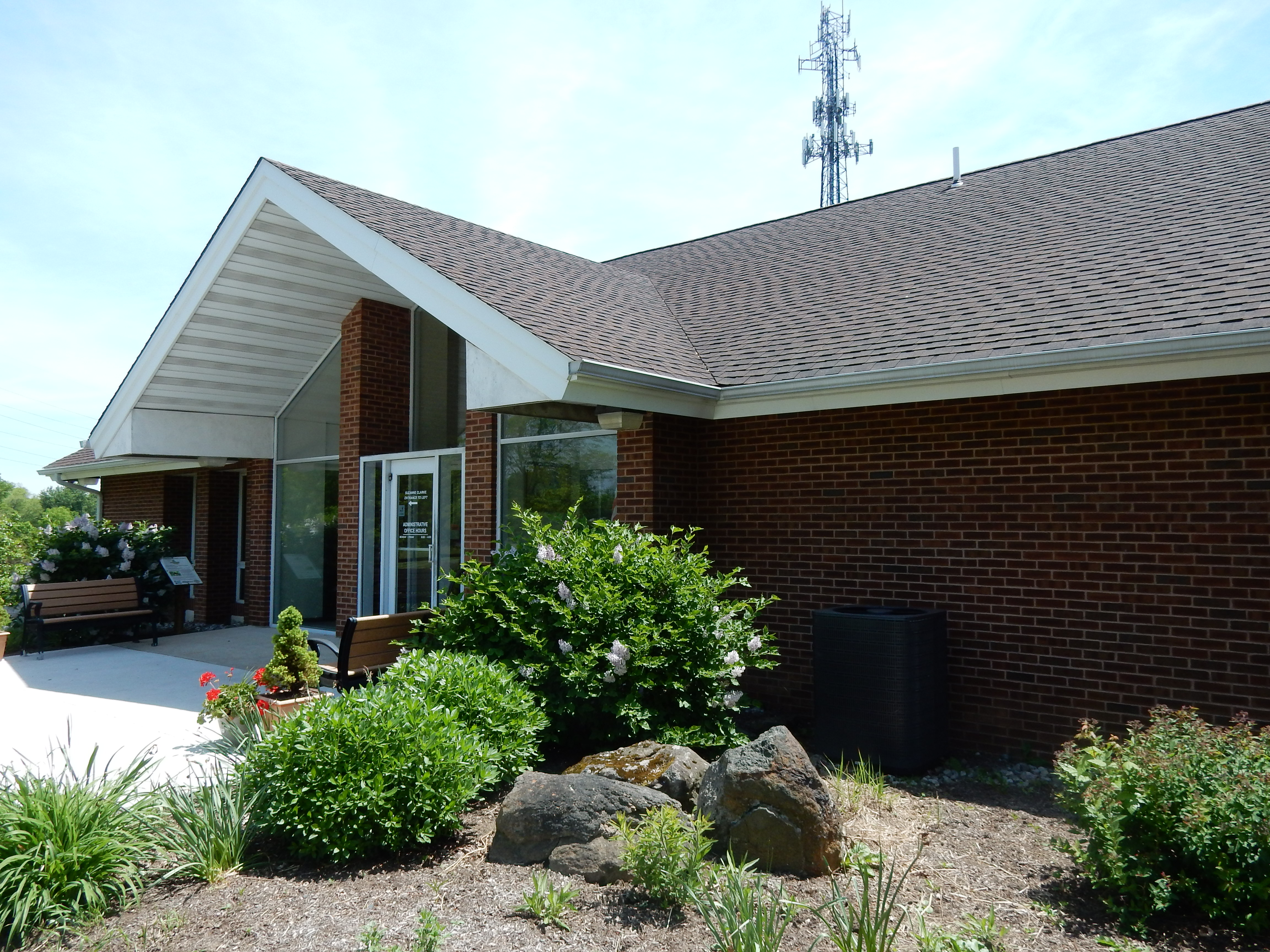
- Township Municipal Offices

- Seal

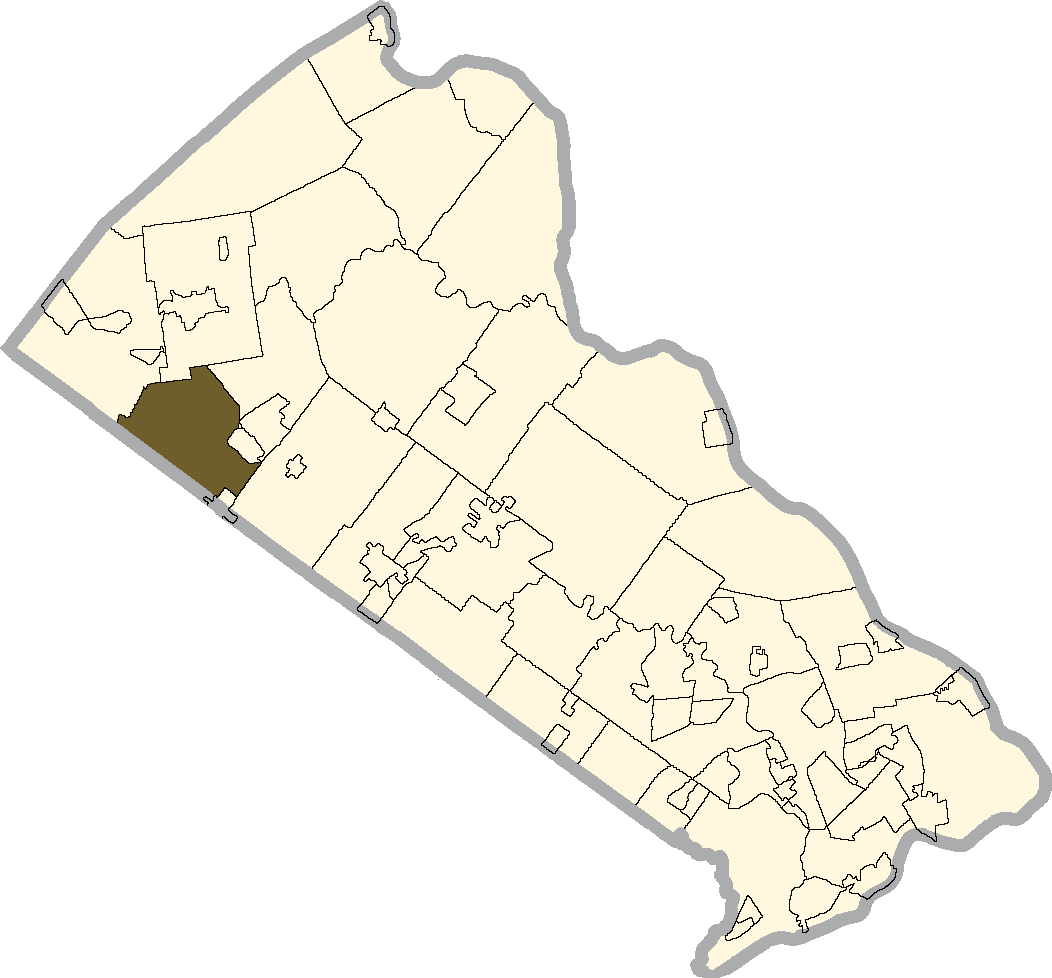
- Location of West Rockhill Township in Bucks County

- Location in Pennsylvania and the United States West Rockhill Township (the United States)
- Coordinates: 40°22′20″N 75°22′59″W
- Country: United States
- State: Pennsylvania
- County: Bucks

Area
  - Total: 16.43 sq mi (42.6 km^{2})
  - Land: 16.28 sq mi (42.2 km^{2})
  - Water: 0.15 sq mi (0.39 km^{2})
- Elevation: 489 ft (149 m)

Population (2010)
  - Total: 5,256
  - Estimate (2016): 5,248
  - Density: 322.9/sq mi (124.7/km^{2})
- Time zone: UTC-5 (EST)
  - Summer (DST): UTC-4 (EDT)
- Area codes: 215, 267 and 445
- FIPS code: 42-017-83960
- Website: www.westrockhilltownship.org

West Rockhill Township is a township in Bucks County, Pennsylvania, United States. The original Rockhill Township was established in 1740 and was divided into East Rockhill and West Rockhill Townships in 1890. The population was 5,256 at the 2010 census. West Rockhill Township is part of Pennridge School District.

== Geography ==
According to the United States Census Bureau, the township has a total area of 16.4 square miles (42.4 km^{2}), of which 16.3 square miles (42.2 km^{2}) is land and 0.1 square mile (0.2 km^{2}) (0.49%) is water. It is in the Delaware watershed and, while most of West Rockhill is drained by the East Branch Perkiomen Creek and Unami Creek into the Perkiomen Creek and Schuylkill River, an area in the northeast portion drains via Threemile Run, Lake Nockamixon, and the Tohickon Creek eastward to the Delaware River. Other natural features include Butter Creek, Ingram Hill, Mill Creek, Ridge Valley Creek, and Rock Hill. The township's villages include Almont, Argus, Derstein, Knockthopher, Naceville (also in Montgomery County,) Rich Hill, Ridge Valley, Rocky Ridge, Smoketown (also in East Rockhill,) and White Horse.

=== Adjacent municipalities ===
- Milford Township (northwest)
- Richland Township (north)
- East Rockhill Township (northeast)
- Perkasie (east)
- Sellersville (east)
- Hilltown Township (southeast)
- Telford (south)
- Franconia Township, Montgomery County (south)
- Salford Township, Montgomery County (southwest)
- Marlborough Township, Montgomery County (west)

== Demographics ==
Historical population
Census	Pop.	Note	%±
1930	1,390		—
1940	1,645		18.3%
1950	2,020		22.8%
1960	2,484		23.0%
1970	3,270		31.6%
1980	3,776		15.5%
1990	4,518		19.7%
2000	4,233		−6.3%
2010	5,256		24.2%
2020	5,439		3.5%

As of the 2010 census, the township was 95.0% White, 1.1% Black or African American, 0.2% Native American, 1.4% Asian, and 0.9% were two or more races. 1.4% of the population were of Hispanic or Latino ancestry.

As of the census of 2000, there were 4,233 people, 1,636 households, and 1,146 families residing in the township. The population density was 259.7 inhabitants per square mile (100.3/km^{2}). There were 1,701 housing units at an average density of 104.4 per square mile (40.3/km^{2}). The racial makeup of the township was 98.23% White, 0.54% African American, 0.14% Native American, 0.47% Asian, 0.14% from other races, and 0.47% from two or more races. Hispanic or Latino of any race were 0.59% of the population.

There were 1,636 households, out of which 26.2% had children under the age of 18 living with them, 60.3% were married couples living together, 6.1% had a female householder with no husband present, and 29.9% were non-families. 25.7% of all households were made up of individuals, and 15.8% had someone living alone who was 65 years of age or older. The average household size was 2.47 and the average family size was 2.97.

In the township the population was spread out, with 20.9% under the age of 18, 6.5% from 18 to 24, 25.9% from 25 to 44, 25.3% from 45 to 64, and 21.3% who were 65 years of age or older. The median age was 43 years. For every 100 females, there were 94.0 males. For every 100 females age 18 and over, there were 92.3 males.

The median income for a household in the township was $50,948, and the median income for a family was $63,871. Males had a median income of $44,063 versus $30,306 for females. The per capita income for the township was $25,026. About 1.7% of families and 4.7% of the population were below the poverty line, including none of those under age 18 and 11.0% of those age 65 or over.

== Climate ==
According to the Köppen climate classification system, West Rockhill Township, Pennsylvania has a hot-summer, wet all year, humid continental climate (Dfa). Dfa climates are characterized by at least one month having an average mean temperature ≤ 32.0 °F (≤ 0.0 °C), at least four months with an average mean temperature ≥ 50.0 °F (≥ 10.0 °C), at least one month with an average mean temperature ≥ 71.6 °F (≥ 22.0 °C), and no significant precipitation difference between seasons. During the summer months, episodes of extreme heat and humidity can occur with heat index values ≥ 100 °F (≥ 38 °C). On average, the wettest month of the year is July which corresponds with the annual peak in thunderstorm activity. During the winter months, episodes of extreme cold and wind can occur with wind chill values < 0 °F (< -18 °C). The plant hardiness zone is 6b with an average annual extreme minimum air temperature of -1.6 °F (-18.7 °C). The average seasonal (Nov-Apr) snowfall total is between 30 and 36 inches (76 and 91 cm), and the average snowiest month is February which corresponds with the annual peak in nor'easter activity.

Climate data for West Rockhill Township, Bucks County, Pennsylvania (1981 – 2010 averages)
Month	Jan	Feb	Mar	Apr	May	Jun	Jul	Aug	Sep	Oct	Nov	Dec	Year
Mean daily maximum °F (°C)	37.9 (3.3)	41.2 (5.1)	49.6 (9.8)	61.8 (16.6)	71.9 (22.2)	80.5 (26.9)	84.5 (29.2)	82.9 (28.3)	76.0 (24.4)	64.4 (18.0)	53.4 (11.9)	42.0 (5.6)	62.3 (16.8)
Daily mean °F (°C)	29.2 (−1.6)	31.9 (−0.1)	39.6 (4.2)	50.5 (10.3)	60.3 (15.7)	69.3 (20.7)	73.8 (23.2)	72.2 (22.3)	64.8 (18.2)	53.2 (11.8)	43.5 (6.4)	33.6 (0.9)	51.9 (11.1)
Mean daily minimum °F (°C)	20.6 (−6.3)	22.6 (−5.2)	29.5 (−1.4)	39.1 (3.9)	48.6 (9.2)	58.2 (14.6)	63.0 (17.2)	61.5 (16.4)	53.6 (12.0)	42.0 (5.6)	33.6 (0.9)	25.2 (−3.8)	41.5 (5.3)
Average precipitation inches (mm)	3.46 (88)	2.84 (72)	3.84 (98)	4.09 (104)	4.34 (110)	4.37 (111)	4.76 (121)	3.88 (99)	4.57 (116)	4.32 (110)	3.74 (95)	3.96 (101)	48.17 (1,224)
Average relative humidity (%)	68.7	65.4	60.9	59.5	63.6	69.5	69.3	72.1	72.9	71.4	70.7	70.7	67.9
Average dew point °F (°C)	20.2 (−6.6)	21.6 (−5.8)	27.2 (−2.7)	36.9 (2.7)	47.9 (8.8)	58.9 (14.9)	63.1 (17.3)	62.7 (17.1)	55.9 (13.3)	44.2 (6.8)	34.6 (1.4)	25.1 (−3.8)	41.6 (5.3)
Source: PRISM Climate Group

== Transportation ==
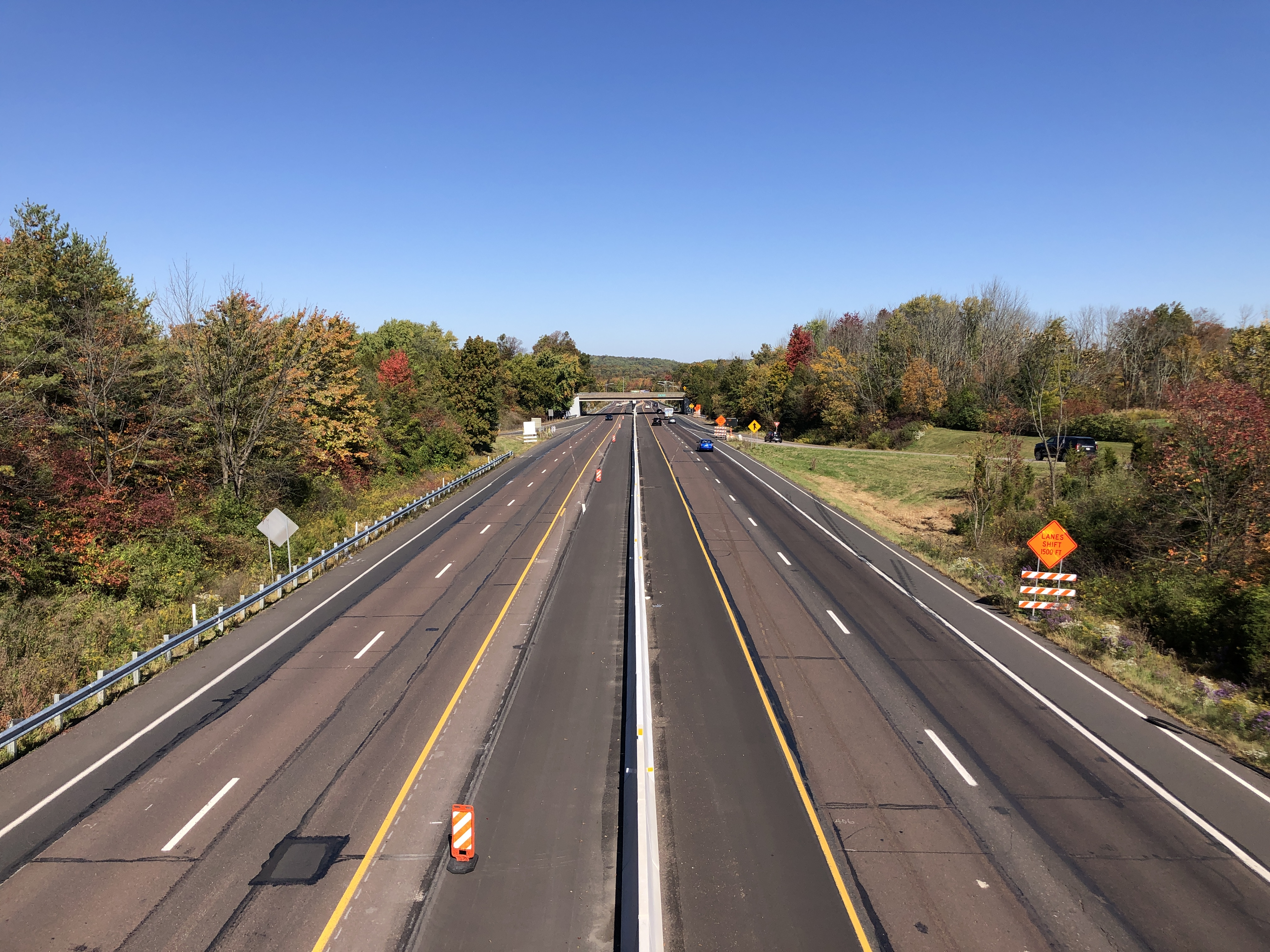
PA 309 northbound in West Rockhill Township

As of 2018 there were 67.71 miles (108.97 km) of public roads in West Rockhill Township, of which 0.40 miles (0.64 km) were maintained by the Pennsylvania Turnpike Commission (PTC), 26.80 miles (43.13 km) were maintained by the Pennsylvania Department of Transportation (PennDOT) and 40.61 miles (65.36 km) were maintained by the township.

Pennsylvania Route 309 is the main highway serving West Rockhill Township. It follows the Sellersville Bypass on a southeast–northwest alignment across the eastern portion of the township. Pennsylvania Route 152 reaches its northern terminus at PA 309 in the southeastern portion of the township, from that point heading northeastward out of the township. Pennsylvania Route 563 utilizes Ridge Road as it follows a southwest–northeast alignment across the central portion of the township. A small portion of the Pennsylvania Turnpike Northeast Extension (I-476) traverses the far western tip of the township, but has no interchanges within the township.

The southern tip of West Rockhill Township is served by SEPTA bus Route 132, which runs between the Montgomery Mall and Telford.

== Ecology ==
According to the A. W. Kuchler U.S. potential natural vegetation types, West Rockhill Township, Pennsylvania would have an Appalachian Oak (104) vegetation type with an Eastern Hardwood Forest (25) vegetation form.

== Gallery ==
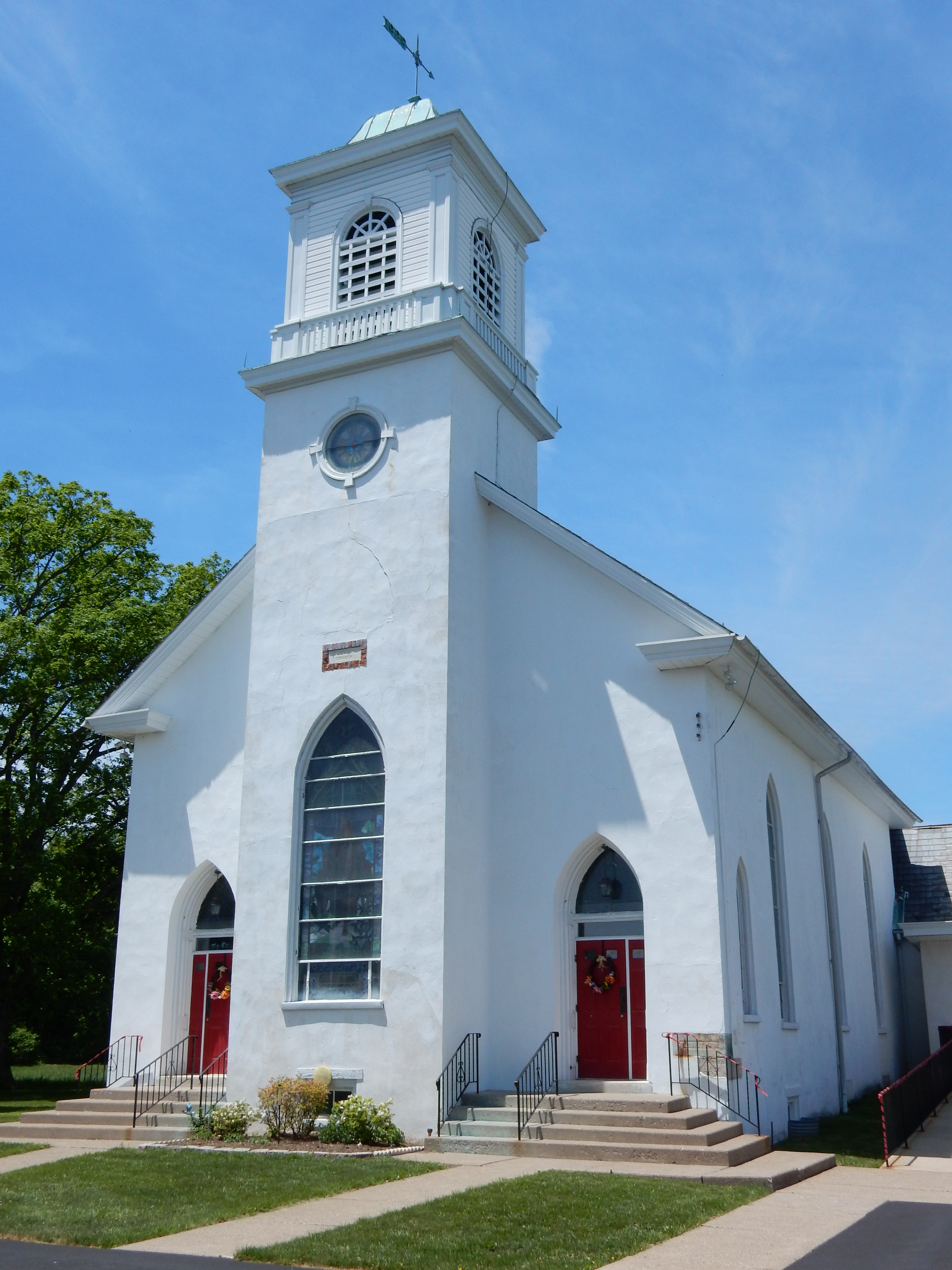
Jerusalem Lutheran Church.

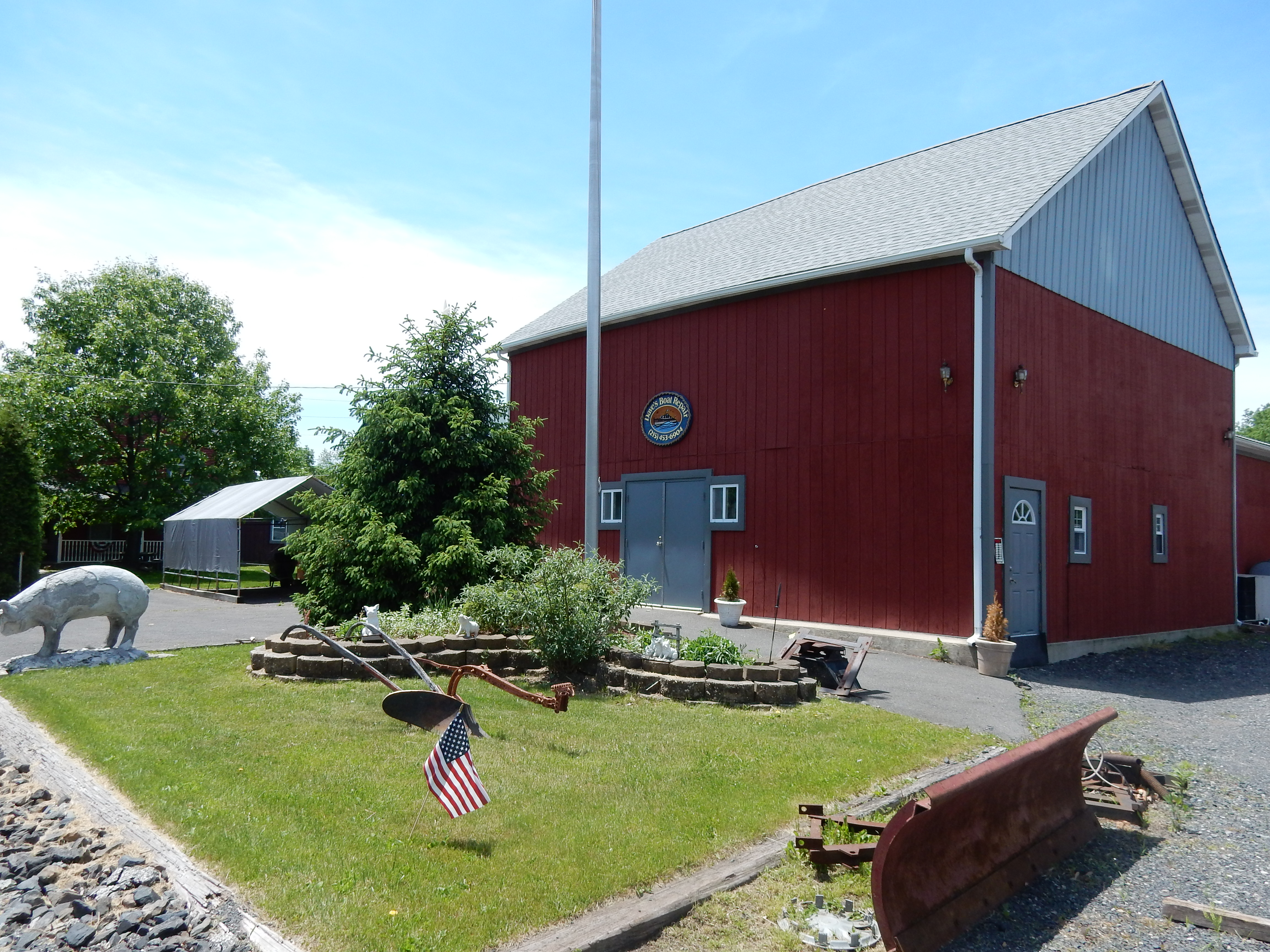
Ridge Rd.

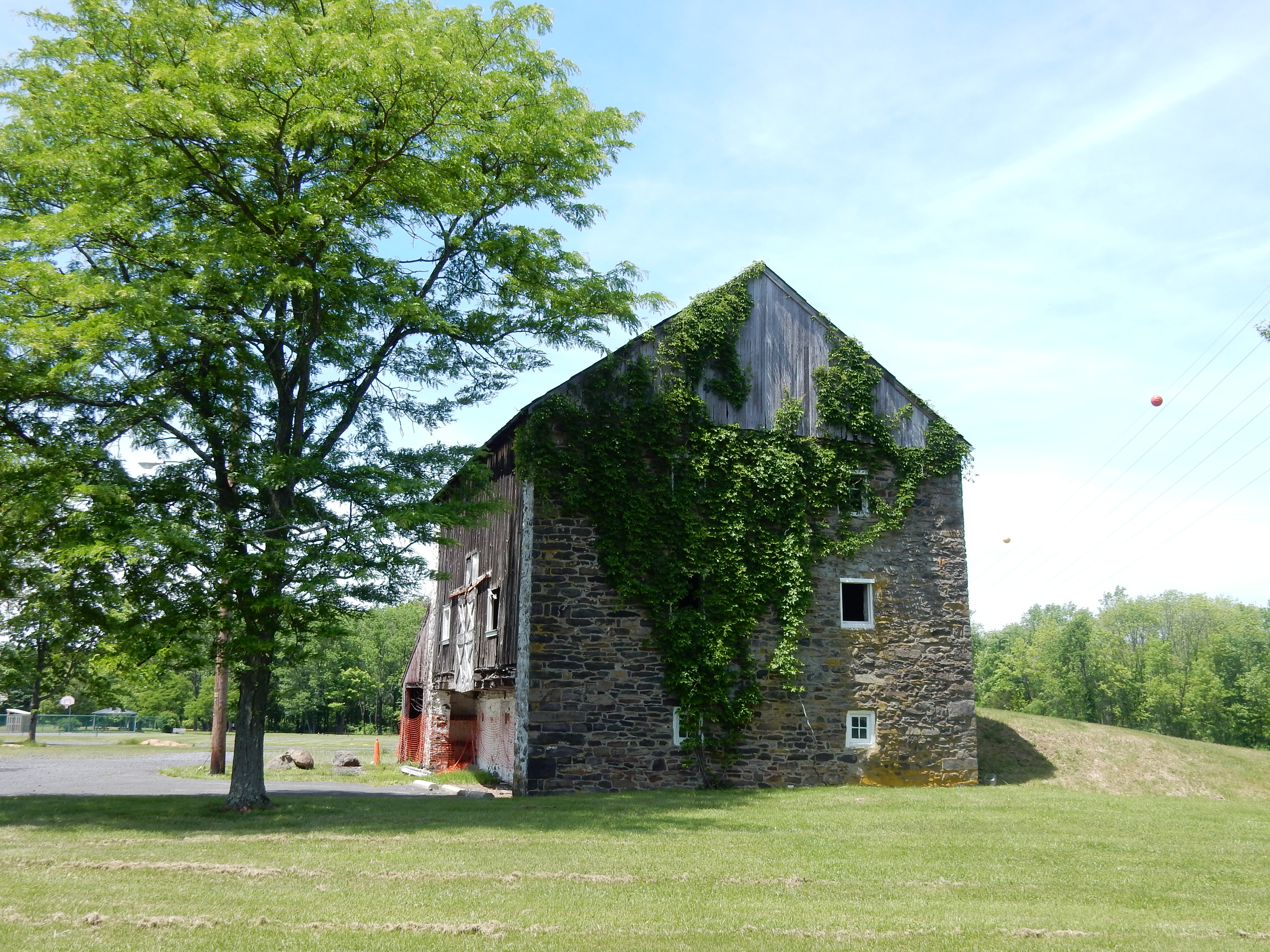
Barn on Ridge Rd.

== See also ==
- Pennridge Regional Police
