= Harrow, Pennsylvania =

Unincorporated community in Pennsylvania, U.S.

Coordinates: 40°29′28″N 75°10′28″W

Harrow is an unincorporated community in Nockamixon Township, Bucks County, Pennsylvania, United States. The community is located just northeast of Lake Nockamixon. It is drained by the Tohickon Creek into the Delaware River. It is served by Routes 412, 563, and 611. It is served by the Kintnersville and Ottsville post offices with the ZIP codes of 18930 and 18942, respectively.

== Notable person ==
- Samuel A. Smith, former U.S. Congressman
