= Geddes Run (Tohickon Creek tributary) =

- Geddes Run

Location
- Country: United States
- State: Pennsylvania
- County: Bucks
- Township: Plumstead

Physical characteristics
- Source
  - coordinates: 40°23′10″N 75°8′24″W
  - elevation: 555 feet (169 m)
- Mouth
  - coordinates: 40°25′23″N 75°3′59″W
  - elevation: 82 feet (25 m)
- Length: 5.21 miles (8.38 km)
- Basin size: 4.94 square miles (12.8 km^{2})

Basin features
- Progression: Geddes Run → Tohickon Creek → Delaware River → Delaware Bay
- River system: Delaware River
- Bridges: Meetinghouse Road; Potters Lane; Belmont Manor Drive; Old Durham Road; Pennsylvania Route 412 (Durham Road); Wismer Road; Groveland Road; Tollgate Road; Tohickon Hill Road
- Slope: 90.79 feet per mile (17.195 m/km)

Geddes Run is a tributary of the Tohickon Creek contained wholly within Plumstead Township, Bucks County, Pennsylvania, in the United States.

== History ==
The first inhabitants of the area of Geddes Run were the Lenape people. Many artifacts have been found, including 'turtlebacks' fashioned by the Lenape people from a quarry in the area of Geddes Run. The region became part of the Walking Purchase of the family of William Penn in 1737.

The nearby 'bluestone' quarry was operated for many years by Nicholas L. Heaney, which supplied thousands of feet of flagstone and curbstone for Doylestown's streets until replaced by concrete.

On 24 August 1891, a storm occurred, which was officially measured in Doylestown at 5.21 inches (13.2 cm) in 24 hours, causing Geddes Run to flood, resulting in severe damage in Point Pleasant, including the destruction of the Solomon Fulmer store and severe damage to the covered bridge over the Tohickon Creek.

== Statistics ==
Geddes Run is 5.21 miles (8.38 km) long, and a watershed of 4.94 square miles (12.8 km^{2}), part of the Delaware River watershed. It rises at an elevation of 555 feet (169 m) and its mouth elevation is 82 feet (25 m), resulting in an average slope of 90.79 feet per mile (17.195 m/km). The GNIS I.D. number is 1175497, the U.S. Department of the Interior Geological Survey code number is 03111. Geddes Run meets its confluence at the Tohickon Creek's 0.30 river mile.

== Course ==
Geddes Run is northeast oriented for about half its length, then it turns to the southeast for a short distance then, as it turns back northeast, it picks up an unnamed tributary. It reaches the Tohickon Creek in Pleasant Valley about 1,500 feet (460 m) before the Tohickon flows into the Delaware River.

== Geology ==
- Appalachian Highlands Division
  - Piedmont Province
    - Gettysburg-Newark Lowland Section
      - Lockatong Formation

Geddes Run lies on the Lockatong Formation of rock formed during the Triassic, which consists of argillite, shale, and some impure limestone and calcareous shale.

== Crossings and Bridges ==
Crossing	NBI Number	Length	Lanes	Spans	Material/Design	Built	Reconstructed	Latitude	Longitude
Meetinghouse Road	-	-	-	-	-	-	-	-	
Potters Lane	-	-	-	-	-	-	-	-	
Belmont Manor Drive	-	-	-	-	-	-	-	-	
Old Durham Road	7634	10	1	1	Steel stringer/multi-beam or girder	1950	-	40°24'2.2"N	75°7'16.1"W
Pennsylvania Route 413 (Durham Road)	-	-	-	-	-	-	-	-	
Wismer Road	-	-	-	-	-	-	-	-	
Groveland Road	7548	7	2	1	Continuous concrete stringer/multi-beam or girder	1937	-	40°24'56.7"N	75°5'42.7"W
Tollgate Road	-	-	-	-	-	-	-	-	
Tohickon Hill Road	-	-	-	-	-	-	-	-	

== See also ==
- List of rivers of the United States
- List of rivers of Pennsylvania
- List of Delaware River tributaries
