= Haycock Township, Pennsylvania =

Township in Pennsylvania, US

Haycock Township
- Township
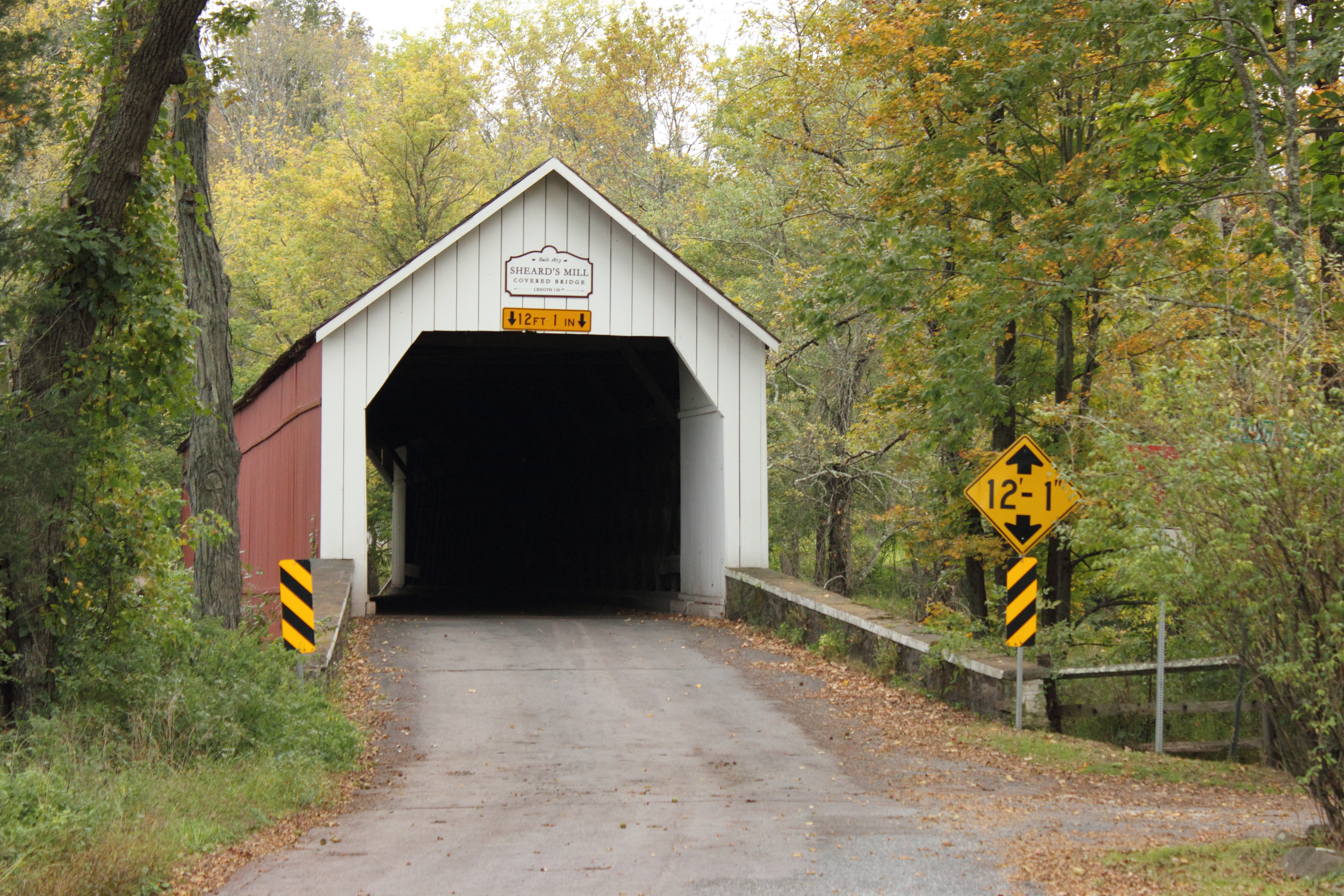
- Sheard's Mill Covered Bridge

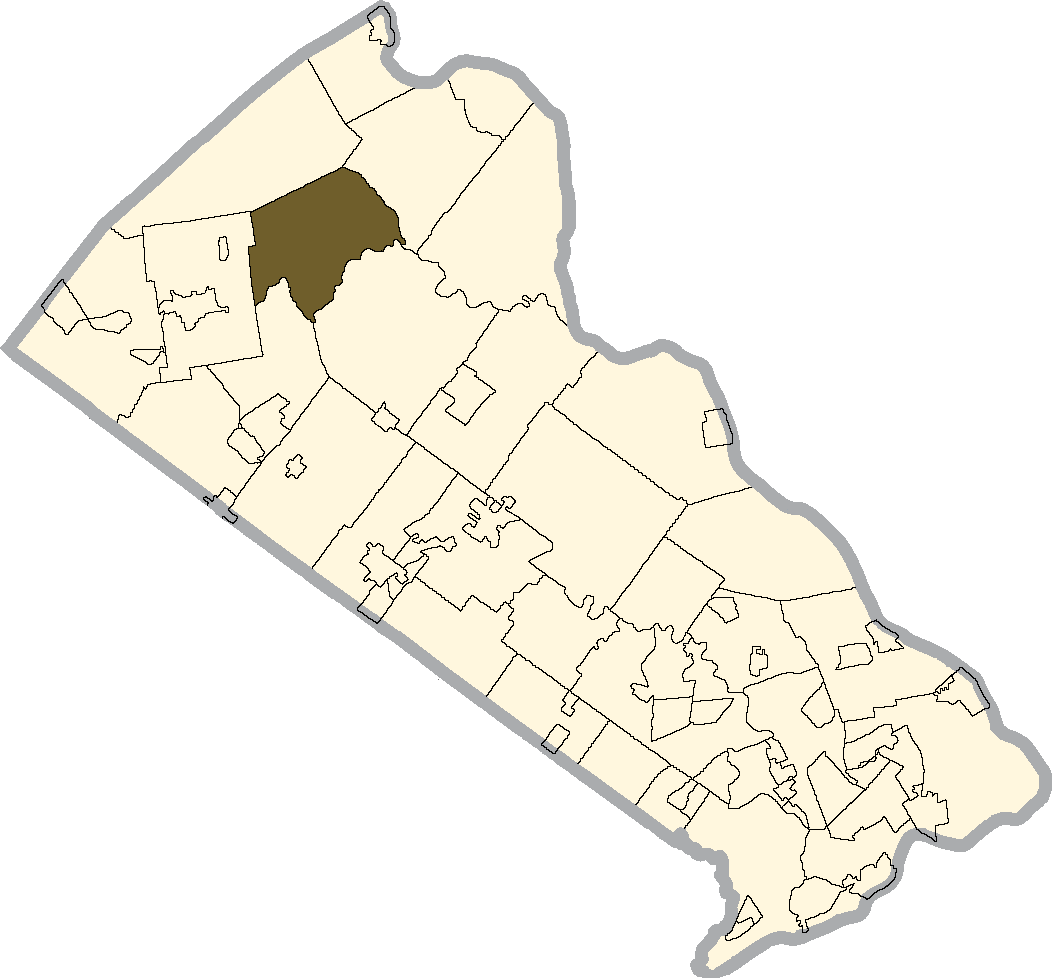
- Location of Haycock Township in Bucks County

- Location in Pennsylvania and the United States Haycock Township (the United States)
- Coordinates: 40°27′00″N 75°14′52″W
- Country: United States
- State: Pennsylvania
- County: Bucks

Area
  - Total: 21.03 sq mi (54.5 km^{2})
  - Land: 19.67 sq mi (50.9 km^{2})
  - Water: 1.36 sq mi (3.5 km^{2})
- Elevation: 502 ft (153 m)

Population (2010)
  - Total: 2,225
  - Estimate (2016): 2,208
  - Density: 113.1/sq mi (43.67/km^{2})
- Time zone: UTC-5 (EST)
  - Summer (DST): UTC-4 (EDT)
- Area codes: 215, 267 and 445
- FIPS code: 42-017-33224
- Website: www.haycocktwp.com

Haycock Township is a township in Bucks County, Pennsylvania, United States. The population was 2,225 at the 2010 census.

== Geography ==
According to the United States Census Bureau, the township has a total area of 21.2 square miles (55 km^{2}), of which 20.1 square miles (52 km^{2}) is land and 1.2 square miles (3.1 km^{2}) (5.55%) is water. It is drained by the Tohickon Creek eastward into the Delaware River. Lake Nockamixon forms much of its southeastern border.

Its villages include Applebachsville, Danneltown, Doanston, Haycock, Pullen (also in Richland and Springfield Townships), Reiffs Corner, Shoupville, Sterners Mill, Strawntown, Thatcher, and Tohickon.

Natural features found in the township include Dimple Creek, Haycock Creek, Haycock Mountain, Kimble Creek, and Tohickon Creek.

=== Neighboring municipalities ===
- Springfield Township (north)
- Nockamixon Township (east)
- Bedminster Township (southeast)
- East Rockhill Township (southwest)
- Richland Township (west)

== Demographics ==
Historical population
Census	Pop.	Note	%±
1930	852		—
1940	864		1.4%
1950	1,084		25.5%
1960	1,273		17.4%
1970	1,260		−1.0%
1980	1,750		38.9%
1990	2,165		23.7%
2000	2,191		1.2%
2010	2,225		1.6%
2020	2,200		−1.1%

As of the 2010 census, the borough was 96.3% White, 1.0% Black or African American, 0.1% Native American, 0.5% Asian, and 1.0% were two or more races. 1.0% of the population were of Hispanic or Latino ancestry.

As of the census of 2000, there were 2,191 people, 805 households, and 618 families residing in the township. The population density was 10.92 people per square mile (4.2/km^{2}). There were 841 housing units at an average density of .419/sq mi (0.162/km^{2}). The racial makeup of the township was 97.99% White, 0.37% African American, 0.09% Native American, 0.91% Asian, 0.23% Pacific Islander, 0.09% from other races, and 0.32% from two or more races. Hispanic or Latino of any race were 0.27% of the population.

There were 805 households, out of which 32.9% had children under the age of 18 living with them, 68.4% were married couples living together, 5.5% had a female householder with no husband present, and 23.2% were non-families. 16.1% of all households were made up of individuals, and 6.2% had someone living alone who was 65 years of age or older. The average household size was 2.71 and the average family size was 3.08.

In the township the population was spread out, with 23.1% under the age of 18, 6.6% from 18 to 24, 29.6% from 25 to 44, 30.6% from 45 to 64, and 10.0% who were 65 years of age or older. The median age was 40 years. For every 100 females there were 106.5 males. For every 100 females age 18 and over, there were 104.6 males.

The median income for a household in the township was $61,061, and the median income for a family was $66,326. Males had a median income of $43,929 versus $27,500 for females. The per capita income for the township was $25,431. About 3.0% of families and 4.3% of the population were below the poverty line, including 10.6% of those under age 18 and none of those age 65 or over.

== Emergency Services ==
Haycock Township is served by the Pennsylvania State Police, the Haycock Fire Co. No. 1, and Upper Bucks Regional EMS.

== Transportation ==
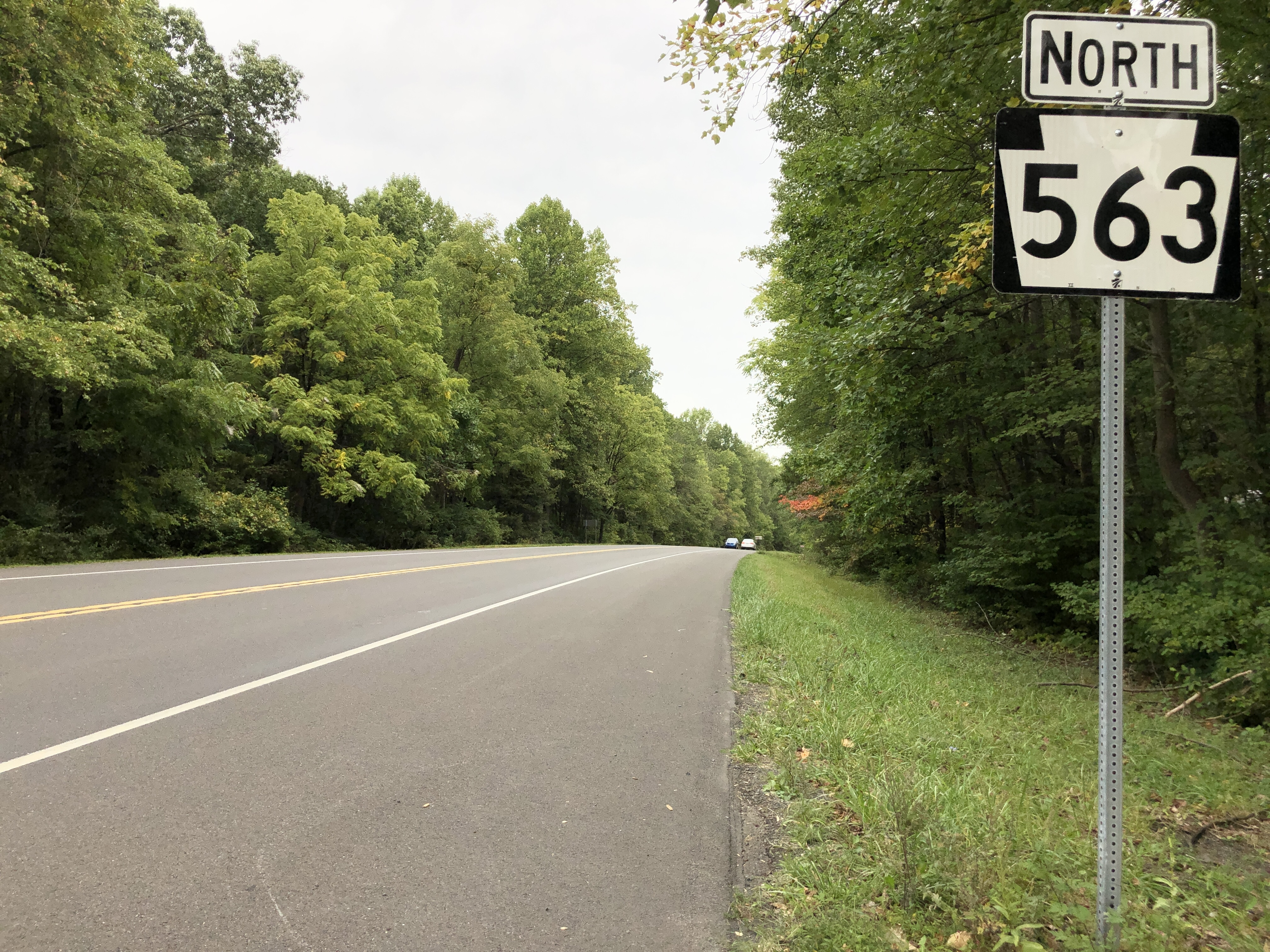
PA 563 northbound in Haycock Township

As of 2018 there were 44.37 miles (71.41 km) of public roads in Haycock Township, of which 23.49 miles (37.80 km) were maintained by the Pennsylvania Department of Transportation (PennDOT) and 20.88 miles (33.60 km) were maintained by the township.

Pennsylvania Route 563 is the only numbered highway directly serving Haycock Township. It follows Mountain View Drive on a southwest-to-northeast alignment through the southeastern section of the township.

== Education ==
Quakertown Community School District serves public school students in Haycock Township. Most township students attend Neidig Elementary School in Quakertown for grades K-5. All attend the Sixth Grade Center for sixth grade, Strayer Middle School for grades 7-8, and Quakertown Community High School for grades 9-12.

== Climate ==
According to the Köppen climate classification system, Haycock Twp has a Hot-summer, Humid continental climate (Dfa). Dfa climates are characterized by at least one month having an average mean temperature ≤ 32.0 °F (0.0 °C), at least four months with an average mean temperature ≥ 50.0 °F (10.0 °C), at least one month with an average mean temperature ≥ 71.6 °F (22.0 °C) and no significant precipitation difference between seasons. Although most summer days are slightly humid in Haycock Twp, episodes of heat and high humidity can occur with heat index values > 104 °F (40 °C). Since 1981, the highest air temperature was 101.4 °F (38.6 °C) on 07/22/2011, and the highest daily average mean dew point was 73.9 °F (23.3 °C) on 08/12/2016. The average wettest month is July which corresponds with the annual peak in thunderstorm activity. Since 1981, the wettest calendar day was 6.64 inches (169 mm) on 08/27/2011. During the winter months, the average annual extreme minimum air temperature is −3.6 °F (−19.8 °C). Since 1981, the coldest air temperature was −13.9 °F (−25.5 °C) on 01/22/1984. Episodes of extreme cold and wind can occur with wind chill values < −15 °F (−26 °C). The average annual snowfall (Nov-Apr) is between 30 inches (76 cm) and 36 inches (91 cm). Ice storms and large snowstorms depositing ≥ 12 inches (30 cm) of snow occur once every few years, particularly during nor’easters from December through February.

Climate data for Haycock Twp, Elevation 574 ft (175 m), 1981-2010 normals, extremes 1981-2018
Month	Jan	Feb	Mar	Apr	May	Jun	Jul	Aug	Sep	Oct	Nov	Dec	Year
Record high °F (°C)	69.9 (21.1)	77.7 (25.4)	86.8 (30.4)	93.0 (33.9)	93.9 (34.4)	94.5 (34.7)	101.4 (38.6)	98.6 (37.0)	96.2 (35.7)	88.9 (31.6)	79.5 (26.4)	73.7 (23.2)	101.4 (38.6)
Mean daily maximum °F (°C)	37.4 (3.0)	40.9 (4.9)	49.3 (9.6)	61.6 (16.4)	71.5 (21.9)	79.8 (26.6)	84.0 (28.9)	82.3 (27.9)	75.6 (24.2)	64.3 (17.9)	53.2 (11.8)	41.7 (5.4)	61.9 (16.6)
Daily mean °F (°C)	28.6 (−1.9)	31.3 (−0.4)	39.0 (3.9)	50.1 (10.1)	59.9 (15.5)	68.8 (20.4)	73.2 (22.9)	71.7 (22.1)	64.3 (17.9)	53.1 (11.7)	43.3 (6.3)	33.2 (0.7)	51.5 (10.8)
Mean daily minimum °F (°C)	19.9 (−6.7)	21.8 (−5.7)	28.7 (−1.8)	38.6 (3.7)	48.3 (9.1)	57.8 (14.3)	62.5 (16.9)	61.0 (16.1)	53.1 (11.7)	42.0 (5.6)	33.5 (0.8)	24.8 (−4.0)	41.1 (5.1)
Record low °F (°C)	−13.9 (−25.5)	−6.5 (−21.4)	0.9 (−17.3)	15.9 (−8.9)	31.5 (−0.3)	39.4 (4.1)	45.4 (7.4)	40.3 (4.6)	33.8 (1.0)	22.7 (−5.2)	9.8 (−12.3)	−3.4 (−19.7)	−13.9 (−25.5)
Average precipitation inches (mm)	3.53 (90)	2.88 (73)	3.74 (95)	4.23 (107)	4.27 (108)	4.35 (110)	5.06 (129)	4.08 (104)	4.49 (114)	4.52 (115)	3.82 (97)	4.17 (106)	49.14 (1,248)
Average relative humidity (%)	68.7	65.3	60.8	59.2	63.5	70.0	69.9	72.3	73.4	71.4	70.4	70.7	68.0
Average dew point °F (°C)	19.6 (−6.9)	21.0 (−6.1)	26.6 (−3.0)	36.4 (2.4)	47.5 (8.6)	58.6 (14.8)	62.8 (17.1)	62.3 (16.8)	55.6 (13.1)	44.1 (6.7)	34.3 (1.3)	24.7 (−4.1)	41.2 (5.1)
Source: PRISM

== Ecology ==
According to the A. W. Kuchler U.S. potential natural vegetation types, Haycock Twp would have a dominant vegetation type of Appalachian Oak (104) with a dominant vegetation form of Eastern Hardwood Forest (25). The plant hardiness zone is 6b with an average annual extreme minimum air temperature of −3.6 °F (−19.8 °C). The spring bloom typically begins by April 15 and fall color usually peaks by October 26.
