= East Rockhill Township, Pennsylvania =

Township in Pennsylvania, US

East Rockhill Township
- Township
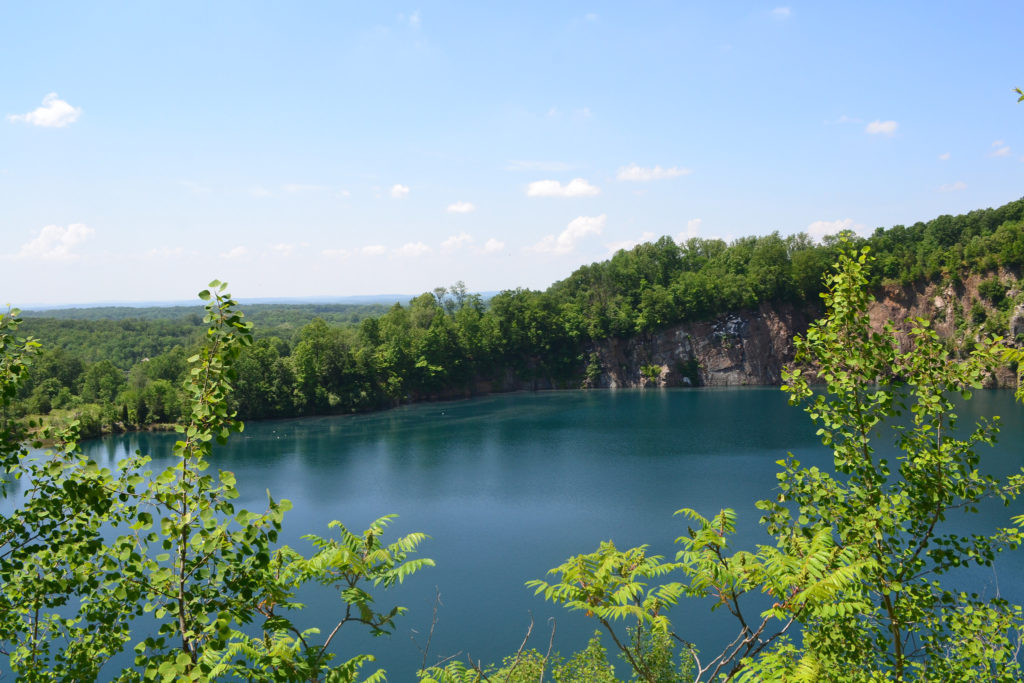
- East Rockhill Quarry

- Seal

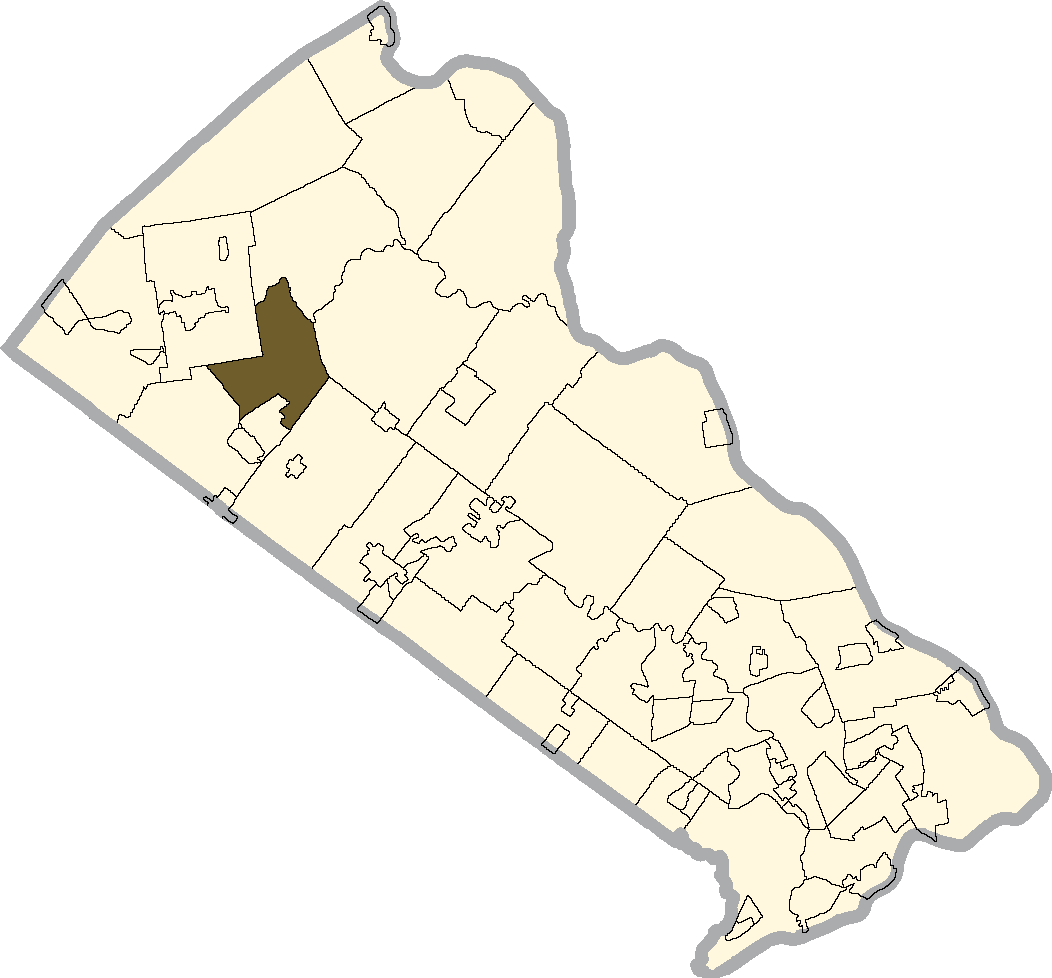
- Location of East Rockhill Township in Bucks County

- Location in Pennsylvania and the United States East Rockhill Township (the United States)
- Coordinates: 40°26′18″N 75°16′16″W
- Country: United States
- State: Pennsylvania
- County: Bucks

Area
  - Total: 13.09 sq mi (33.9 km^{2})
  - Land: 12.91 sq mi (33.4 km^{2})
  - Water: 0.18 sq mi (0.47 km^{2})
- Elevation: 446 ft (136 m)

Population (2010)
  - Total: 5,706
  - Estimate (2016): 5,730
  - Density: 442.0/sq mi (170.7/km^{2})
- Time zone: UTC-5 (EST)
  - Summer (DST): UTC-4 (EDT)
- Area codes: 215, 267 and 445
- FIPS code: 42-017-21760
- Website: eastrockhilltownship.org

East Rockhill Township is a township in Bucks County, Pennsylvania, United States. The population was 5,706 at the 2010 Census. East Rockhill is part of Pennridge School District.

== History ==
The original Rockhill Township was established in 1740 and was divided into East and West Rockhill Townships in 1890. The Levi Sheard Mill and Sheard's Mill Covered Bridge are listed on the National Register of Historic Places. It was also the location of the formerly listed Mood's Covered Bridge.

== Geography ==
According to the United States Census Bureau, the township has a total area of 13.1 square miles (34 km^{2}), of which 12.9 square miles (33 km^{2}) is land and 0.2 square miles (0.52 km^{2}) (1.14%) is water. Tohickon Creek flows along the northern edge of the township into Lake Nockamixon at its northeastern edge and eastward into the Delaware River and drains most of East Rockhill. The southeastern side of the township is drained by the East Branch Perkiomen Creek into the Perkiomen Creek and Schuylkill River.

East Rockhill's villages include Hagersville, Rich Hill, Rockhill, Rockhill Station, Rock Ridge, Smoketown (also in West Rockhill), Sterners Mill, Weisel, and White Horse.

Natural features include the East Branch Perkiomen Creek, Rock Hill, Three Mile Run, and Tohickon Creek.

=== Adjacent municipalities ===
- West Rockhill Township (west)
- Richland Township (northwest)
- Haycock Township (north)
- Bedminster Township (east)
- Hilltown Township (southeast)
- Perkasie (south)

== Demographics ==
Historical population
Census	Pop.	Note	%±
1930	1,520		—
1940	1,350		−11.2%
1950	1,626		20.4%
1960	1,990		22.4%
1970	2,866		44.0%
1980	2,971		3.7%
1990	3,753		26.3%
2000	5,199		38.5%
2010	5,706		9.8%
2020	5,819		2.0%

As of the 2010 census, the township was 95.8% White, 0.7% Black or African American, 0.2% Native American, 0.6% Asian, and 1.2% were two or more races. 1.6% of the population were of Hispanic or Latino ancestry.

As of the census of 2000, there were 5,199 people, 1,828 households, and 1,427 families residing in the township. The population density was 401.5 inhabitants per square mile (155.0/km^{2}). There were 1,883 housing units at an average density of 145.4 per square mile (56.1/km^{2}). The racial makeup of the township was 97.19% White, 0.81% African American, 0.40% Native American, 0.38% Asian, 0.06% Pacific Islander, 0.19% from other races, and 0.96% from two or more races. Hispanic or Latino of any race were 1.25% of the population.

There were 1,828 households, out of which 40.4% had children under the age of 18 living with them, 68.6% were married couples living together, 5.8% had a female householder with no husband present, and 21.9% were non-families. 17.1% of all households were made up of individuals, and 5.4% had someone living alone who was 65 years of age or older. The average household size was 2.82 and the average family size was 3.21.

In the township the population was spread out, with 28.8% under the age of 18, 6.3% from 18 to 24, 32.5% from 25 to 44, 23.6% from 45 to 64, and 8.9% who were 65 years of age or older. The median age was 36 years. For every 100 females there were 102.1 males. For every 100 females age 18 and over, there were 101.0 males.

The median income for a household in the township was $59,663, and the median income for a family was $70,645. Males had a median income of $43,134 versus $30,473 for females. The per capita income for the township was $24,594. About 2.0% of families and 4.9% of the population were below the poverty line, including 3.0% of those under age 18 and 7.6% of those age 65 or over.

== Transportation ==
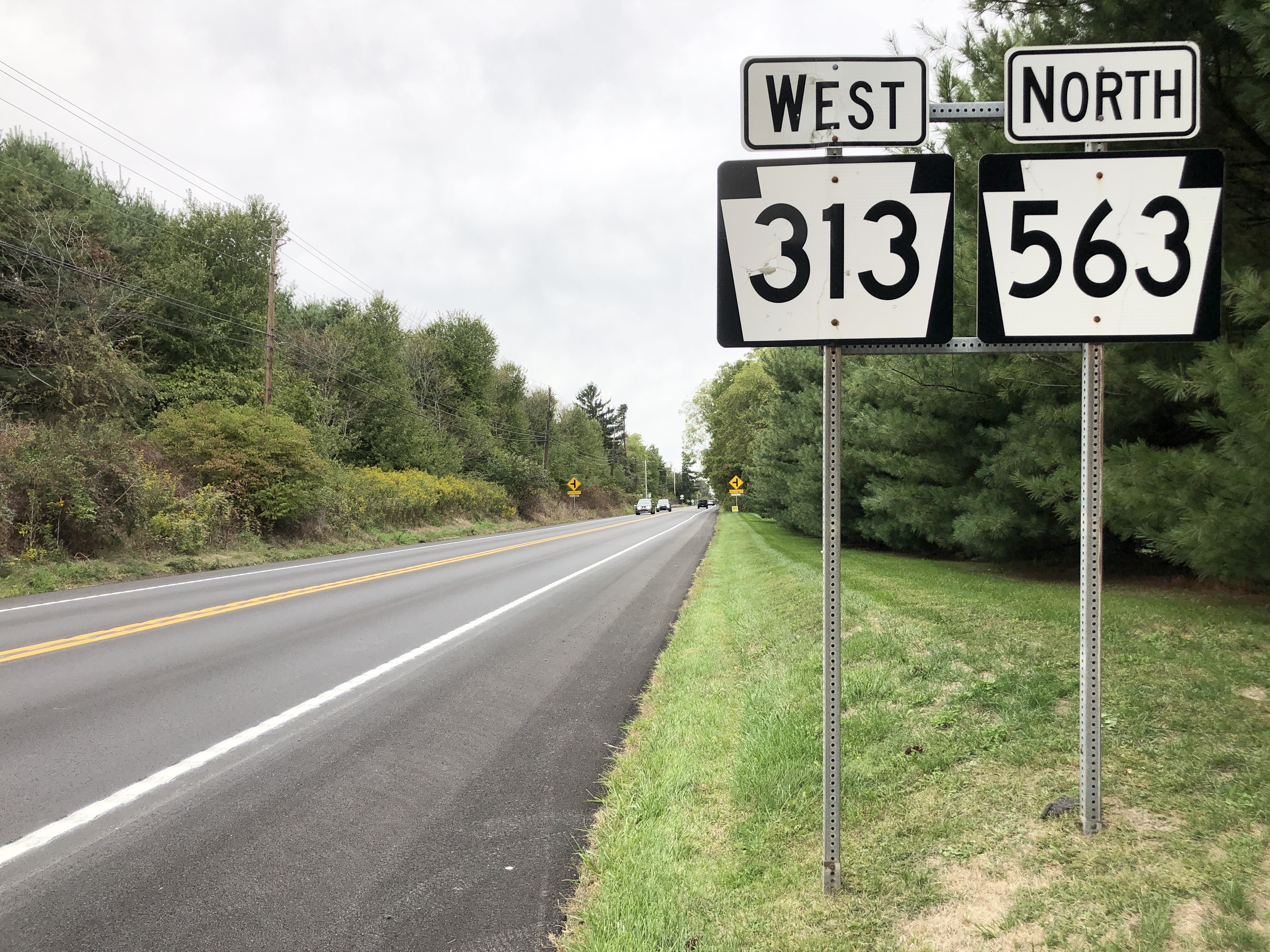
PA 313 westbound and PA 563 northbound in East Rockhill Township

As of 2022 there were 48.33 miles (77.78 km) of public roads in East Rockhill Township, of which 11.19 miles (18.01 km) were maintained by the Pennsylvania Department of Transportation (PennDOT) and 37.14 miles (59.77 km) were maintained by the township.

The main highways serving East Rockhill Township are Pennsylvania Route 313 and Pennsylvania Route 563. PA 313 follows a southeast-northwest alignment following Dublin Pike across northeastern portions of the township. PA 563 follows a north-south alignment utilizing Ridge Road, Dublin Pike and Mountain View Drive across the eastern portion of the township. The two highways have a concurrency along a portion of Dublin Pike.

There is currently no public transportation directly serving East Rockhill Township. However, the northern portal of the Perkasie Tunnel is in the township.

Pennridge Airport is located within the township.

== Climate ==
According to the Köppen climate classification system, East Rockhill Twp has a Hot-summer, Humid continental climate (Dfa). Dfa climates are characterized by at least one month having an average mean temperature ≤ 32.0 °F (0.0 °C), at least four months with an average mean temperature ≥ 50.0 °F (10.0 °C), at least one month with an average mean temperature ≥ 71.6 °F (22.0 °C) and no significant precipitation difference between seasons. Although most summer days are slightly humid in East Rockhill Twp, episodes of heat and high humidity can occur with heat index values > 104 °F (40 °C). Since 1981, the highest air temperature was 101.5 °F (38.6 °C) on July 22, 2011, and the highest daily average mean dew point was 74.3 °F (23.5 °C) on August 12, 2016. The average wettest month is July, which corresponds with the annual peak in thunderstorm activity. Since 1981, the wettest calendar day was 6.73 inches (171 mm) on August 27, 2011. During the winter months, the average annual extreme minimum air temperature is −2.8 °F (−19.3 °C). Since 1981, the coldest air temperature was −13.7 °F (−25.4 °C), on January 22, 1984. Episodes of extreme cold and wind can occur with wind chill values < −14 °F (−26 °C). The average annual snowfall (Nov-Apr) is between 30 inches (76 cm) and 36 inches (91 cm). Ice storms and large snowstorms depositing ≥ 12 inches (30 cm) of snow occur once every few years, particularly during nor’easters from December through February.

Climate data for East Rockhill Twp, Elevation 469 ft (143 m), 1981-2010 normals, extremes 1981-2018
Month	Jan	Feb	Mar	Apr	May	Jun	Jul	Aug	Sep	Oct	Nov	Dec	Year
Record high °F (°C)	69.9 (21.1)	77.5 (25.3)	86.1 (30.1)	92.6 (33.7)	93.9 (34.4)	94.6 (34.8)	101.5 (38.6)	98.6 (37.0)	96.4 (35.8)	88.4 (31.3)	79.6 (26.4)	74.1 (23.4)	101.5 (38.6)
Mean daily maximum °F (°C)	37.8 (3.2)	41.2 (5.1)	49.7 (9.8)	61.9 (16.6)	71.9 (22.2)	80.4 (26.9)	84.4 (29.1)	82.8 (28.2)	76.0 (24.4)	64.5 (18.1)	53.4 (11.9)	41.9 (5.5)	62.3 (16.8)
Daily mean °F (°C)	29.2 (−1.6)	31.9 (−0.1)	39.6 (4.2)	50.5 (10.3)	60.3 (15.7)	69.3 (20.7)	73.7 (23.2)	72.1 (22.3)	64.8 (18.2)	53.2 (11.8)	43.5 (6.4)	33.6 (0.9)	51.9 (11.1)
Mean daily minimum °F (°C)	20.5 (−6.4)	22.6 (−5.2)	29.5 (−1.4)	39.1 (3.9)	48.7 (9.3)	58.2 (14.6)	63.1 (17.3)	61.5 (16.4)	53.5 (11.9)	41.9 (5.5)	33.5 (0.8)	25.2 (−3.8)	41.5 (5.3)
Record low °F (°C)	−13.7 (−25.4)	−6.1 (−21.2)	1.7 (−16.8)	15.9 (−8.9)	30.9 (−0.6)	39.7 (4.3)	46.0 (7.8)	40.8 (4.9)	33.7 (0.9)	22.7 (−5.2)	10.2 (−12.1)	−3.2 (−19.6)	−13.7 (−25.4)
Average precipitation inches (mm)	3.50 (89)	2.85 (72)	3.81 (97)	4.12 (105)	4.33 (110)	4.38 (111)	4.80 (122)	3.90 (99)	4.54 (115)	4.34 (110)	3.76 (96)	4.05 (103)	48.38 (1,229)
Average relative humidity (%)	68.4	65.4	60.9	59.5	63.6	69.5	69.7	72.3	72.9	71.7	70.4	70.7	67.9
Average dew point °F (°C)	20.1 (−6.6)	21.6 (−5.8)	27.2 (−2.7)	36.9 (2.7)	47.9 (8.8)	58.9 (14.9)	63.2 (17.3)	62.7 (17.1)	55.9 (13.3)	44.3 (6.8)	34.5 (1.4)	25.1 (−3.8)	41.6 (5.3)
Source: PRISM

== Ecology ==
According to the A. W. Kuchler U.S. potential natural vegetation types, East Rockhill Twp would have a dominant vegetation type of Appalachian Oak (104) with a dominant vegetation form of Eastern Hardwood Forest (25). The plant hardiness zone is 6b with an average annual extreme minimum air temperature of −2.8 °F (−19.3 °C). The spring bloom typically begins by April 14 and fall color usually peaks by October 26.

== See also ==
- Pennridge Regional Police
