= Sheard's Mill Covered Bridge =

- U.S. National Register of Historic Places
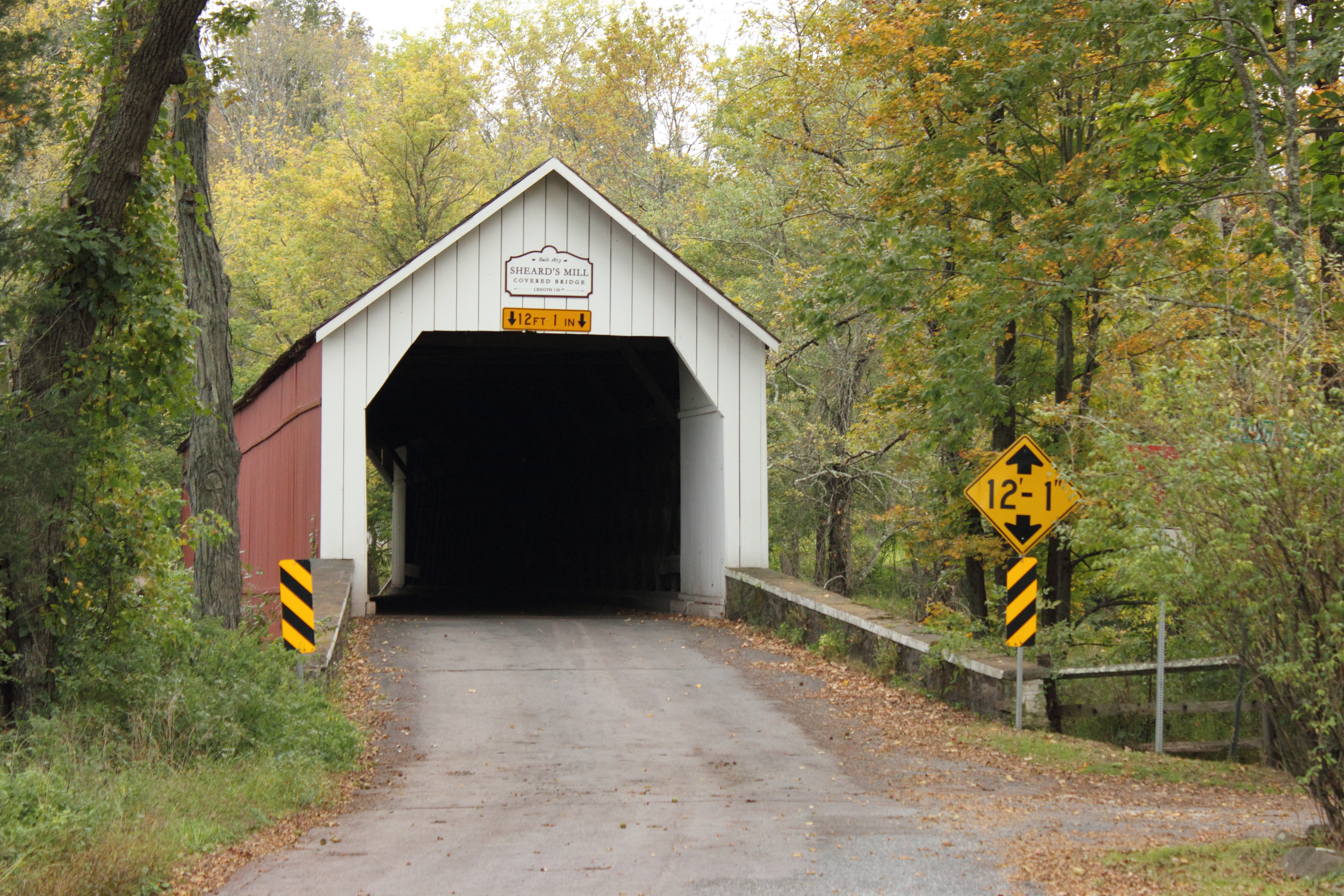
- Sheard's Mill Covered Bridge, September 2012

- Location within Pennsylvania Location within the United States
- Location: East of Quakertown on Legislative Route 09129, East Rockhill Township and Haycock Township, Pennsylvania
- Coordinates: 40.4548°N 75.27815°W
- Area: 0.1 acres (0.040 ha)
- Built: 1873
- Architectural style: Town truss
- MPS: Covered Bridges of the Delaware River Watershed TR
- NRHP reference No.: 80003445
- Added to NRHP: December 1, 1980

The Sheard's Mill Covered Bridge is located in East Rockhill Township and Haycock Township, Bucks County, Pennsylvania next to the Levi Sheard Mill. The bridge was built in 1873, and is 15-foot-wide (4.6 m) and 130-foot-long (40 m), making it one of Bucks County's longest bridges. The bridge crosses the Tohickon Creek on Covered Bridge Road.

The bridge was added to the National Register of Historic Places on December 1, 1980.

== See also ==
- National Register of Historic Places listings in Bucks County, Pennsylvania
- List of bridges on the National Register of Historic Places in Pennsylvania
