= Nockamixon State Park =

State park in Pennsylvania, United States

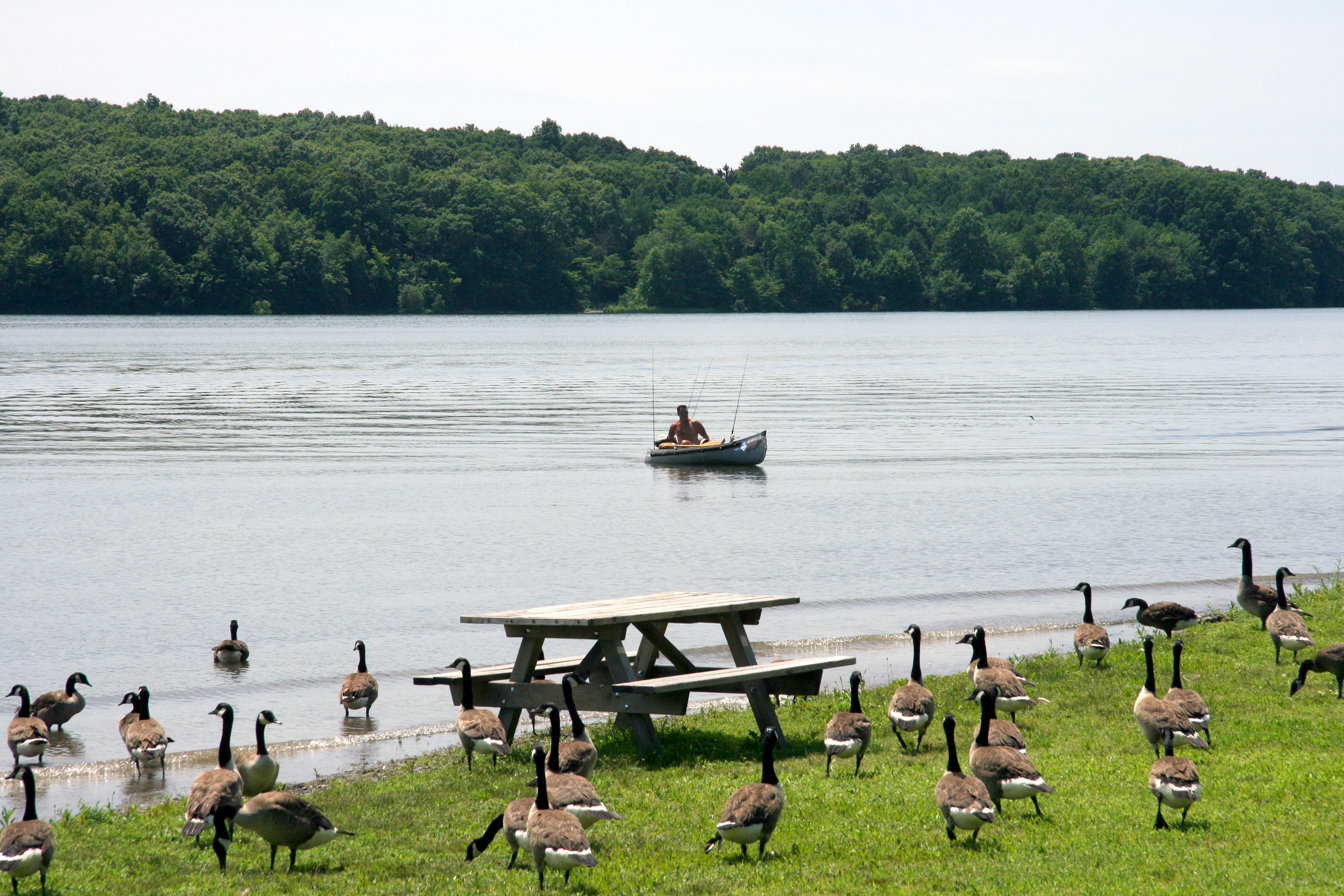

- Location within Pennsylvania Location within the United States
- Interactive map of Nockamixon State Park
- Location: Bucks County, Pennsylvania, United States
- Coordinates: 40°27′48″N 75°14′30″W
- Area: 5,286 acres (2,139 ha)
- Elevation: 440 feet (130 m)
- Established: 1973
- Administrator: Pennsylvania Department of Conservation and Natural Resources
- Website: Official website
- Pennsylvania State Parks

Nockamixon State Park is a Pennsylvania state park on 5,286 acres (2,139 ha) in Bedminster and Haycock Townships in northern Bucks County, Pennsylvania, in the United States. The park is one of the most popular in southeastern Pennsylvania, with most tourists visiting in the summer months.

== Recreation ==
=== Lake Nockamixon ===
Lake Nockamixon is an artificial reservoir formed by a dam on Tohickon Creek and serves as the centerpiece of Nockamixon State Park. Swimming is not allowed in the lake, but boating is popular, and the park maintains several marinas and boat rentals. Fishing is also popular, and common species include walleye, pickerel, carp, and various kinds of bass and catfish. The water is clean and blue and has a very faint current, since the lake is part of the course of Tohickon Creek, which feeds in midway along the northwestern edge of the lake and discharges at the dam at the southeast corner. Lake Nockamixon is also fed by two other creeks known as Haycock Run, which feeds in at the northernmost point, and Three Mile Run, which feeds in at the southernmost point.

In the winter, the water generally freezes over, allowing for ice skating and ice fishing.

Another recreational activity at the park is whitewater kayaking. Every March and November, if high water conditions exist, there are timed water releases from the dam for one day. This turns all of Tohickon Creek south of the lake into a whitewater course, and kayakers can go all the way from the lake to where the creek meets the Delaware River.

=== Horseback riding ===
While the northern side of the lake is very friendly to bike riders and walkers, the southern side of the lake is bike free, and therefore very friendly to horseback riding. Horse rentals are available in the Haycock area and riders can park trailers and/or ride to the park from various locations. There are 20+ miles of trails that are horse friendly and well maintained.

=== Hunting ===
Hunting is permitted at Nockamixon State Park on about 3,000 acres (1,200 ha). Hunters are expected to follow the rules and regulations of the Pennsylvania Game Commission. The common game species are squirrels, turkey, pheasant, and white-tailed deer. The hunting of groundhogs is prohibited. Hunters are limited to using shotguns at the park as per the regulations established by the Game Commission for southeastern Pennsylvania.

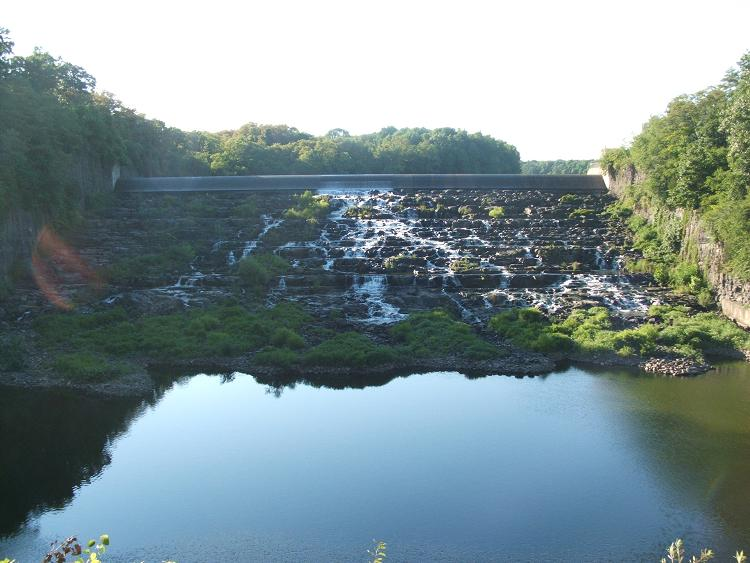
Tohickon Creek flowing out the dam forming Lake Nockamixon

=== Swimming ===
Swimming is prohibited in Lake Nockamixon. The swimming pool is open daily from 11:00 am until 7:00 pm beginning Memorial Day weekend and ending Labor Day weekend. The pool is closed on weekdays the first 2 full weeks of June and the last 2 full weeks of August and is open weekends only during those time periods. The pool is operated by the state and there is an admission fee. The pool is 0.5 acres (0.20 ha) in size and features slides, fountains, and a children's splash area.

== History ==
Creation of the lake was first proposed by the Secretary of the Department of Forests and Water, Dr. Maurice K. Goddard, for recreational uses. It was originally to be called Tohickon Lake, after the creek, but its name was later changed to Nockamixon, meaning "place of soft soil" in the Lenape language. The park today contains several historic Native American sites.

Following its proposal in 1958, the dam was built by the Pennsylvania Department of Forests and Waters. The state park was opened to the public in December 1973.

In order to create the lake, the state bought 5,286 acres of what was known as the Tohickon Valley, including the community of Tohickon, and surrounding Bucks County areas.

== Climate ==
According to the Trewartha climate classification system, Nockamixon State Park has a Temperate Continental (Dc) Climate with hot summers (a), cold winters (o) and year-around precipitation. Dcao climates are characterized by at least one month having an average mean temperature ≤ 32.0 °F (0 °C), four to seven months with an average mean temperature ≥ 50.0 °F (10 °C), at least one month with an average mean temperature ≥ 72.0 °F (22 °C) and no significant precipitation difference between seasons. According to the Köppen climate classification, this climate is Dfa (hot-summer humid continental). Although summers are typically slightly humid at Nockamixon State Park, episodes of heat and high humidity can occur with heat index values > 104 °F (40 °C). Since 1981, the highest air temperature was 101.7 °F (39 °C) on 07/22/2011, and the highest average mean dew point was 74.1 °F (23 °C) on 08/12/2016. The average wettest month is July which corresponds with the annual peak in thunderstorm activity. Since 1981, the wettest calendar day was 6.62 inches (168 mm) on 08/27/2011. During the winter months, the plant hardiness zone is 6b with an average annual extreme minimum air temperature of −2.7 °F (−19 °C). Since 1981, the coldest air temperature was −13.7 °F (−25 °C) on 01/22/1984. Episodes of extreme cold and wind can occur with wind chill values < −14 °F (−26 °C). The average annual snowfall is between 30 and 36 inches (76 and 91 cm). Ice storms and large snowstorms depositing ≥ 12 inches (30 cm) occur once every few years, particularly during nor’easters from December through February.

Climate data for Lake Nockamixon. Elevation: 400 ft (122 m). 1981-2010 Averages (1981-2018 Records)
Month	Jan	Feb	Mar	Apr	May	Jun	Jul	Aug	Sep	Oct	Nov	Dec	Year
Record high °F (°C)	69.9 (21.1)	77.7 (25.4)	86.6 (30.3)	93.0 (33.9)	94.2 (34.6)	94.7 (34.8)	101.7 (38.7)	98.6 (37.0)	96.4 (35.8)	88.8 (31.6)	79.5 (26.4)	74.0 (23.3)	101.7 (38.7)
Mean daily maximum °F (°C)	37.9 (3.3)	41.3 (5.2)	49.9 (9.9)	62.2 (16.8)	72.2 (22.3)	80.7 (27.1)	84.6 (29.2)	82.9 (28.3)	76.1 (24.5)	64.6 (18.1)	53.5 (11.9)	42.1 (5.6)	62.4 (16.9)
Daily mean °F (°C)	29.2 (−1.6)	31.9 (−0.1)	39.6 (4.2)	50.6 (10.3)	60.4 (15.8)	69.4 (20.8)	73.8 (23.2)	72.2 (22.3)	64.8 (18.2)	53.3 (11.8)	43.5 (6.4)	33.6 (0.9)	52.0 (11.1)
Mean daily minimum °F (°C)	20.4 (−6.4)	22.4 (−5.3)	29.3 (−1.5)	39.1 (3.9)	48.6 (9.2)	58.1 (14.5)	63.0 (17.2)	61.4 (16.3)	53.4 (11.9)	42.0 (5.6)	33.5 (0.8)	25.2 (−3.8)	41.5 (5.3)
Record low °F (°C)	−13.7 (−25.4)	−6.4 (−21.3)	1.3 (−17.1)	15.9 (−8.9)	31.3 (−0.4)	39.4 (4.1)	45.6 (7.6)	40.3 (4.6)	33.5 (0.8)	22.5 (−5.3)	9.9 (−12.3)	−0.3 (−17.9)	−13.7 (−25.4)
Average precipitation inches (mm)	3.52 (89)	2.86 (73)	3.75 (95)	4.19 (106)	4.25 (108)	4.33 (110)	5.00 (127)	4.05 (103)	4.46 (113)	4.49 (114)	3.80 (97)	4.15 (105)	48.85 (1,241)
Average relative humidity (%)	68.1	64.8	60.1	58.8	63.4	69.3	69.3	72.1	73.2	71.4	70.4	70.4	67.6
Average dew point °F (°C)	20.0 (−6.7)	21.4 (−5.9)	26.9 (−2.8)	36.7 (2.6)	47.9 (8.8)	58.9 (14.9)	63.1 (17.3)	62.7 (17.1)	56.0 (13.3)	44.3 (6.8)	34.5 (1.4)	25.0 (−3.9)	41.5 (5.3)
Source: PRISM

== Ecology ==
According to the A. W. Kuchler U.S. potential natural vegetation types, Nockamixon State Park would have dominant vegetation type of Appalachian Oak (104) with a dominant vegetation form of Eastern Hardwood Forest (25).
