= East Branch Perkiomen Creek =

Coordinates: 40.42593°N 75.21836°W

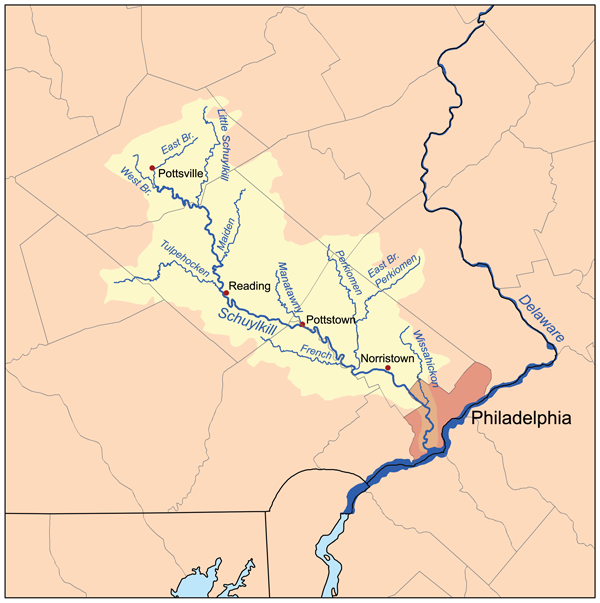
Schuylkill River watershed. East Branch Perkiomen Creek joins Perkiomen Creek east of Pottstown and northwest of Norristown in the map.

East Branch Perkiomen Creek is a 24.5-mile-long (39.4 km) tributary of Perkiomen Creek in southeast Pennsylvania in the United States.

The East Branch Perkiomen Creek is born in Bucks County and joins Perkiomen Creek at Schwenksville in Montgomery County.

Local road signs label the creek as Branch Creek. The creek passes under the Mood's Covered Bridge in East Rockhill Township.

== See also ==
- List of rivers of Pennsylvania
