= Tohickon Creek =

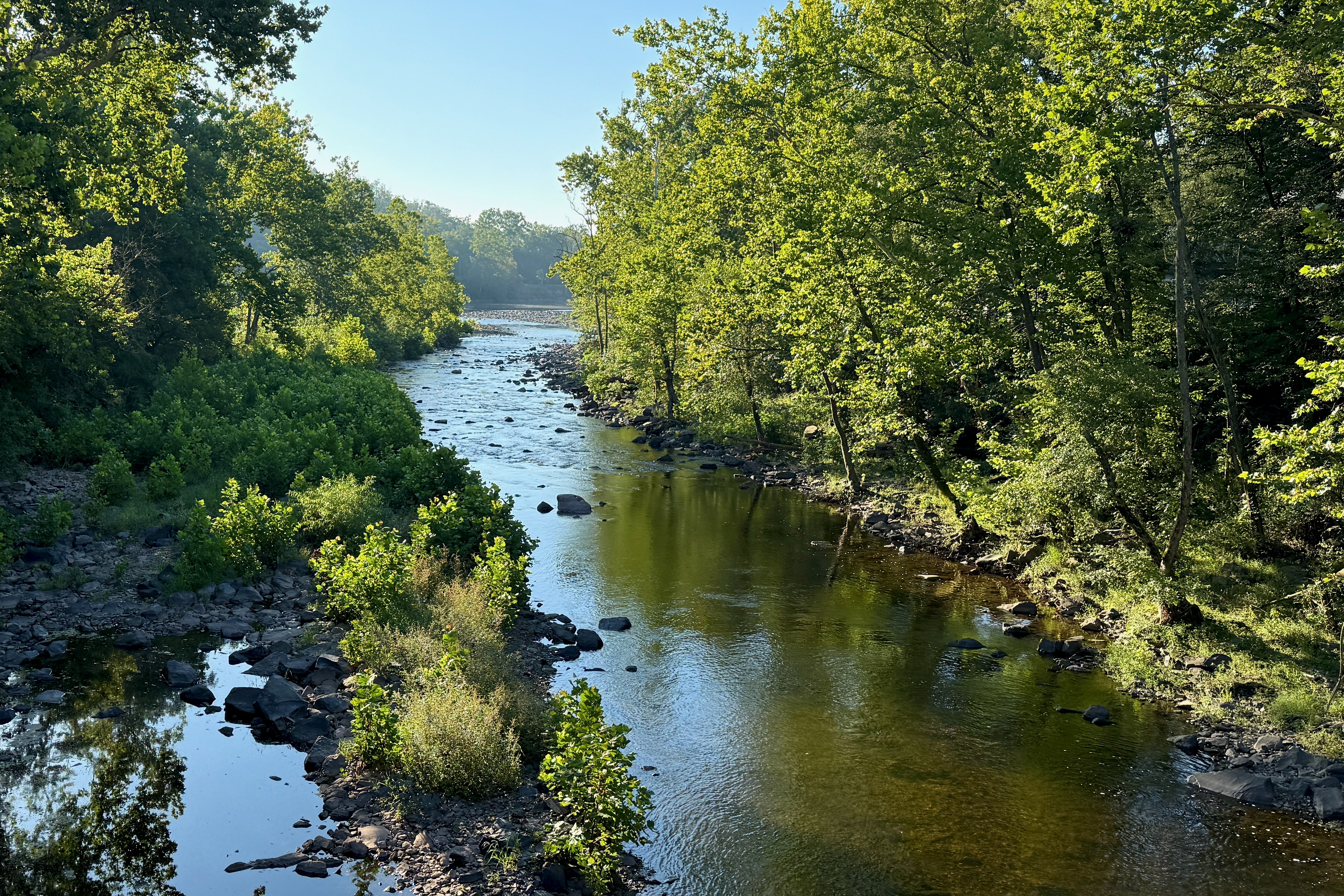
- View of the confluence of the Tohickon Creek with the Delaware River in Point Pleasant

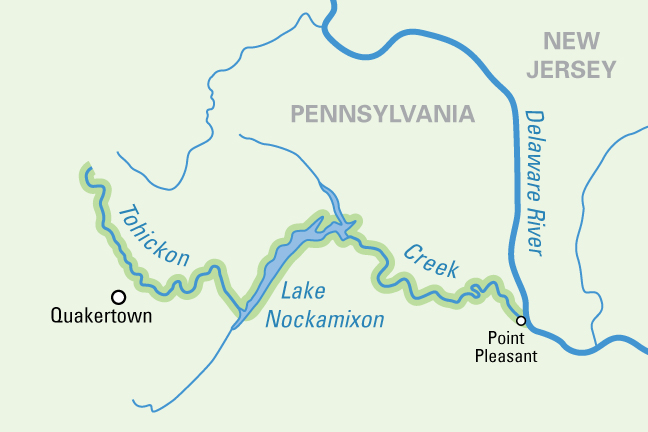
- Tohickon Creek

- Tohickon Creek
- Native name: Tachan Hoking (Unami); Achtuhhu Ing (Unami); Toh-hick-han; Toh-hick-hanne

Location
- Country: United States
- State: Pennsylvania
- County: Bucks
- Township: Springfield; Richland; Haycock; East Rockhill; Nockamixon; Tinicum; Bedminster; Plumstead
- Borough: Quakertown

Physical characteristics
- Source: The Lookout (Springfield Township)
  - coordinates: 40°30′35″N 75°21′37″W
  - elevation: 640 feet (200 m)
- Mouth
  - coordinates: 40°25′16″N 75°3′41″W
  - elevation: 72 feet (22 m)
- Length: 29.5 miles (47.5 km)
- Basin size: 112 square miles (290 km^{2})

Basin features
- Progression: Tohickon Creek → Delaware River → Delaware Bay
- River system: Delaware River
- Landmarks: Haycock Mountain
- Tributaries
  - left: Dimple Creek; Haycock Creek
  - right: Morgan Creek; Threemile Run; Mink Run; Deer Run; Wolf Run; Deep Run; Cabin Run; Geddes Run
- Waterbodies: Lake Nockamixon
- Bridges: Rocky Valley Road; Povenski Road; Hickon Road; East Cherry Road; California Road; East Pumping Station Road; Pennsylvania Route 212 (Richlandtown Pike); Erie Road; West Thatcher Road; Richlandtown Road; Covered Bridge Road (Sheard's Mill Covered Bridge); Pennsylvania Route 563 (Mountain View Drive); South Park Road; Creamery Road; Farm School Road; Pennsylvania Route 113 (Bedminster Road); Pennsylvania Route 611 (Easton Road); Randts Mill Road; Dark Hollow Road; Stover Park Road; Pennsylvania Route 32 (River Road); Delaware Canal aqueduct and towpath
- Slope: 19.25 feet per mile (3.646 m/km)

National Wild and Scenic Rivers System

Tohickon Creek is a 29.5-mile-long (47.5 km) tributary of the Delaware River. Located entirely in Bucks County, in southeastern Pennsylvania, it rises in Springfield Township and has its confluence with the Delaware at Point Pleasant. It is dammed to form Lake Nockamixon.

== History ==
Prior to European settlement, the area through which the creek runs was inhabited by the Lenape tribe. The area was called Tachan Hoking (pronounced Toc-ahn Hok Ing) or "Piece of Wood Area Place." It could also mean Achtuhhu Ing (pronounced "Awk-too-who Ing") or "Deers Place." Early white settlers in the area noted the fast, constant current of the creek, and by the late eighteenth century a number of water-powered mills had sprung up along the lower portion of the Tohickon valley. Notable among these was the grist mill of Ralph Stover, in Plumstead Township. During the Great Depression of the 1930s, long after the mill had been shut down, the Stover heirs gave the area around the mill to the Commonwealth of Pennsylvania. After the Federal Works Progress Administration converted the area for recreational use, a Ralph Stover State Park was opened to the public in 1935.

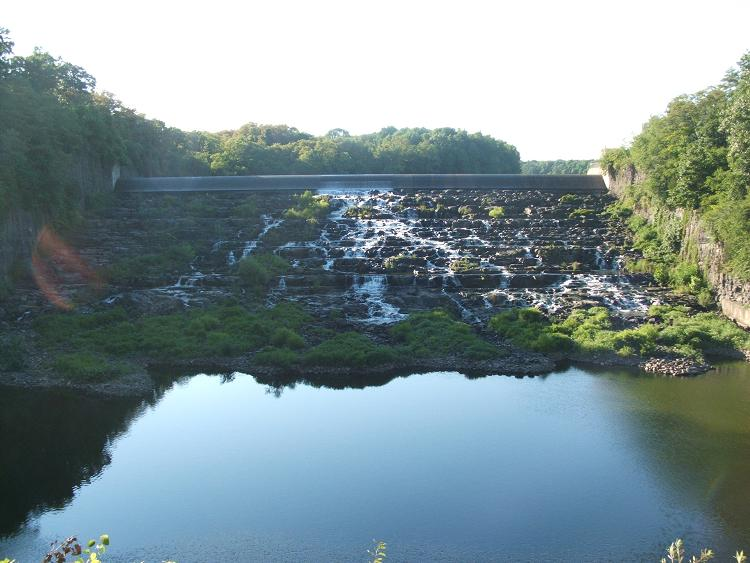
Tohickon Creek flowing out of the dam forming Lake Nockamixon.

The creation of Ralph Stover State Park was the beginning of the Tohickon Creek's shift from an industrial area to a recreational area. The next move in this direction came in 1958, when the United States Army Corps of Engineers dammed the creek just south of Quakertown, forming Tohickon Lake, another state park. It was later renamed Lake Nockamixon, another Lenape name meaning "place of soft soil."

More and more land along the creek was eventually turned into parkland. The next addition to the park was the High Rocks unit of Ralph Stover State Park, donated to the Commonwealth by the noted author James A. Michener, a local resident. It features vertical rock cliffs above the creek. Today another park, Tohickon Valley County Park, borders High Rocks on three sides and their trail systems interlace. Together they protect the steep valley that Tohickon Creek cuts through the hills south of the old grist mill.

The Boy Scouts of America also have a camp located along the creek, Camp Ockanickon, and a few private campgrounds are located along its course.

== Statistics ==
The Tohickon Creek is 29.5 miles (47.5 km) long, located entirely within Bucks County, is part of the Delaware River watershed, and drains of 112 square miles (290 km^{2}). The GNIS I.D. Number is 1189623, the U.S. Department of the Interior stream code is 03110. It meets its confluence at the Delaware's 157.0 river mile.

== Course ==
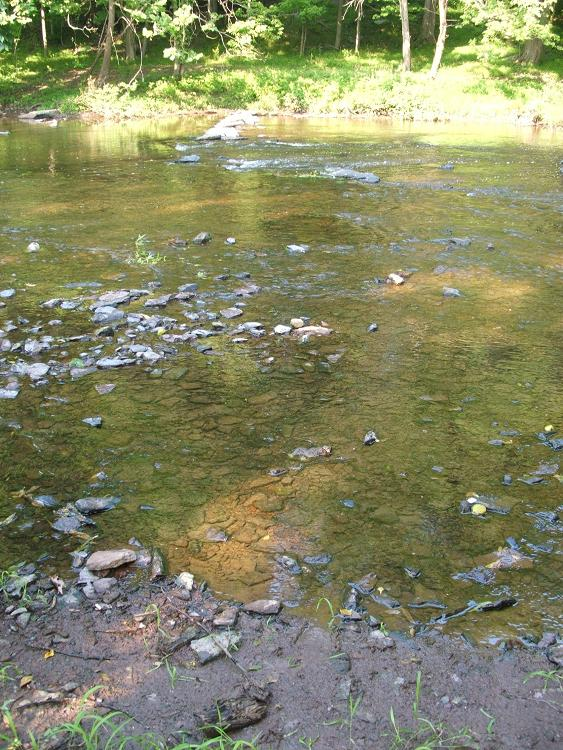
One of the calmer spots along the creek north of the lower valley.

Tohickon Creek is the longest waterway located entirely in Bucks County. Its tortuous course begins in the far north of the county, then generally winds east to the Delaware River. For the purpose of this article, its course can be divided into three main segments: the western half, Lake Nockamixon, and the eastern half.

Western course

Tohickon Creek begins its journey to the Delaware as a small, nondescript stream in Springfield Township on the slopes of The Lookout. From its source, it heads generally south, straight into Richland Township then Quakertown, the largest settlement along its entire course. It then takes a sharp turn east and for a while forms the boundary between Haycock and East Rockhill Townships. It takes one more turn south before heading into Lake Nockamixon.

Along this part of its route, the creek starts off small. Unlike the rest of its course, the ground is relatively flat and rock-free, giving it a slow current and somewhat muddy appearance. Because of the flatness of the area, Tohickon Creek's watershed along its western section is significantly larger than downstream. By the time the creek flows into Lake Nockamixon, it has already met about half of its tributaries.

As far as recreation goes, Camp Tohikanee and scenic Sheards Mill and Sheard's Mill Covered Bridge are located along this first part of the creek's route.

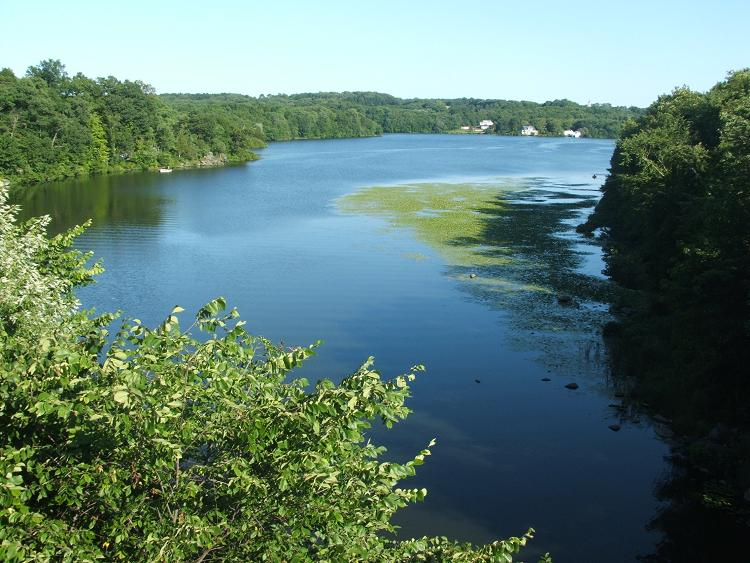
Tohickon Creek widens as it flows into Lake Nockamixon.

Lake Nockamixon

Almost exactly halfway through its route, the creek forms and runs through Lake Nockamixon. This is the only section of the course of significant distance where it flows northeast. It is about 5 miles (8 km) from where the stream becomes the lake and the dam where it becomes Tohickon Creek again. Along this distance it forms the boundary between Haycock and Bedminster Townships.

As the stream widens into the vast Lake Nockamixon, the current becomes almost undetectable. However, the deep water is by no means stagnant, and tends to stay clean and blue. For the first time along its course, the creek also supports a wide variety of fish, including walleye, pickerel, carp, and various kinds of bass and catfish.

This entire part of the route is contained in Nockamixon State Park. As far as recreation goes, boating and fishing are allowed in the lake water, and visitors may stay at park managed campgrounds along the southern shore of the lake or a nearby youth hostel.

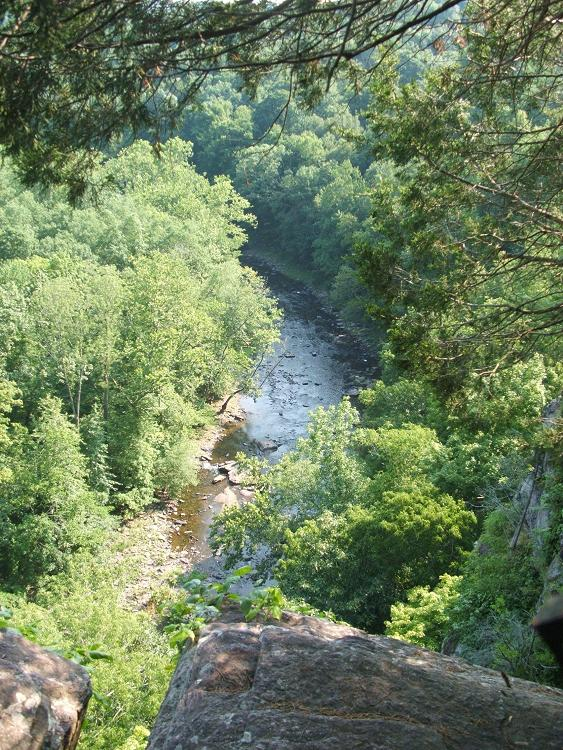
A view of the lower Tohickon Valley from atop High Rocks.

Eastern course

Upon leaving Lake Nockamixon, Tohickon Creek becomes very different from the slow, tiny creek farther west. After leaving the lake it heads southeast, forming the boundary between Bedminster and Tinicum townships. It then begins heading in a generally eastern direction, though it constantly twists and curves for the rest of its route. Here it becomes the boundary between Tinicum and Plumstead townships, and flows through Ralph Stover State Park. At its very end it flows straight through the middle of the village of Point Pleasant and under the Delaware Canal, then finally joins the Delaware River to be carried the rest of the way to the sea.

The ground along this part is very rocky and the creek quickly loses elevation, creating a clear, fast current. It is also along this part of its course that the creek dramatically cuts a valley into the steep hills along its sides. At the area popularly known as High Rocks, vertical walls of stone up to 200 ft (61 m) high rise above the northern edge of the creek. However, as the creek enters Point Pleasant, the ground evens out a bit and the creek becomes relatively more tranquil before entering the river.

Along this lower route of the creek, the rapids of the creek often produce whitewater when high-water conditions exist. At the very end of the creek, the village of Point Pleasant has developed into somewhat of a tourist destination, and visitors can see a number of scenic old bridges that cross the creek before it runs into the Delaware.

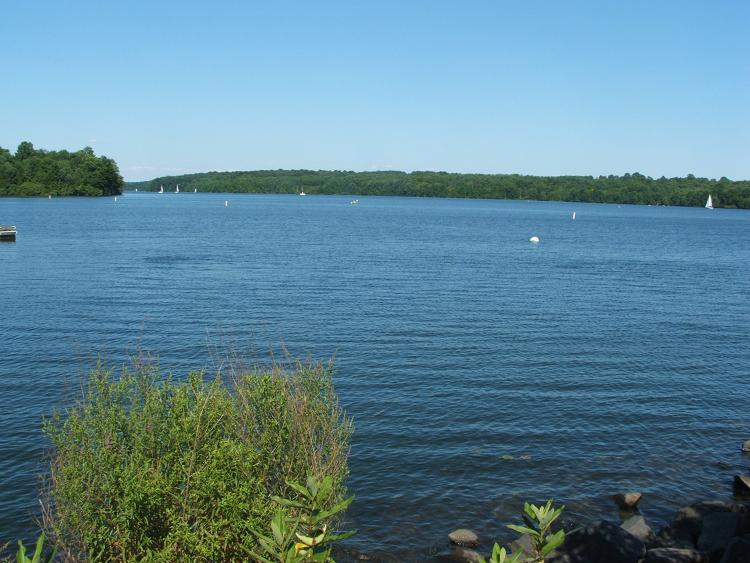
Lake Nockamixon, a popular recreational area.

== Geology ==
- Atlantic Plain
  - Piedmont Province
    - Gettysburg-Newark Lowland Section

The Tohickon risees in Springfield Township on a layer of diabase which intruded into the Gettysburg and Newark basin during the Jurassic and Triassic. The diabase is typically dark gray to black, dense, and fine grained, consisting of predominately labradorite and augite.

It then flows through the Brunswick Formation laid down earlier, consisting of shale, mudstone, and siltstone. Mineralogy includes argillite and hornfels.

After passing through another extension of diabase, it continues its journey through alternating bands of the Brunswick Formation and the Lockatong Formation until it reaches the Delaware. The Lockatong was laid down during the Triassic, consisting of dark argillite, shale, and some impure limestone and calcareous shale.

== Recreational opportunities ==
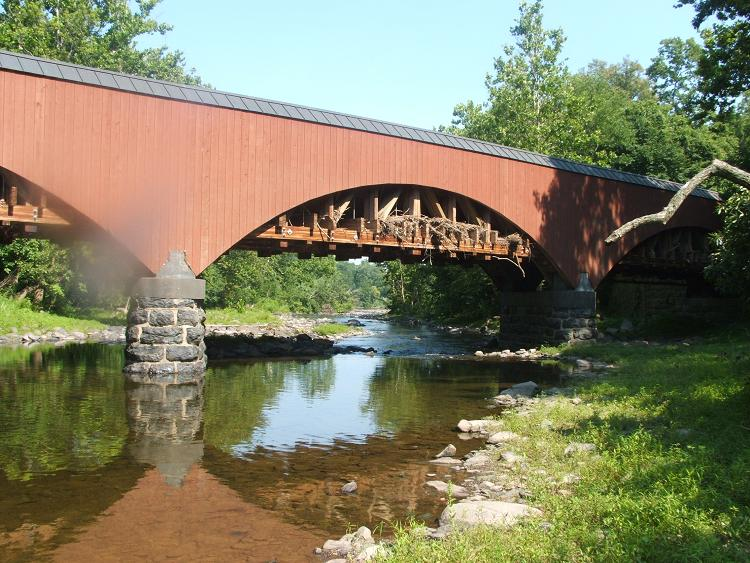
Tohickon Creek flowing under the Delaware Canal just before meeting the Delaware.

Since the 1930s, Tohickon Creek has established itself as one of the best recreational waterways in southeastern Pennsylvania. Along its course, it flows through three state parks: Nockamixon, Ralph Stover, and Delaware Canal. The eastern two thirds of its course are the most heavily used, and it presents many varied opportunities for any visitor.

Lake Nockamixon is the most visited spot along the creek's course. Boating is the most popular activity, and its main marina holds dozens of sail boats, and rents out smaller boats to visitors, too. Fishing is also a popular activity, and a fishing pier has been set up of the shore of the lake. Visitors can also hike or bike ride around the area, hunt in certain areas, and even camp if planning to stay for more than one day. On the third weekend in March and the first weekend in November, when water levels are sufficient, the Pennsylvania Department of Conservation and Natural Resources schedules water releases from the dam at Lake Nockamixon. This turns Tohickon Creek into a whitewater course, and boaters can manage their ways the entire route from the lake to the Delaware River.

At the High Rocks unit of Ralph Stover State Park, visitors can rock climb up 200-foot (60 m) cliffs or look at the view from atop. A pathway, Ridge Trail, travels along the top of the wide valley from High Rocks and goes south into Tohickon Valley County Park towards Point Pleasant. At its very end, the creek passes beneath Delaware Canal State Park, where prior to the floods of 2004–2005 visitors could walk north all the way to Easton or south all the way to Bristol. The debris caught in the bridge in the adjacent picture is from this same flood that destroyed entire parts of the canal. Reconstruction of the park is currently underway.

== Crossings and Bridges ==
Crossing	NBI Number	Length	Lanes	Spans	Material/Design	Built	Reconstructed	Latitude	Longitude
Rocky Valley Road	-	-	-	-	-	-	-	-	
Povenski Road	-	-	-	-	-	-	-	-	
Hickon Road	-	-	-	-	-	-	-	-	
East Cherry Road	7437	8 metres (26 ft)	2	1	Concrete slab	1966	-	40°28'44.2"N	75°21'13.18"W
California Road	7425	14 metres (46 ft)	2	1	Prestressed concrete box beam or girders - Multiple	1970	-	40°28'30"N	75°20'54"W
East Pumping Station Road	7578	41 metres (135 ft)	2	2	Prestressed concrete box beam or girders - Multiple	1982	-	40°27'49"N	75°20'26.8"W
Pennsylvania Route 212 (Richlandtown Pike)	6937	66 metres (217 ft)	2	2	Steel Stringer/multi-beam or girder	1964	-	40°26'53.5"N	75°19'45.95"W
Erie Road	7576	18 metres (59 ft)	2	2	Steel stringer/multi-beam or girder	1932	-	40°26'40.5"N	75°19'11.2"W
West Thatcher Road	7413	61 metres (200 ft)	2	2	Steel stringer/multi-beam or girder	1973	-	40°26'25.7"N	75°18'40.4"W
Richlandtown Road	7416	28 metres (92 ft)	2	1	Steel stringer/multi-beam or girder	1974	2004	40°26'56"N	75°17'20.16"W
Covered Bridge Road (Sheard's Mill Covered Bridge)	7470	38 metres (125 ft)	1	1	Covered bridge	1873	1971	40°27'17.5"N	75°16'44.06"W
Pennsylvania Route 563 (Mountain View Drive)	7054	86 metres (282 ft)	2	3	Prestressed concrete stringer/multi-beam or girder	1972	-	40°26'8.2"N	75°15'54.13"W
South Park Road	7469	92 metres (302 ft)	2	3	Prestressed concrete stringer/nulti-beam or girder	1976	-	40°28'3.5"N	75°10'47.93"W
Creamery Road	-	-	-	-	-	-	-	-	
Farm School Road	-	-	-	-	-	-	-	-	
Pennsylvania Route 113 (Bedminster Road)	-	-	-	-	-	-	-	-	
Pennsylvania Route 611 (Easton Road)	-	-	-	-	-	-	-	-	
Randts Mill Road	-	-	-	-	-	-	-	-	
Dark Hollow Road	42700	52 metres (171 ft)	2	2	Prestressed concrete continuous box beam or girders - single or spread	2004	-	40°26'18"N	75°7'30"W
Stover Park Road	-	-	-	-	-	-	-	-	
Pennsylvania Route 32 (River Road)	6807	48 metres (157 ft)	2	2	Concrete Arch-deck	1922	-	40°25'22.2"N	75°3'59"W
Delaware Canal Tohickon Creek Aqueduct	-	-	-	-	-	-	-	40°25'20.7"N	75°3'53.1"W

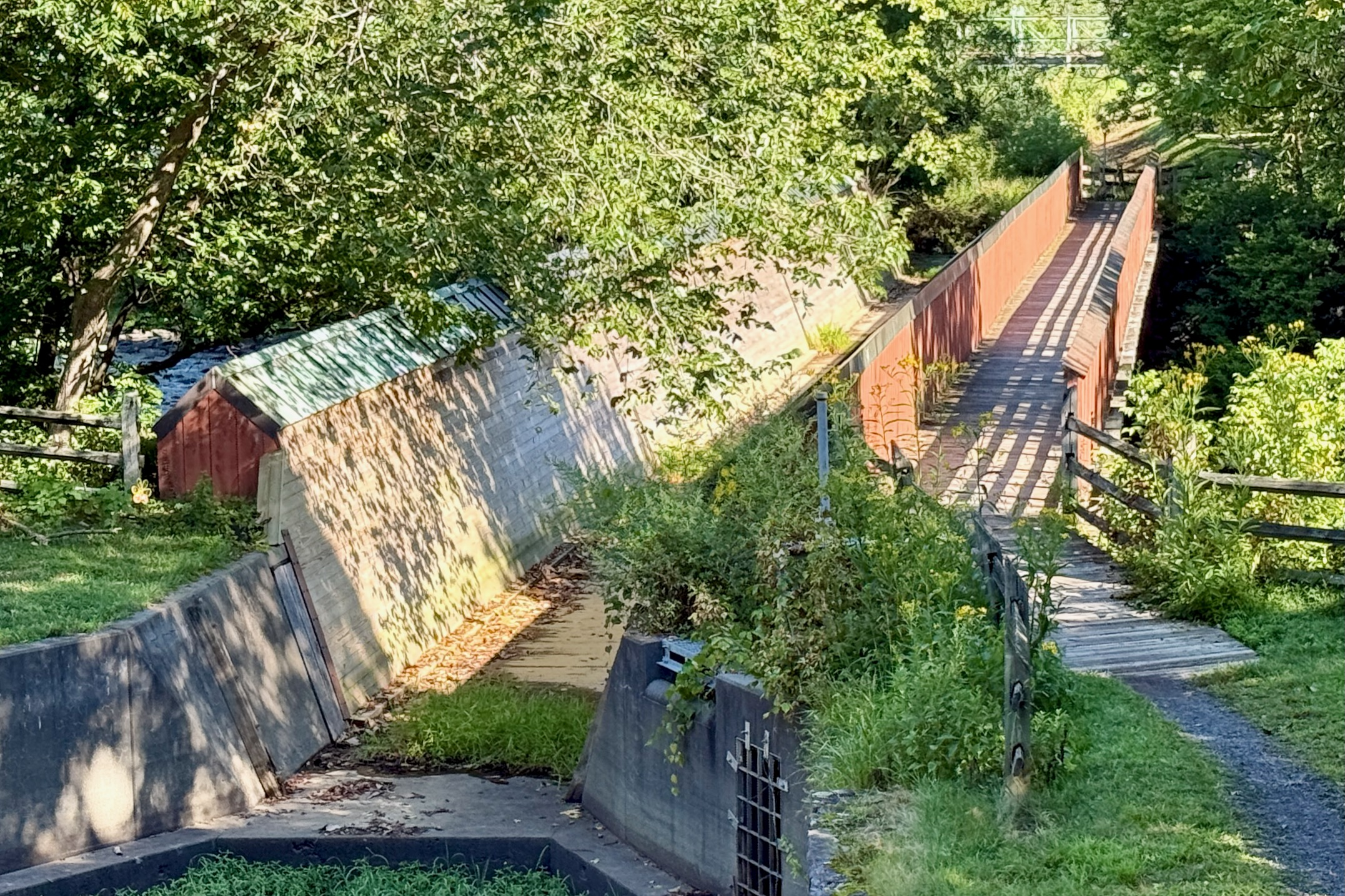
Tohickon Creek Aqueduct

== See also ==
- List of rivers of the United States
- List of rivers of Pennsylvania
- List of Delaware River tributaries
