= Lake Nockamixon =

Reservoir in Pennsylvania, United States

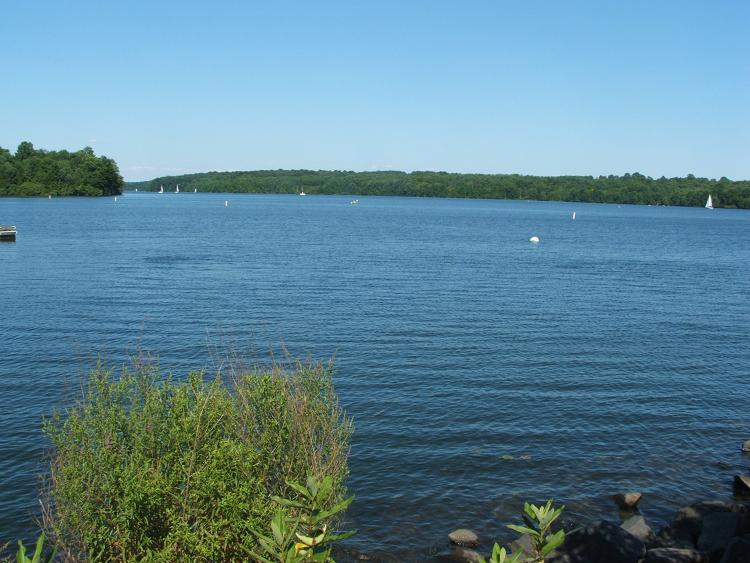
- view of the lake near the boat rentals

- Location within Pennsylvania Location within the United States
- Location: Bucks County, Pennsylvania
- Coordinates: 40°27′56″N 75°13′16″W
- Type: Reservoir
- Primary inflows: Tohickon Creek
- Primary outflows: Tohickon Creek
- Basin countries: United States
- Surface area: 1,420 acres (5.7 km^{2})
- Max. depth: 90 ft (27 m)
- Surface elevation: 390 ft (120 m)

Lake Nockamixon is a reservoir in southeastern Pennsylvania, United States, and the largest lake in Bucks County. It is formed by a dam on Tohickon Creek and is the centerpiece of Nockamixon State Park. Swimming is not allowed in the lake, but boating is popular. The park maintains a marina and a boat rental as well as three other boat-launch areas.

Sailboating is popular on the lake, with an active sail club organizing activities. Kayaking and small motor (up to 20 hp permitted) boating for fishing and recreation is also plentiful.

Fishing from boats and the bank is popular, and common species include striped bass, walleye, pickerel, carp, largemouth and smallmouth bass, muskellunge, and catfish. The water is stained by vegetation and has a very faint current, since the lake is part of the course of Tohickon Creek. It is also fed by two other creeks known as Haycock Run and Three Mile Run.

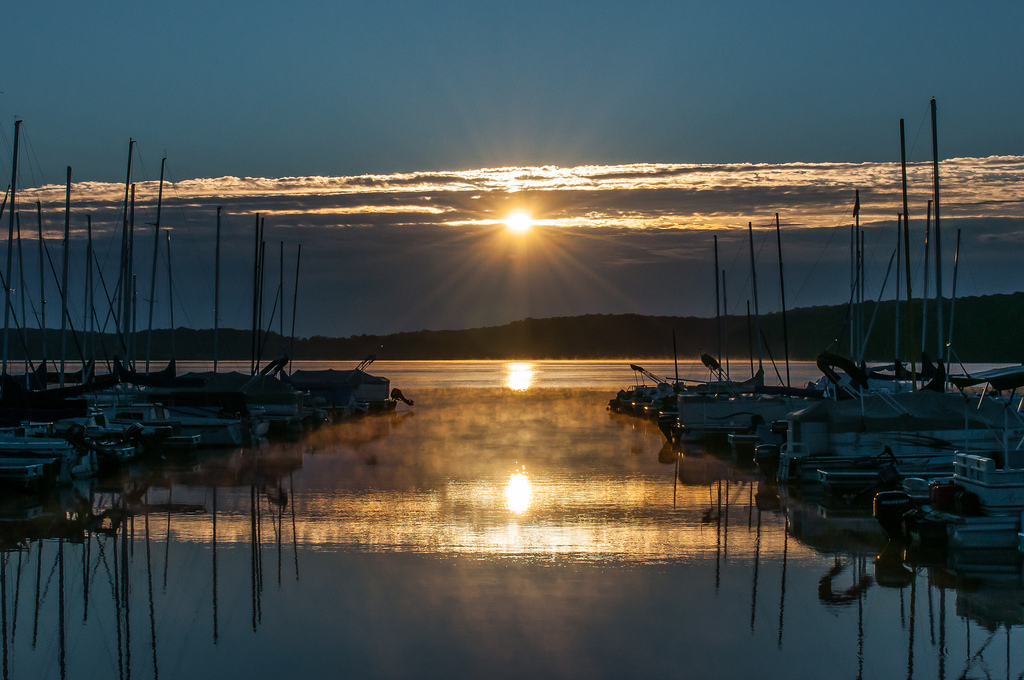
Lake Nockamixon Marina 2012

In the winter, the water sometimes freezes over, allowing for ice skating and ice fishing. The lake is surrounded by horse trails which provide for hiking as well.

Visitors to the lake can stay in one of several cabins, at the nearby Weisel Youth Hostel, or at one of the many local private campgrounds.

Water is released from the dam (assuming the reservoir has enough water) on the 3rd full weekend of March and the first full weekend of November to facilitate whitewater paddling on Tohickon Creek. The releases provide enough water to paddle all of the creek, from below the dam to confluence with the Delaware River. The most popular section is the last 3 miles, from Ralph Stover State Park to the Delaware River. Releases are timed to provide sufficient flows in that section from about 9 AM until 4 PM on both Saturday and Sunday.

== History ==
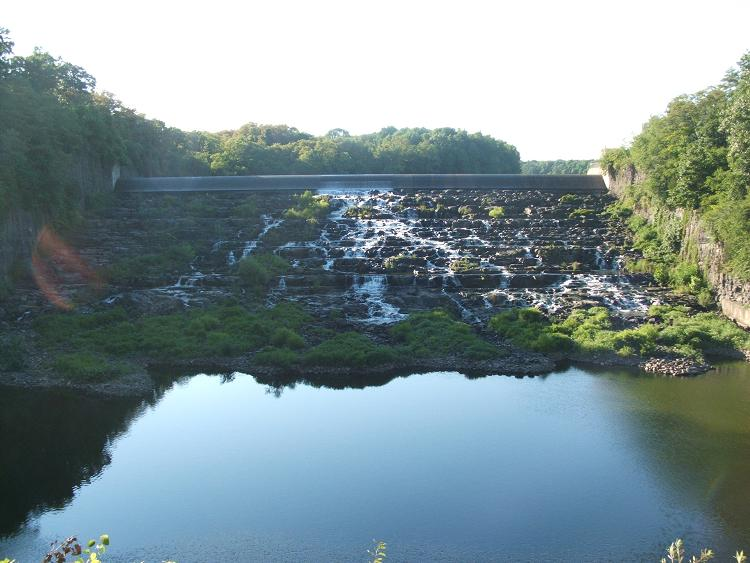
Tohickon Creek flowing out the dam forming Lake Nockamixon

Creation of the lake was first proposed by the Secretary of the Department of Forests and Water, Dr. Maurice K. Goddard, for recreational uses. It was originally to be called Tohickon Lake, after the creek, but its name was later changed to Nockamixon, meaning "place of soft soil" in the Lenape language. The park today contains several historic Native American sites.

Following its proposal in 1958, the dam was built by the Pennsylvania Department of Forests and Waters. The state park was opened to the public in December 1973.

In order to create the lake, the state bought 5,286 acres of what was known as the Tohickon Valley, including the community of Tohickon, and surrounding Bucks County areas.

== Climate ==
Hot-summer humid continental climate (Dfa)

Climate data for Lake Nockamixon, Bucks County, Pennsylvania (1981 – 2010 averages).
Month	Jan	Feb	Mar	Apr	May	Jun	Jul	Aug	Sep	Oct	Nov	Dec	Year
Mean daily maximum °F (°C)	37.6 (3.1)	41.1 (5.1)	49.6 (9.8)	61.9 (16.6)	71.8 (22.1)	80.2 (26.8)	84.3 (29.1)	82.6 (28.1)	75.8 (24.3)	64.4 (18.0)	53.3 (11.8)	41.8 (5.4)	62.1 (16.7)
Mean daily minimum °F (°C)	20.2 (−6.6)	22.1 (−5.5)	29.0 (−1.7)	38.8 (3.8)	48.4 (9.1)	57.9 (14.4)	62.7 (17.1)	61.2 (16.2)	53.2 (11.8)	41.9 (5.5)	33.4 (0.8)	24.9 (−3.9)	41.2 (5.1)
Average precipitation inches (mm)	3.51 (89)	2.86 (73)	3.75 (95)	4.19 (106)	4.25 (108)	4.33 (110)	5.01 (127)	4.05 (103)	4.46 (113)	4.49 (114)	3.79 (96)	4.15 (105)	48.84 (1,239)
Source: PRISM

The average annual snowfall total at Lake Nockamixon is greater than 24 inches (61 cm) but less than 36 inches (91 cm).
