= Deep Run (Tohickon Creek tributary) =

- Location of Deep Run

Location
- Country: United States
- State: Pennsylvania
- County: Bucks
- Township: Bedminster, Hilltown

Physical characteristics
- Source
  - coordinates: 40°21′45″N 75°11′37″W
  - elevation: 590 feet (180 m)
- Mouth
  - coordinates: 40°26′5″N 75°8′19″W
  - elevation: 276 feet (84 m)
- Length: 7.19 miles (11.57 km)
- Basin size: 10.2 square miles (26 km^{2})

Basin features
- Progression: Deep Run → Tohickon Creek → Delaware River → Delaware Bay
- River system: Delaware River
- Bridges: Pennsylvania Route 313 (South Dublin Pike); Smith School Road; Scott Road; Deep Run Road; Stone Bridge Road; Irish Meetinghouse Road; Hill Road; Kellers Church Road; Quarry Road; Rolling Hills Road; Pennsylvania Route 611 (Easton Road)
- Slope: 43.67 feet per mile (8.271 m/km)

Deep Run is a tributary of Tohickon Creek which is located in Bedminster Township, Bucks County, Pennsylvania, in the United States.

== History ==
Deep Run was so named by the first Irish settlers because it was deep compared to its width. The removal of trees at one time and erosion has lessened its depth.

The Deep Run Mennonite Church and Deep Run Presbyterian Church are located in the Deep Run Valley. The Deep Run schoolhouse dates to 1746 when land was deeded to the Mennonites for this purpose, the structure was a log building. It was first used as a meeting house, then when a second structure was built as a meeting house, the first one became a schoolhouse. It was torn down in 1842. The second schoolhouse was built circa 1844. German was taught exclusively until 1850.

== Statistics ==
Deep Run's GNIS identification number is 1173073, the Pennsylvania Gazetteer of Streams identification number is 03125. The watershed is 10.20 square miles (26.4 km^{2}), and it meets its confluence at the Tohickon Creek's 6.10 river mile. The headwaters of the stream is at an elevation of 590 feet (180 m) and the mouth is at an elevation of 276 feet (84 m), resulting in a slope of 43.67 feet per mile (8.271 m/km).

== Course ==
Deep Run rises just over a half mile south of Dublin west of Pennsylvania Route 313 (Dublin Pike) and is northeast oriented for a short distance where it turns northwest for about a mile, then turns again northeast until it meets with Tohickon Creek near Randts Mill, about a mile from Pipersville.

== Geology ==
- Appalachian Highlands Division
  - Piedmont Province
    - Gettysburg-Newark Lowland Section
      - Brunswick Formation

Deep Run lies in a band of the Brunswick Formation in the Newark basin formed during the Jurassic and Triassic. Consisting of mudstone, siltstone, reddish-brown shale and some green and some brown shale. Mineralogy includes argillite and hornfels.

== Crossings ==
Crossing	NBI Number	Length	Lanes	Spans	Material/Design	Built	Reconstructed	Latitude	Longitude
Pennsylvania Route 313 (South Dublin Pike)	-	-	-	-	-	-	-	-	-
Smith School Road	-	-	-	-	-	-	-	-	-
Scott Road	45289	8.2 metres (27 ft)	2	2	Steel culvert, bituminous surface	1977	2007	40°22'60"N	75°11'15"W
Deep Run Road	43574	6.7 metres (22 ft)	2	-	Concrete culvert	2006	-	40°22'60"N	75°11'18"W
Stone Bridge Road	-	-	-	-	-	-	-	-	-
Irish Meetinghouse Road	7077	56.7 metres (186 ft)	2	3	continuous steel stringer/multi-beam or girder	1950	2008	40°26'2"N	75°8'28"W
Hill Road	-	-	-	-	-	-	-	-	-
Kellers Church Road	45131	25 metres (82 ft)	2	-	Prestressed concrete box beam or girders-multiple, concrete cast-in-place deck, monolithic concrete surface	2009	-	40°24'45"N	75°10'32"W
Quarry Road	-	-	-	-	-	-	-	-	-
Rolling Hills Road	-	-	-	-	-	-	-	-	-
Pennsylvania Route 611 (Easton Road)	7077	20.1 metres (66 ft)	2	3	Continuous steel stringer mult-beam or girder, concrete cast-in-place deck	1950	2008	40°26'2"N	75°8'28"W

== See also ==
- List of rivers of the United States
- List of rivers of Pennsylvania
- List of Delaware River tributaries
