= Bedminster =

Bedminster may refer to:

== Places ==
- Bedminster, Bristol, England
  - Bedminster railway station, Bristol
- Bedminster, New Jersey, United States
  - Trump National Golf Club Bedminster, located in the town
- Bedminster Township, Bucks County, Pennsylvania, United States
  - Bedminster, Pennsylvania, United States
  - Bedminster Center, Bucks County, Pennsylvania, United States

== See also ==
- Bedminster Down, an area in Bishopsworth, Bristol
- Beaminster, Dorset, England
