= Kulps Corner, Pennsylvania =

Unincorporated community in Pennsylvania, US

- Unincorporated community
- Location within Pennsylvania Location within the United States
- Coordinates: 40°22′55″N 75°13′11″W
- Country: United States
- State: Pennsylvania
- County: Bucks
- Township: Bedminster and Hilltown
- Elevation: 469 ft (143 m)
- Time zone: UTC-5 (Eastern (EST))
  - Summer (DST): UTC-4 (EDT)
- ZIP code: 18944
- Area codes: 215, 267 and 445
- GNIS feature ID: 1203968

Kulps Corner is an unincorporated community in Bucks County, Pennsylvania, United States. Kulps Corner is located at the intersection of Pennsylvania State Routes 113 and 313 on the border of Bedminster and Hilltown townships.
