= Deer Run =

Deer Run may refer to:

- Deer Run, Calgary, Canada
- Deer Run (Tohickon Creek), a tributary of the Tohickon Creek in Bedminster Township, Bucks County, Pennsylvania, United States
- Deer Squad, a Chinese TV series formerly titled Deer Run
