= Fountainville =

Fountainville may refer to the following places in the United States:

- Fountainville, Georgia, unincorporated community in Macon County
- Fountainville, Pennsylvania, unincorporated community in Bucks County
