= Stover-Myers Mill =

- U.S. National Register of Historic Places
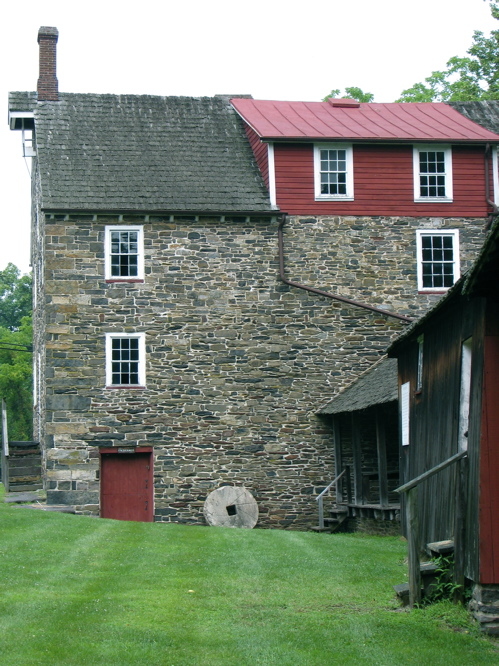
- Stover-Myers Mill

- Location within Pennsylvania Location within the United States
- Location: North of Pipersville on Dark Hollow Road, Bedminster Township, Pipersville, Pennsylvania
- Coordinates: 40°26′15″N 75°7′26″W
- Area: 26 acres (110,000 m^{2})
- Built: 1800
- NRHP reference No.: 78002357
- Added to NRHP: September 13, 1978

The Stover-Myers Mill is a watermill located on the Tohickon Creek in Bedminster Township, Bucks County, Pennsylvania. It is listed on the National Register of Historic Places in 1978.

The mill was built around 1800 and operated continuously until 1955. The mill was built by Jacob Stover and it used a millstone to grind flour and feed for livestock using power from a waterwheel. The mill was also equipped with an up-and-down saw and it operated as a lumber mill. Later, the mill was renovated by Christian Myers in 1885. With the advent of steam power, the mill was eventually augmented with a steam engine. Milling of flour ceased in 1920, primarily due to competition from Mid-Western states, and the mill closed in 1955. The property was purchased by Bucks County in 1967 and the mill currently resides in a 26-acre (11 ha) park that is open to the public.
