= Bedminster Township =

Bedminster Township may refer to:

- Bedminster Township, New Jersey
- Bedminster Township, Pennsylvania
