= Elephant, Pennsylvania =

Human settlement in Pennsylvania, United States

Coordinates: 40°25′29″N 75°14′30″W

Elephant is an unincorporated community in Bedminster Township, Bucks County, Pennsylvania, United States, on the southeastern side of Lake Nockamixon. It is two miles northeast of the junction of Pennsylvania Routes 313 and 563. It is also a four building town, which includes a barn that has collapsed It is served by the Perkasie post office, which uses the Zip Code of 18944.
