= Mink Run (Tohickon Creek tributary) =

Mink Run Rabbit Run
- Mink Run

Location
- Country: United States
- State: Pennsylvania
- County: Bucks
- Township: Bedminster

Physical characteristics
- Source
  - coordinates: 40°27′0″N 75°11′52″W
  - elevation: 397 feet (121 m)
- Mouth
  - coordinates: 40°26′35″N 75°9′46″W
  - elevation: 282 feet (86 m)
- Length: 2.05 miles (3.30 km)
- Basin size: 2.10 square miles (5.4 km^{2})

Basin features
- Progression: Mink Run → Tohickon Creek → Delaware River → Delaware Bay
- River system: Delaware River
- Bridges: Sweetbriar Road; Fretz Valley Road; Deer Run Road; Farm School Road
- Slope: 56.1 feet per mile (10.63 m/km)

Mink Run (Rabbit Run) is a tributary of the Tohickon Creek in Bedminster Township, Bucks County, Pennsylvania in the United States.

== Statistics ==
Mink Run rises just east of Fairview Road in Bedminster Township and is part of the Delaware River watershed. Its GNIS identification number is 1181342 and was entered into the GNIS system on 2 August 1797, its Pennsylvania Department of Environmental Resources identification number is 03145, has a watershed of 2.1 square miles (5.4 km^{2}), and it meets its confluence at the Tohickon Creek's 8.01 river mile.

== Course ==
Mink Run begins about 1.3 miles (2.1 km) southeast of Lake Nockamixon at an elevation of 397 feet (121 m) and runs about 1.4 miles (2.3 km) where it turns south-southeast and picks up two tributaries, one on either side, after flowing another 0.5 miles (0.80 km) mile it shares its mouth with Deer Run at an elevation of 282 feet (86 m). Its average slope is 56.1 feet per mile (10.63 m/km) Wolf Run meets the Tohickon only a couple hundred feet downstream of Mink Run's confluence.

== Geology ==
- Appalachian Highlands Division
  - Piedmont Province
    - Gettysburg-Newark Lowland Section
      - Brunswick Formation

Wolf Run lies within the Brunswick Formation in the Newark Basin laid down during the Jurassic and the Triassic. Rocks includes mudstone, siltstone, and reddish-brown, green, and brown shale. Mineralogy includes red and dark-gray argillite and hornfels.

== Crossings and Bridges ==
- Farm School Road
- Deer Run Road
- Fretz Valley Road
- Sweetbriar Road

== See also ==
- List of rivers of Pennsylvania
