= Pearl S. Buck House =

Historic house in Pennsylvania, United States

- Green Hills Farm
- U.S. National Register of Historic Places
- U.S. National Historic Landmark
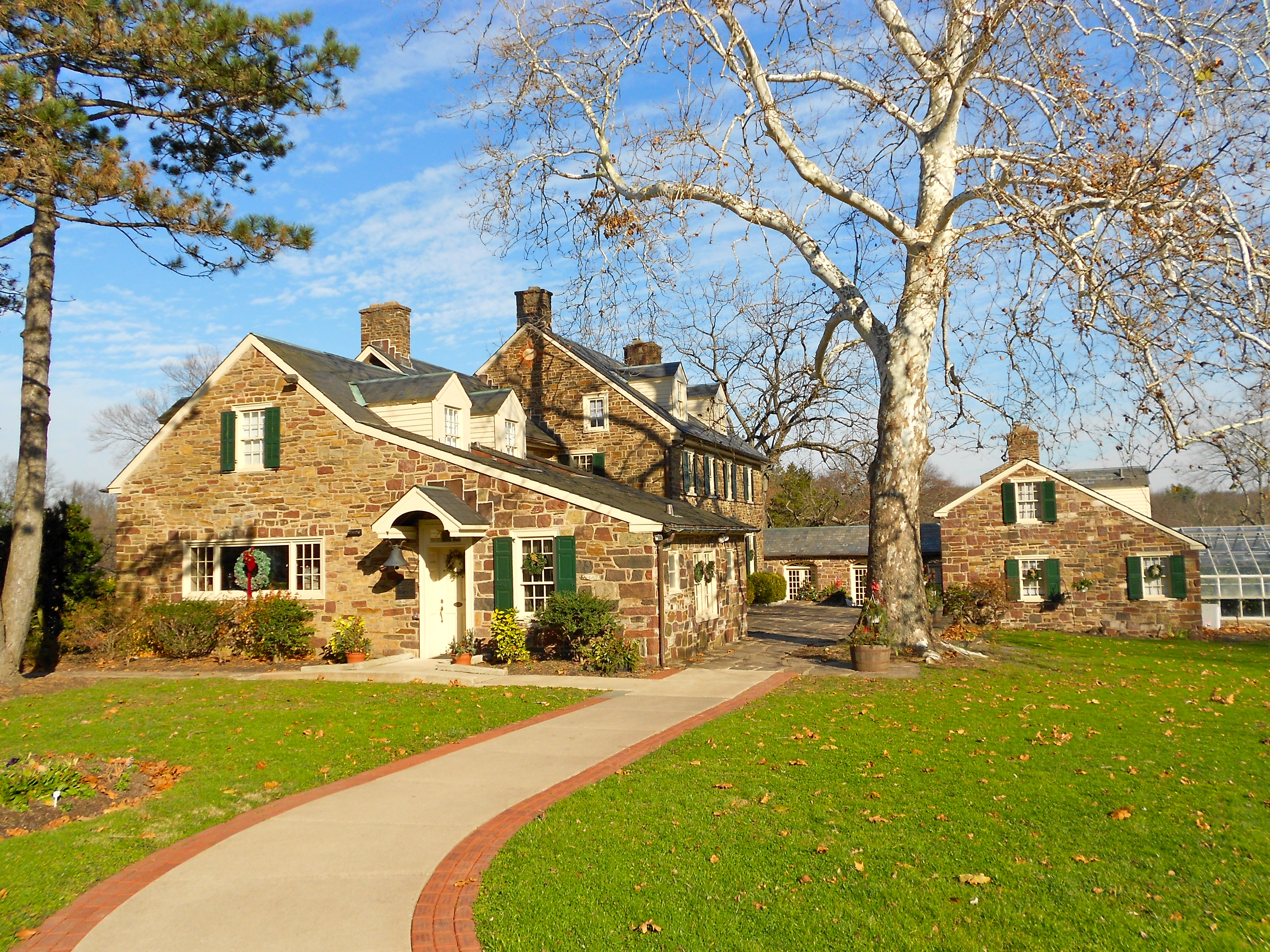

- Location within Pennsylvania Location within the United States
- Nearest city: Dublin, Pennsylvania
- Coordinates: 40°21′36″N 75°13′11″W
- Built: 1933
- NRHP reference No.: 74001755

Significant dates
- Added to NRHP: February 27, 1974
- Designated NHL: January 16, 1980

The Pearl S. Buck House, formerly known as Green Hills Farm, is the 67-acre homestead in Bucks County, Pennsylvania, where Nobel Prize-winning American author Pearl Buck lived for 40 years, raising her family, writing, pursuing humanitarian interests, and gardening. She purchased the house in 1933 and lived there until the late 1960s, when she moved to Danby, Vermont. She completed many works while on the farm, including This Proud Heart (1938), The Patriot (1939), Today and Forever (1941), and The Child Who Never Grew (1950). The farm, a National Historic Landmark, is located on Dublin Road southwest of Dublin, Pennsylvania. It is now a museum open to the public.

== Overview ==
The Pearl S. Buck House at Green Hills Farm, an example of 19th century (built 1825) Pennsylvanian architecture, is constructed of coursed fieldstone. It is four bays wide and two deep with the main entrance located in the second bay. Two gable dormers are located on the front and rear slope of the roof. Chimneys are located on each gable end. When Buck purchased the farmstead, she made extensive alterations and additions to the 19th century farmhouse, including a two-story fieldstone wing added to the east gable and two libraries. Today, visitors can tour twelve rooms of the home and visit the pre-Revolutionary War cottage on the property and the barn built in 1827.

In the large library, two Pennsylvania jugs serve as lamp bases upon a hand carved Chinese hardwood desk, at which Buck wrote her breakthrough novel The Good Earth. Buck filled her home with works of original art by Chen Chi and Freeman Elliot, iron works of art produced by exiled artisans in China, Peking Fetti carpets that survived revolutions in China, and some of her own sculptures.

The house underwent restoration from 2007 to 2013.

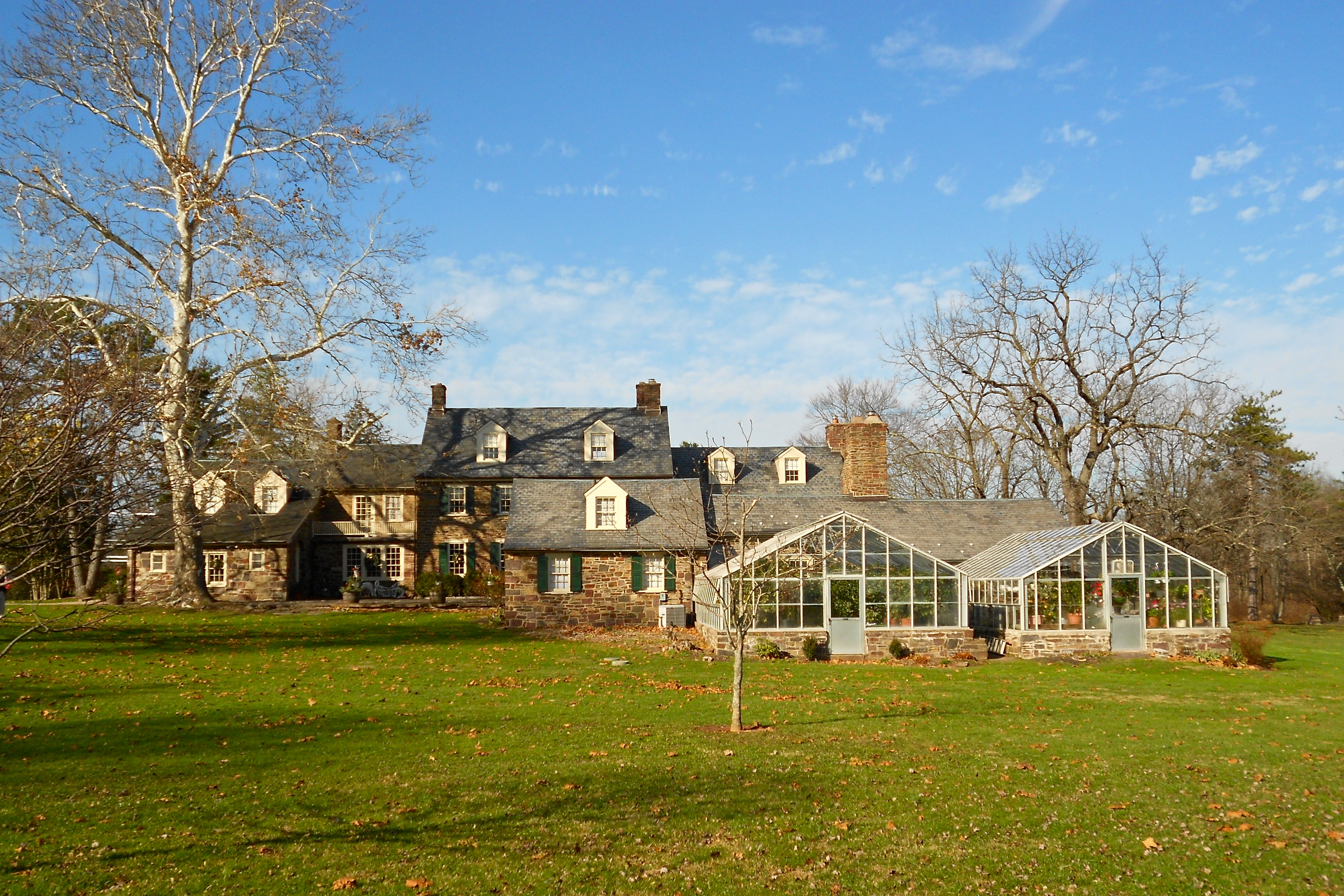
House

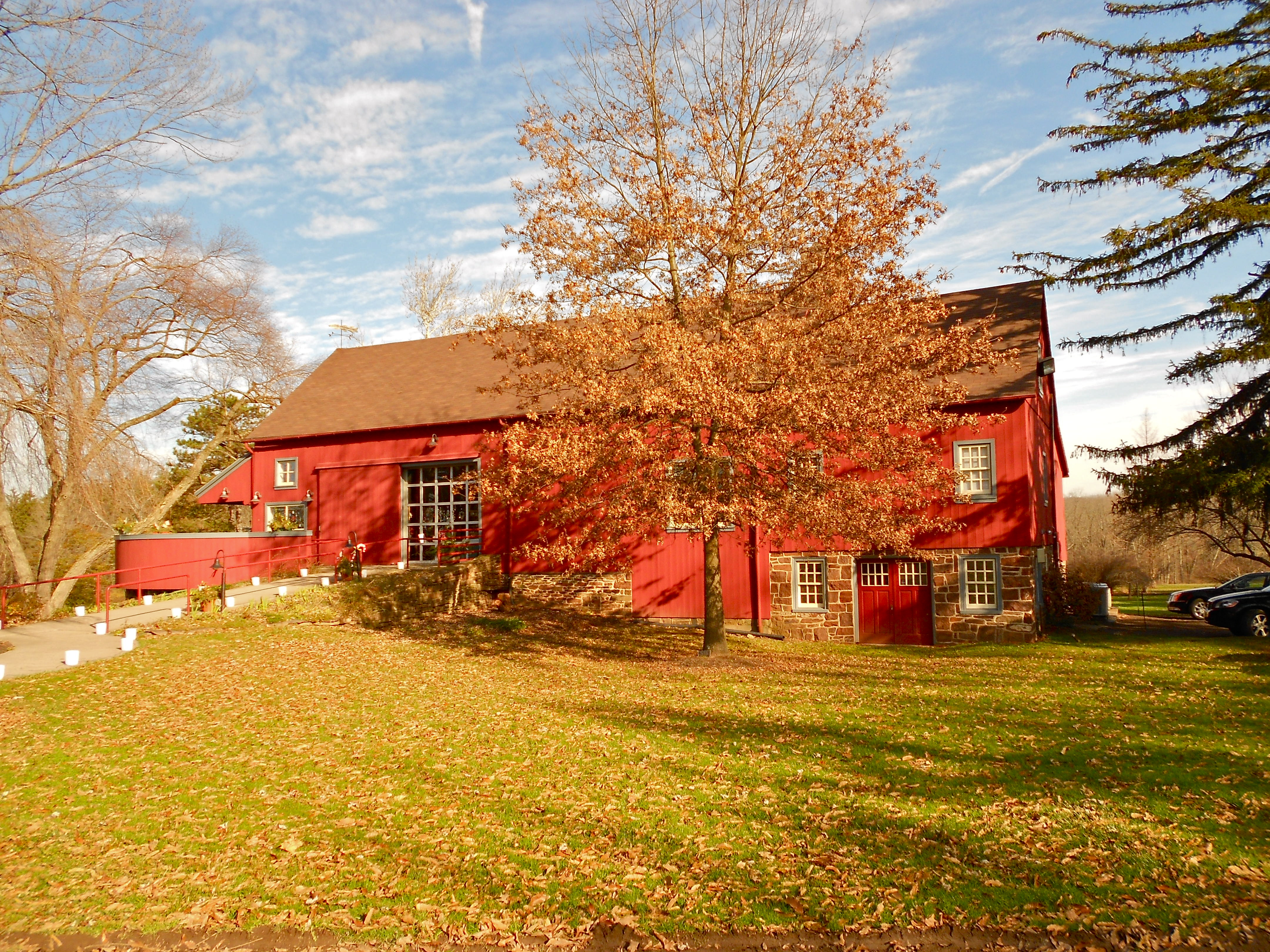
Barn

== Museum and tours ==
The Pearl Buck house is open to the public for daily tours seven days a week. Pearl S. Buck International currently offers two house tours to visitors: Pearl S. Buck: Taking Action, which focuses on Ms. Buck's activism and human rights advocacy, and the more traditional biographical and historic Pearl S. Buck: Life and Legacy Tour. In May 2020, Pearl S. Buck International's project of developing and implementing the Taking Action tour was named a 2020 recipient of the Award of Excellence by the American Association for State and Local History (AASLH).

=== Accreditation ===
In October 2021, the Accreditation Commission of the American Alliance of Museums (AAM), the only organization representing the entire scope of the museum community, awarded the Pearl S. Buck House accreditation. Of the nation's estimated 33,000 museums, 1,095 are currently accredited.

== National Historic Landmark designation ==
The Pearl S. Buck House was designated a National Historic Landmark in 1980 and opened as a museum the same year. As of 2018, there were only 300 National Historic Landmarks dedicated to upholding the legacy of a woman. Of that number, the Pearl S. Buck House is one of only 10 with an intact collection.

Approximately 17,000 people visit each year. It sits on over 67 acres of lawns, gardens and ponds.

== Pearl S. Buck International ==
Pearl S. Buck International is the organization that owns and operates the Pearl S. Buck House National Historic Landmark. Pearl S. Buck International is a 501(c)(3) charitable nonprofit organization founded by writer, activist and humanitarian Pearl S. Buck. Pearl S. Buck International carries on Ms. Buck's legacy through intercultural education, the Pearl Buck House museum and tours, and humanitarian aid.

== See also ==
- List of National Historic Landmarks in Pennsylvania
- National Register of Historic Places listings in Bucks County, Pennsylvania
- List of residences of American writers
