= Pennridge School District =

School district in Pennsylvania, USA

Address
- 1200 North 5th Street Perkasie, Pennsylvania, 18944; United States

District information
- Type: Public
- Grades: K–12
- NCES District ID: 4218750

Students and staff
- Students: 6,797 (2020–2021)
- Teachers: 460.8 (on an FTE basis)
- Staff: 866.0 (on an FTE basis)
- Student–teacher ratio: 14.75:1

Other information
- Website: www.pennridge.org

Pennridge High School

Location
- 1228 North Fifth Street; Perkasie, (Bucks County), Pennsylvania 18944; United States; 40.395729°N 75.262672°W

Information
- Type: Public high school
- Principal: Abram Hughes
- Staff: 132.60 (FTE)
- Enrollment: 2,155 (2023-24)
- Student to teacher ratio: 16.25
- Colors: Green and white
- Nickname: Rams

The Pennridge School District is located approximately 30 miles (48 km) north of Philadelphia in Bucks County, Pennsylvania.

== The District ==
The Pennridge School District was founded in 1952 when several small municipal school districts, including the Sell-Perk School District, merged together. The district covers approximately 95 square miles (250 km^{2}), with a total population of 45,000, and encompasses eight municipalities, including the boroughs of Dublin, Perkasie, Sellersville, and Silverdale. Bedminster, East Rockhill, Hilltown, and West Rockhill townships also are included.

== Schools ==
The former Sell-Perk High School was converted to its present use as South Middle School. Today, the district operates 11 schools:

=== Elementary schools ===
- Bedminster
- Robert B. Deibler
- John M. Grasse
- Patricia A. Guth
- Sellersville
- Margaret M. Seylar
- West Rockhill

=== Middle schools ===
- Central Middle School
- South Middle School
- North Middle School

=== High school ===
- Pennridge High School

There are approximately 7,200 students enrolled in the district. The district employs 478 teachers and over 450 additional staff, including part-time members.

== Athletics ==
All Pennridge School sports compete in the Suburban One League - Continental Conference using the ram as a mascot and green, white and occasionally black for colors. The Varsity Football team historically plays all of their home games at Poppy Yoder Field, a stadium on the grounds of South Middle School. South was formerly known as Sell-Perk High (before Pennridge was formed) and still has its roots embedded in the community. Since October 2008, a turf field has been in use on the grounds of the high school. Lacrosse, soccer, field hockey, track and field, and JV and freshmen football use the turf field. There have been talks to renovate Poppy Yoder and possibly complete the stadium at the high school. Poppy Yoder field is no longer in use and now the football team and other high school sports play at Helman Field which is located behind the high school. In recent years, many of the sport teams have had great success. The women's soccer team was conference and District 1 champions in 2011. They were also PIAA Class AAA State Runners-up. In 2009 they were District 1 Champions. The boys' volleyball team was also conference champions, District 1 champions, and PIAA Class AAA State Runners-up. In 2022, the boys' ice hockey team was the SHSHL Varsity AA Champions.

== Growth and development ==
Pennridge’s administration has had to be very adaptable in recent years as the Pennridge area population continues to grow as an ongoing effect of urban sprawl from Philadelphia. In 1996 the new Central Middle School was added to accommodate rising enrollments and since then, most of the district's elementary schools have undergone expansion and renovation projects. Pennridge has recently built a multimillion-dollar expansion to the current building on the high school campus, which includes a new gymnasium, natatorium, and cafeteria. Construction of a new auditorium, seating approximately 1200, and renovation of the school's older sections, followed, being completed February 2007. Demolition of the oldest building on campus, the Lower House, began on August 15, 2006 due to the futility of renovation. The building that was the Freshman Center became North Middle School after the High School construction was completed.

National attention was briefly drawn to Pennridge School District in 2018 as 225 students walked out March, 2018 to honor the dead from the Marjory Stoneman Douglas High School shooting and call for stricter gun laws. The district gave Saturday detentions to these students, who then used the occasion to stage further protests which garnered widespread attention.

== Notable alumni ==
- Jake Crouthamel, former Syracuse University athletic director
- Paul Clymer, PA House of Representatives
- Tom Fulp, Newgrounds creator
- Sam Hollenbach, Former NFL player
- Robb Riddick, former NFL player
- Louis Riddick, former NFL player and current ESPN Analyst
- Tim Lewis, former NFL player and current NFL assistant coach
- Bill Mensch, founder, chairman and CEO of the Western Design Center
- Dean Sabatino, The Dead Milkmen drummer
- Chris Collingwood, Fountains of Wayne lead singer
- Will Lewis, former NFL Player and Vice President of Football Operations for the Seattle Seahawks
- Beverly Lynne, Hard-core film actress
- Ryan Zamroz, former basketball player
- Brittany Furlan, Internet personality
