= Mount Pleasant, Bucks County, Pennsylvania =

Unincorporated community in Pennsylvania, US

Mount Pleasant, Pennsylvania
- Unincorporated community
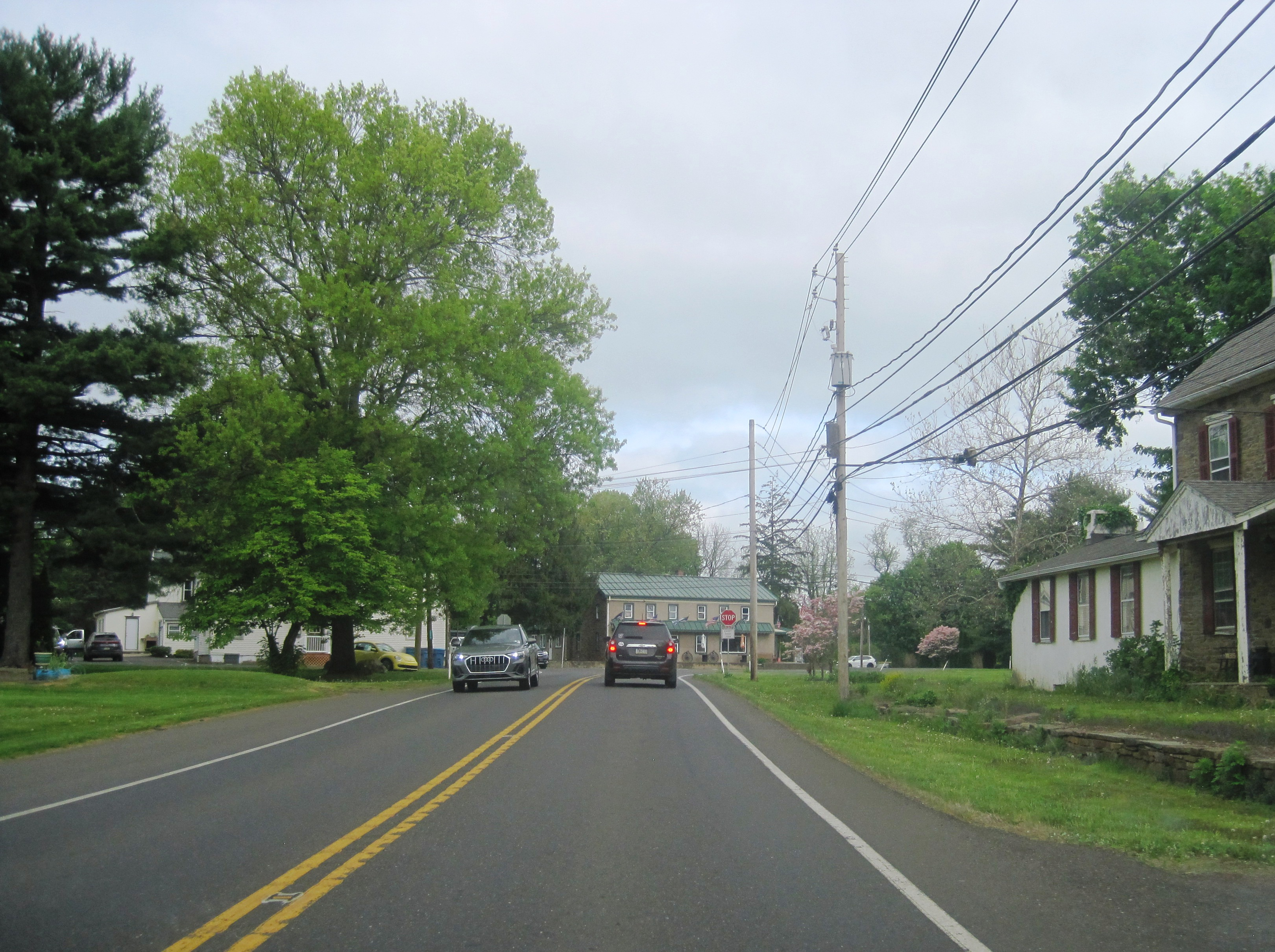
- Mt. Pleasant along northbound PA 152

- Location within Pennsylvania Location within the United States
- Coordinates: 40°19′49″N 75°14′16″W
- Country: United States
- State: Pennsylvania
- County: Bucks
- Township: Hilltown
- Elevation: 682 ft (208 m)
- Time zone: UTC-5 (Eastern (EST))
  - Summer (DST): UTC-4 (EDT)
- Area codes: 215, 267 and 445
- GNIS feature ID: 1204229

For the borough in Westmoreland County, Pennsylvania, see Mount Pleasant, Pennsylvania

Mount Pleasant is an unincorporated community in Hilltown Township in Bucks County, Pennsylvania, United States. Mount Pleasant is located at the intersection of Pennsylvania Route 152 and Hilltown Pike.
