= Bedminster, Pennsylvania =

Unincorporated community in Pennsylvania, US

- Unincorporated community
- Location within Pennsylvania Location within the United States
- Coordinates: 40°25′33″N 75°10′45″W
- Country: United States
- State: Pennsylvania
- County: Bucks
- Township: Bedminster
- Elevation: 427 ft (130 m)
- Time zone: UTC-5 (Eastern (EST))
  - Summer (DST): UTC-4 (EDT)
- ZIP code: 18910
- Area codes: 215, 267 and 445
- GNIS feature ID: 1169087

Bedminster is an unincorporated community in Bedminster Township in Bucks County, Pennsylvania, United States. Bedminster is located at the intersection of Pennsylvania Route 113 and Kellers Church Road.

== History ==
Originally known as Bedminsterville, a post office was established on 7 April 1851, with Elias Ott as the first postmaster. In the days of mail coaches, Bedminster was visited three times a week from Doylestown. One of its earliest industries was chairmaking in the late 1800s by Reuben Stever. Established in 1834 by Abraham Freidlich, a major landmark in Bedminster has been the general store. Later, the store was managed by the Scheetz brothers. in 1855, Levi Michley took the store, followed by Peter O. Mickley, who left the business in 1860 when he became township assessor. Also in 1860, Isaac Fluck replaced it with a new and larger store. Levi C. Hafler became proprietor, becoming partners with J.H. Afflerbach until 1868, when Hafler retired. In 1870, the business was named J. H. Afflerbach & Co. when Abraham Keller entered into partnership with Afflerbach. Afflerbach retired in 1873, then the store became Keller & Son, when Abraham partnered with his son Lewis. In 1875, the store was renamed Keller and Brother as a partnership between Lewis and Joseph M. Keller. Joseph retired in 1878. In the evening of 2 October 1886, the entire store, furniture depot and several small buildings were completely destroyed by fire. Lewis Keller rebuilt a large country store at the same location.

== Geography ==
Bedminster is located in the Deep Run watershed between the north branch and the main branch of the creek.
