= Deer Run (Tohickon Creek tributary) =

- Deer Run

Location
- Country: United States
- State: Pennsylvania
- County: Bucks
- Township: Bedminster

Physical characteristics
- Source
  - coordinates: 40°26′23″N 75°12′50″W
  - elevation: 390 feet (120 m)
- Mouth
  - coordinates: 40°26′35″N 75°9′46″W
  - elevation: 282 feet (86 m)
- Length: 3.89 miles (6.26 km)
- Basin size: 5.51 square miles (14.3 km^{2})

Basin features
- Progression: Deer Run → Tohickon Creek → Delaware River → Delaware Bay
- River system: Delaware River
- Bridges: Sweetbriar Road; Center School Road; Center School Road; Fretz Valley Road; Creamery Road; Rolling Hills Road; Deer Run Road
- Slope: 27.76 feet per mile (5.258 m/km)

Deer Run is a tributary of the Tohickon Creek in Bedminster Township, Bucks County, Pennsylvania in the United States.

== Statistics ==
Deer Run is contained wholly within Bedminster Township and is part of the Delaware River watershed. It's GNIS identification number is 1192341, the PA Department of Environmental Resources identification number is 03142. Its watershed is 5.51 square miles (14.3 km^{2}). It meets its confluence at the Tohickon Creek's 8.00 river mile.

== Course ==
Deer Run rises in Bedminster Township about 2.5 miles (4.0 km) east northeast of Elephant at an elevation of 390 feet (120 m). It is, at first, south southeast oriented for about 1 mile (1.6 km) where it picks up an unnamed tributary from the south, and it turns and flows generally northeast for about 0.78 miles (1.26 km) where it receives an unnamed tributary on the left, then continues for another 1.8 miles (2.9 km) where it shares its confluence with Mink Run at the Tohickon Creek at an elevation of 282 feet (86 m), resulting in an average slope of 27.76 feet per mile (5.258 m/km). Its mouth is only about 200 feet (61 m) upstream from Wolf Run.

== Geology ==
- Appalachian Highlands Division
  - Piedmont Province
    - Gettysburg-Newark Lowland Section
      - Brunswick Formation

Wolf Run lies within the Brunswick Formation in the Newark Basin laid down during the Jurassic and the Triassic. Rocks includes mudstone, siltstone, and reddish-brown, green, and brown shale. Mineralogy includes red and dark-gray argillite and hornfels.

== Crossings and Bridges ==
- Deer Run Road
- Rolling Hills Road
- Creamery Road
- Fretz Valley Road
- Center School Road
- Center School Road
- Sweetbriar Road

== See also ==
- List of rivers of Pennsylvania
