= Hilltown Township, Pennsylvania =

Township in Pennsylvania, US

Hilltown Township
- Township
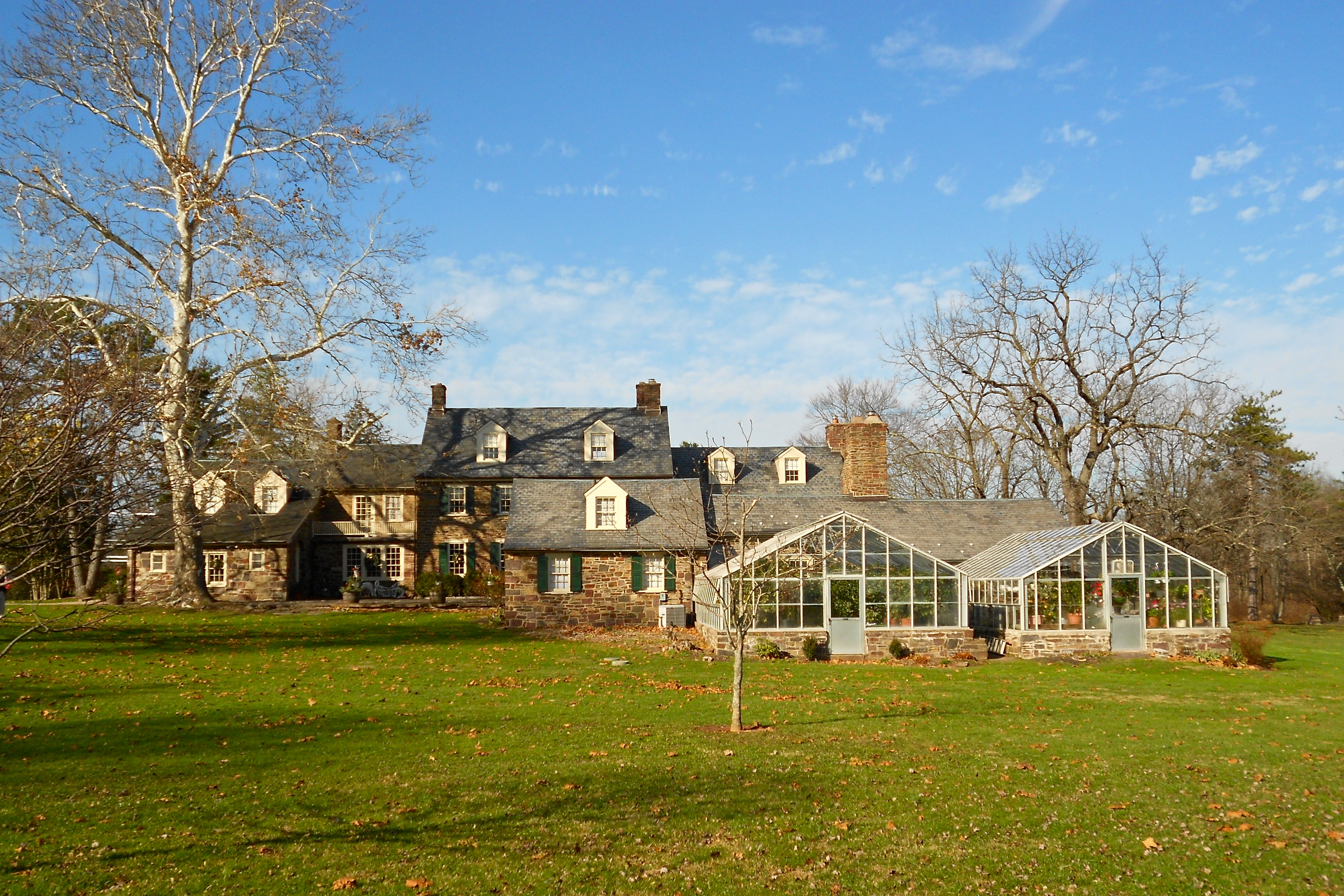
- Green Hills, home of Pearl Buck

- Seal

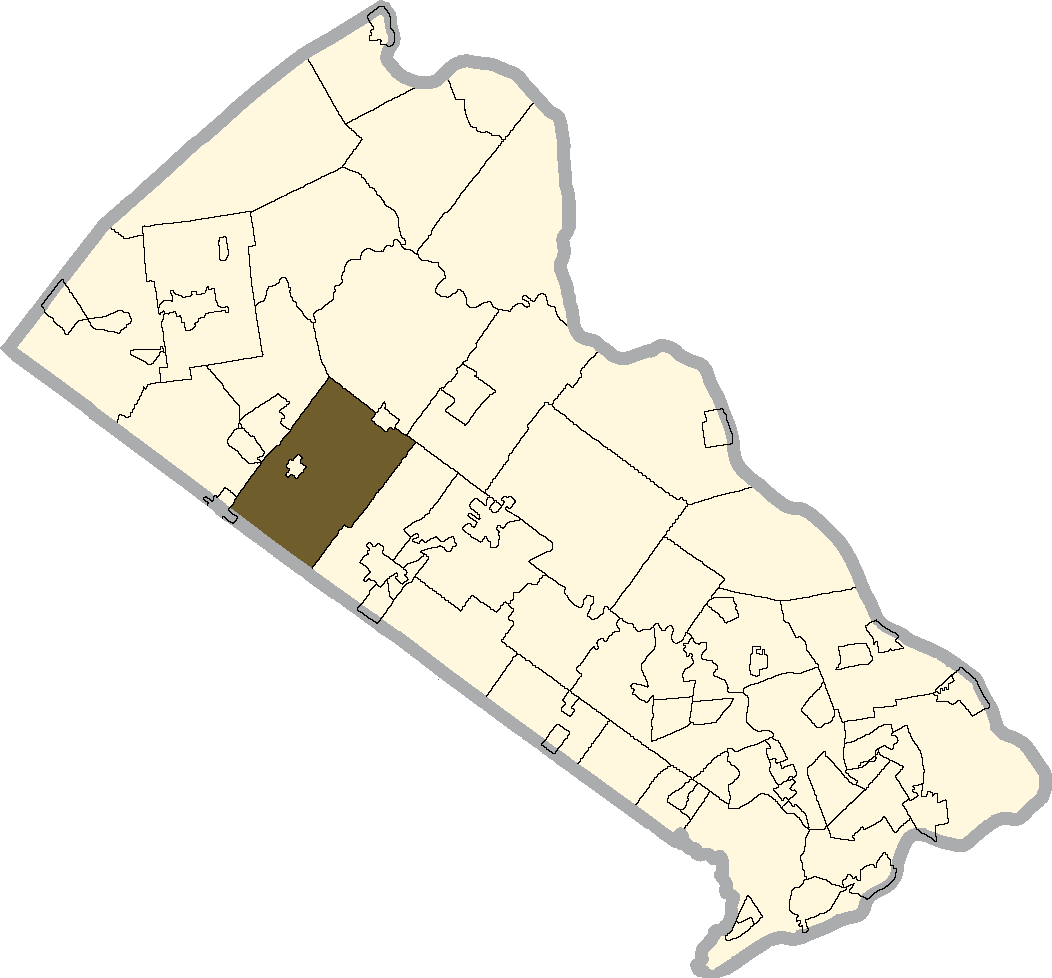
- Location of Hilltown Township in Bucks County

- Location in Pennsylvania and the United States Hilltown Township (the United States)
- Coordinates: 40°22′36″N 75°15′05″W
- Country: United States
- State: Pennsylvania
- County: Bucks

Area
  - Total: 27.03 sq mi (70.0 km^{2})
  - Land: 26.97 sq mi (69.9 km^{2})
  - Water: 0.07 sq mi (0.18 km^{2})
- Elevation: 397 ft (121 m)

Population (2010)
  - Total: 15,029
  - Estimate (2016): 15,243
  - Density: 557.2/sq mi (215.2/km^{2})
- Time zone: UTC-5 (EST)
  - Summer (DST): UTC-4 (EDT)
- ZIP code: 18927
- Area codes: 215, 267 and 445
- FIPS code: 42-017-34952
- Website: www.hilltown.org

Hilltown Township is a township in Bucks County, Pennsylvania, United States. The population was 15,029 at the 2010 census. Most of Hilltown is part of Pennridge School District, while a small portion in Line Lexington is part of North Penn School District.

== History ==
The Uneek Havana Cigar Company at Blooming Glen and Green Hills Farm are listed on the National Register of Historic Places. Green Hills Farm is also designated a National Historic Landmark. The Reuben and Elizabeth Strassburger Farmstead, owned by the Hilltown Historical Society is also listed on the National Register of Historic Places. It consists of three pre-Civil War buildings, each containing museum-like interiors.

== Geography ==
According to the United States Census Bureau, the township has a total area of 26.9 square miles (70 km^{2}), all land. It is located in the Delaware watershed and is drained by the East Branch Perkiomen Creek and Neshaminy Creek.

Its villages include Bean, Bethon, Blooming Glen, Deep Run, Fair Hill, Fricks, Griers Corner (also in Bedminster and Plumstead Townships,) Hilltown, Keystone Point, Kulps Corner (also in Bedminster Township), Leidytown, Line Lexington (also in New Britain Township and Montgomery County,) Loux Corner (Albrights Corner), Mount Pleasant, Naces Corner, New Galena, Pennville, Snoveltown, Thomas Corner, and Unionville (also in Montgomery County).

Natural features in the township include Deep Run, Hardiaken Creek, Mill Creek, Perkiomen Creek (East Branch), and Pleasant Spring Creek.

=== Neighboring municipalities ===
- New Britain Township (southeast)
- Plumstead Township (east)
- Bedminster Township (northeast)
- Dublin (northeast)
- East Rockhill Township (north)
- Perkasie (northwest)
- Sellersville (northwest)
- West Rockhill Township (west)
- Telford (west)
- Souderton, Montgomery County (southwest)
- Franconia Township, Montgomery County (southwest)
- Hatfield Township, Montgomery County (south)

Hilltown Township surrounds the borough of Silverdale.

== Demographics ==
Historical population
Census	Pop.	Note	%±
1930	2,808		—
1940	3,182		13.3%
1950	3,688		15.9%
1960	5,549		50.5%
1970	7,281		31.2%
1980	9,326		28.1%
1990	10,582		13.5%
2000	12,102		14.4%
2010	15,029		24.2%
2020	16,284		8.4%

As of the 2010 census, the township was 92.7% White, 2.0% Black or African American, 0.1% Native American, 3.1% Asian, 0.1% Native Hawaiian, and 1.3% were two or more races. 2.8% of the population were of Hispanic or Latino ancestry.

As of the census of 2000, there were 12,102 people, 4,275 households, and 3,390 families residing in the township. The population density was 449.7 inhabitants per square mile (173.6/km^{2}). There were 4,370 housing units at an average density of 162.4 per square mile (62.7/km^{2}). The racial makeup of the township was 95.94% White, 1.54% African American, 0.09% Native American, 1.08% Asian, 0.02% Pacific Islander, 0.33% from other races, and 0.99% from two or more races. Hispanic or Latino of any race were 1.46% of the population.

There were 4,275 households, out of which 37.5% had children under the age of 18 living with them, 69.1% were married couples living together, 7.0% had a female householder with no husband present, and 20.7% were non-families. 16.4% of all households were made up of individuals, and 6.8% had someone living alone who was 65 years of age or older. The average household size was 2.81 and the average family size was 3.17.

In the township the population was spread out, with 27.2% under the age of 18, 6.1% from 18 to 24, 30.6% from 25 to 44, 24.1% from 45 to 64, and 12.1% who were 65 years of age or older. The median age was 37 years. For every 100 females, there were 97.5 males. For every 100 females age 18 and over, there were 94.4 males.

The median income for a household in the township was $63,178, and the median income for a family was $69,183. Males had a median income of $46,145 versus $30,566 for females. The per capita income for the township was $25,800. About 3.3% of families and 4.1% of the population were below the poverty line, including 4.8% of those under age 18 and 3.6% of those age 65 or over.

== Transportation ==
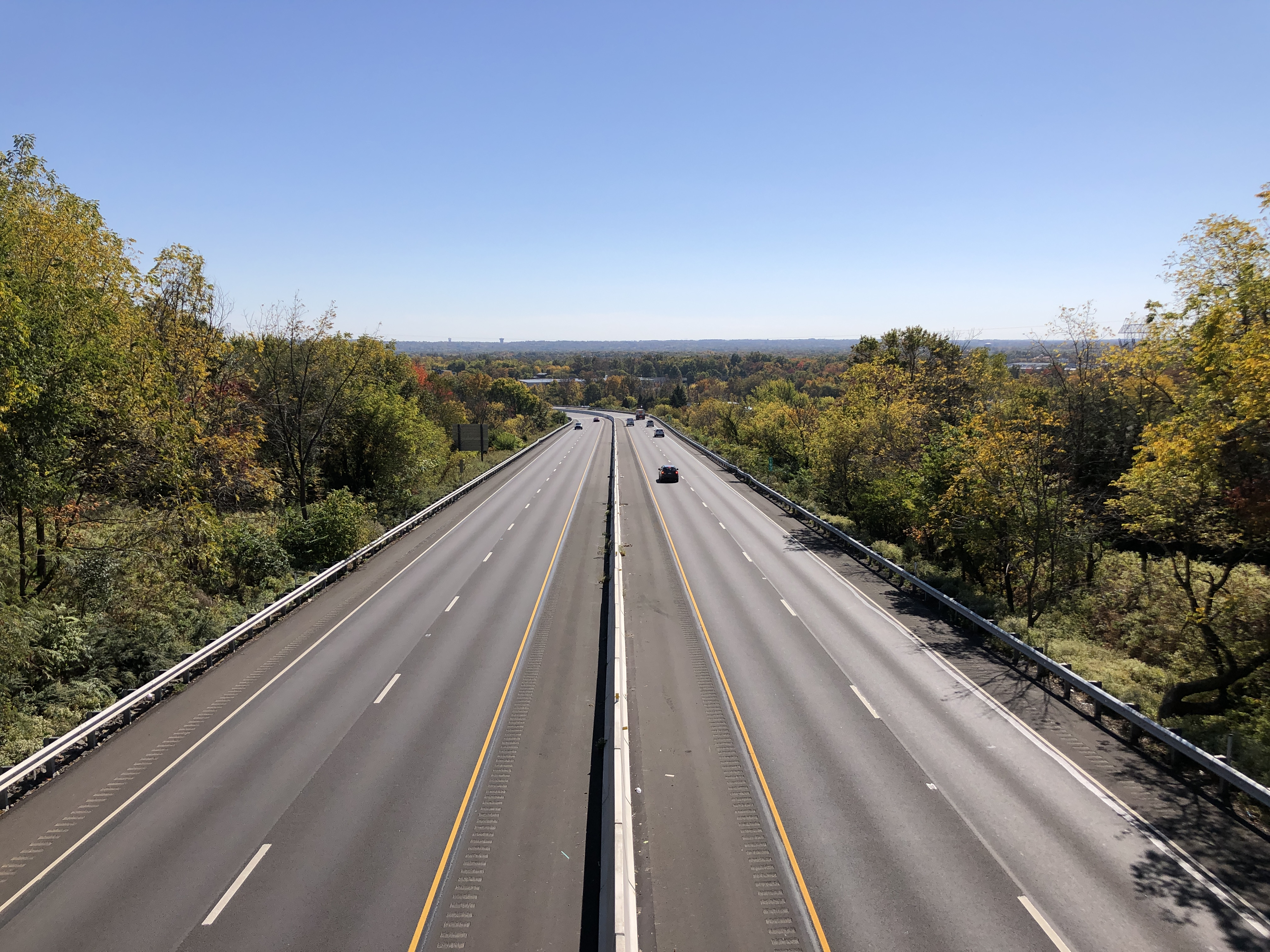
PA 309 southbound in Hilltown Township

As of 2022 there were 135.75 miles (218.47 km) of public roads in Hilltown Township, of which 45.31 miles (72.92 km) were maintained by the Pennsylvania Department of Transportation (PennDOT) and 90.44 miles (145.55 km) were maintained by the township.

Pennsylvania Route 309 is the most prominent highway serving Hilltown Township. It follows the Sellersville Bypass on a southeast-to-northwest alignment through the southwestern portion of the township. Pennsylvania Route 113 follows Souderton Road along a southwest-to-northeast alignment through northern and western sections of the township. Pennsylvania Route 152 follows a southeast-to-northwest alignment utilizing several roads across the central portion of the township. Finally, Pennsylvania Route 313 follows a southeast-to-northwest alignment mostly along Dublin Pike along the northeastern edge of the township.

The southwestern portion of Hilltown Township is served by SEPTA bus Route 132, which runs between the Montgomery Mall and Telford.

== Climate ==
According to the Köppen climate classification system, Hilltown Twp has a Hot-summer, Humid continental climate (Dfa). Dfa climates are characterized by at least one month having an average mean temperature ≤ 32.0 °F (0.0 °C), at least four months with an average mean temperature ≥ 50.0 °F (10.0 °C), at least one month with an average mean temperature ≥ 71.6 °F (22.0 °C) and no significant precipitation difference between seasons. Although most summer days are slightly humid in Hilltown Twp, episodes of heat and high humidity can occur with heat index values > 104 °F (40 °C). Since 1981, the highest air temperature was 101.3 °F (38.5 °C) on July 22, 2011, and the highest daily average mean dew point was 74.0 °F (23.3 °C) on August 12, 2016. The average wettest month is July which corresponds with the annual peak in thunderstorm activity. Since 1981, the wettest calendar day was 6.66 inches (169 mm) on August 27, 2011. During the winter months, the average annual extreme minimum air temperature is −3.1 °F (−19.5 °C). Since 1981, the coldest air temperature was −13.5 °F (−25.3 °C) on January 22, 1984. Episodes of extreme cold and wind can occur with wind chill values < −14 °F (−26 °C). The average annual snowfall (Nov-Apr) is between 30 inches (76 cm) and 36 inches (91 cm). Ice storms and large snowstorms depositing ≥ 12 inches (30 cm) of snow occur once every few years, particularly during nor’easters from December through February.

Climate data for Hilltown Twp, Elevation 561 ft (171 m), 1981-2010 normals, extremes 1981-2018
Month	Jan	Feb	Mar	Apr	May	Jun	Jul	Aug	Sep	Oct	Nov	Dec	Year
Record high °F (°C)	69.9 (21.1)	77.2 (25.1)	85.6 (29.8)	92.6 (33.7)	93.6 (34.2)	94.4 (34.7)	101.3 (38.5)	98.5 (36.9)	96.2 (35.7)	87.9 (31.1)	79.7 (26.5)	74.3 (23.5)	101.3 (38.5)
Mean daily maximum °F (°C)	37.7 (3.2)	41.1 (5.1)	49.4 (9.7)	61.8 (16.6)	71.6 (22.0)	80.1 (26.7)	84.1 (28.9)	82.5 (28.1)	75.7 (24.3)	64.3 (17.9)	53.3 (11.8)	41.9 (5.5)	62.1 (16.7)
Daily mean °F (°C)	28.9 (−1.7)	31.7 (−0.2)	39.3 (4.1)	50.3 (10.2)	60.0 (15.6)	69.0 (20.6)	73.5 (23.1)	71.9 (22.2)	64.5 (18.1)	53.2 (11.8)	43.4 (6.3)	33.4 (0.8)	51.7 (10.9)
Mean daily minimum °F (°C)	20.2 (−6.6)	22.3 (−5.4)	29.2 (−1.6)	38.8 (3.8)	48.5 (9.2)	57.9 (14.4)	62.8 (17.1)	61.3 (16.3)	53.4 (11.9)	42.0 (5.6)	33.5 (0.8)	24.9 (−3.9)	41.3 (5.2)
Record low °F (°C)	−13.5 (−25.3)	−5.9 (−21.1)	1.4 (−17.0)	15.6 (−9.1)	30.4 (−0.9)	39.5 (4.2)	46.0 (7.8)	40.7 (4.8)	33.6 (0.9)	22.5 (−5.3)	10.0 (−12.2)	−3.7 (−19.8)	−13.5 (−25.3)
Average precipitation inches (mm)	3.42 (87)	2.79 (71)	3.86 (98)	4.06 (103)	4.37 (111)	4.40 (112)	4.84 (123)	3.97 (101)	4.57 (116)	4.27 (108)	3.74 (95)	3.98 (101)	48.27 (1,226)
Average relative humidity (%)	68.4	65.1	60.8	59.0	63.5	69.7	69.5	72.0	73.4	71.4	70.4	70.4	67.8
Average dew point °F (°C)	19.8 (−6.8)	21.3 (−5.9)	26.9 (−2.8)	36.5 (2.5)	47.6 (8.7)	58.7 (14.8)	62.9 (17.2)	62.4 (16.9)	55.8 (13.2)	44.2 (6.8)	34.4 (1.3)	24.8 (−4.0)	41.4 (5.2)
Source: PRISM

== Education ==
Most of the township is in the Pennridge School District, while a small portion in the southeast corner is in North Penn School District.

== Ecology ==
According to the A. W. Kuchler U.S. potential natural vegetation types, Hilltown Twp would have a dominant vegetation type of Appalachian Oak (104) with a dominant vegetation form of Eastern Hardwood Forest (25). The plant hardiness zone is 6b with an average annual extreme minimum air temperature of −3.1 °F (−19.5 °C). The spring bloom typically begins by April 15 and fall color usually peaks by October 26.
