= Pipersville, Pennsylvania =

Unincorporated community in Pennsylvania, US

- Unincorporated community
- Location within Pennsylvania Location within the United States
- Coordinates: 40°25′31″N 75°8′22″W
- Country: United States
- State: Pennsylvania
- County: Bucks
- Township: Bedminster
- Elevation: 436 ft (133 m)

Population (2000)
  - Total: 6,336
- Time zone: UTC-5 (Eastern (EST))
  - Summer (DST): UTC-4 (EDT)
- ZIP Code: 18947
- Area codes: 215, 267, and 445
- GNIS feature ID: 1183962

Pipersville is an unincorporated community in Bedminster and Plumstead Townships in Bucks County, Pennsylvania, United States. Pipersville is located at the intersection of Pennsylvania State Routes 413 and 611.

Pipersville comprises several agricultural properties, most of which are subject to conservation easements that do not permit subdivisions or development.
