= Fountainville, Pennsylvania =

Unincorporated community in Pennsylvania, US

- Unincorporated community
- Location within Pennsylvania Location within the United States
- Coordinates: 40°20′28″N 75°9′2″W
- Country: United States
- State: Pennsylvania
- County: Bucks
- Township: Doylestown, New Britain, and Plumstead
- Elevation: 407 ft (124 m)
- Time zone: UTC-5 (Eastern (EST))
  - Summer (DST): UTC-4 (EDT)
- ZIP Code: 18923
- Area codes: 215, 267 and 445
- GNIS feature ID: 1203615

Fountainville is an unincorporated community in Bucks County, Pennsylvania, United States. Fountainville is located at the intersection of Pennsylvania Route 313 and Ferry Road at the tripoint of Doylestown, New Britain, and Plumstead townships.
