= Dublin, Pennsylvania =

Borough in Pennsylvania, US

- Borough
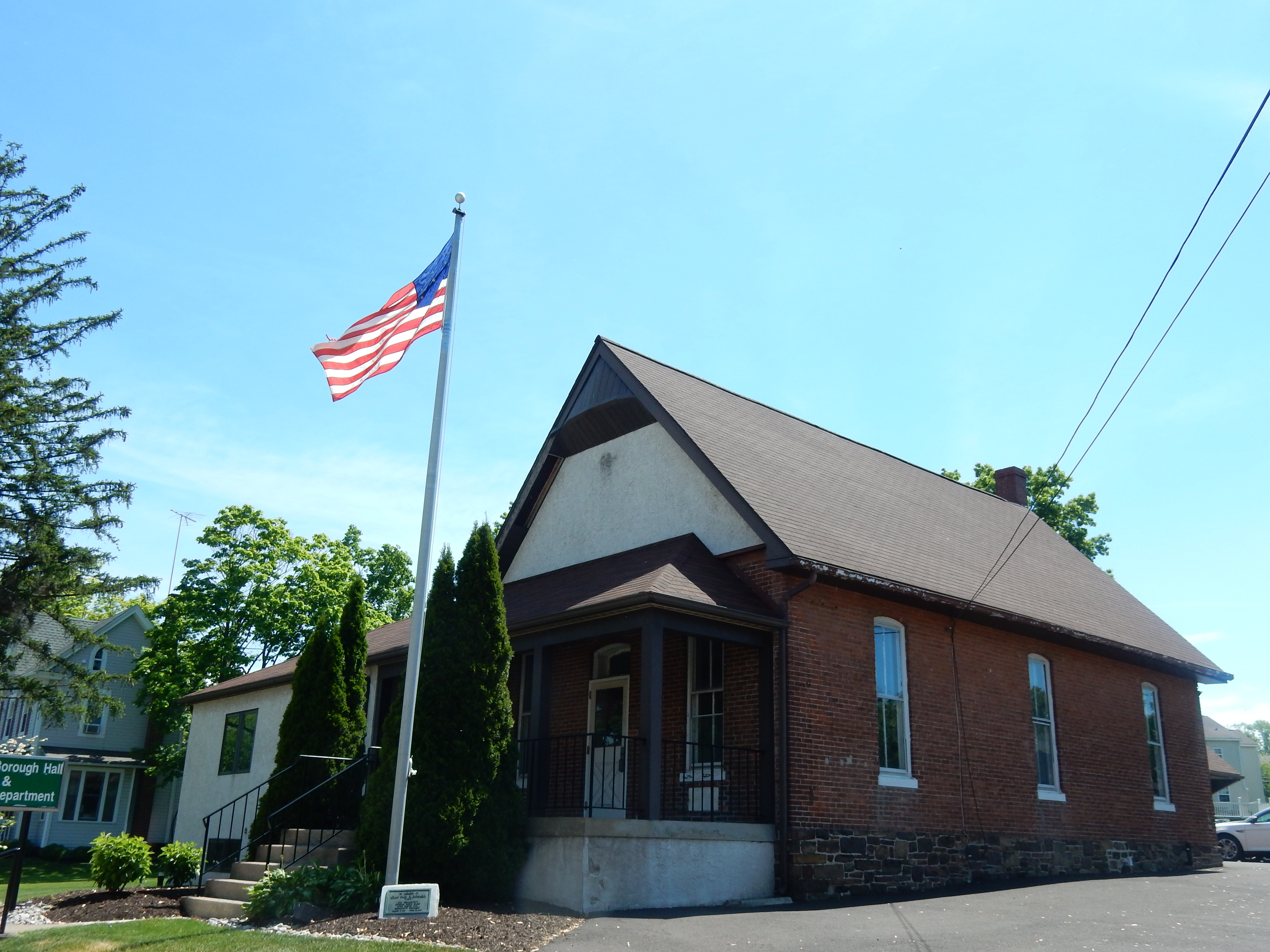
- Borough Hall

- Seal

- Location in Bucks County, Pennsylvania

- Location in Pennsylvania Location in the United States
- Coordinates: 40°22′24″N 75°12′09″W
- Country: United States
- State: Pennsylvania
- County: Bucks

Government
  - Body: Mayor, Council
  - Mayor: Chris Hayes (R)

Area
  - Total: 0.58 sq mi (1.51 km^{2})
  - Land: 0.58 sq mi (1.51 km^{2})
  - Water: 0 sq mi (0.00 km^{2})
- Elevation: 597 ft (182 m)

Population (2020)
  - Total: 2,177
  - Density: 3,735.0/sq mi (1,442.08/km^{2})
- Time zone: UTC-5 (Eastern (EST))
  - Summer (DST): UTC-4 (EDT)
- ZIP Code: 18917
- Area codes: 215, 267 and 445
- FIPS code: 42-20104
- Website: www.dublinborough.org

Dublin is a borough in Bucks County, Pennsylvania, United States. The population was 2,177 at the 2020 census. Dublin is part of Pennridge School District.

== Geography ==
Dublin is located at 40°22′24″N 75°12′9″W (40.373270, -75.202464). According to the U.S. Census Bureau, the borough has a total area of 0.5 square miles (1.3 km^{2}), all land.

== History ==
Prior to the arrival of Europeans the area was occupied by the Lenape people. Early settlers were predominately Irish followed by Germans. Local lore holds that the second tavern built on the site of the first tavern was a double log cabin with a chimney built between them, and that the name was derived from "Double Inn", but there is no documentation to support this. It is likely that the name was derived from the city in Ireland. A letter written by Reverend Uriah DuBois date Durham, April 21, 1798 is the first known mention of Dublin. In an agreement of sale for the tavern and 76 acres (31 ha) of land by Isaac Morris, of Hatfield, to Charles Brock, of Hilltown Township for $6400 dated December 12, 1817, Dublin was referred to as "the village of Dublin".

In 1832, locals attempted to erect Dublin into a township. The petition signed by _____ Angelmoyer, Samuel Angeny, Isaac Bechtel, Enos Cassel, Isaac Cassel, Joseph Detweiler, Christian Eckert, Philip Fluck, Abraham Fritz, Enos Hunsberger, Samuel Kile, Dielman Kolb, Henry Kolb, Jacob Kolb, Michael Kulp, Joseph Moyer, Samuel Moyer, Daniel Richert, John Wats and Samuel Wright was presented to Judge John Fox, failed. A second attempt in 1841 included some residents of New Britain Township also failed. Dublin was finally erected into a borough in 1912.

The first post office of Dublin was opened on April 18, 1827, Newton Rowland, postmaster. Prior to 1827, mail was delivered from Doylestown and Hilltown. William Rowland of Dublin served in the Pennsylvania General Assembly from 1812-1815. For many years, J. D. Moyer & Co. was one of the largest and most successful country stores in the county.

== Overview ==
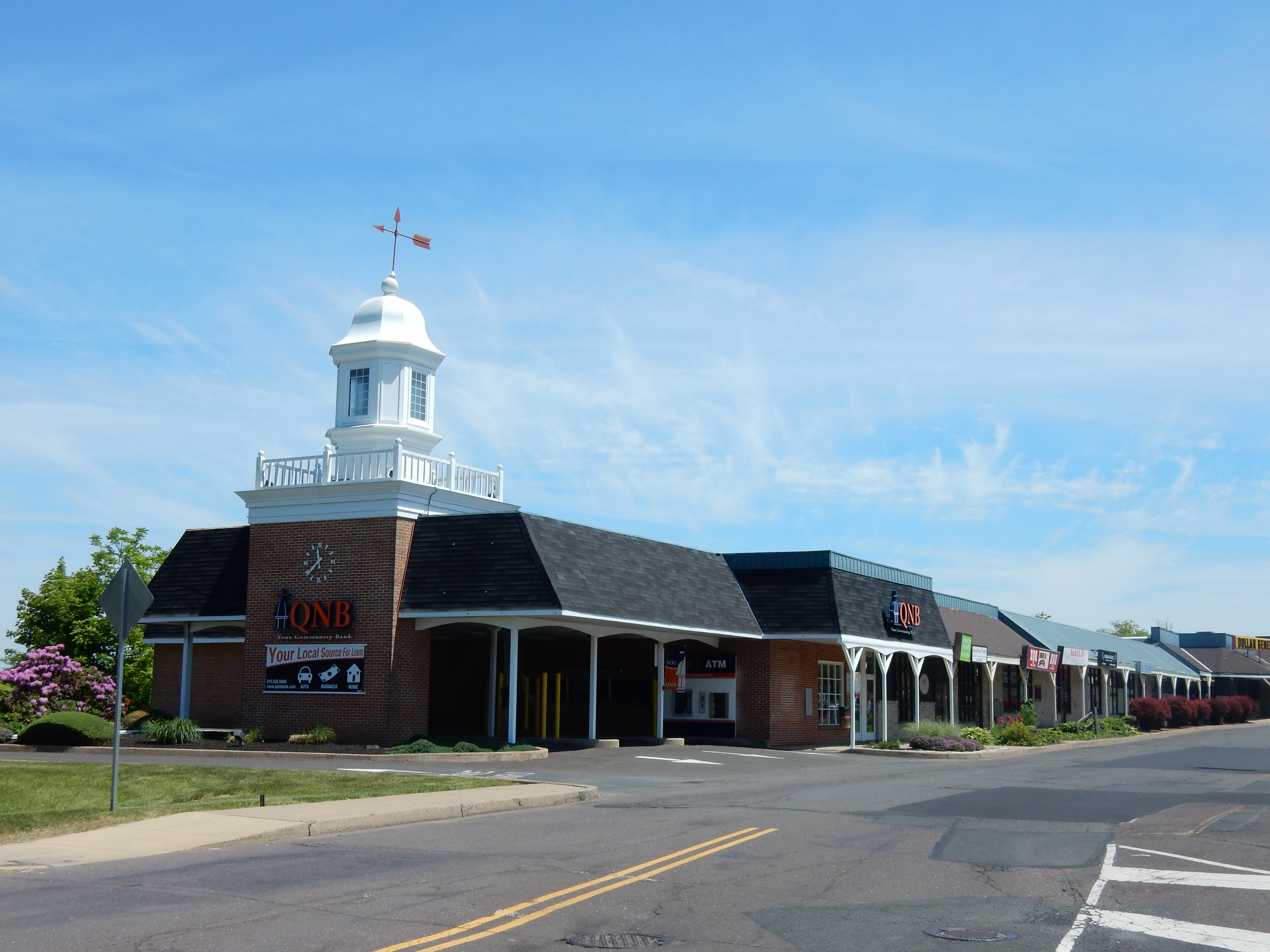
Dublin Village Shopping Center.

Dublin extends along a stretch of Pennsylvania Route 313 which connects the much larger towns of Doylestown and Quakertown. Almost the entire town can be viewed from PA 313 with only a few streets diverging from the main road. The town is surrounded by sparse housing developments and a series of dairy farms and nurseries, all of which are part of Hilltown Township and Bedminster Township. Dublin contains a small shopping center, a PennDOT Driver License Center, a pharmacy and 5 restaurants. Several rows of old houses line PA 313, some of which date back to the late 18th century. The majority of Dublin's population lives in several developments around the main part of town. Dublin has its own municipal government and maintains a fire station. Dublin has its own local police department and relies on Pennsylvania State Police when not on duty.

== Demographics ==
Historical population
Census	Pop.	Note	%±
1880	86		—
1920	223		—
1930	296		32.7%
1940	351		18.6%
1950	400		14.0%
1960	517		29.3%
1970	657		27.1%
1980	1,565		138.2%
1990	1,985		26.8%
2000	2,083		4.9%
2010	2,158		3.6%
2020	2,177		0.9%

As of the 2010 census, the borough was 90.5% White, 1.4% Black or African American, 0.1% Native American, 2.0% Asian, and 2.1% were two or more races. 8.9% of the population were of Hispanic or Latino ancestry.

As of the census of 2000, there were 2,083 people, 851 households, and 520 families residing in the borough. The population density was 3,825.7 inhabitants per square mile (1,477.1/km^{2}). There were 869 housing units at an average density of 1,596.0 per square mile (616.2/km^{2}). The racial makeup of the borough was 93.90% White, 1.59% African American, 0.19% Native American, 1.15% Asian, 0.14% Pacific Islander, 0.48% from other races, and 1.44% from two or more races. Hispanic or Latino of any race were 1.97% of the population.

There were 851 households, out of which 35.4% had children under the age of 18 living with them, 47.7% were married couples living together, 9.3% had a female householder with no husband present, and 38.8% were non-families. 29.1% of all households were made up of individuals, and 6.5% had someone living alone who was 65 years of age or older. The average household size was 2.45 and the average family size was 3.10.

In the borough, the population was spread out, with 26.4% under the age of 18, 10.3% from 18 to 24, 38.5% from 25 to 44, 16.5% from 45 to 64, and 8.3% who were 65 years of age or older. The median age was 32 years. For every 100 females there were 98.6 males. For every 100 females age 18 and over, there were 99.6 males.

The median income for a household in the borough was $48,235, and the median income for a family was $55,724. Males had a median income of $37,441 versus $26,589 for females. The per capita income for the borough was $21,778. About 4.3% of families and 6.2% of the population were below the poverty line, including 6.2% of those under age 18 and 7.0% of those age 65 or over.

== Transportation ==
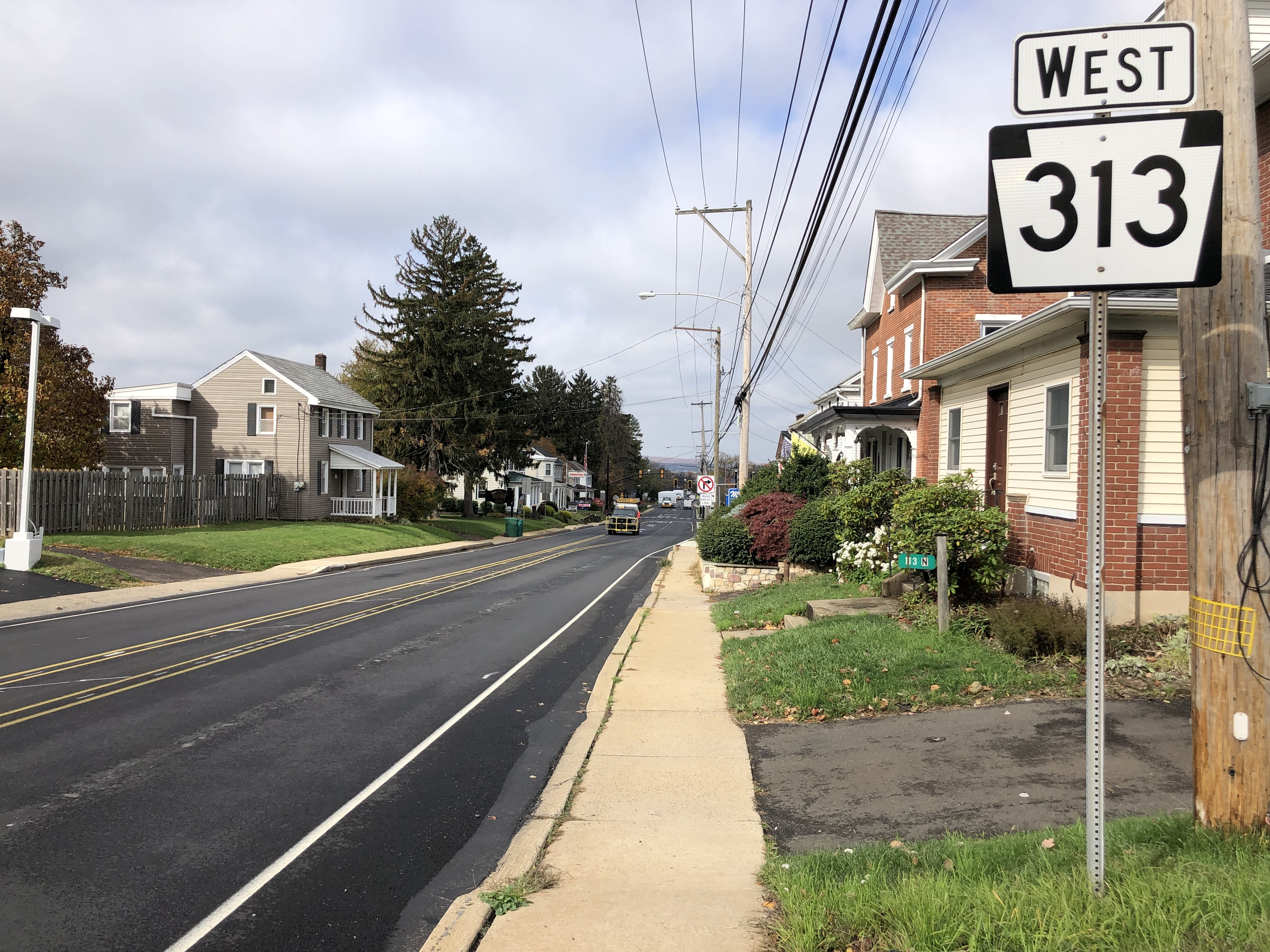
PA 313 westbound in Dublin

As of 2018 there were 6.26 miles (10.07 km) of public roads in Dublin, of which 2.29 miles (3.69 km) were maintained by the Pennsylvania Department of Transportation (PennDOT) and 3.97 miles (6.39 km) were maintained by the borough.

Pennsylvania Route 313 is the only numbered highway serving Dublin. It follows Main Street on a northwest-southeast alignment through the center of the borough.

== Climate ==
According to the Köppen climate classification system, Dublin has a Hot-summer, Humid continental climate (Dfa). Dfa climates are characterized by at least one month having an average mean temperature ≤ 32.0 °F (0.0 °C), at least four months with an average mean temperature ≥ 50.0 °F (10.0 °C), at least one month with an average mean temperature ≥ 71.6 °F (22.0 °C) and no significant precipitation difference between seasons. Although most summer days are slightly humid in Dublin, episodes of heat and high humidity can occur, with heat index values > 104 °F (40 °C). Since 1981, the highest air temperature was 101.7 °F (38.7 °C) on July 22, 2011, and the highest daily average mean dew point was 74.4 °F (23.6 °C) on August 2, 2016. The average wettest month is July, which corresponds with the annual peak in thunderstorm activity. Since 1981, the wettest calendar day was 6.61 inches (168 mm) on August 27, 2011. During the winter months, the average annual extreme minimum air temperature is −2.7 °F (−19.3 °C). Since 1981, the coldest air temperature was −13.5 °F (−25.3 °C) on January 22, 1984. Episodes of extreme cold and wind can occur, with wind chill values < −14 °F (−26 °C). The average annual snowfall (Nov-Apr) is between 30 inches (760 mm) and 36 inches (910 mm). Ice storms and large snowstorms depositing ≥ 12 inches (30 cm) of snow occur once every few years, particularly during nor’easters from December through February.

Climate data for Dublin, Elevation 554 ft (169 m), 1981-2010 normals, extremes 1981-2018
Month	Jan	Feb	Mar	Apr	May	Jun	Jul	Aug	Sep	Oct	Nov	Dec	Year
Record high °F (°C)	70.0 (21.1)	77.3 (25.2)	86.0 (30.0)	92.9 (33.8)	93.8 (34.3)	94.6 (34.8)	101.7 (38.7)	98.5 (36.9)	96.4 (35.8)	88.3 (31.3)	79.7 (26.5)	74.2 (23.4)	101.7 (38.7)
Mean daily maximum °F (°C)	37.7 (3.2)	41.1 (5.1)	49.4 (9.7)	61.8 (16.6)	71.6 (22.0)	80.1 (26.7)	84.2 (29.0)	82.6 (28.1)	75.7 (24.3)	64.3 (17.9)	53.3 (11.8)	41.9 (5.5)	62.1 (16.7)
Daily mean °F (°C)	29.0 (−1.7)	31.8 (−0.1)	39.4 (4.1)	50.4 (10.2)	60.1 (15.6)	69.1 (20.6)	73.5 (23.1)	72.0 (22.2)	64.6 (18.1)	53.2 (11.8)	43.5 (6.4)	33.5 (0.8)	51.8 (11.0)
Mean daily minimum °F (°C)	20.3 (−6.5)	22.4 (−5.3)	29.3 (−1.5)	38.9 (3.8)	48.6 (9.2)	58.0 (14.4)	62.8 (17.1)	61.4 (16.3)	53.5 (11.9)	42.2 (5.7)	33.6 (0.9)	25.0 (−3.9)	41.4 (5.2)
Record low °F (°C)	−13.5 (−25.3)	−5.6 (−20.9)	1.4 (−17.0)	15.9 (−8.9)	31.4 (−0.3)	39.8 (4.3)	46.2 (7.9)	40.8 (4.9)	33.8 (1.0)	22.8 (−5.1)	10.2 (−12.1)	−3.4 (−19.7)	−13.5 (−25.3)
Average precipitation inches (mm)	3.42 (87)	2.77 (70)	3.82 (97)	4.08 (104)	4.35 (110)	4.38 (111)	4.92 (125)	4.01 (102)	4.56 (116)	4.30 (109)	3.75 (95)	4.02 (102)	48.38 (1,229)
Average relative humidity (%)	68.1	64.8	60.3	59.0	63.6	69.5	69.2	71.8	73.1	71.7	70.4	70.1	67.7
Average dew point °F (°C)	19.8 (−6.8)	21.3 (−5.9)	26.8 (−2.9)	36.6 (2.6)	47.7 (8.7)	58.7 (14.8)	62.8 (17.1)	62.4 (16.9)	55.8 (13.2)	44.3 (6.8)	34.5 (1.4)	24.8 (−4.0)	41.4 (5.2)
Source: PRISM

== Ecology ==
According to the A. W. Kuchler U.S. potential natural vegetation types, Dublin would have a dominant vegetation type of Appalachian Oak (104) with a dominant vegetation form of Eastern Hardwood Forest (25). The plant hardiness zone is 6b with an average annual extreme minimum air temperature of −2.7 °F (−19.3 °C). The spring bloom typically begins by April 14 and fall color usually peaks by October 26.

== Gallery ==
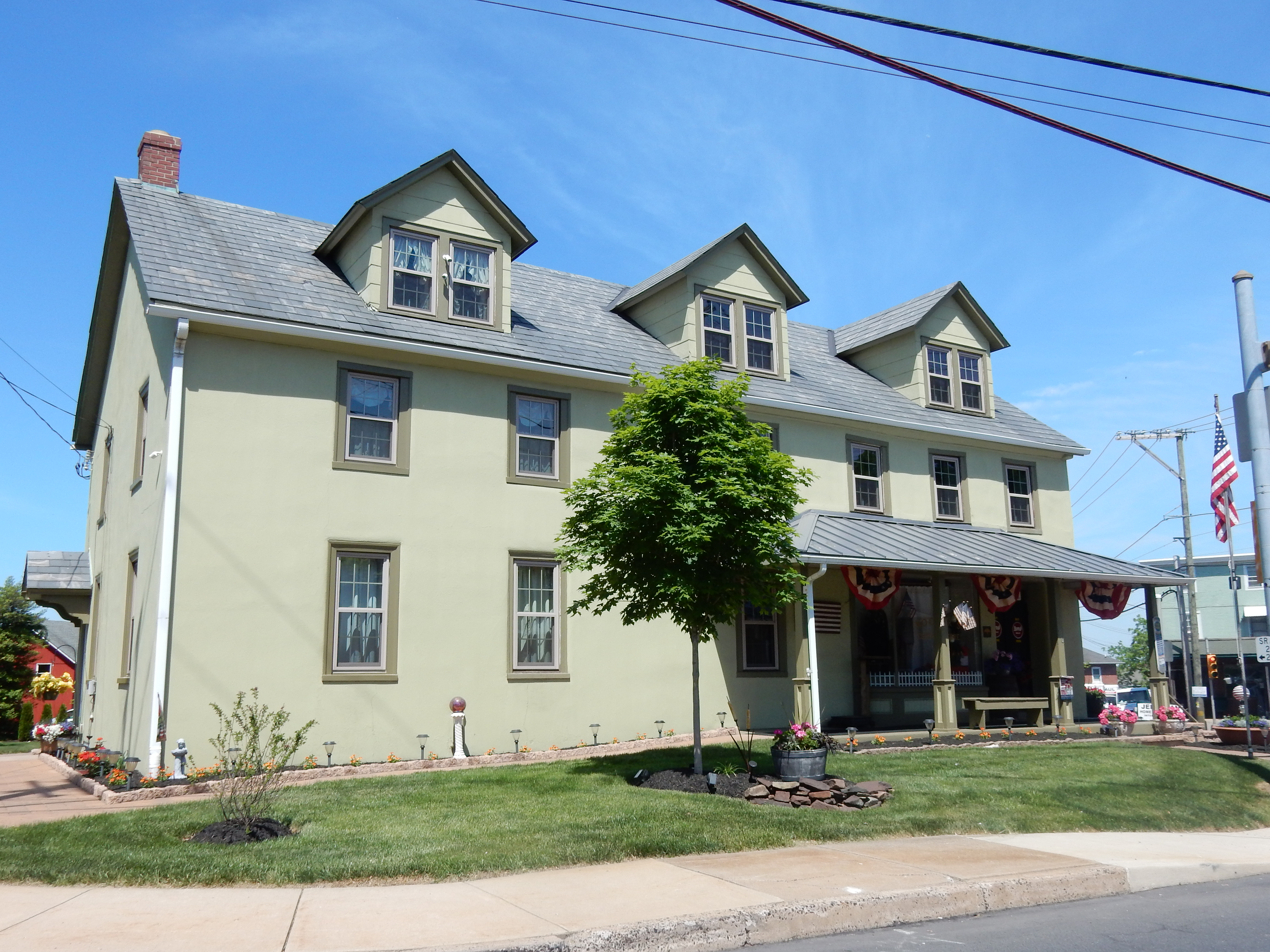
Historic Dublin Post Office.

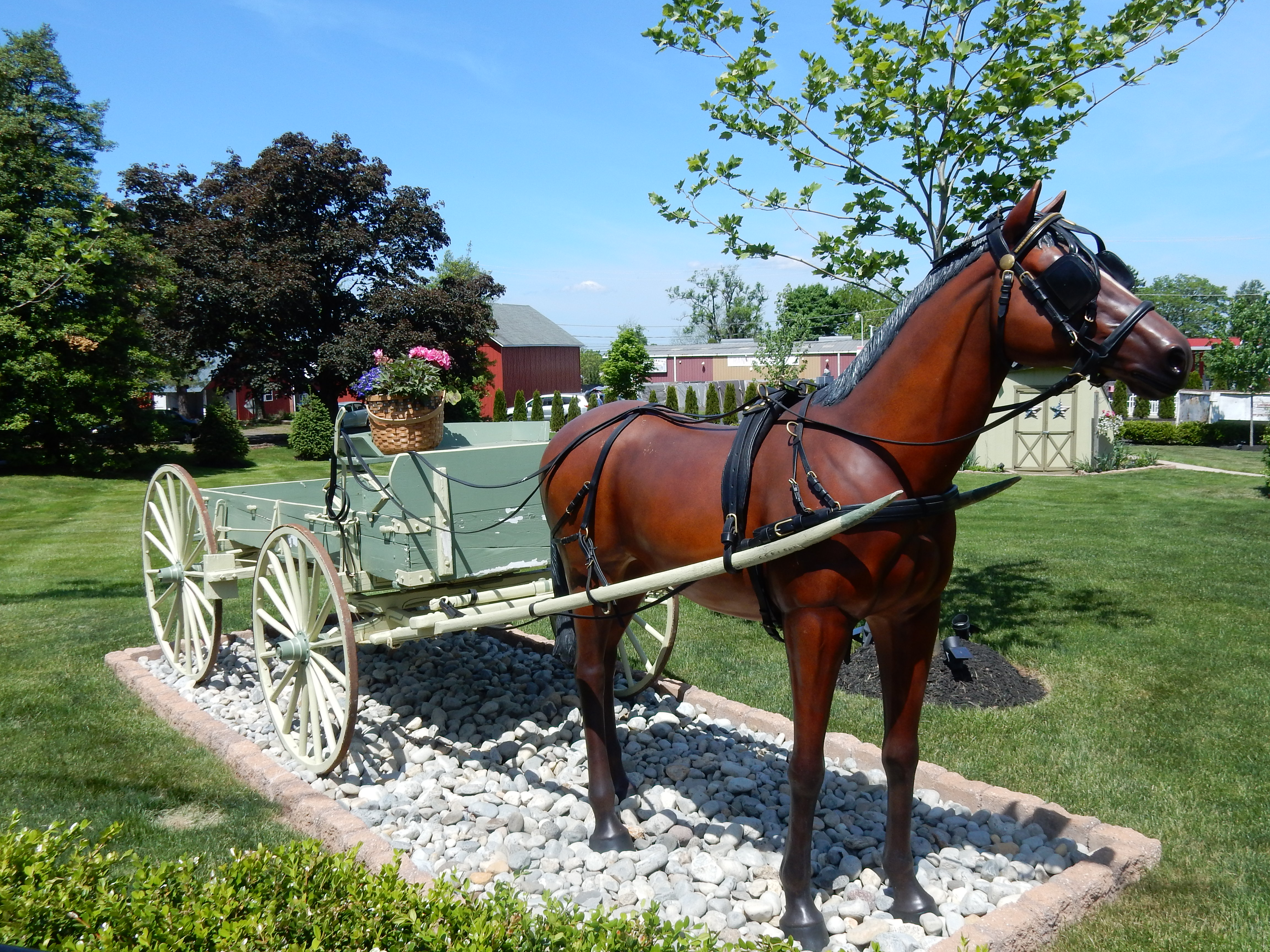
Wagon near Former Dublin Post Office.

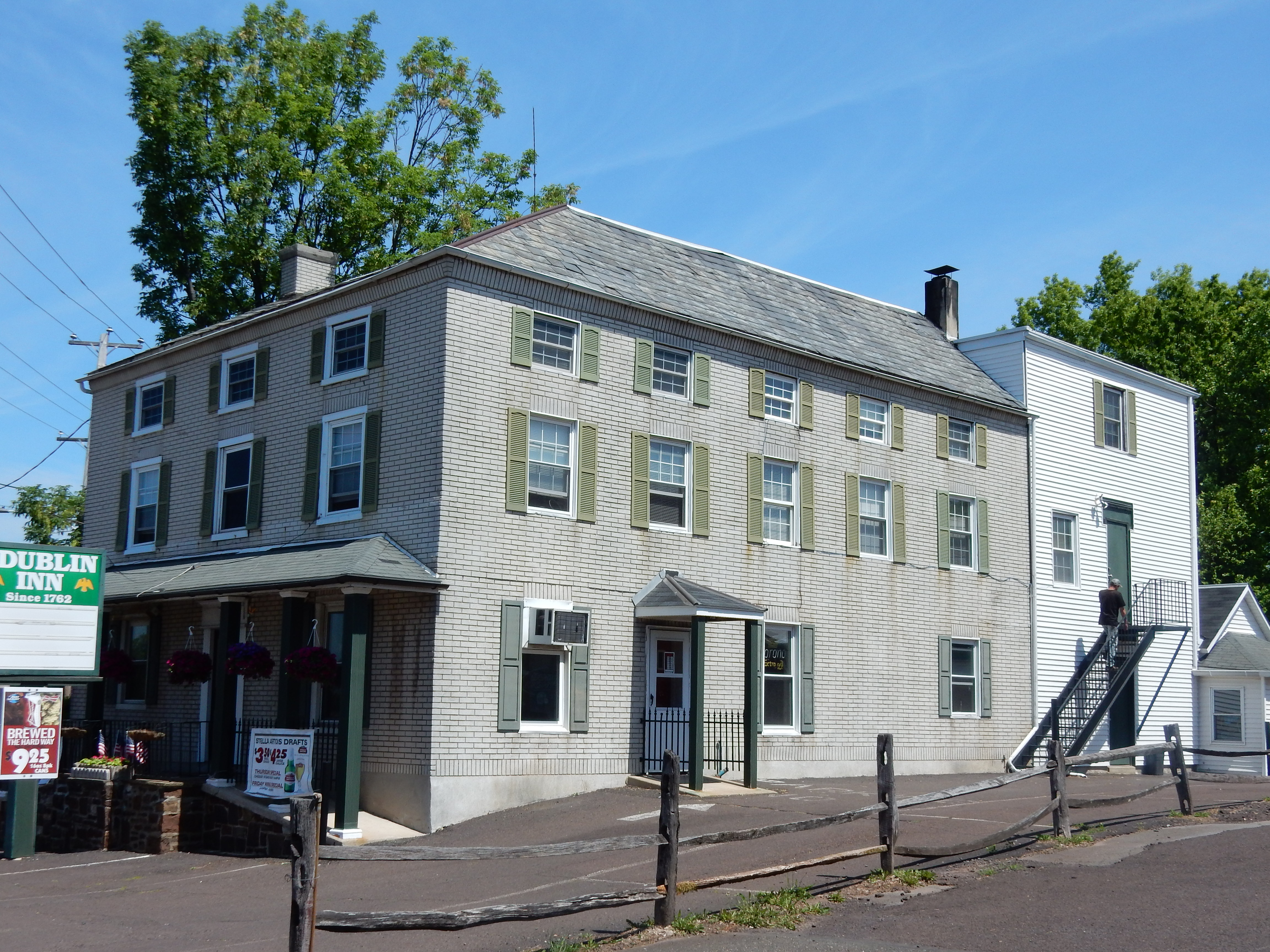
Dublin Inn.

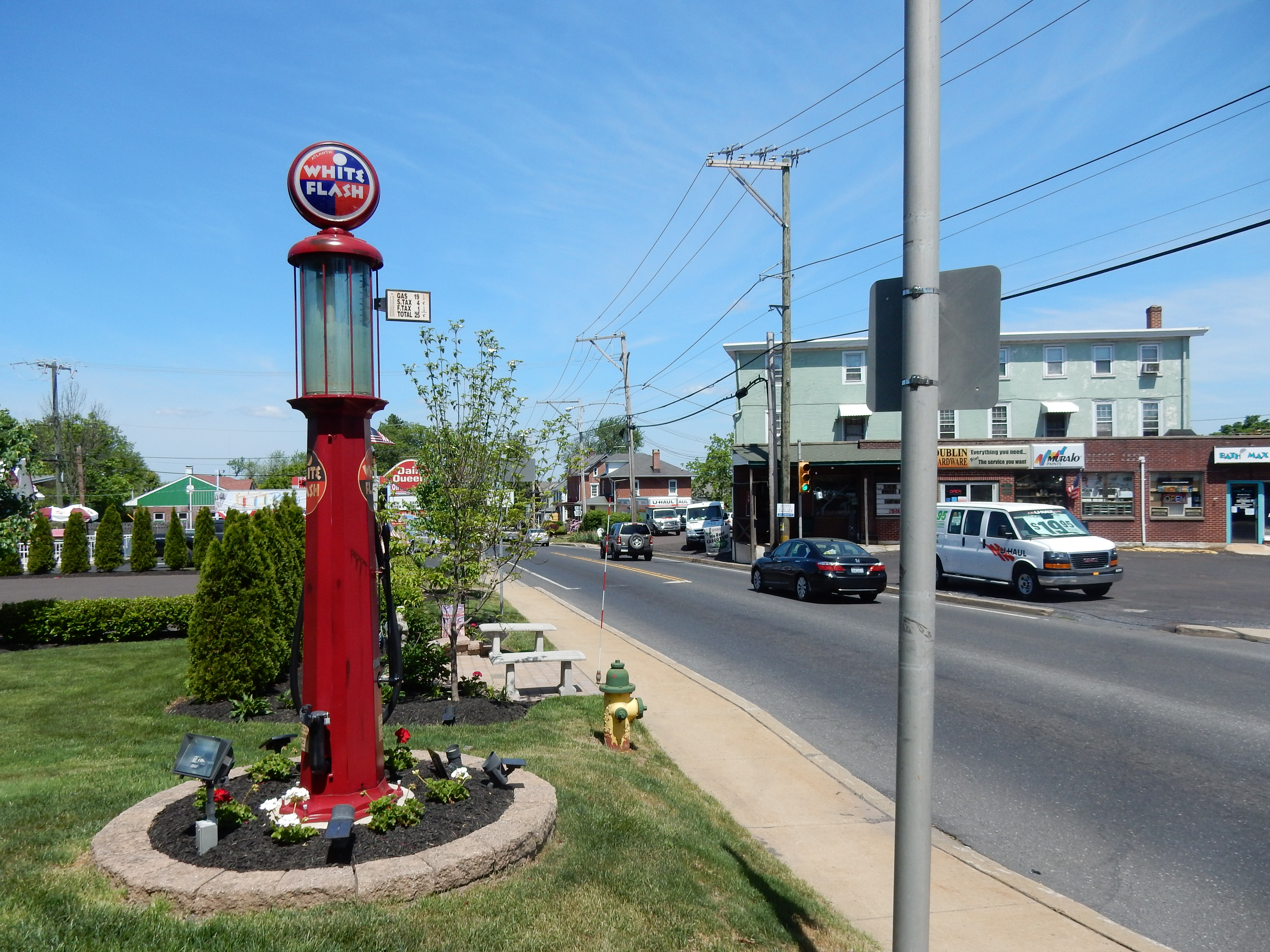
Historic Gas Pump on N. Main St.

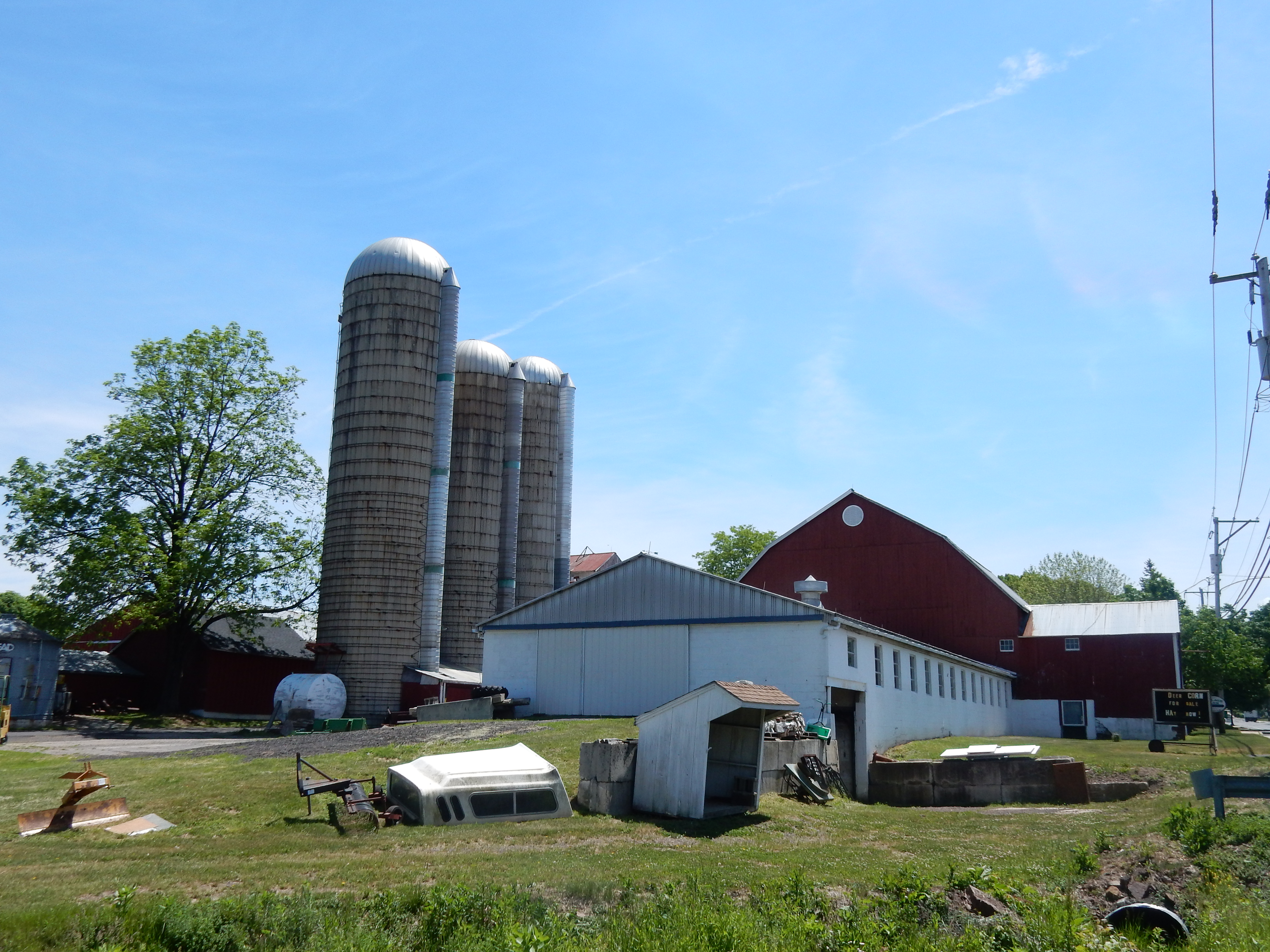
Moyer's Village Farm.
