= Wolf Run (Tohickon Creek tributary) =

- Wolf Run

Location
- Country: United States
- State: Pennsylvania
- County: Bucks
- Township: Bedminster

Physical characteristics
- Source
  - coordinates: 40°25′30″N 75°11′19″W
  - elevation: 380 feet (120 m)
- Mouth
  - coordinates: 40°26′33″N 75°9′41″W
  - elevation: 282 feet (86 m)
- Length: 1.73 miles (2.78 km)
- Basin size: 1.16 square miles (3.0 km^{2})

Basin features
- Progression: Wolf Run → Tohickon Creek → Delaware River → Delaware Bay
- River system: Delaware River
- Bridges: Creamery Road; Haas Court; Rolling Hills Road
- Slope: 56.65 feet per mile (10.729 m/km)

Deep Run is a tributary of the Tohickon Creek in Bedminster Township, Bucks County, Pennsylvania in the United States.

== Statistics ==
Wolf Run lies entirely within Bedminster Township. Its GNIS identification number is 1191669, its Pennsylvania Department of Environmental Resources identification number is 03141. Its length is 1.73 feet (0.53 m), its watershed is 1.16 square miles (3.0 km^{2}), rising at an elevation of 380 feet (120 m). It reaches its confluence at the Tohickon Creek's 7.90 river mile, at an elevation of 282 feet (86 m), only about 200 feet (61 m) downstream of where Mink Run and Deer Run reach the Tohickon. The average slope is 56.65 feet per mile (10.729 m/km)

== Course ==
Wolf Run rises in Bedminster Township north of Pennsylvania Route 113 (Bedminster Road) near the village of Bedminster and is northeast oriented in a relatively straight course to the Tohickon Creek.

== Geology ==
- Appalachian Highlands Division
  - Piedmont Province
    - Gettysburg-Newark Lowland Section
      - Brunswick Formation

Wolf Run lies within the Brunswick Formation in the Newark Basin laid down during the Jurassic and the Triassic. Rocks includes mudstone, siltstone, and reddish-brown, green, and brown shale. Mineralogy includes red and dark-gray argillite and hornfels.

== Crossings and Bridges ==
- Rolling Hills Road
- Haas Court
- Creamery Road

== See also ==
- List of rivers of the United States
- List of rivers of Pennsylvania
- List of Delaware River tributaries
