= Pennsylvania Route 313 =

State highway in Bucks County, Pennsylvania, US

Pennsylvania Route 313

Route information
- Maintained by PennDOT
- Length: 18.021 mi (29.002 km)
- Existed: 1928–present

Major junctions
- West end: PA 309 / PA 663 in Quakertown
- PA 212 in Quakertown; PA 563 in East Rockhill Township; PA 113 in Kulps Corner; PA 611 in Doylestown; US 202 in Doylestown
- East end: PA 263 in Furlong

Location
- Country: United States
- State: Pennsylvania
- Counties: Bucks

Highway system
- Pennsylvania State Route System; Interstate; US; State; Scenic; Legislative
← PA 312	→ PA 314

Pennsylvania Route 313 (PA 313) is a mostly 2-lane, 18-mile-long (29 km) state highway entirely within Bucks County, Pennsylvania. The western end of PA 313 is at an intersection with PA 309 and PA 663 in Quakertown. The eastern end is at an intersection with PA 263 in the Doylestown Township community of Furlong. PA 313 is signed an east–west road, although it runs almost purely northwest–southeast through most of its course. It is a major arterial road in central and northern Bucks County as it connects several communities including Quakertown, Dublin, and Doylestown.

The predecessors to present-day PA 313 were the Swamp Road, constructed in 1737, and the Dublin Pike, built in 1876. The route between Kulps Corner and Doylestown was originally designated as part of PA 113 by 1927, with a portion in Quakertown designated as PA 212 by the same time. PA 313 was designated by 1930 to run from PA 212 in Quakertown southeast to PA 113 and PA 413 in Kulps Corner. The roadway was finished during the 1930s. PA 313 was extended southeast to U.S. Route 611 (US 611) at Main Street in Doylestown in 1946, replacing a part of PA 113. PA 313 was realigned to end at US 202 east of Doylestown by 1950. In the 1970s, PA 313 was extended west to run concurrent with PA 212 to its current western terminus; the concurrent PA 212 designation was dropped by the 1990s. The route was extended to its current eastern terminus by 1980.

== Route description ==
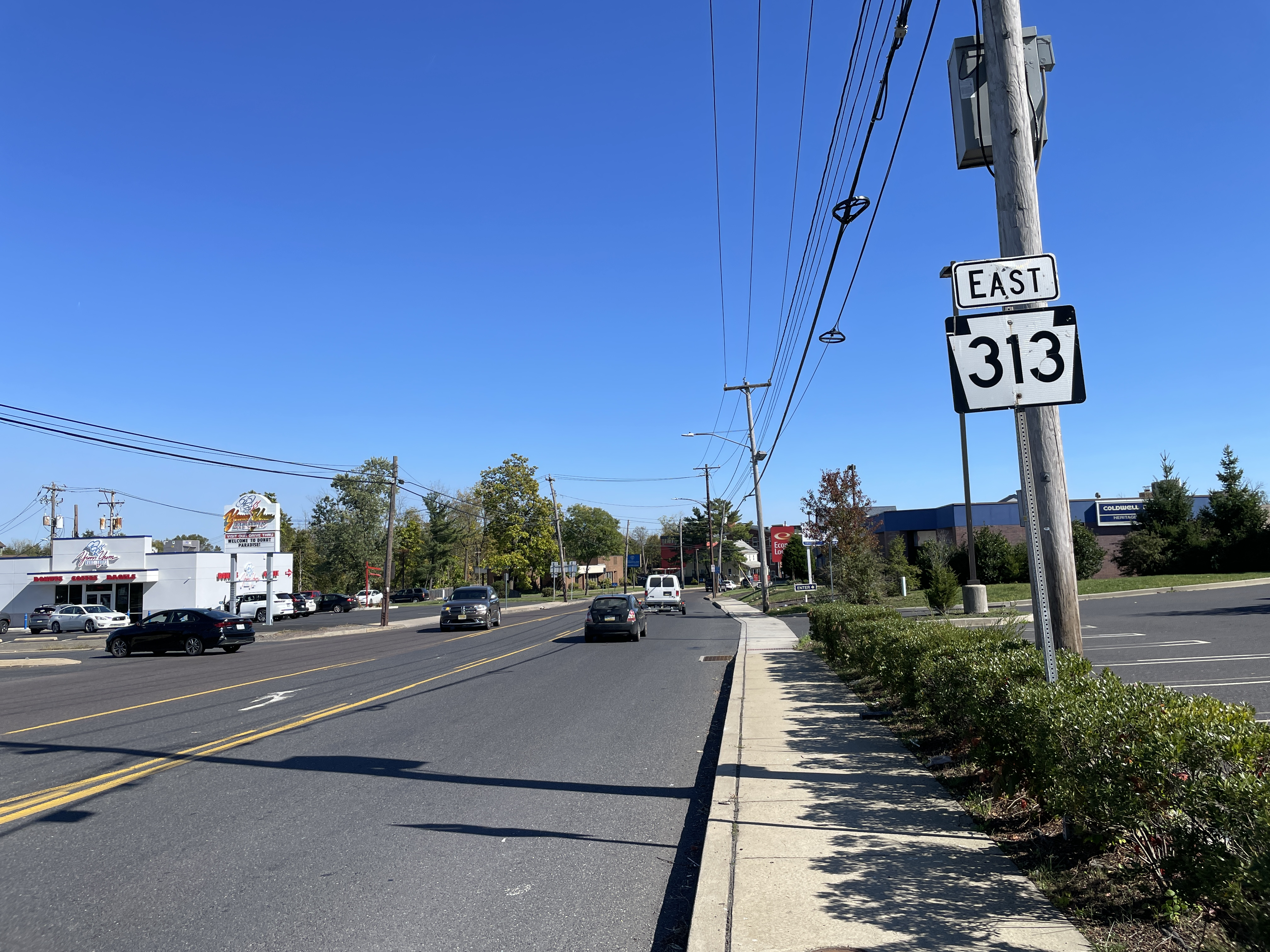
PA 313 eastbound past its western terminus at PA 309 and PA 663 in Quakertown

PA 313 begins at an intersection with PA 309 and the northern terminus of PA 663 in the borough of Quakertown in Bucks County. Past the western terminus, the roadway continues as PA 663. From this intersection, PA 313 heads east on two-lane divided West Broad Street, which soon gains a center left-turn lane briefly before becoming a two-lane undivided road. The road passes a mix of homes and businesses before continuing into residential areas past the Main Street intersection. The route enters the commercial downtown of Quakertown, where it splits into a one-way pair with two lanes in each direction. PA 313 turns into a two-way, two-lane undivided road again and has a grade crossing with the Bethlehem Line, a railroad line that is owned by SEPTA and operated by the East Penn Railroad, north of the former Quakertown station, becoming East Broad Street and coming to an intersection with the western terminus of PA 212. Following this intersection, the road passes homes, turning to the southeast and crossing Beaver Run. PA 313 continues near more residences with some businesses, making a curve to the east and leaving Quakertown for Richland Township. Here, the route becomes Doylestown Pike and heads southeast through areas of fields and woods with some homes, crossing Morgan Creek. The road heads into more forested areas and enters East Rockhill Township at the Rockhill Road intersection, where the name changes to Dublin Pike. PA 313 comes to an intersection with PA 563, which heads northeast to Nockamixon State Park, at which point PA 563 joins PA 313 in a concurrency. The road passes to the southwest of the state park and continues through a mix of farm fields and woods with occasional residences, crossing Threemile Run. PA 563 splits from PA 313 by heading southwest on Ridge Road.

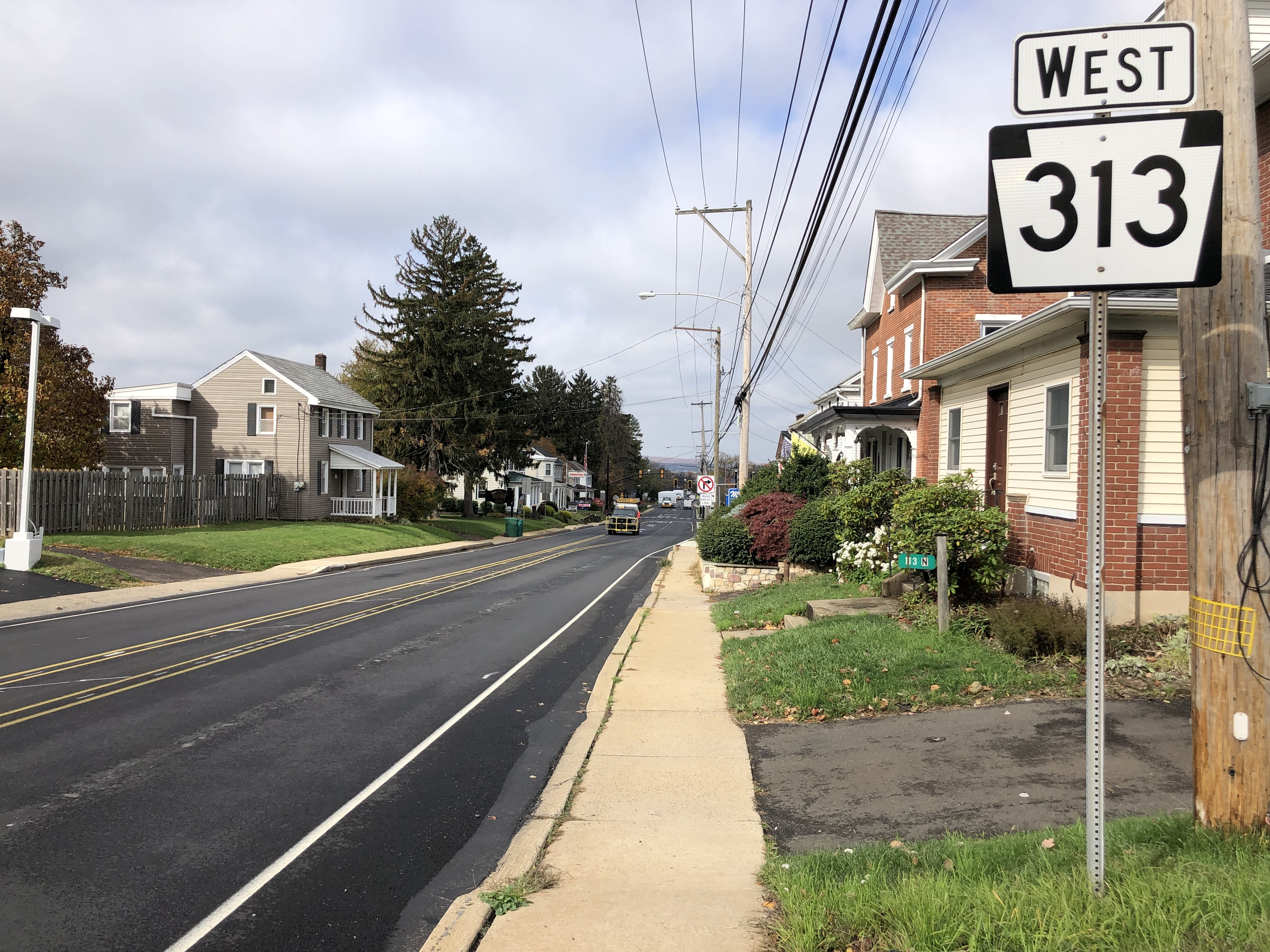
PA 313 westbound in Dublin

Past this intersection, PA 313 continues southeast, passing through more rural areas. At the Old Bethlehem Road intersection, the route becomes the border between Bedminster Township to the northeast and Hilltown Township to the southwest, crossing the East Branch Perkiomen Creek and running through agricultural areas with some woods and homes. The road comes to a junction with PA 113 in Kulps Corner, at which point there are a few businesses. PA 313 heads into the borough of Dublin at the Rickerts Road intersection and becomes North Main Street, where it passes homes and businesses and intersects Elephant Road/Maple Avenue. The route runs past more residences as South Main Street before it leaves Dublin and forms the border between Bedminster Township and Hilltown Township again, with the name changing back to Dublin Pike. The road heads into rural areas with some development and becomes Swamp Road as Old Dublin Pike loops to the north to intersect Applebutter Road. The route becomes the border between Plumstead Township to the northeast and Hilltown Township to the southwest before it intersects Old Dublin Pike again. At the intersection with Stump Road/Upper Stump Road, PA 313 becomes the line between Plumstead Township to the northeast and New Britain Township to the southwest, continuing through farmland with some woods and homes. The route passes to the northeast of Peace Valley Park, with access to the park provided by New Galena Road, and crosses the North Branch Neshaminy Creek before it comes to an intersection with Ferry Road in the community of Fountainville; Ferry Road also provides access to Peace Valley Park.

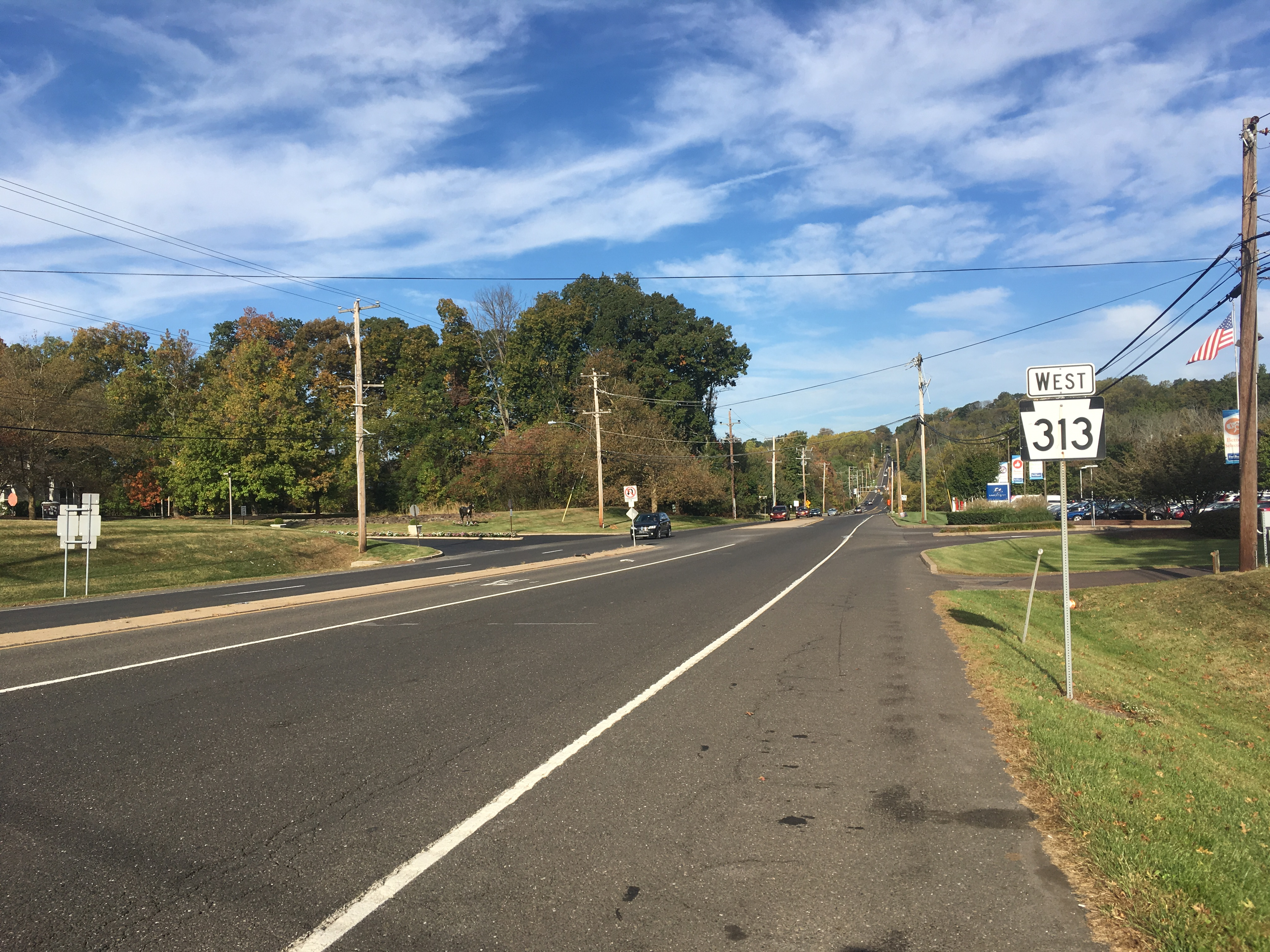
PA 313 westbound past PA 611 in Doylestown

At this point, the road becomes the border between Plumstead Township to the northeast and Doylestown Township to the southwest, running past residential subdivisions and crossing Pine Run. PA 313 heads into commercial areas and widens into a four-lane divided highway as it comes to a partial interchange with the PA 611 freeway bypass of the borough of Doylestown, with access to southbound PA 611 and from northbound PA 611. The route passes more businesses as a five-lane road with a center left-turn lane, becoming the border between Buckingham Township to the northeast and Doylestown Township to the southwest before crossing North Easton Road/North Main Street, with North Easton Road providing access to northbound PA 611 and from southbound PA 611. Past the Old Easton Road intersection a short distance later, the road narrows to two lanes and runs along the line between Buckingham Township to the northeast and Doylestown to the southwest, passing homes and businesses before running between farm fields to the northeast and Fonthill County Park to the southwest, which contains the Fonthill Museum and the Moravian Pottery and Tile Works. PA 313 fully enters Doylestown at the Court Street intersection and passes through residential areas. The route becomes the border between Buckingham Township and Doylestown again as it runs near more homes and reaches an intersection with US 202. Following this intersection, PA 313 forms the border between Buckingham Township to the northeast and Doylestown Township to the southwest, passing through a mix of woods and residential subdivisions before it reaches its eastern terminus at an intersection with PA 263 (York Road) in the community of Furlong. Past this intersection, Swamp Road continues southeast along unsigned quadrant routes toward the borough of Newtown.

== History ==
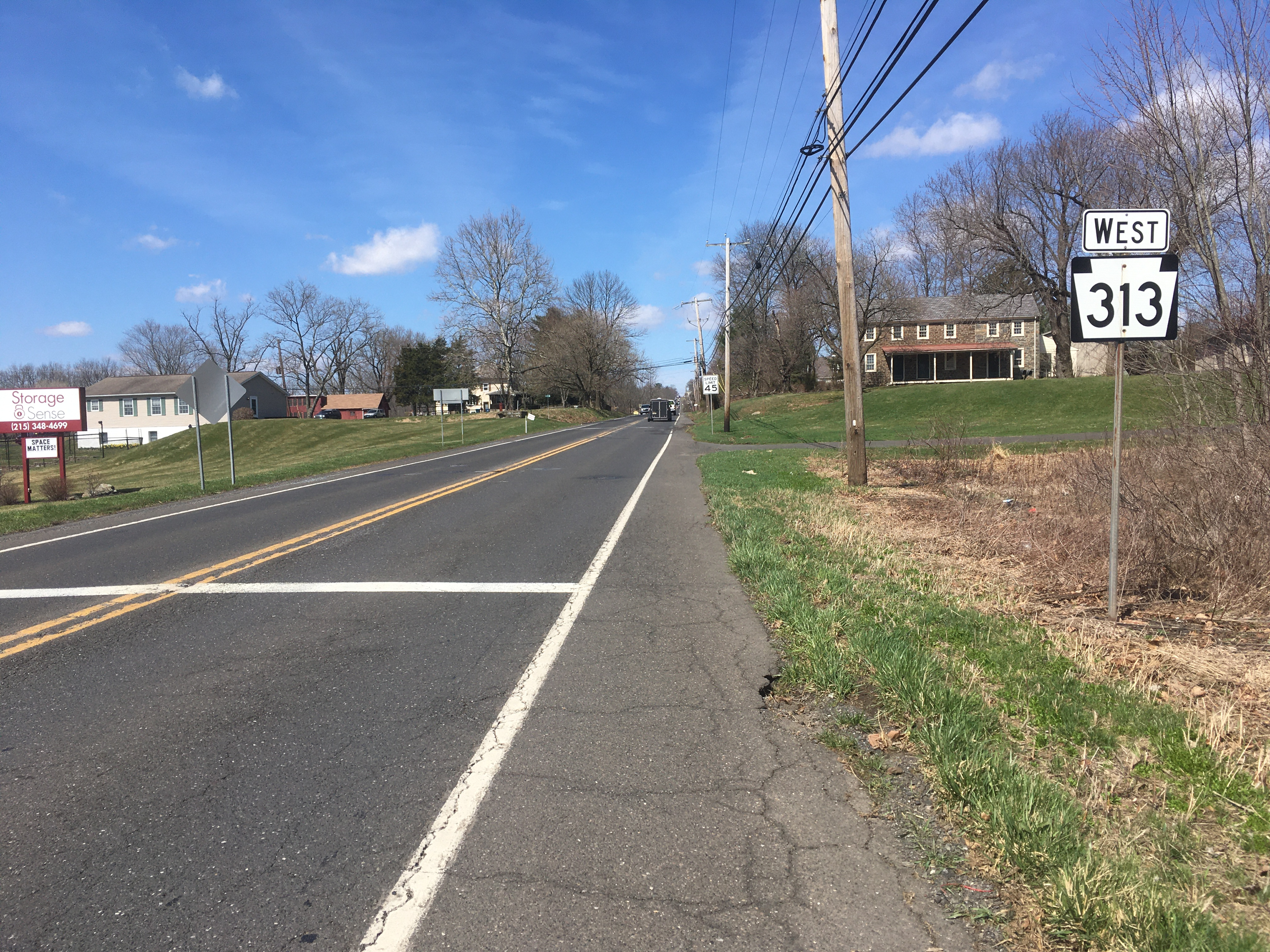
PA 313 westbound near Fountainville

Swamp Road dates back to 1737, when the Newtown Road was constructed and connected Newtown with Quakertown and Milford Township. The Dublin Pike was constructed in 1876. When Pennsylvania first legislated routes in 1911, what is now PA 313 from northwest of Dublin to Doylestown was legislated as part of Legislative Route 154. By 1927, PA 212 was designated on the westernmost part of current PA 313 between US 309 (now PA 309) and Hellertown Avenue in Quakertown and PA 113 was designated along the part of present-day PA 313 between Kulps Corner and Doylestown. PA 113 split from Swamp Road and followed present-day Old Dublin Pike to US 611 (Main Street) in Doylestown, where it turned south for a concurrency. PA 313 was designated by 1930 to run from PA 212 at Hellertown Avenue in Quakertown southeast to PA 113 and PA 413 in Kulps Corner. At this time, the route southeast of Quakertown was under construction. The portion of PA 313 between Quakertown and Kulps Corner was completed during the 1930s. PA 313 was extended southeast to US 611 (Main Street) and Old Dublin Pike in Doylestown in 1946, replacing the portion of PA 113 between Kulps Corner and Doylestown. By 1950, PA 313 was realigned to follow Swamp Road southeast to end at US 202 east of Doylestown, leaving the section of Old Dublin Pike heading into Doylestown unnumbered. PA 313 was extended west to run concurrent with PA 212 through Quakertown to end at its current western terminus with PA 309 and PA 663 by 1971. By 1980, PA 313 was extended southeast to end at its present location at PA 263. By 1991, the concurrency with PA 212 through Quakertown was removed.

== Major intersections ==
The entire route is in Bucks County.

Location	mi	km	Destinations	Notes
Quakertown	0.000	0.000	PA 309 (West End Boulevard) / PA 663 south (West Broad Street) – Sellersville, Allentown, Pennsburg	Western terminus; northern terminus of PA 663
Quakertown	1.366	2.198	PA 212 east (Hellertown Avenue)	Western terminus of PA 212
East Rockhill Township	4.784	7.699	PA 563 north (Mountain View Drive) – Nockamixon State Park	Western end of PA 563 concurrency
East Rockhill Township	6.037	9.716	PA 563 south (Ridge Road) – Perkasie	Eastern end of PA 563 concurrency
Hilltown–Bedminster township line	8.830	14.211	PA 113 (Bedminster Road / Souderton Road)	
Doylestown–Plumstead township line	14.486	23.313	PA 611 south (Doylestown Bypass) – Warrington	Interchange
Doylestown–Doylestown Township– Buckingham Township tripoint	16.501	26.556	US 202 (Buckingham Pike) – Buckingham, Doylestown	
Doylestown–Buckingham township line	18.021	29.002	PA 263 (York Road) – Buckingham, Hatboro	Eastern terminus
1.000 mi = 1.609 km; 1.000 km = 0.621 mi: Concurrency terminus

== Special routes ==
=== PA 313 Truck ===
Pennsylvania Route 313 Truck
- Location: Quakertown, Pennsylvania
- Length: 0.5 mi (800 m)

Pennsylvania Route 313 Truck signs are posted to direct trucks from westbound PA 212 to PA 313 in the borough of Quakertown, avoiding the intersection between PA 212 and PA 313. From PA 212, the route runs west on Mill Street and south on 4th Street to PA 313.

=== PA 313 Alternate Truck ===
PA Route 313 Alternate Truck
- Location: Bucks County, Pennsylvania
- Existed: 2013–2015

Pennsylvania Route 313 Alternate Truck was a truck route around a weight-restricted bridge over Beaver Run in Quakertown, on which trucks over 36 tons and combination loads over 40 tons were prohibited. The route followed PA 309, Lawn Avenue, and PA 563. It was signed in 2013, but the bridge was repaired in 2015, resulting in the deletion of the route.

== See also ==
- Pennsylvania Route 113
- Pennsylvania Route 213
- Pennsylvania Route 413
- Pennsylvania Route 513
