= Bedminster Township, Pennsylvania =

Township in Pennsylvania, US

- Township
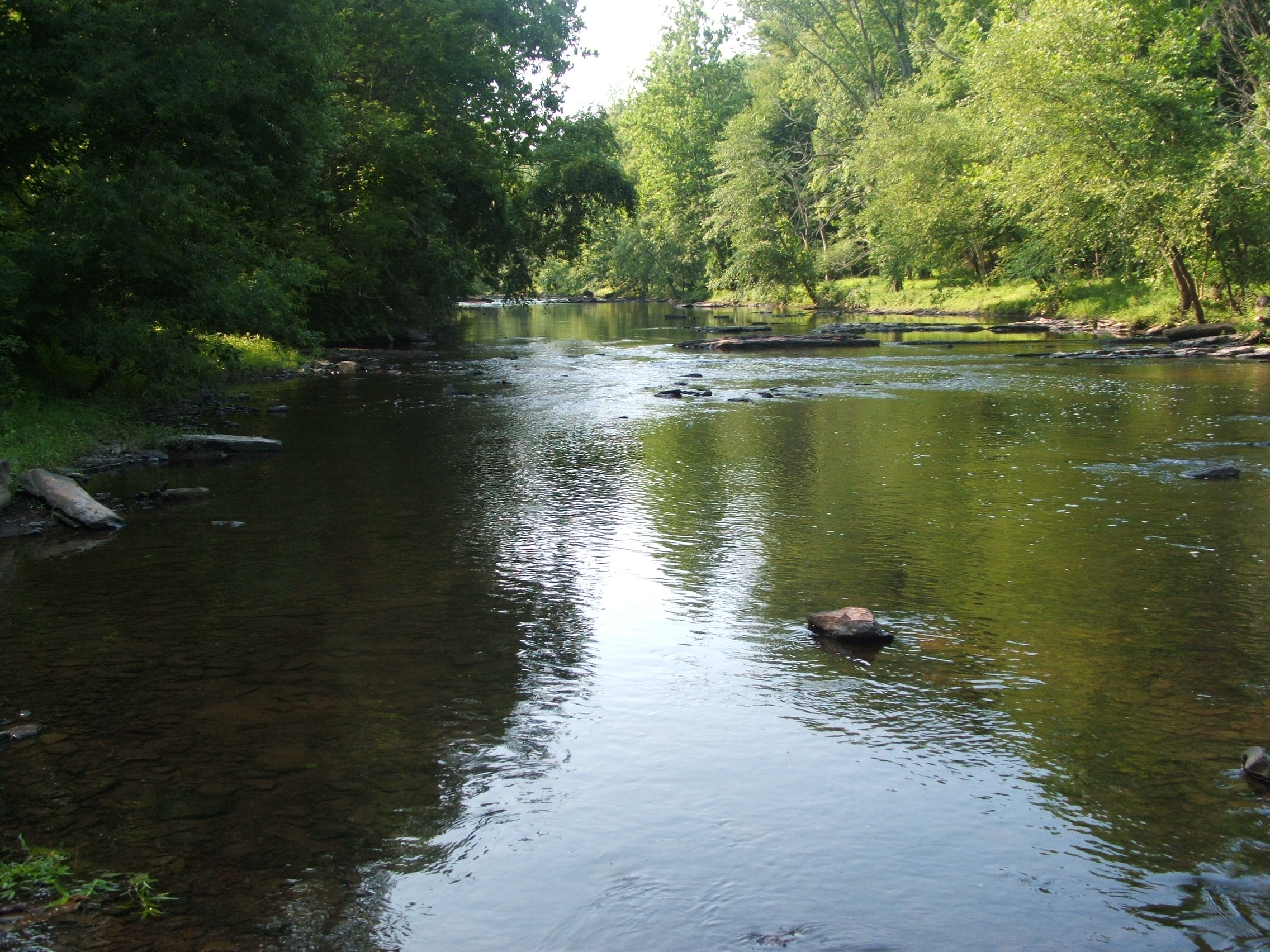
- Tohickon Creek

- Seal

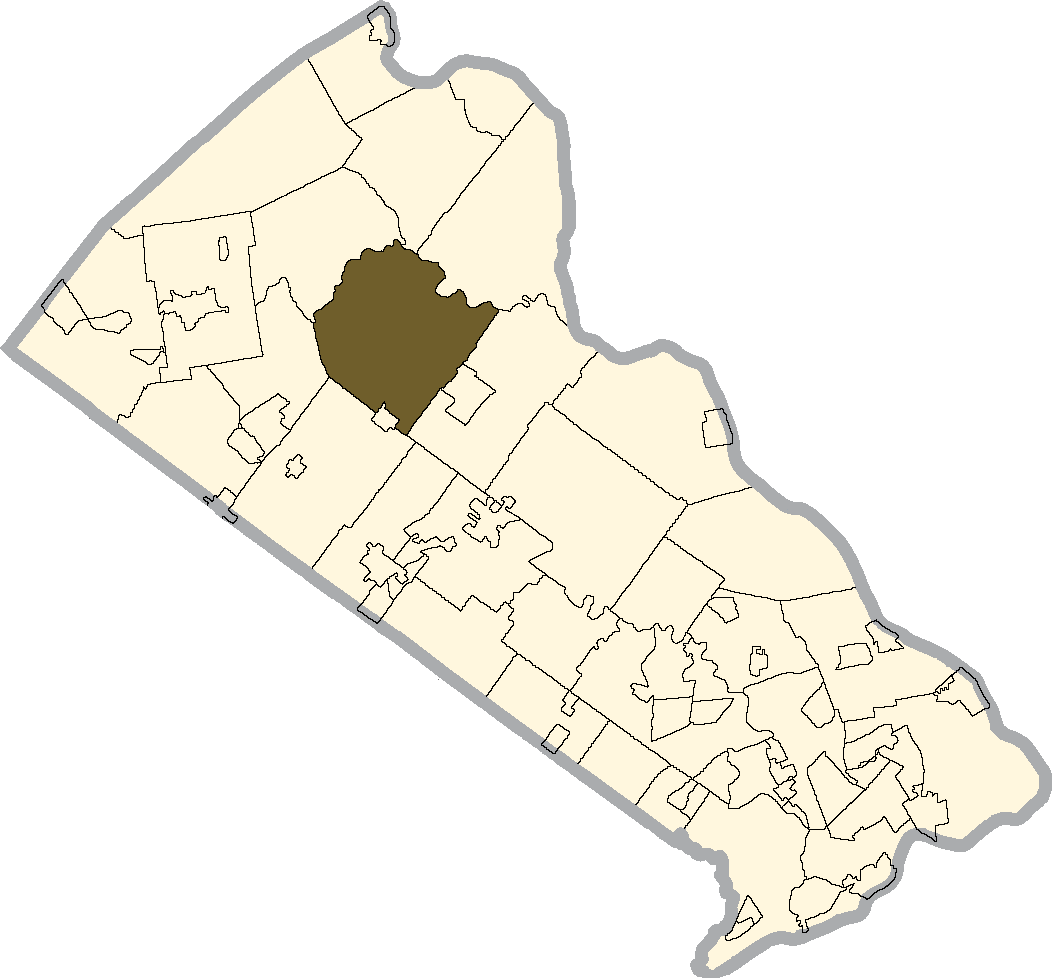
- Location of Bedminster Township in Bucks County

- Location in Pennsylvania and the United States Bedminster Township (the United States)
- Coordinates: 40°25′10″N 75°11′9″W
- Country: United States
- State: Pennsylvania
- County: Bucks

Area
  - Total: 31.24 sq mi (80.9 km^{2})
  - Land: 30.46 sq mi (78.9 km^{2})
  - Water: 0.78 sq mi (2.0 km^{2})
- Elevation: 341 ft (104 m)

Population (2020)
  - Total: 7,541
  - Density: 247.6/sq mi (95.59/km^{2})
- Time zone: UTC-5 (EST)
  - Summer (DST): UTC-4 (EDT)
- Area codes: 215, 267 and 445
- FIPS code: 42-017-04976
- Website: http://bedminsterpa.com/

Bedminster Township is a township in Bucks County, Pennsylvania, United States. The population was 7,541 at the 2020 census. It is part of the Philadelphia metropolitan area. Bedminster is part of Pennridge School District.

== History ==
Deep Run Presbyterian Church was established before 1725, Reverend William Tennant served as pastor from 1726 to 1738. In 1741, thirty-five residents, mostly Irish and German, petitioned the Court of Quarter Sessions to lay out the township which was granted and the land was surveyed by John Chapman. The name was taken from the town of the same name in Somersetshire, near Bristol, England. In 1841, the original church building was replaced, the new building was commonly called the 'Irish Meeting House', which still stands today. By 1746, enough Mennonites moved into the township to build a log church in the southeastern part of the township. The Tohickon Reformed Church was organized probably in June 1745, the first pastor was Reverend John Conrad Wirtz, of Zürich, Switzerland. Keller's Church was founded by Lutherans in 1744.

The Stover-Myers Mill was listed on the National Register of Historic Places in 1978.

== Geography ==
According to the United States Census Bureau, the township has a total area of 31.2 square miles (81 km^{2}), of which 30.5 square miles (79 km^{2}) is land and 0.8 square miles (2.1 km^{2}) (2.49%) is water. It is drained by the Tohickon Creek, which forms its northern boundary and drains eastward into the Delaware River. Lake Nockamixon forms much of the NW boundary.

=== Place names ===
Its villages include Bedminster, Bedminster Center, Deep Run, Elephant, Fretz, Griers Corner (also in Hilltown and Plumstead Townships), Hagersville, Jacobsville, Keelersville, Kellers Church, Kulps Corner (also in Hilltown Township), Owlsburg, Pipersville, and Weisel.

=== Natural features ===
Water features include Cabin Run, Deep Run, Deer Run, Haycock Creek, Mink Run, Northeast Branch of the Perkiomen Creek, Tohickon Creek, and Wolf Run.

=== Neighboring municipalities ===
- Tinicum Township (northeast)
- Plumstead Township (southeast)
- Hilltown Township (southwest)
- Dublin (southwest)
- East Rockhill Township (west)
- Haycock Township (northwest)
- Nockamixon Township (north)

== Demographics ==
Historical population
Census	Pop.	Note	%±
1930	2,087		—
1940	2,088		0.0%
1950	2,268		8.6%
1960	2,740		20.8%
1970	3,252		18.7%
1980	3,611		11.0%
1990	4,602		27.4%
2000	4,804		4.4%
2010	6,574		36.8%
2020	7,541		14.7%

As of the 2010 census, the township was 93.6% White, 0.8% Black or African American, 0.2% Native American, 1.9% Asian, and 1.7% were two or more races. 2.5% of the population were of Hispanic or Latino ancestry.

As of the census of 2000, there were 4,804 people, 1,788 households, and 1,333 families residing in the township. The population density was 159.3 inhabitants per square mile (61.5/km^{2}). There were 1,868 housing units at an average density of 61.9 per square mile (23.9/km^{2}). The racial makeup of the township was 98.13% White, 0.58% African American, 0.02% Native American, 0.42% Asian, 0.02% Pacific Islander, 0.19% from other races, and 0.65% from two or more races. Hispanic or Latino of any race were 0.92% of the population.

There were 1,788 households, out of which 32.0% had children under the age of 18 living with them, 65.6% were married couples living together, 6.1% had a female householder with no husband present, and 25.4% were non-families. 19.5% of all households were made up of individuals, and 7.0% had someone living alone who was 65 years of age or older. The average household size was 2.68 and the average family size was 3.13.

In the township the population was spread out, with 24.5% under the age of 18, 6.5% from 18 to 24, 29.3% from 25 to 44, 26.9% from 45 to 64, and 12.8% who were 65 years of age or older. The median age was 40 years. For every 100 females, there were 103.3 males. For every 100 females age 18 and over, there were 98.9 males.

The median income for a household in the township was $56,281, and the median income for a family was $64,338. Males had a median income of $42,015 versus $28,024 for females. The per capita income for the township was $29,153. About 2.8% of families and 3.9% of the population were below the poverty line, including 4.2% of those under age 18 and 8.0% of those age 65 or over.

== Climate ==
According to the Köppen climate classification system, Bedminster Township has a Hot-summer, Humid continental climate (Dfa). Dfa climates are characterized by at least one month having an average mean temperature ≤ 32.0 °F (0.0 °C), at least four months with an average mean temperature ≥ 50.0 °F (10.0 °C), at least one month with an average mean temperature ≥ 71.6 °F (22.0 °C) and no significant precipitation difference between seasons. Although most summer days are slightly humid in Bedminster Township, episodes of heat and high humidity can occur with heat index values > 105 °F (41 °C). Since 1981, the highest air temperature was 102.0 °F (38.9 °C) on July 22, 2011, and the highest daily average mean dew point was 74.4 °F (23.6 °C) on August 13, 2016. The average wettest month is July which corresponds with the annual peak in thunderstorm activity. Since 1981, the wettest calendar day was 6.68 inches (170 mm) on August 27, 2011. During the winter months, the average annual extreme minimum air temperature is −2.4 °F (−19.1 °C). Since 1981, the coldest air temperature was −13.4 °F (−25.2 °C) on January 22, 1984. Episodes of extreme cold and wind can occur with wind chill values < −13 °F (−25 °C). The average annual snowfall (Nov-Apr) is between 30 inches (76 cm) and 36 inches (91 cm). Ice storms and large snowstorms depositing ≥ 12 inches (30 cm) of snow occur once every few years, particularly during nor’easters from December through February.

Climate data for Bedminster Township, Elevation 413 ft (126 m), 1981–2010 normals, extremes 1981–2018
Month	Jan	Feb	Mar	Apr	May	Jun	Jul	Aug	Sep	Oct	Nov	Dec	Year
Record high °F (°C)	70.2 (21.2)	78.0 (25.6)	86.7 (30.4)	93.3 (34.1)	94.5 (34.7)	94.9 (34.9)	102.0 (38.9)	98.9 (37.2)	96.8 (36.0)	88.8 (31.6)	80.0 (26.7)	74.3 (23.5)	102.0 (38.9)
Mean daily maximum °F (°C)	38.1 (3.4)	41.7 (5.4)	50.1 (10.1)	62.2 (16.8)	72.3 (22.4)	80.7 (27.1)	84.8 (29.3)	83.1 (28.4)	76.3 (24.6)	64.8 (18.2)	53.8 (12.1)	42.4 (5.8)	62.6 (17.0)
Daily mean °F (°C)	29.4 (−1.4)	32.3 (0.2)	39.9 (4.4)	50.8 (10.4)	60.6 (15.9)	69.6 (20.9)	74.0 (23.3)	72.4 (22.4)	65.1 (18.4)	53.5 (11.9)	43.8 (6.6)	33.9 (1.1)	52.2 (11.2)
Mean daily minimum °F (°C)	20.6 (−6.3)	22.9 (−5.1)	29.7 (−1.3)	39.4 (4.1)	48.9 (9.4)	58.4 (14.7)	63.3 (17.4)	61.8 (16.6)	53.8 (12.1)	42.2 (5.7)	33.7 (0.9)	25.4 (−3.7)	41.8 (5.4)
Record low °F (°C)	−13.4 (−25.2)	−5.7 (−20.9)	1.4 (−17.0)	16.3 (−8.7)	32.1 (0.1)	39.8 (4.3)	46.2 (7.9)	40.7 (4.8)	33.8 (1.0)	22.8 (−5.1)	10.1 (−12.2)	−3.0 (−19.4)	−13.4 (−25.2)
Average precipitation inches (mm)	3.46 (88)	2.82 (72)	3.78 (96)	4.11 (104)	4.27 (108)	4.33 (110)	4.95 (126)	4.02 (102)	4.47 (114)	4.37 (111)	3.74 (95)	4.08 (104)	48.40 (1,229)
Average relative humidity (%)	67.9	64.3	59.7	58.8	63.1	69.0	69.0	71.6	72.7	71.2	69.9	69.9	67.3
Average dew point °F (°C)	20.1 (−6.6)	21.6 (−5.8)	27.0 (−2.8)	36.9 (2.7)	48.0 (8.9)	59.0 (15.0)	63.2 (17.3)	62.7 (17.1)	56.1 (13.4)	44.4 (6.9)	34.6 (1.4)	25.1 (−3.8)	41.7 (5.4)
Source: PRISM

== Ecology ==
According to the A. W. Kuchler U.S. potential natural vegetation types, Bedminster Twp would have a dominant vegetation type of Appalachian Oak (104) with a dominant vegetation form of Eastern Hardwood Forest (25). The plant hardiness zone is 6b with an average annual extreme minimum air temperature of −2.4 °F (−19.1 °C). The spring bloom typically begins by April 13 and fall color usually peaks by October 27.

== Transportation ==
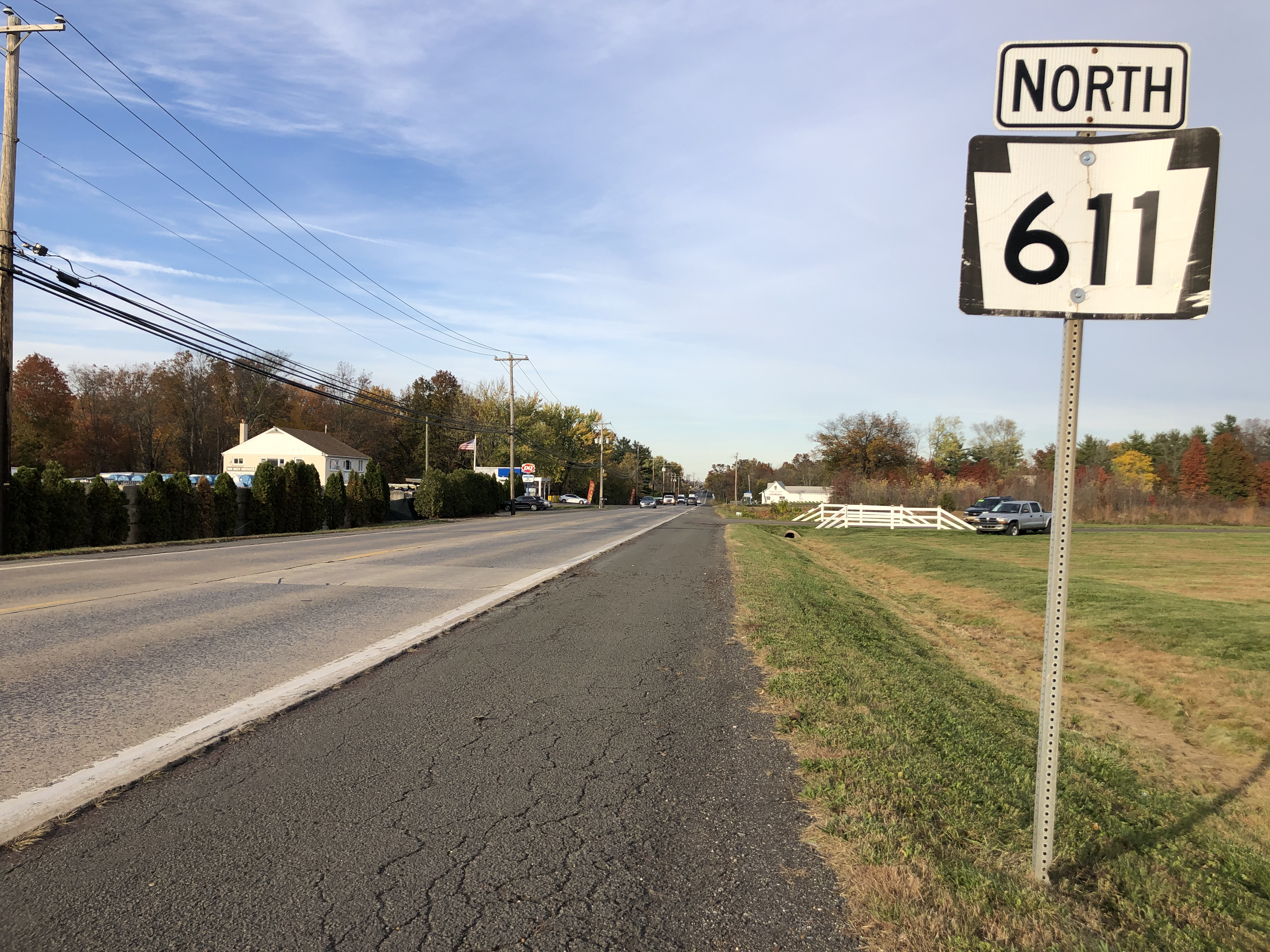
PA 611 northbound in Bedminster Township

As of 2022 there were 106.26 miles (171.01 km) of public roads in Bedminster Township, of which 45.07 miles (72.53 km) were maintained by the Pennsylvania Department of Transportation (PennDOT) and 61.19 miles (98.48 km) were maintained by the township.

The main highways serving Bedminster Township include Pennsylvania Route 113, Pennsylvania Route 313, Pennsylvania Route 413 and Pennsylvania Route 611. PA 113 follows a southwest-to-northeast alignment along Bedminster Road through the heart of the township, while PA 313 follows Dublin Pike along the township's southwestern border. PA 413 briefly enters the eastern edge of the township before terminating at PA 611, which follows a north–south alignment through eastern portions of Bedminster.

== Notable person ==
- Johann Adam Eyer, fraktur artist
