= Jennifer Brown =

Jennifer Brown may refer to:

- Jennifer Brown (author) (born 1972), American writer
- Jennifer Brown (singer) (born 1972), Swedish singer
- Jennifer Brown (statistician), New Zealand statistician
- Jennifer Brown (athlete) (born 1980), Canadian Paralympic athlete
- Jennifer Michelle Brown (born 1995), American actress and musician
- Jenn Brown (born 1981), American television personality
- Jennifer Jane Brown (2001–2002), first child of politician Gordon Brown
- Jennifer S. H. Brown (born 1940), American-Canadian historian

== See also ==
- Jenny Brown (disambiguation)
