= Pennsylvania Route 113 =

State highway in Pennsylvania, US

Pennsylvania Route 113
- PA 113 in red and PA 113 Truck in blue

Route information
- Maintained by PennDOT
- Length: 46.915 mi (75.502 km)

Major junctions
- South end: US 30 Bus. in Downingtown
- US 30 near Downingtown; PA 100 in Lionville; PA 401 near Chester Springs; PA 23 in Phoenixville; PA 29 in Rahns; PA 73 in Skippack; PA 63 in Harleysville; PA 309 near Souderton; PA 152 in Silverdale; PA 313 in Kulps Corner
- North end: PA 611 in Tinicum Township

Location
- Country: United States
- State: Pennsylvania
- Counties: Chester, Montgomery, Bucks

Highway system
- Pennsylvania State Route System; Interstate; US; State; Scenic; Legislative
← PA 112	→ PA 114

Pennsylvania Route 113 (PA 113) is a 46.9-mile-long (75.5 km) state route in eastern Pennsylvania. The southern terminus of the route is at U.S. Route 30 Business (US 30 Bus.) in Downingtown. Its northern terminus is at PA 611 in Tinicum Township. The route is signed as north–south although its exact alignment follows a northeast–southwest routing. The route serves Chester, Montgomery, and Bucks counties, passing through Lionville, Phoenixville, Trappe, Skippack, Harleysville, Souderton, and Silverdale along the way.

PA 113 was originally designated by 1927 to run from PA 23 and PA 29 in Phoenixville to US 1 and PA 101 in Penndel. By 1930, PA 113 was extended from Phoenixville southwest to US 30 in Downingtown and south from Penndel to US 13 in Eddington. The route was moved to its current alignment between Phoenixville and Rahns in 1937, switching routes with PA 29. In 1946, PA 113 was realigned at Kulps Corner to head to is current northern terminus, replacing part of PA 413. The former PA 113 between Kulps Corner and Eddington became PA 313, US 202, PA 413, PA 513, and Bensalem Boulevard. PA 113 was realigned to bypass Kimberton in the 1970s and Harleysville in the 1980s. In 2009, the new Gay Street Bridge over the French Creek was opened, replacing a bridge that was built in 1926.

== Route description ==
=== Chester County ===
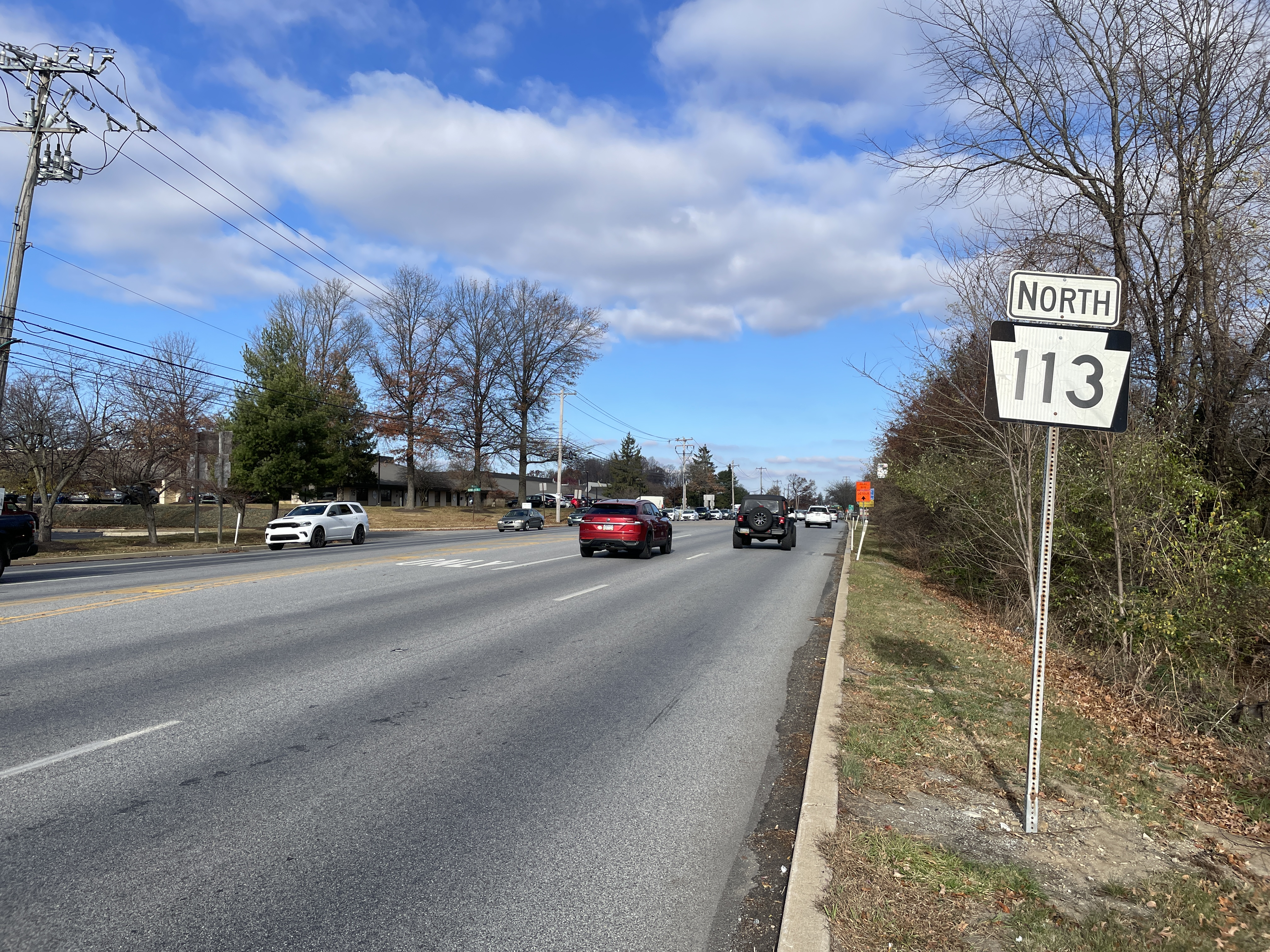
PA 113 northbound past PA 100 in Lionville

PA 113 begins at an intersection with US 30 Bus. (Lancaster Avenue) in the borough of Downingtown in Chester County, heading north on West Uwchlan Avenue, a two-lane divided highway. The road passes through residential areas and turns into a three-lane road with a center left-turn lane. The route crosses into East Caln Township and becomes a divided highway again as it reaches a partial interchange with the US 30 freeway, with access to westbound US 30 and from eastbound US 30. PA 113 becomes undivided again and continues northeast through wooded areas of homes with a few businesses, gaining a northbound truck lane while ascending the north hills of the Great Valley. The road narrows back to two lanes before it enters Uwchlan Township. PA 113 widens to four lanes as it continues through suburban areas, passing to the northwest of the Downingtown High School East Campus. The route heads to the north and gains a center left-turn lane as it runs through commercial areas in Lionville. PA 113 curves to the northeast again and crosses PA 100, where the name becomes East Uwchlan Avenue. Past this intersection, the road passes west of a park and ride lot and heads near industrial parks before it comes to a bridge over the Pennsylvania Turnpike (I-76). The route passes near residential areas with some farmland before it crosses into West Pikeland Township.

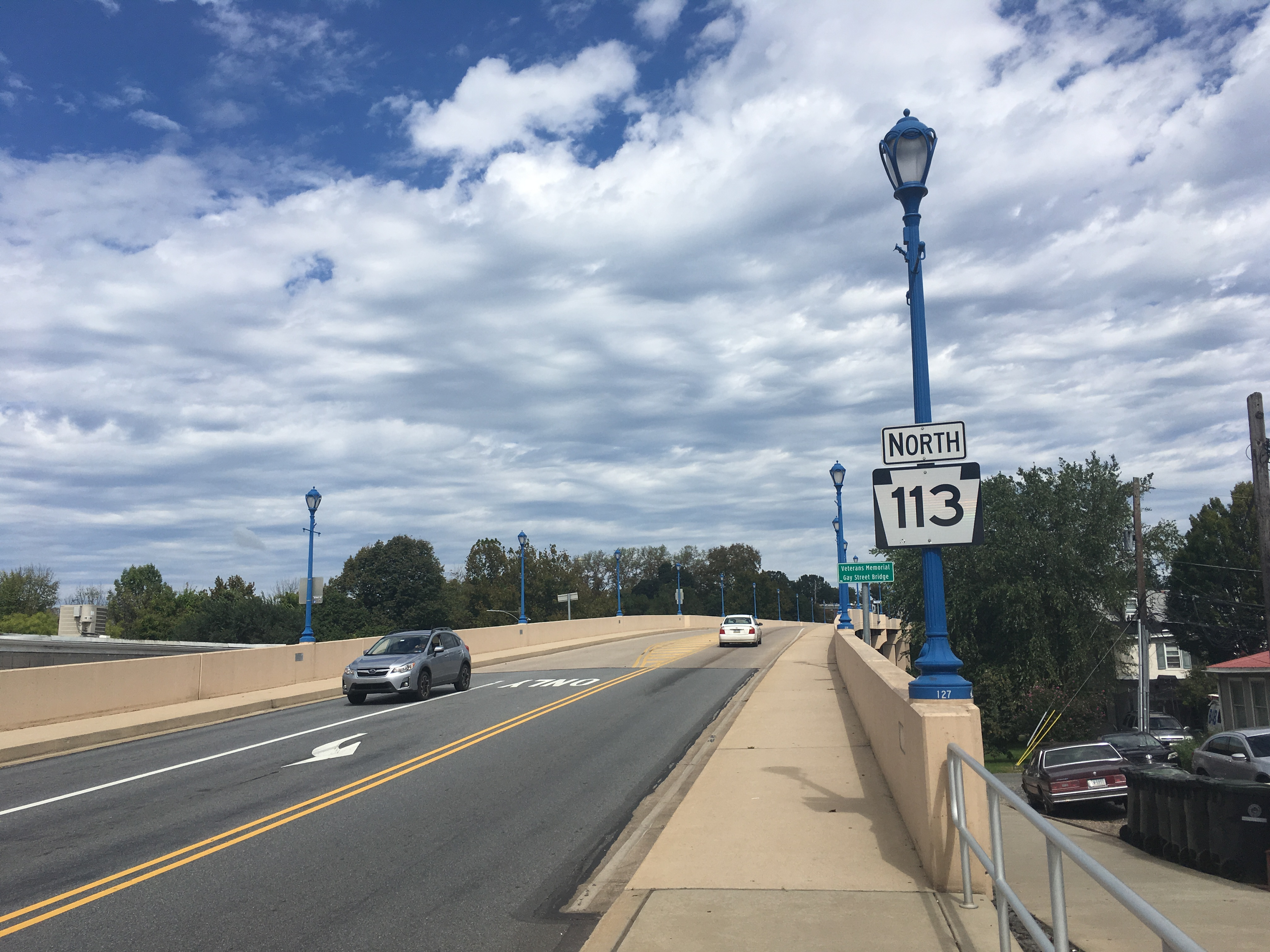
PA 113 northbound across the Gay Street Bridge in Phoenixville

Here, PA 113 becomes Kimberton Road and narrows to two lanes as it comes to an intersection with PA 401 at Opperman's Corner. The road continues northeast through wooded areas with some fields and residences, passing through the community of Chester Springs and crossing Pickering Creek. The route heads into East Pikeland Township and becomes Pike Springs Road as it continues through more rural areas with some development. PA 113 reaches the community of Kimberton and curves to the east, with the name becoming Kimberton Road again. The road passes through areas of homes and businesses and becomes the border between Schuylkill Township to the north and the borough of Phoenixville to the south at the Township Line Road intersection. The route passes more development and fully enters Schuylkill Township before crossing into Phoenixville and coming to the PA 23 junction.

At this point, PA 113 turns southeast to form a concurrency with PA 23 on Nutt Road, a three-lane road with a center left-turn lane. The road passes businesses and crosses under an abandoned railroad line, at which point it continues through residential areas. PA 113 splits from PA 23 by heading northeast on two-lane Bridge Street. The road passes homes before heading into commercial areas. The route continues east into downtown Phoenixville, where it turns north to cross over French Creek, the Schuylkill River Trail, and Smithworks Boulevard at the site of the former Phoenix Iron Works site on the Gay Street Bridge. PA 113 enters the north side of Phoenixville, becoming Franklin Street and heading into residential areas before turning east onto Emmett Street. The route turns north onto Dayton Street before it curves northeast along Freemont Street. The name changes to Black Rock Road and the road continues through wooded areas with some residential development, curving to the north before a turn to the northwest.

=== Montgomery and Bucks counties ===
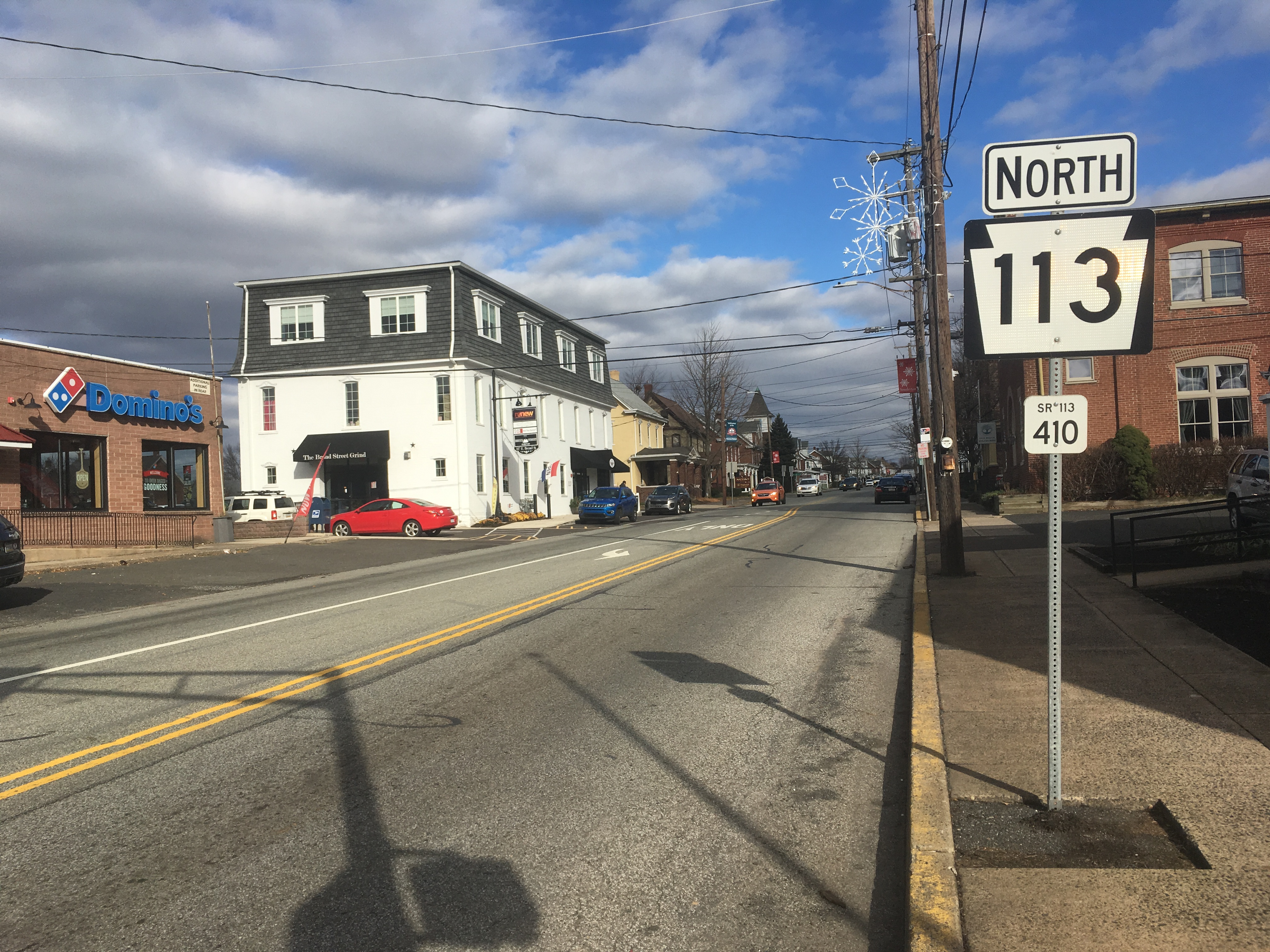
PA 113 northbound in Souderton

PA 113 crosses the Schuylkill River on the Black Rock Bridge into Upper Providence Township in Montgomery County and heads into fields, turning northeast onto Trappe Road. The road continues near residential neighborhoods and passes under the US 422 freeway without an interchange. The route heads through a mix of fields and homes before it crosses into the borough of Trappe. Here, PA 113 becomes 3rd Avenue and runs through residential areas, crossing Main Street. Following this, the road passes through farmland before it enters Perkiomen Township and becomes Bridge Road, passing to the west of an industrial park. PA 113 curves east and passes homes as it comes to an intersection with PA 29 in Rahns. The road crosses over the Perkiomen Trail and the Perkiomen Creek on a bridge into Skippack Township and passes through wooded residential areas, turning back to the northeast. The route passes through a mix of fields and development as it crosses the Skippack Trail and runs to the southeast of State Correctional Institution – Phoenix, heading through the community of Creamery. PA 113 passes near more homes and comes to a junction with PA 73 in a commercial area.

The road heads past more residential development and curves north, at which point it crosses into Lower Salford Township and becomes Harleysville Pike. The route passes through a mix of fields and woods with some homes, turning to the northeast in the community of Lederach. PA 113 heads north through an S-curve near more residential development before it turns northeast and gains a center left-turn lane as it comes to an intersection with PA 63 in Harleysville. The road becomes two-lane Souderton-Harleysville Pike and passes near residential neighborhoods and farm fields before it crosses into Franconia Township. The route runs through agricultural areas with a few homes and comes to a bridge over the Pennsylvania Turnpike Northeast Extension (I-476). PA 113 passes through more rural areas before it heads past a few businesses between Allentown Road and Godshall Road in the community of Franconia. The road curves east into areas of homes and crosses into the borough of Souderton. At this point, the route becomes Main Street and turns to the southeast, passing more homes and a few businesses. PA 113 heads into the downtown area and turns northeast onto Broad Street, immediately crossing the Bethlehem Line, a railroad line that is owned by SEPTA and operated by the Pennsylvania Northeastern Railroad, at-grade. The road runs past more homes before it gains a center left-turn lane and passes businesses.

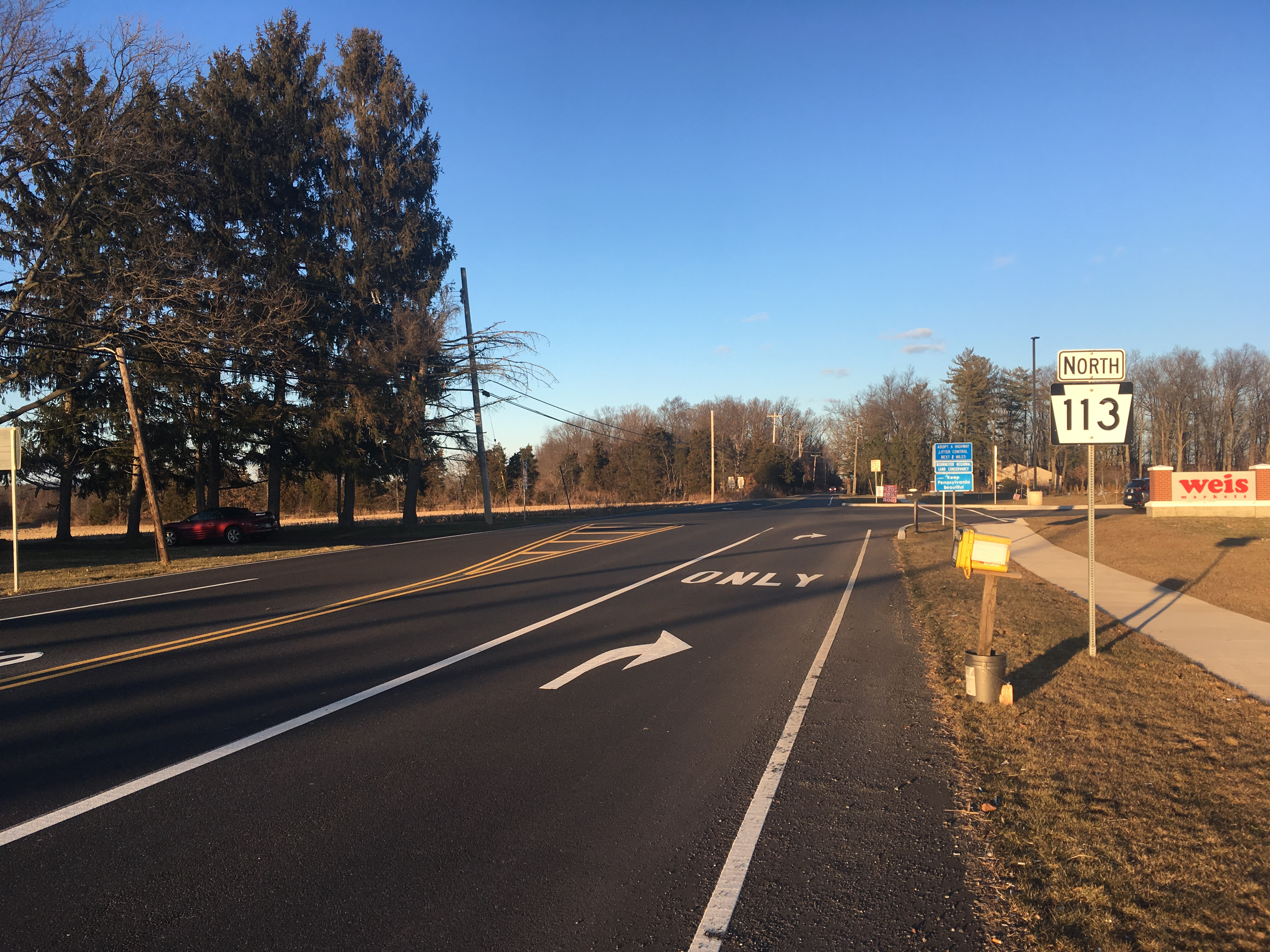
PA 113 northbound past PA 313 in Bedminster Township

After crossing County Line Road, PA 113 enters Hilltown Township in Bucks County and becomes Souderton Road, passing more businesses as a five-lane road with a center left-turn lane. The road comes to an interchange with the PA 309 freeway, where it is briefly a divided highway, before regaining a center left-turn lane and reaching an intersection with Bethlehem Pike. The route narrows back to two lanes and runs through a mix of farmland and woodland with some housing developments. Farther northeast, PA 113 crosses into the borough of Silverdale and becomes Main Street, passing homes and a few businesses. In this borough, the route forms a short wrong-way concurrency with PA 152. The road crosses back into Hilltown Township and becomes Souderton Road again, running through more farmland with some woods and residences. PA 113 passes through the community of Blooming Glen and continues through rural areas to an intersection with PA 313 in Kulps Corner, at which point there are a few businesses. Upon crossing PA 313, the route heads into Bedminster Township as Bedminster Road, running through agricultural and wooded areas with occasional homes. The road heads northeast and passes through the community of Bedminster. Farther northeast, PA 113 crosses the Tohickon Creek into Tinicum Township and comes to its northern terminus at an intersection with PA 611. The road continues past this intersection as township-maintained Hollow Horn Road.

== History ==
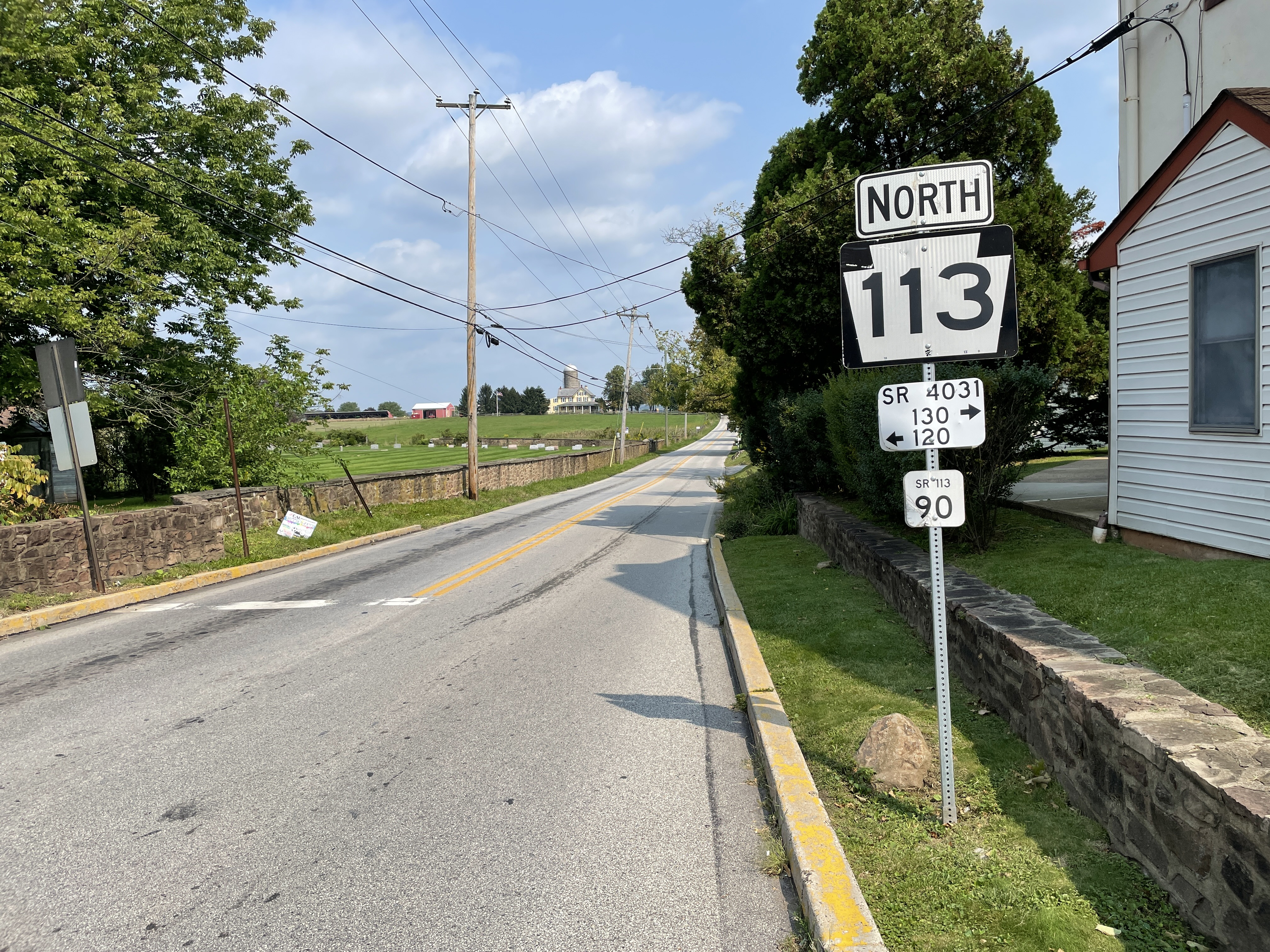
PA 113 northbound past Main Street in Trappe

When Pennsylvania first legislated routes in 1911, what would become PA 113 was designated as Legislative Route 270 between Downingtown and Phoenixville, Legislative Route 202 between Phoenixville and Collegeville, Legislative Route 158 between Collegeville and Iron Bridge, Legislative Route 270 between Iron Bridge and Blooming Glen, Legislative Route 154 between Dublin and Doylestown, Legislative Route 178 between Doylestown and Buckingham, and Legislative Route 152 between Buckingham and Langhorne. PA 113 was first designated by 1927 to run from PA 23 and PA 29 in Phoenixville east to US 1 (now US 1 Bus.) and PA 101 in Penndel. PA 113 continued northeast from Phoenixville through Collegeville and resumed along its present-day alignment in Iron Bridge. The route ran northeast through Harleysville, Souderton, and Silverdale before it turned southeast at Kulps Corner. From here, PA 113 passed through Dublin before it reached Doylestown, where it briefly ran concurrent south on US 611 on Main Street before heading east along US 122 (now US 202) at State Street to Buckingham. PA 113 split from US 122 here and ran southeast through Newtown and then south through Langhorne to Penndel. By 1930, PA 113 was extended southwest to US 30 (now US 30 Bus.) in Downingtown along its present routing. The route was also extended from Penndel south through Hulmeville to US 13 near Eddington. PA 113 and PA 29 switched alignments between Phoenixville and Rahns in 1937, with PA 113 now following its present alignment between those two places. By 1940, PA 113 was paved from northeast of Downingtown to Lionville and between Hulmeville and Eddington.

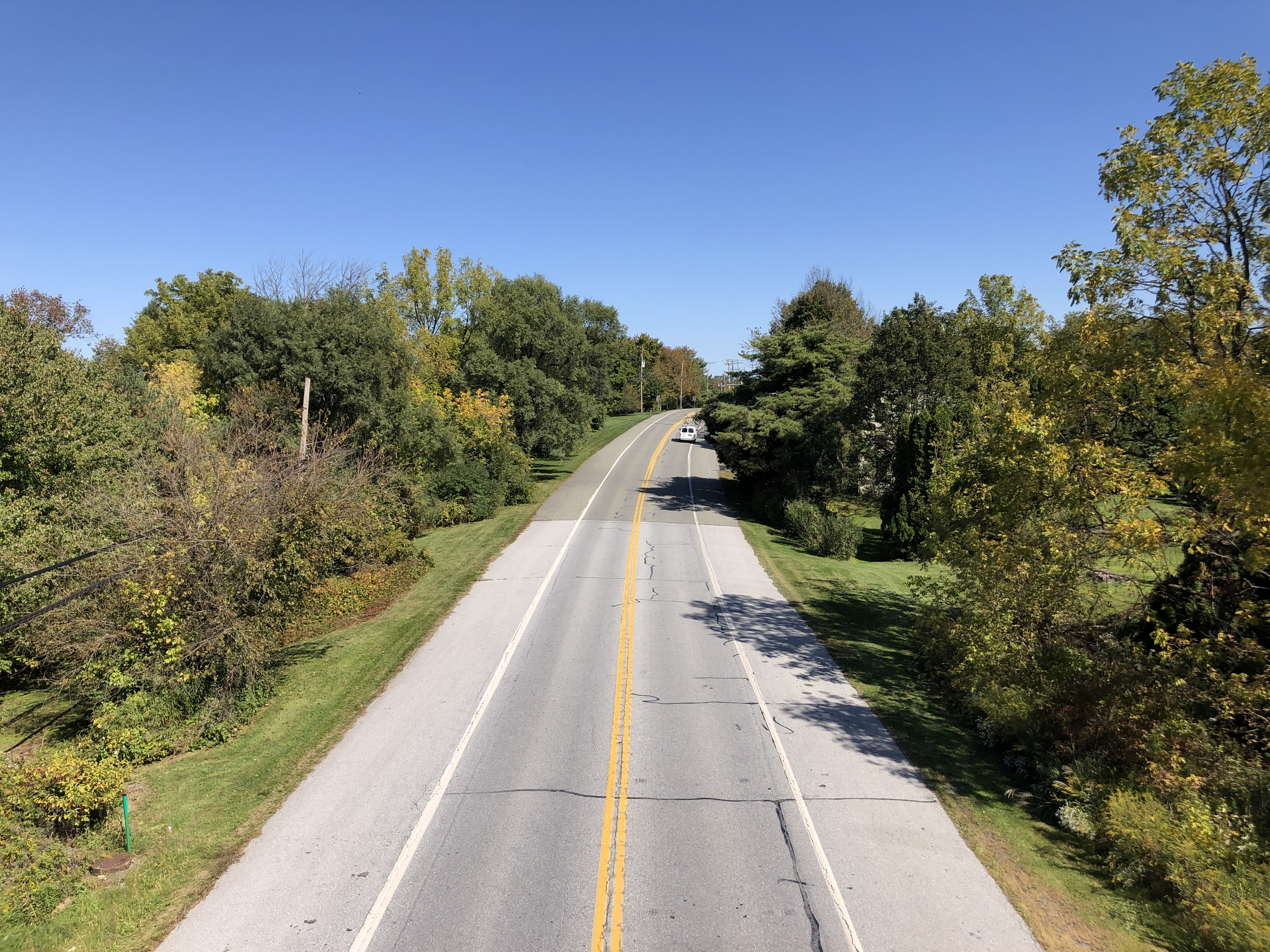
PA 113 northbound in Upper Providence Township

In 1946, PA 113 was realigned to head to its current northern terminus at US 611 (now PA 611), replacing a portion of PA 413 between Kulps Corner and US 611. The former alignment of PA 113 east of Kulps Corner became PA 313 between Kulps Corner and Doylestown, solely US 202 between Doylestown and Buckingham, PA 413 between Buckingham and Penndel, PA 513 between Penndel and Hulmeville, and present-day Bensalem Boulevard between Hulmeville and US 13. PA 113 was slightly re-routed in the 1970s when a bypass was constructed around Kimberton. The historic roadbed is currently Kimberton Road and Hares Hill Road. In the 1980s, PA 113 was rerouted to bypass the center of Harleysville, eliminating a short concurrency with PA 63. In 2008, the structurally deficient Gay Street Bridge over the French Creek in Phoenixville, built in 1926, was closed and demolished in a project to build a new bridge. The new Gay Street Bridge opened in fall 2009 at a cost of $17 million.

Sly Fox Brewery, which operates a brewpub on PA 113 in Phoenixville, produces Route 113 IPA, an India Pale Ale whose label features the black-and-white keystone silhouette of the route's sign.

== Major intersections ==
County	Location	mi	km	Destinations	Notes
Chester	Downingtown	0.000	0.000	US 30 Bus. (East Lancaster Avenue)	Southern terminus
Chester	East Caln Township	0.584	0.940	US 30 west – Coatesville, Lancaster	Interchange; access to US 30 west and from US 30 east
Chester	Uwchlan Township	3.935	6.333	PA 100 (Pottstown Pike) to Penna Turnpike – Pottstown, Exton	
Chester	West Pikeland Township	5.902	9.498	PA 401 (Conestoga Road) – Elverson, Malvern	
Chester	Phoenixville	12.791	20.585	PA 23 west (Schuylkill Road) – Pottstown	Southern terminus of concurrency
Chester	Phoenixville	13.260	21.340	PA 23 east (Nutt Road)	Northern terminus of concurrency
Chester	Phoenixville	13.526	21.768	Gay Street Bridge over French Creek	
Schuylkill River		16.121	25.944	Black Rock Bridge	
Montgomery	Perkiomen Township	21.098	33.954	PA 29 – Schwenksville, Collegeville	Southern terminus of PA 113 Alternate Truck
Montgomery	Skippack Township	24.362	39.207	PA 73 (Skippack Pike) – Schwenksville, Skippack	Northern terminus of PA 113 Alternate Truck
Montgomery	Lower Salford Township	28.506	45.876	PA 63 (Main Street) – Green Lane, Harleysville	
Bucks	Hilltown Township	34.179	55.006	PA 309 – Quakertown, Montgomeryville	Interchange
Bucks	Silverdale	37.063	59.647	PA 152 north (Walnut Street)	Southern terminus of concurrency
Bucks	Silverdale	37.176	59.829	PA 152 south (Baringer Avenue)	Northern terminus of concurrency
Bucks	Hilltown–Bedminster township line	40.801	65.663	PA 313 (Dublin Pike)	
Bucks	Tinicum Township	46.915	75.502	PA 611 (Easton Road)	Northern terminus
1.000 mi = 1.609 km; 1.000 km = 0.621 mi: Concurrency terminus; Incomplete access

== PA 113 Alternate Truck ==
PA Route 113 Alternate Truck
- Location: Montgomery County, Pennsylvania
- Existed: 2013–present

Pennsylvania Route 113 Alternate Truck is a truck route of PA 113, bypassing a weight-restricted bridge over a branch of the Skippack Creek in Skippack Township, on which trucks over 34 tons and combination loads over 40 tons are prohibited. The route originally followed PA 29 and PA 73, but in 2019, it was rerouted along PA 29, Plank Road, and PA 73 due to a weight-restricted bridge on PA 73 west of Plank Road. It was signed in 2013.

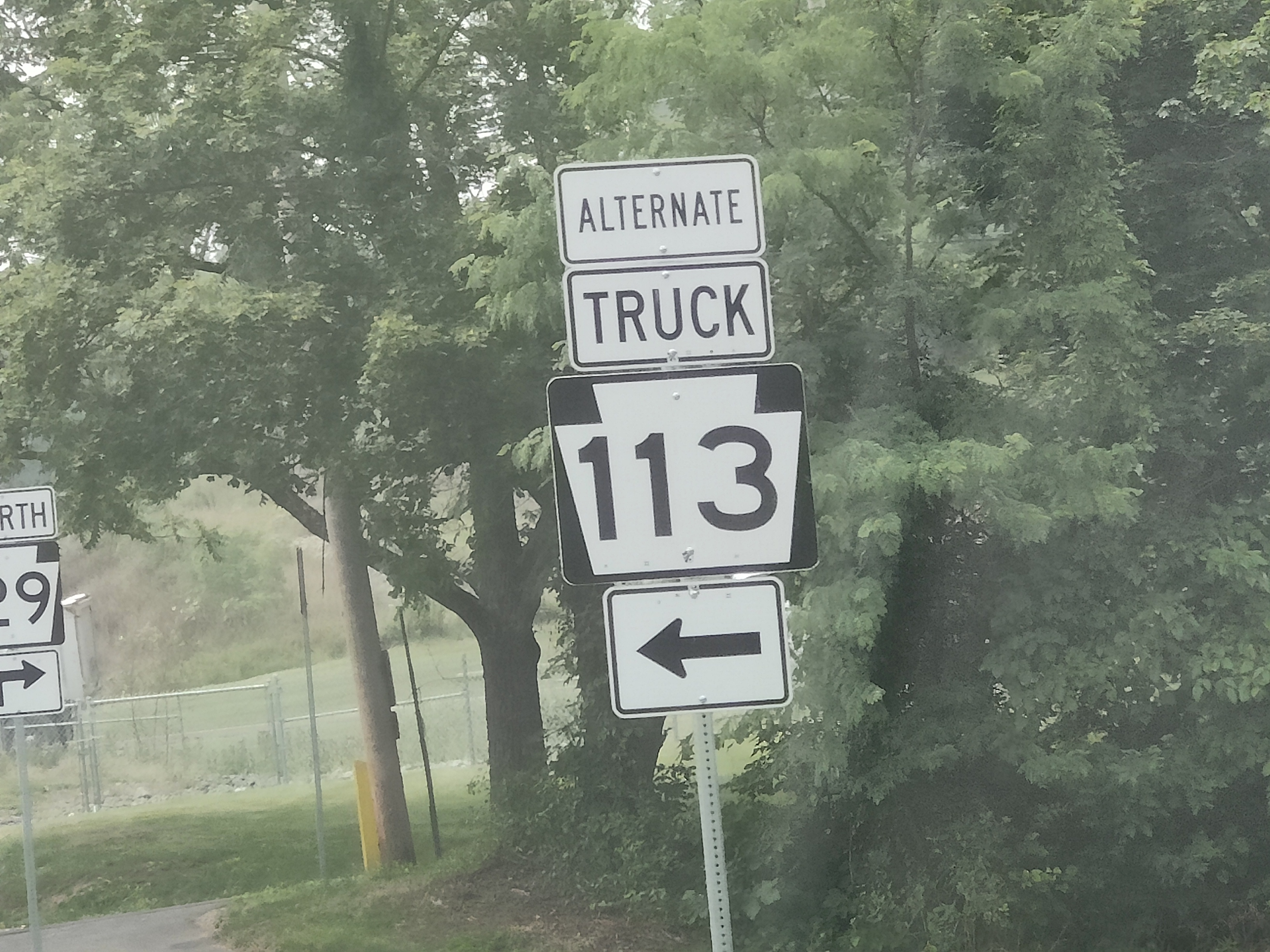
PA 113 Alternate Truck from Plank Road.
