= Dielman Kolb Homestead =

Historic house in Pennsylvania, United States

- U.S. National Register of Historic Places
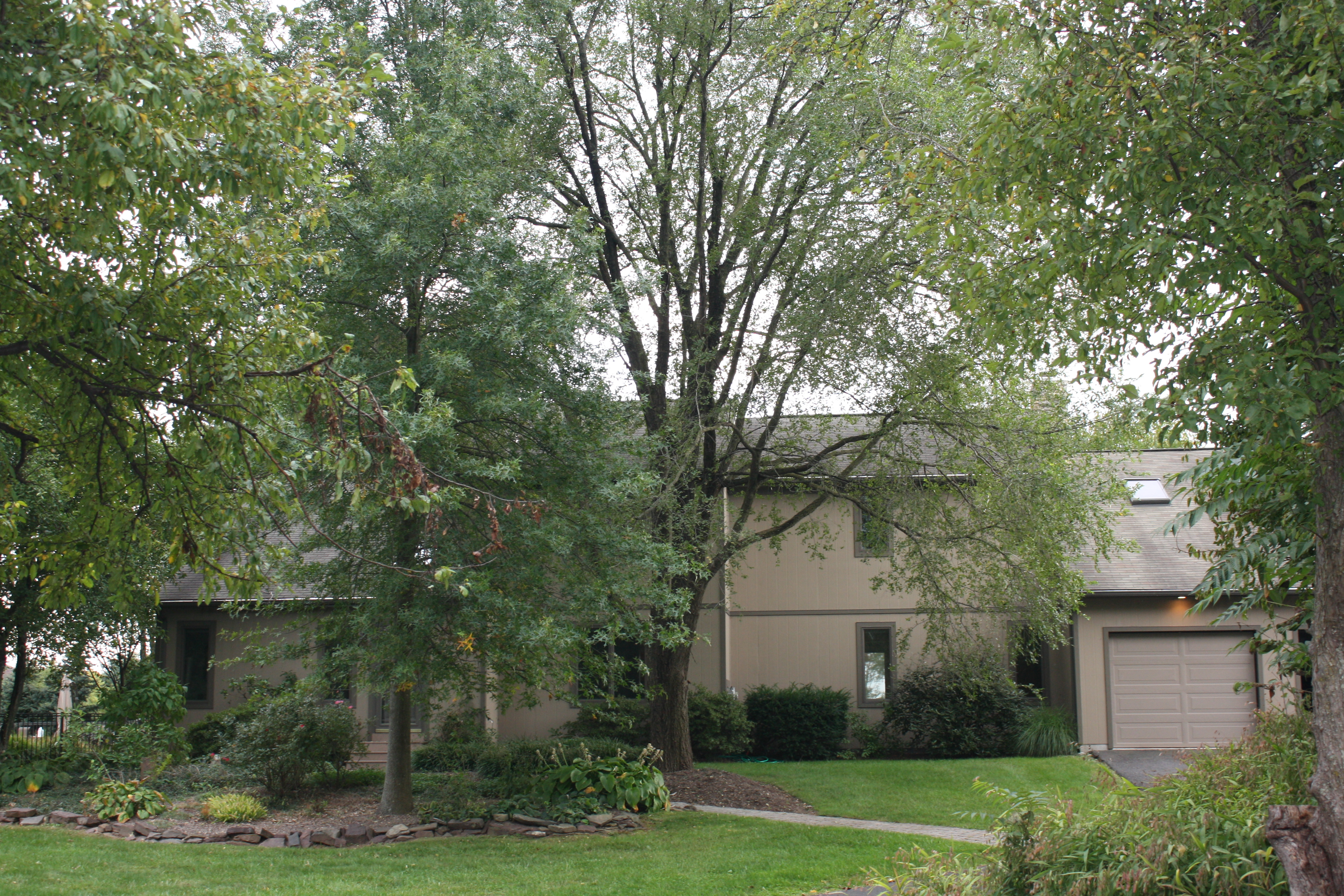
- Dielman Kolb Homestead, September 2012

- Location within Pennsylvania Location within the United States
- Location: South of Lederach on Kinsey Road, Lower Salford Township, Pennsylvania
- Coordinates: 40°14′56″N 75°24′6″W
- Area: 2 acres (0.81 ha)
- Built: 1717
- Architectural style: Germanic House
- NRHP reference No.: 73001647
- Added to NRHP: August 17, 1973

Dielman Kolb Homestead is a historic home located at 331 Kinsey Road, near Lederach in Lower Salford Township, Montgomery County, Pennsylvania. The house was built in 1717, and is a 2 1/2-story, gambrel roofed dwelling with a modified Germanic floor plan. It has an attached summer kitchen.

It was added to the National Register of Historic Places in 1973.
