= Lederach, Pennsylvania =

Unincorporated community in Pennsylvania, US

- Unincorporated community
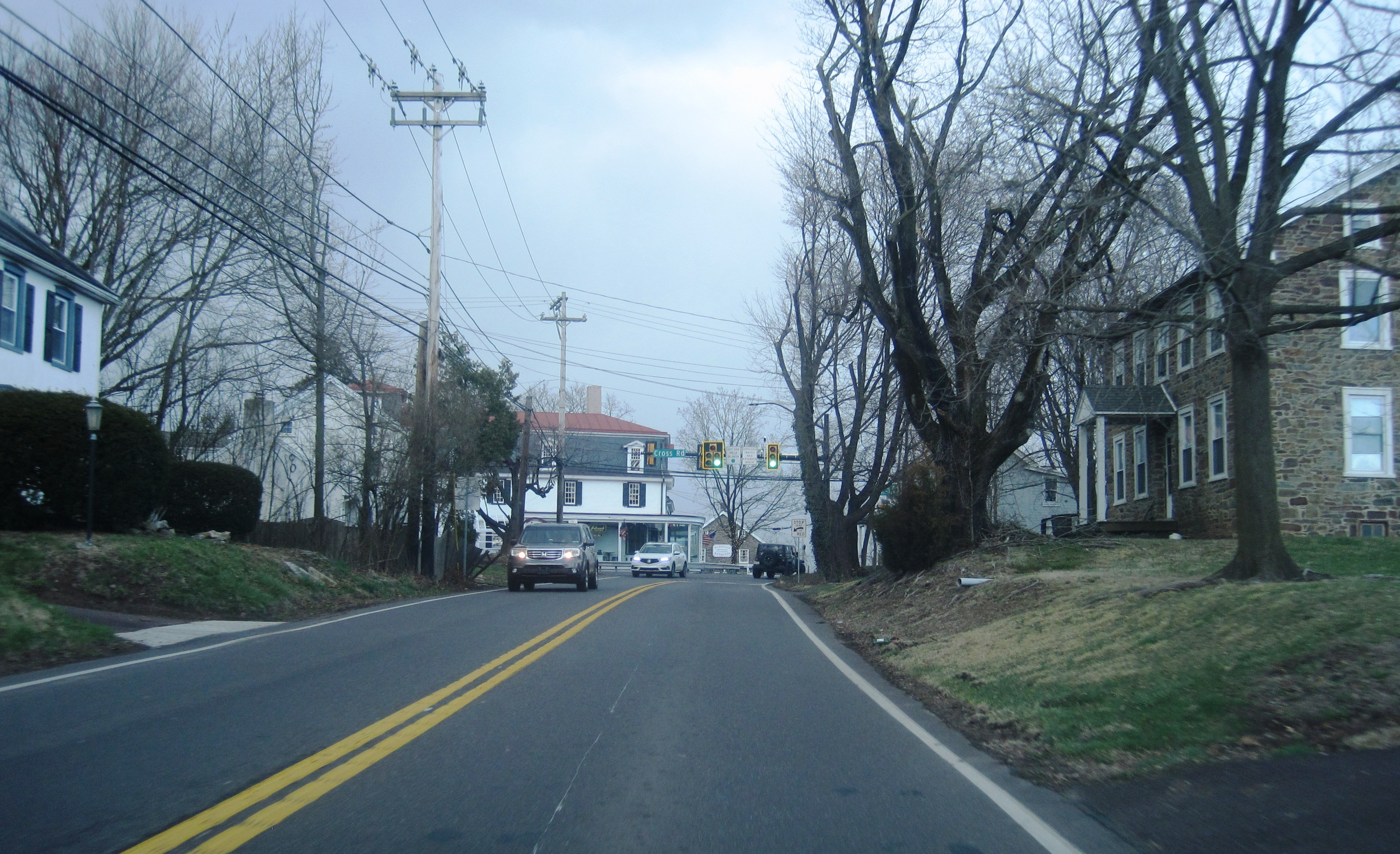
- Along northbound PA 113

- Location within Pennsylvania
- Coordinates: 40°15′42″N 75°24′22″W
- Country: United States
- State: Pennsylvania
- County: Montgomery
- Township: Lower Salford
- Elevation: 367 ft (112 m)
- Time zone: UTC-5 (Eastern (EST))
  - Summer (DST): UTC-4 (EDT)
- ZIP code: 19450
- Area codes: 215, 267 and 445
- GNIS feature ID: 1179109

Lederach is an unincorporated community in Lower Salford Township in Montgomery County, Pennsylvania, United States. Lederach is located at the intersection of Pennsylvania Route 113, Salfordville Road/Morris Road, Old Skippack Road, and Cross Road.
