= Gay Street Bridge (Phoenixville, Pennsylvania) =

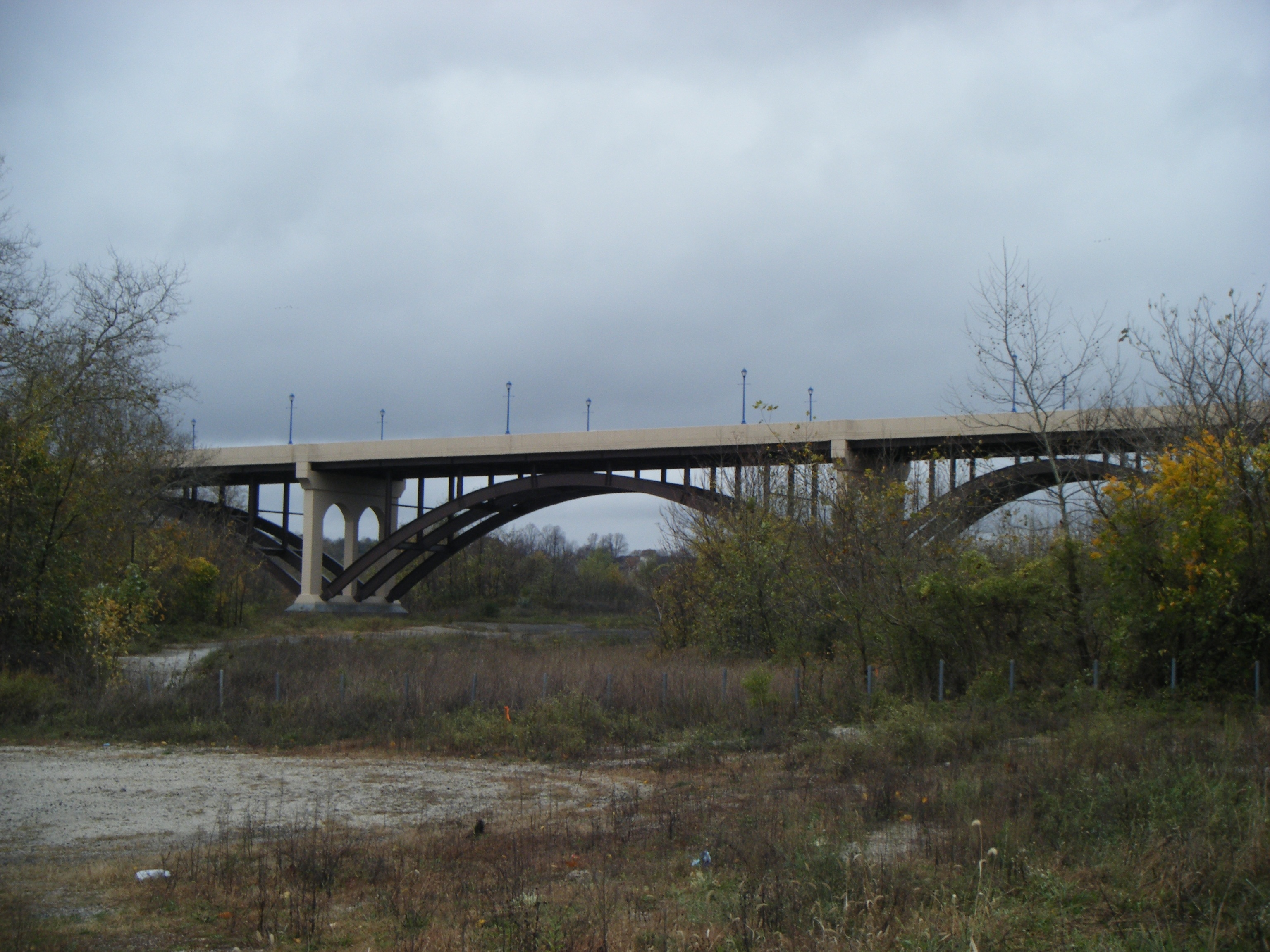
- The third and current bridge in 2012
- Coordinates: 40°08′08.1″N 75°31′07.1″W
- Carries: Two lanes of PA 113 (Gay Street)
- Crosses: French Creek
- Locale: Chester, Pennsylvania, United States
- Official name: Veterans Memorial Gay Street Bridge
- Maintained by: Pennsylvania Department of Transportation (PennDOT)

Characteristics
- Design: Girder
- Total length: 975.1 feet (297.2 m)
- Width: 36.1 feet (11.0 m)
- Longest span: 123 feet (37 m)

History
- Opened: November 19, 1883 (first); September 4, 1926 (second); October 16, 2009 (current)

Statistics
- Daily traffic: 7,650 (2021)

Location
- Interactive map of Gay Street Bridge

Gay Street Bridge, officially known as the Veterans Memorial Gay Street Bridge, is a crossing of French Creek in the borough of Phoenixville, Pennsylvania. The bridge connects the north and south sides of the borough, carrying Pennsylvania Route 113. The first iteration of the bridge was constructed in 1888, the second in 1926, and the third and current in 2009.

== History ==
=== 1883 bridge ===
The original Gay Street Bridge was constructed in 1883 by the local Phoenix Iron Company. Situated slightly west of the present-day alignment of the bridge, it was built with the iron company's Phoenix columns, which later became popularly used nationwide in bridge construction.

=== 1926 bridge ===
By 1922, the condition of original bridge had begun to decline. In 1924, construction began on a new bridge, with the second Gay Street Bridge opening on September 4, 1926. The open-spandrel arch bridge was made of reinforced concrete and was twelve spans, the longest bridge in Chester County at that time.

=== 2009 bridge ===
By 2008, plans had been in place to replace the 82-year-old bridge due to deteriorating concrete. The second bridge officially closed on April 2, 2008, and was subsequently demolished. The third and current Gay Street Bridge was constructed from 2008 to 2009, officially opening on October 16, 2009. The current bridge is a nine-span steel structure constructed at a cost of $17 million.

== Gallery ==
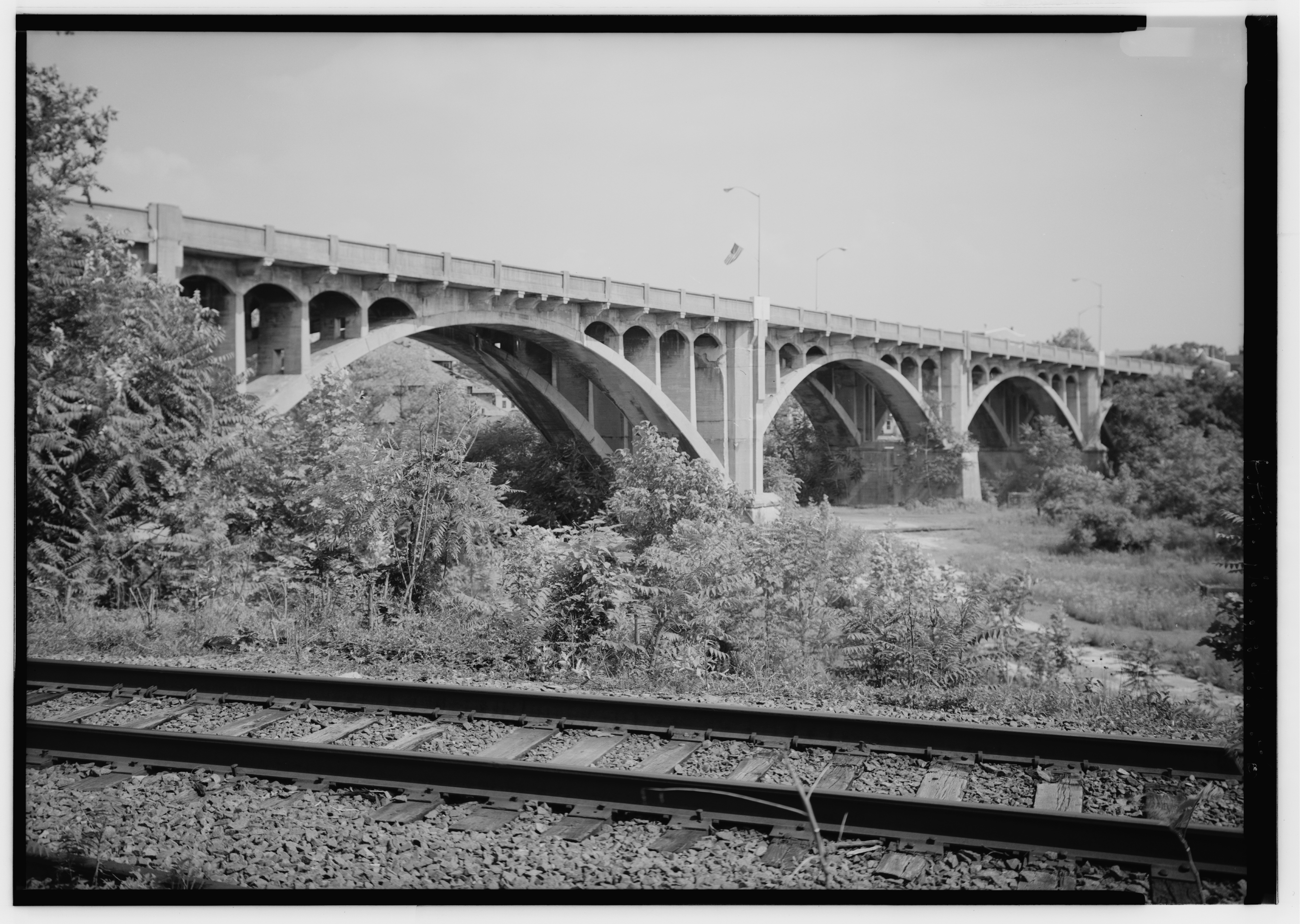
The second (1926) bridge pictured in 1999

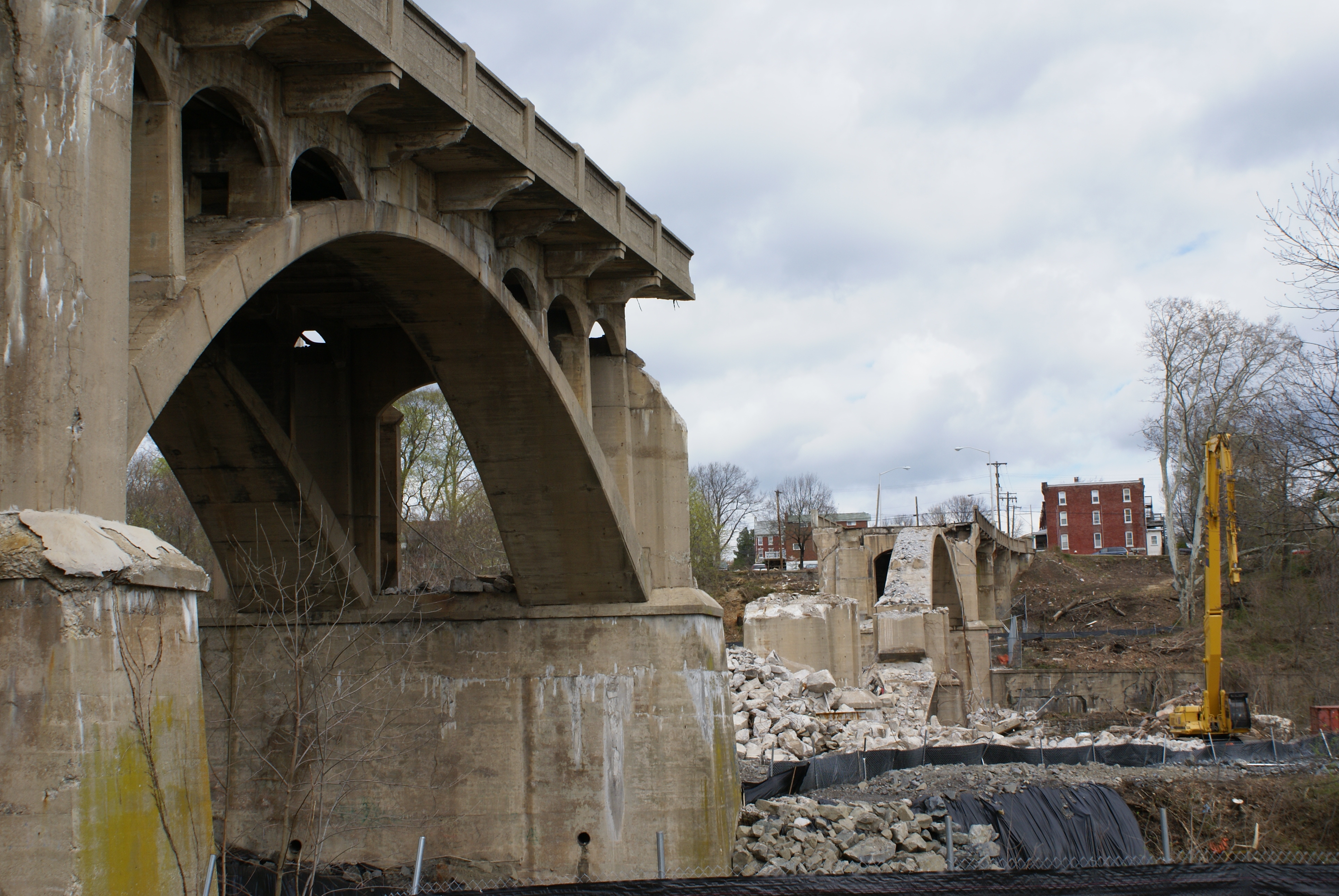
Demolition of the 1926 bridge in 2008

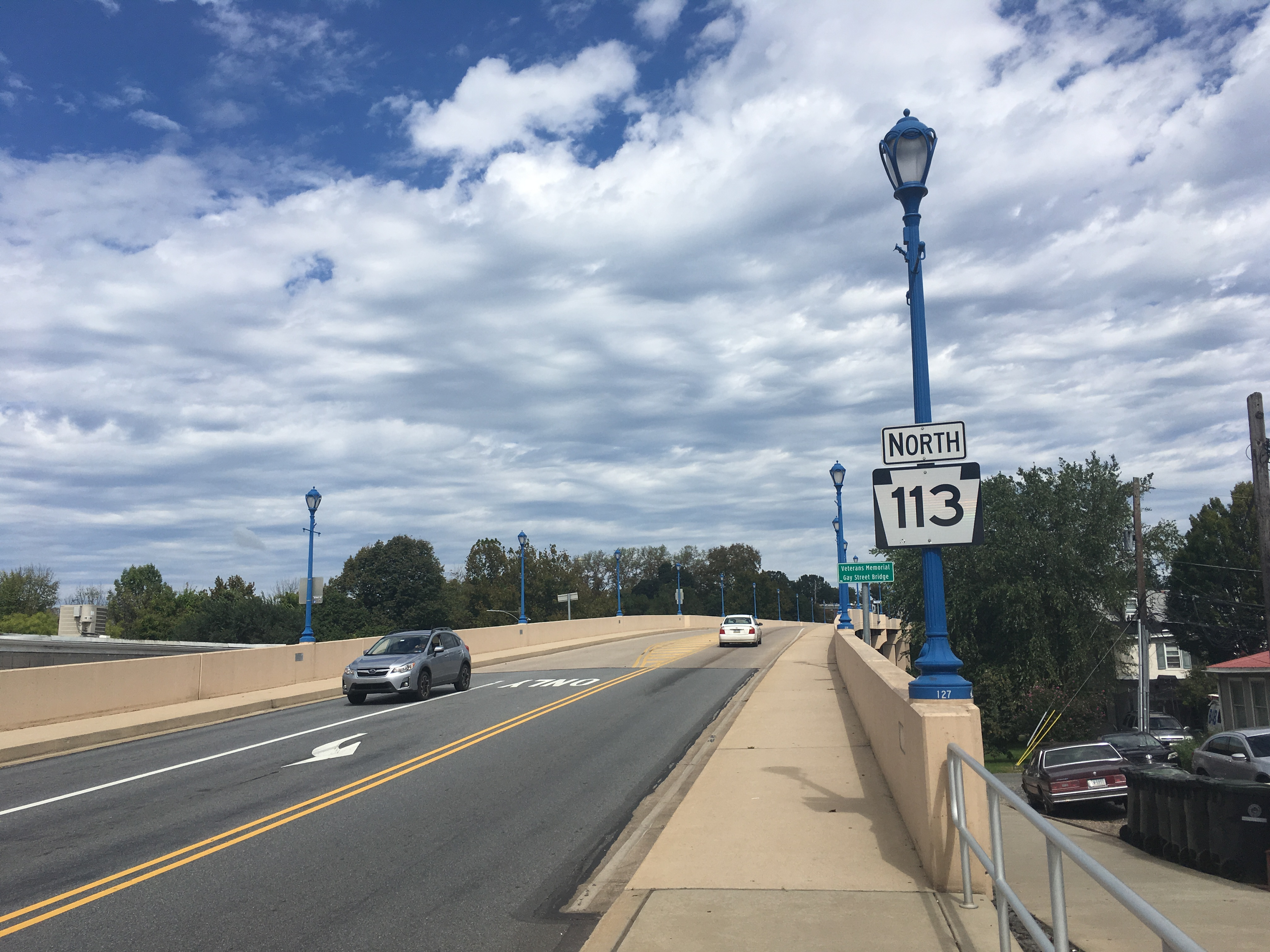
The current bridge in 2018
