= Creamery, Pennsylvania =

Unincorporated community in Pennsylvania, US

- Unincorporated community
- Location within Pennsylvania
- Coordinates: 40°13′12″N 75°24′59″W
- Country: United States
- State: Pennsylvania
- County: Montgomery
- Township: Skippack
- Elevation: 266 ft (81 m)
- Time zone: UTC-5 (Eastern (EST))
  - Summer (DST): UTC-4 (EDT)
- ZIP code: 19430
- Area codes: 610 and 484
- GNIS feature ID: 1172663

Creamery is an unincorporated community in Skippack Township in Montgomery County, Pennsylvania, United States. Creamery is located at the intersection of Pennsylvania Route 113 and Creamery Road.
