= Lower Salford Township, Pennsylvania =

Township in Pennsylvania, US

- Township
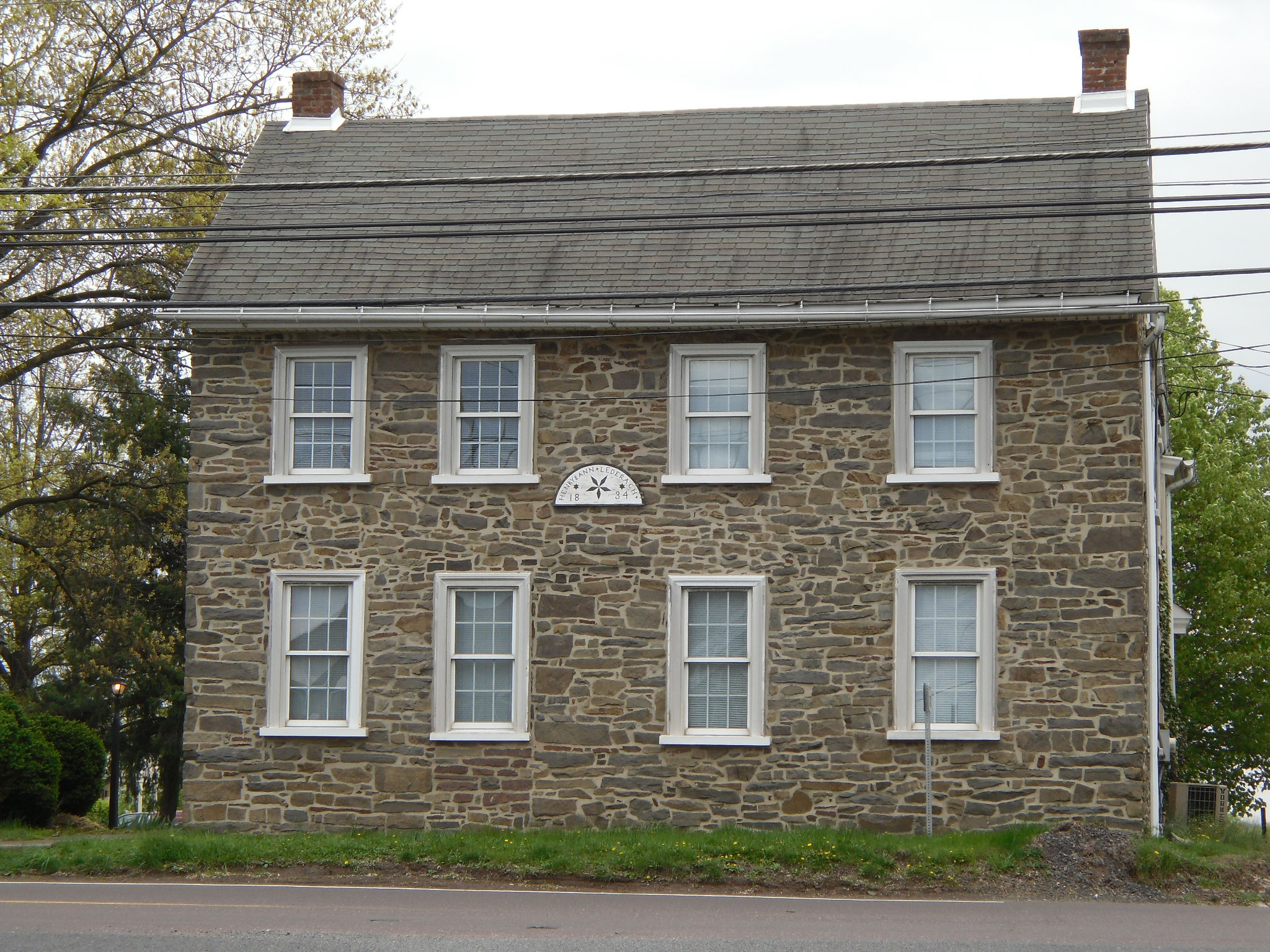
- An old stone house in Lederach in Lower Salford Township

- Flag Seal

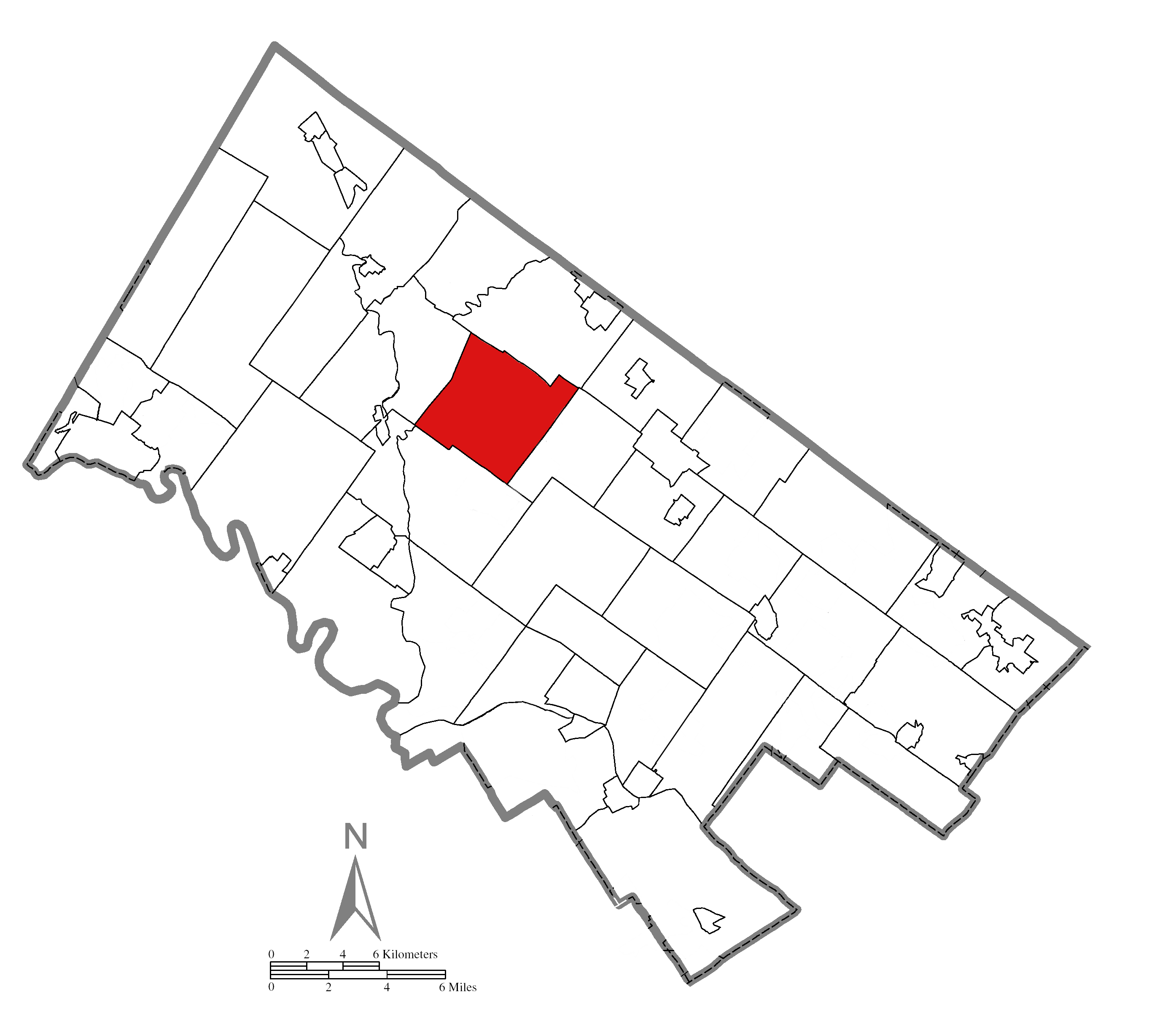
- Location of Lower Salford Township in Montgomery County

- Location of Lower Salford within the state of Pennsylvania Location of Lower Salford within the United States of America
- Coordinates: 40°15′37.9″N 75°23′58.2″W
- Country: United States
- State: Pennsylvania
- County: Montgomery
- Founded: 1741 (split from Salford)
- Founded by: Jacob Reiff

Government
  - Type: Second Class Township
  - Body: Board of Supervisors
  - Chairman: Keith Bergman
  - Vice-Chairman: David Scheuren
  - Supervisors: Kent Krauss; Marybeth Morrell; Russell Alderfer

Area
  - Total: 14.49 sq mi (37.54 km^{2})
  - Land: 14.44 sq mi (37.41 km^{2})
  - Water: 0.050 sq mi (0.13 km^{2}) 0.69%

Dimensions
  - Length: 5.2 mi (8.4 km)
  - Width: 5.7 mi (9.2 km)
- Elevation: 276 ft (84 m)

Population (2020)
  - Total: 15,896
  - Estimate (2024): 16,425
  - Density: 1,067.4/sq mi (412.13/km^{2})
- Time zone: UTC-5 (EST)
  - Summer (DST): UTC-4 (EDT)
- ZIP Code: 19438
- Area codes: 215, 267, 445
- FIPS code: 42-091-45096
- Website: Township website

Lower Salford is a township in Montgomery County, Pennsylvania, United States. It is located one mile west of the Lansdale exit of the Pennsylvania Turnpike (exit 31). It is centered on the intersection of Route 63 (Main St), and Route 113 (Harleysville Pike).

== Geography ==
The township has a total area of 14.5 square miles (37.5 km^{2}), of which 14.4 square miles (37.3 km^{2}) is land and 0.1 square mile (0.2 km^{2}) (0.41%) is water. The East Branch Perkiomen Creek and Skippack Creek are tributaries of the Perkiomen Creek draining the township.

== History ==
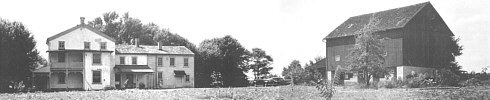
Jacob Reiff's farm

=== Founding ===
Lower Salford was originally part of the larger Salford Township, until, in March 1741 Jacob Reiff petitioned the Court of Quarter Sessions of Philadelphia County to split the Township into what are now called Lower Salford, Upper Salford, Marlborough, and Franconia Townships. Lower Salford contains the villages of Harleysville, Lederach, Mainland, and Vernfield.

The area around Lower Salford was originally settled in the early 1700s by farmers from Germany, Switzerland, and Holland. Because of this, most people at the time spoke primarily Pennsylvania Dutch, until the mid 1900s.

=== Heckler Plains ===
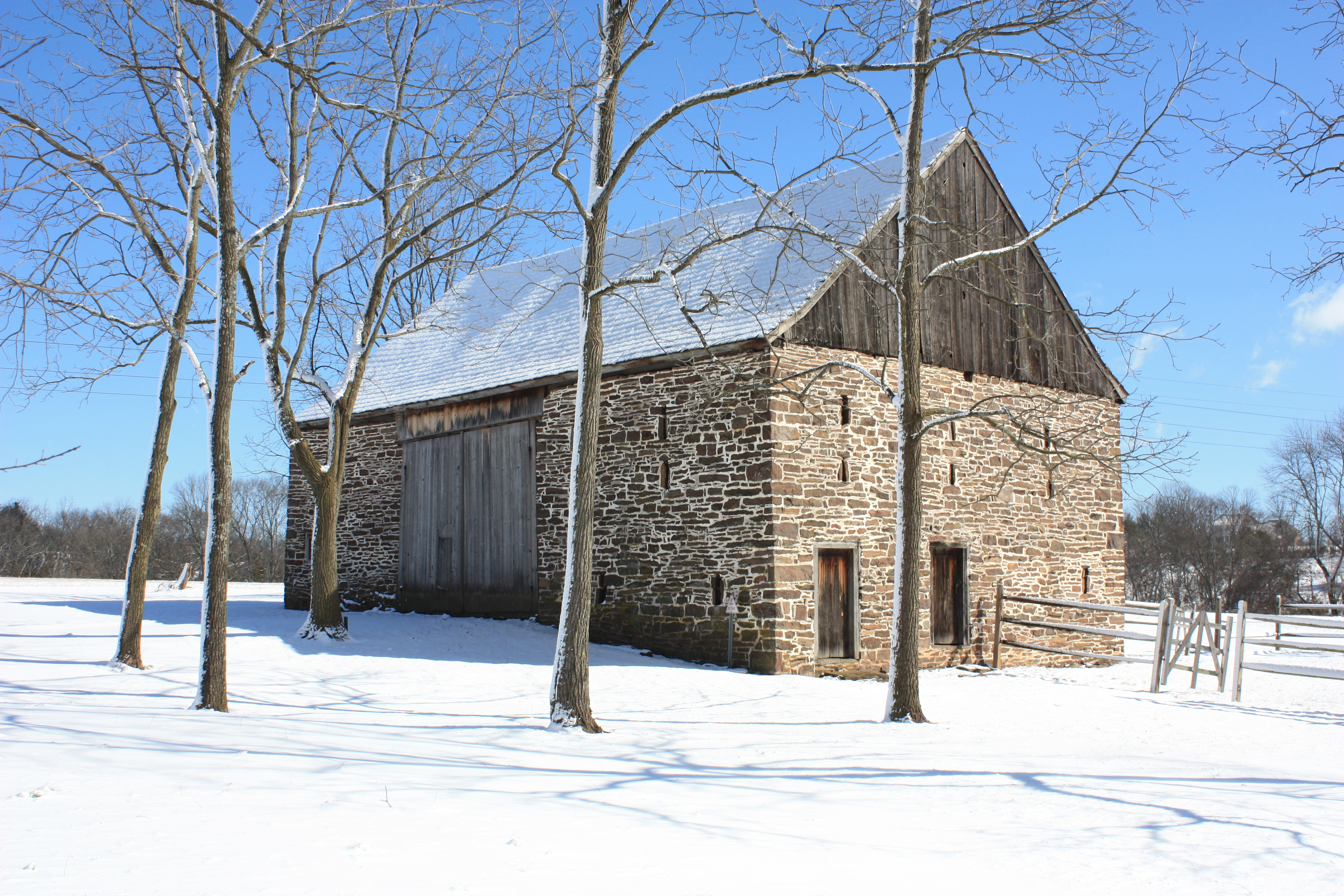
Barn at Heckler Farmstead

Heckler Plains is a 36-acre farmstead, now park. It was once home to Major General Winfield Scott Hancock, a General at the Battle of Gettysburg. There still stands a barn from 1761, an 18th-century kitchen garden, and an outdoor bake oven from 1780. Hecklerfest is held annually and has soap making, butter churning, candle dipping, and other Colonial Era demonstrations.

=== Dielman Kolb Homestead ===
The Dielman Kolb Homestead is a historic home located near Lederach. The house was built in 1717, and is a 2 1/2-story, gambrel-roofed dwelling with a modified Germanic floor plan. It has an attached summer kitchen.

== Entertainment and recreation ==
The Lederach Golf Club is a public, 18 hole golf course opened in 2006. It is owned by the township of Lower Salford. It has a par 71 layout with five sets of tees from 7,000 yards to 2,800 yards.

Lower Salford has 12 parks as part of the federal, state and county sponsored "Open Space/Green Belt" program.

== Arts ==
The township flag and logo were designed by John H. Drenning, president of the Heckler Plains Folklife Society, in 1991. The center of the logo depicts a Pennsylvania Dutch couple in front of a wheat field. Above the depiction is the word “gemeinschaft,” which is German for “a sense of community." The background of the flag has three wavy stripes; brown for the fertile soil, green for the abundant grass and other plants, and gold for the bountiful crops and warm sunshine. On the sides of the flag are two cedar trees representing the much praised wood. The top of the flag has LOWER SALFORD on a field of blue sky with four stars to represent the four villages that make up the township.

Lower Salford is home to The Mennonite Heritage Center. A museum and historical library dedicated to preserving and sharing the stories of Mennonite faith and life in eastern Pennsylvania. Which holds an annual Apple Butter Frolic, an autumn festival featuring Pennsylvania Dutch foods, crafts, and farming demonstrations.

Lower Salford is home to a large-scale exterior mural designed by Dana McMullin, residing on the side of Rann Pharmacy. McMullin executed the public work with a small team in 2006 from its concept to production, portraying a visually nostalgic history of Harleysville from settlement to modern day.

== Government ==
Presidential elections results
Year	Republican	Democratic
2020	47.1% 4,765	51.1% 5,171
2016	49.3% 4,208	45.6% 3,888
2012	55.5% 4,388	43.2% 3,416
2008	51.4% 4,048	47.6% 3,750
2004	58.5% 4,138	41.0% 2,895
2000	60.0% 3,276	36.2% 1,946

=== Board of Supervisors ===
Lower Salford Township is a Township of the Second Class governed by a five-member Board of Supervisors elected at-large for a six year term.

=== Montgomery County Commissioners ===
Jamila H. Winder, Neil K. Makhija, Thomas DiBello

=== Representative in the Pennsylvania General Assembly ===
Representative Donna Scheuren, 147th District

=== Senator in the Pennsylvania General Assembly ===
Senator Tracy Pennycuick, 24th District

=== Representative in the United States Congress ===
Representative Madeleine Dean, 4th District

== Demographics ==
Historical population
Census	Pop.	Note	%±
1930	1,941		—
1940	2,075		6.9%
1950	2,290		10.4%
1960	3,389		48.0%
1970	5,008		47.8%
1980	6,156		22.9%
1990	10,735		74.4%
2000	12,893		20.1%
2010	14,959		16.0%
2020	15,896		6.3%

As of the 2010 census, the township was 90.6% White, 2.9% Black or African American, 0.1% Native American, 4.4% Asian, and 1.3% were two or more races. 2.6% of the population were of Hispanic or Latino ancestry.

As of the census of 2000, there were 12,893 people, 4,432 households, and 3,541 families residing in the township. The population density was 894.0 inhabitants per square mile (345.2/km^{2}). There were 4,531 housing units at an average density of 314.2 per square mile (121.3/km^{2}). The racial makeup of the township was 93.42% White, 2.94% African American, 0.05% Native American, 2.34% Asian, 0.05% Pacific Islander, 0.31% from other races, and 0.89% from two or more races. Hispanic or Latino of any race were 1.42% of the population.

There were 4,432 households, out of which 45.1% had children under the age of 18 living with them, 70.0% were married couples living together, 7.7% had a female householder with no husband present, and 20.1% were non-families. 16.1% of all households were made up of individuals, and 4.4% had someone living alone who was 65 years of age or older. The average household size was 2.89 and the average family size was 3.27.

In the township the population was spread out, with 31.0% under the age of 18, 5.7% from 18 to 24, 34.3% from 25 to 44, 21.6% from 45 to 64, and 7.4% who were 65 years of age or older. The median age was 35 years. For every 100 females, there were 96.3 males. For every 100 females age 18 and over, there were 93.1 males.

The median income for a household in the township was $70,977, and the median income for a family was $78,473. Males had a median income of $51,837 versus $34,066 for females. The per capita income for the township was $28,408. About 2.0% of families and 3.4% of the population were below the poverty line, including 3.8% of those under age 18 and 5.9% of those age 65 or over.

== Transportation ==
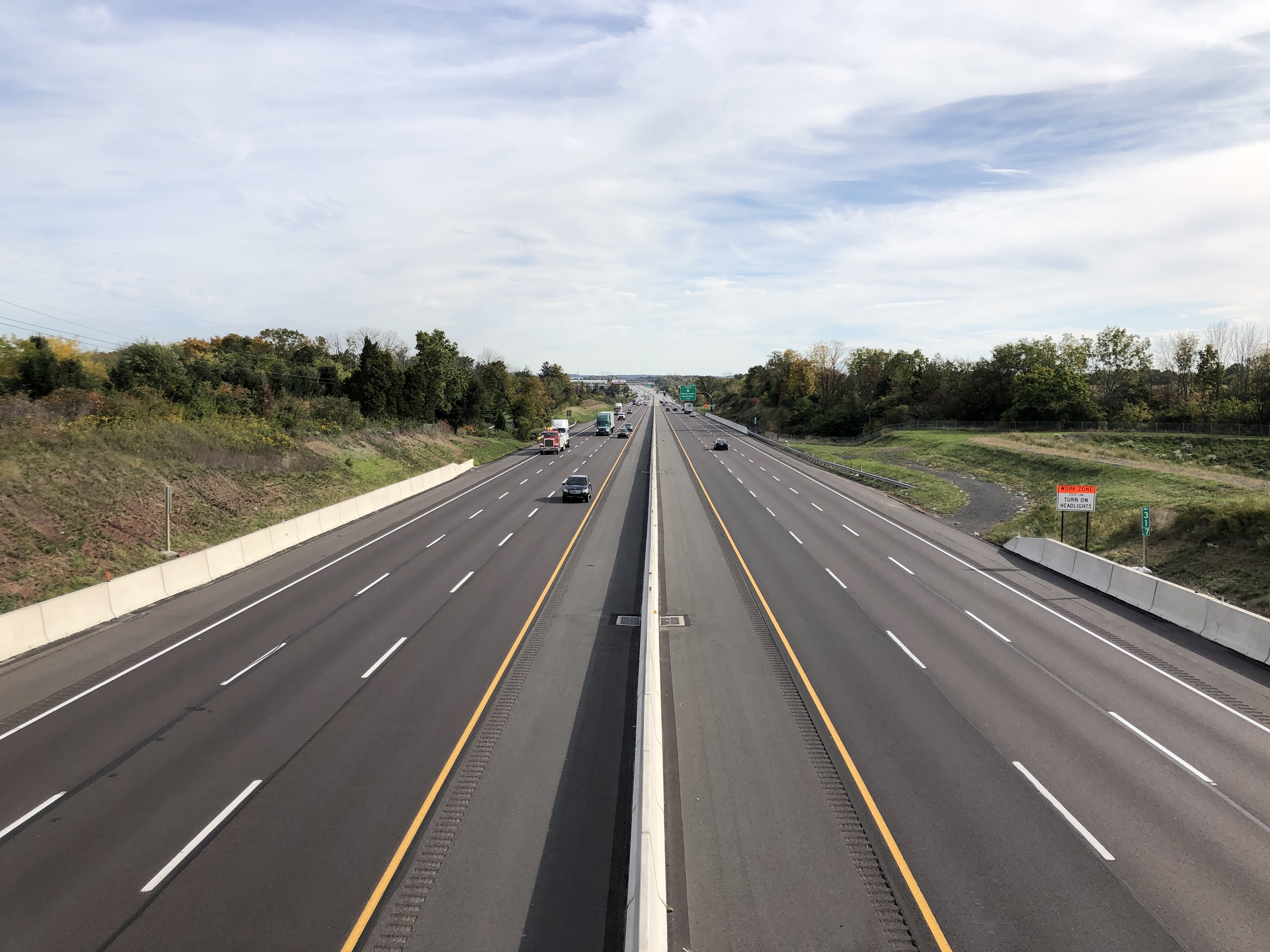
The Pennsylvania Turnpike Northeast Extension (I-476) southbound in Lower Salford Township

As of 2019, there were 100.16 miles (161.19 km) of public roads in Lower Salford Township, of which 1.30 miles (2.09 km) were maintained by the Pennsylvania Turnpike Commission (PTC), 18.71 miles (30.11 km) were maintained by the Pennsylvania Department of Transportation (PennDOT) and 80.15 miles (128.99 km) were maintained by the township.

The most prominent highway traversing Lower Salford Township is Interstate 476, which follows the Pennsylvania Turnpike Northeast Extension along a northwest-southeast alignment through the eastern corner of the township. However, the nearest interchange is in adjacent Towamencin Township. Local highways providing direct access to the township include Pennsylvania Route 63, which follows a northwest-southeast alignment across the northeastern portion of the township, and Pennsylvania Route 113, which follows a northeast-southwest alignment across the northwestern portion of the township.

== Schools ==
Lower Salford is part of the Souderton Area School District. The following public schools can be found in the town:

- Oak Ridge Elementary School
- Vernfield Elementary School
- Indian Valley Middle School

== Notable people ==
- Drew Lewis - late United States Secretary of Transportation under Ronald Reagan, chairman and CEO of Union Pacific, and president of Warner-Amex
- Preston Elliot - host of Preston and Steve radio show
- Danielle and Jennifer Brown - singer-songwriters
- Jesse Francis McClendon - chemist, zoologist, physiologist
- Bruce Castor - Solicitor General of Pennsylvania; Montgomery County district attorney and commissioner
