= Jenny Brown =

Jenny Brown may refer to:

- Jenny Brown (feminist), American author and radical feminist
- Jenny Brown (Phineas and Ferb), a recurring character in the TV series
- Jenny Brown Associates, a Scottish literary agency
- Jenny Gilbertson (1902–1990), Scottish film-maker, born Jenny Brown
- the unknown person named in Jenny Brown's Point, a headland in Silverdale, Lancashire, England

== See also ==
- Jennifer Brown (disambiguation)
