= Pennsylvania Route 112 =

Highway in Pennsylvania, United States

Pennsylvania Route 112

Route information
- Maintained by Pennsylvania Department of Highways
- Length: 4.748 mi (7.641 km)
- Existed: 1928–1946

Major junctions
- South end: US 322 in Markham
- US 1 in Markham
- North end: PA 926 in Tanguy

Location
- Country: United States
- State: Pennsylvania
- Counties: Delaware, Chester

Highway system
- Pennsylvania State Route System; Interstate; US; State; Scenic; Legislative
← US 111	→ PA 113

Pennsylvania Route 112 (PA 112) was a 4 3/4-mile-long (7.6 km) state highway located in Delaware and Chester counties in Pennsylvania. Running along current day Cheyney Road, PA 112 began at an intersection with U.S. Route 1 (US 1) in Markham, headed northward, and terminated at an intersection with PA 926 in the community of Tanguy.

PA 112 was assigned in the commonwealth's numbering of state highways in 1928. The route remained intact for thirteen years, when, in 1941, the highway was extended southward to US 322 south of Markham. The route remained for another five years, when the route was removed from the state highway system completely. The road south of Creek Road in Chester County is still state-maintained as SR 4015.

== Route description ==
Pennsylvania Route 112 began at an intersection with US 322 (now an intersection with Concord Road) in the community of Markham. The route progressed northward as Cheyney Road, intersecting with several local roads before passing the Newlin Grist Mill Park near the intersection with US 1 (the Baltimore Pike). After that intersection, PA 112 turned to the northeast, passing through Markham before leaving the community.

PA 112 went through the community of Thornton, intersecting with Glen Mills Road. At an intersection with Thornton Road, the route crossed into Chester County, but left quickly for Delaware County again. North of the community of Cheyney, Route 112 crossed the county line, passing the Cheyney University of Pennsylvania before the terminus at an intersection with Pennsylvania Route 926 in the Chester County community of Tanguy.

== History ==
Route 112 was first assigned in the 1928 state numbering of state highways in Pennsylvania. The route, when originally assigned, did start in Markham, but at an intersection with U.S. Route 1. The route's northern terminus remained the same in the route's entire lifetime. In 1941, the southern terminus was adjusted from the intersection with U.S. Route 1 (the Baltimore Pike) to an intersection with U.S. Route 322 near Markham. Although they made the adjustment, PA 112 ended up becoming one of the many routes decommissioned in 1946, when the commonwealth of Pennsylvania removed several hundred miles from their system. The designation has not been re-used since the 1946 removal.

== Major intersections ==
County	Location	mi	km	Destinations	Notes
Delaware	Markham	0.000	0.000	US 322	Southern terminus of PA 112, now an intersection with Concord Road
Delaware	Markham	0.949	1.527	US 1 (Baltimore Pike) – Concordville, Chester Heights	Former southern terminus of PA 112
Chester	Tanguy	4.748	7.641	PA 926 (East Street Road)	Northern terminus of PA 112
1.000 mi = 1.609 km; 1.000 km = 0.621 mi

== See also ==
- Pennsylvania Route 12 (1920s)
