= Silverdale, Pennsylvania =

Borough in Pennsylvania, US

- Borough
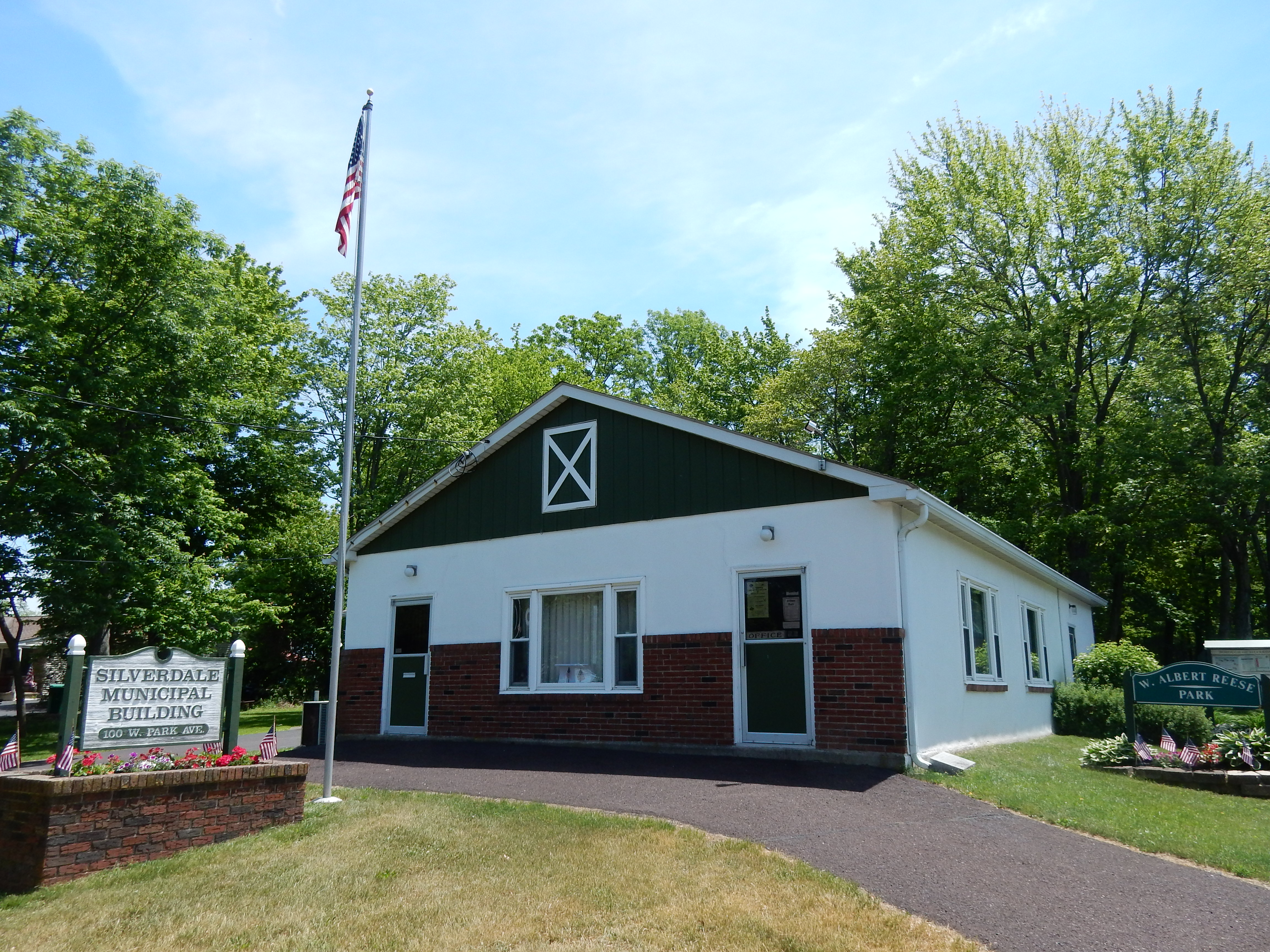
- Silverdale Municipal Building

- Location in Bucks County, Pennsylvania.

- Location in Pennsylvania Location in the United States
- Coordinates: 40°20′47″N 75°16′15″W
- Country: United States
- State: Pennsylvania
- County: Bucks

Area
  - Total: 0.41 sq mi (1.07 km^{2})
  - Land: 0.41 sq mi (1.07 km^{2})
  - Water: 0 sq mi (0.00 km^{2})
- Elevation: 443 ft (135 m)

Population (2010)
  - Total: 4,249
  - Estimate (2019): 854
  - Density: 2,065.7/sq mi (797.56/km^{2})
- Time zone: UTC-5 (Eastern (EST))
  - Summer (DST): UTC-4 (EDT)
- Zip Code: 18962
- Area codes: 215, 267 and 445
- FIPS code: 42-70744
- Website: www.silverdalepa.org

Silverdale is a borough in Bucks County, Pennsylvania, United States. As of the 2020 census, Silverdale had a population of 805.

== Education ==
Silverdale is part of Pennridge School District.

== Geography ==
Silverdale is located at 40°20′47″N 75°16′15″W (40.346459, -75.270955).

According to the United States Census Bureau, the borough has a total area of 0.4 square miles (1.0 km^{2}), all land.

== Demographics ==
Historical population
Census	Pop.	Note	%±
2000	1,001		—
2010	871		−13.0%
2020	805		−7.6%

As of the 2010 census, the borough was 97.2% White, 0.8% Black or African American, 0.2% Native American, 0.1% Asian, and 0.3% were two or more races. 1.4% of the population were of Hispanic or Latino ancestry.

As of the census of 2000, there were 1,001 people, 323 households, and 264 families residing in the borough. The population density was 2,220.0 inhabitants per square mile (857.1/km^{2}). There were 329 housing units at an average density of 729.7 per square mile (281.7/km^{2}). The racial makeup of the borough was 99.00% White, 0.20% African American, 0.10% Native American, 0.10% Asian, 0.30% from other races, and 0.30% from two or more races. Hispanic or Latino of any race were 0.80% of the population.

There were 323 households, out of which 48.9% had children under the age of 18 living with them, 73.4% were married couples living together, 5.9% had a female householder with no husband present, and 18.0% were non-families. 13.0% of all households were made up of individuals, and 4.3% had someone living alone who was 65 years of age or older. The average household size was 3.08 and the average family size was 3.45.

In the borough the population was spread out, with 32.5% under the age of 18, 6.5% from 18 to 24, 35.3% from 25 to 44, 19.6% from 45 to 64, and 6.2% who were 65 years of age or older. The median age was 34 years. For every 100 females there were 111.6 males. For every 100 females age 18 and over, there were 103.0 males.

The median income for a household in the borough was $62,250, and the median income for a family was $68,594. Males had a median income of $42,431 versus $29,500 for females. The per capita income for the borough was $23,814. About 2.6% of families and 2.1% of the population were below the poverty line, including 1.3% of those under age 18 and 14.8% of those age 65 or over.

== Climate ==
According to the Köppen climate classification system, Silverdale has a Hot-summer, Humid continental climate (Dfa). Dfa climates are characterized by at least one month having an average mean temperature ≤ 32.0 °F (0.0 °C), at least four months with an average mean temperature ≥ 50.0 °F (10.0 °C), at least one month with an average mean temperature ≥ 71.6 °F (22.0 °C) and no significant precipitation difference between seasons. Although most summer days are slightly humid in Silverdale, episodes of heat and high humidity can occur with heat index values > 105 °F (41 °C). Since 1981, the highest air temperature was 101.5 °F (38.6 °C) on July 22, 2011, and the highest daily average mean dew point was 74.2 °F (23.4 °C) on August 12, 2016. The average wettest month is July, which corresponds with the annual peak in thunderstorm activity. Since 1981, the wettest calendar day was 6.72 inches (171 mm) on August 27, 2011. During the winter months, the average annual extreme minimum air temperature is −1.9 °F (−18.8 °C). Since 1981, the coldest air temperature was −13.0 °F (−25.0 °C) on January 21, 1984. Episodes of extreme cold and wind can occur, with wind chill values < −13 °F (−25 °C). The average annual snowfall (Nov-Apr) is between 30 inches (76 cm) and 36 inches (91 cm). Ice storms and large snowstorms depositing ≥ 12 inches (30 cm) of snow occur once every few years, particularly during nor’easters from December through February.

Climate data for Silverdale, Elevation 430 ft (131 m), 1981-2010 normals, extremes 1981-2018
Month	Jan	Feb	Mar	Apr	May	Jun	Jul	Aug	Sep	Oct	Nov	Dec	Year
Record high °F (°C)	70.2 (21.2)	77.6 (25.3)	85.8 (29.9)	92.8 (33.8)	94.0 (34.4)	94.9 (34.9)	101.5 (38.6)	99.0 (37.2)	96.6 (35.9)	88.2 (31.2)	80.0 (26.7)	74.7 (23.7)	101.5 (38.6)
Mean daily maximum °F (°C)	38.3 (3.5)	41.6 (5.3)	50.0 (10.0)	62.2 (16.8)	72.2 (22.3)	80.8 (27.1)	84.8 (29.3)	83.2 (28.4)	76.4 (24.7)	64.9 (18.3)	53.8 (12.1)	42.4 (5.8)	62.6 (17.0)
Daily mean °F (°C)	29.6 (−1.3)	32.3 (0.2)	39.9 (4.4)	50.9 (10.5)	60.6 (15.9)	69.7 (20.9)	74.1 (23.4)	72.6 (22.6)	65.2 (18.4)	53.5 (11.9)	43.8 (6.6)	34.0 (1.1)	52.3 (11.3)
Mean daily minimum °F (°C)	20.9 (−6.2)	23.1 (−4.9)	29.9 (−1.2)	39.5 (4.2)	49.0 (9.4)	58.5 (14.7)	63.4 (17.4)	61.9 (16.6)	54.0 (12.2)	42.2 (5.7)	33.8 (1.0)	25.5 (−3.6)	41.9 (5.5)
Record low °F (°C)	−13.0 (−25.0)	−5.4 (−20.8)	2.1 (−16.6)	16.1 (−8.8)	30.2 (−1.0)	39.9 (4.4)	46.5 (8.1)	41.1 (5.1)	34.0 (1.1)	22.7 (−5.2)	10.1 (−12.2)	−3.1 (−19.5)	−13.0 (−25.0)
Average precipitation inches (mm)	3.42 (87)	2.82 (72)	3.88 (99)	4.07 (103)	4.35 (110)	4.38 (111)	4.79 (122)	3.93 (100)	4.55 (116)	4.28 (109)	3.73 (95)	3.96 (101)	48.16 (1,223)
Average relative humidity (%)	67.9	64.6	60.4	58.8	63.4	69.1	69.0	71.4	72.4	71.5	70.1	69.9	67.4
Average dew point °F (°C)	20.3 (−6.5)	21.7 (−5.7)	27.3 (−2.6)	37.0 (2.8)	48.1 (8.9)	59.1 (15.1)	63.3 (17.4)	62.8 (17.1)	56.1 (13.4)	44.5 (6.9)	34.7 (1.5)	25.2 (−3.8)	41.8 (5.4)
Source: PRISM

== Transportation ==
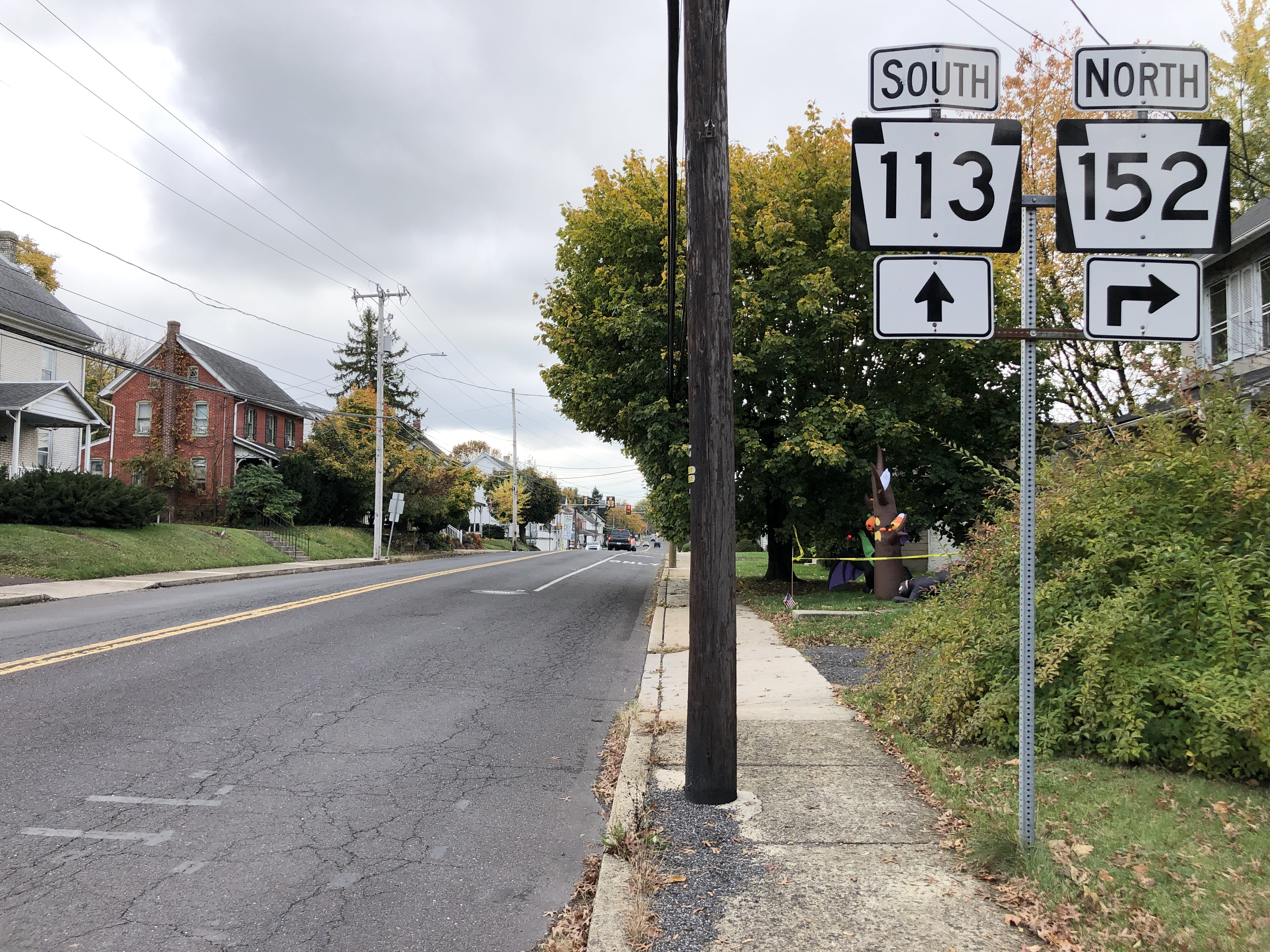
PA 113 southbound and PA 152 northbound in Silverdale

As of 2006 there were 4.51 miles (7.26 km) of public roads in Silverdale, of which 2.20 miles (3.54 km) were maintained by the Pennsylvania Department of Transportation (PennDOT) and 2.31 miles (3.72 km) were maintained by the borough.

Pennsylvania Route 113 and Pennsylvania Route 152 are the numbered highways serving Silverdale. PA 113 traverses the borough on a northeast-southwest alignment via Main Street. PA 152 follows a southeast-northwest alignment through the borough via Baringer Avenue, Main Street and Walnut Street, briefly becoming concurrent with PA 113.

== Ecology ==
According to the A. W. Kuchler U.S. potential natural vegetation types, Silverdale would have a dominant vegetation type of Appalachian Oak (104) with a dominant vegetation form of Eastern Hardwood Forest (25). The plant hardiness zone is 6b with an average annual extreme minimum air temperature of −1.9 °F (−18.8 °C). The spring bloom typically begins by April 13 and fall color usually peaks by October 27.

== Gallery ==
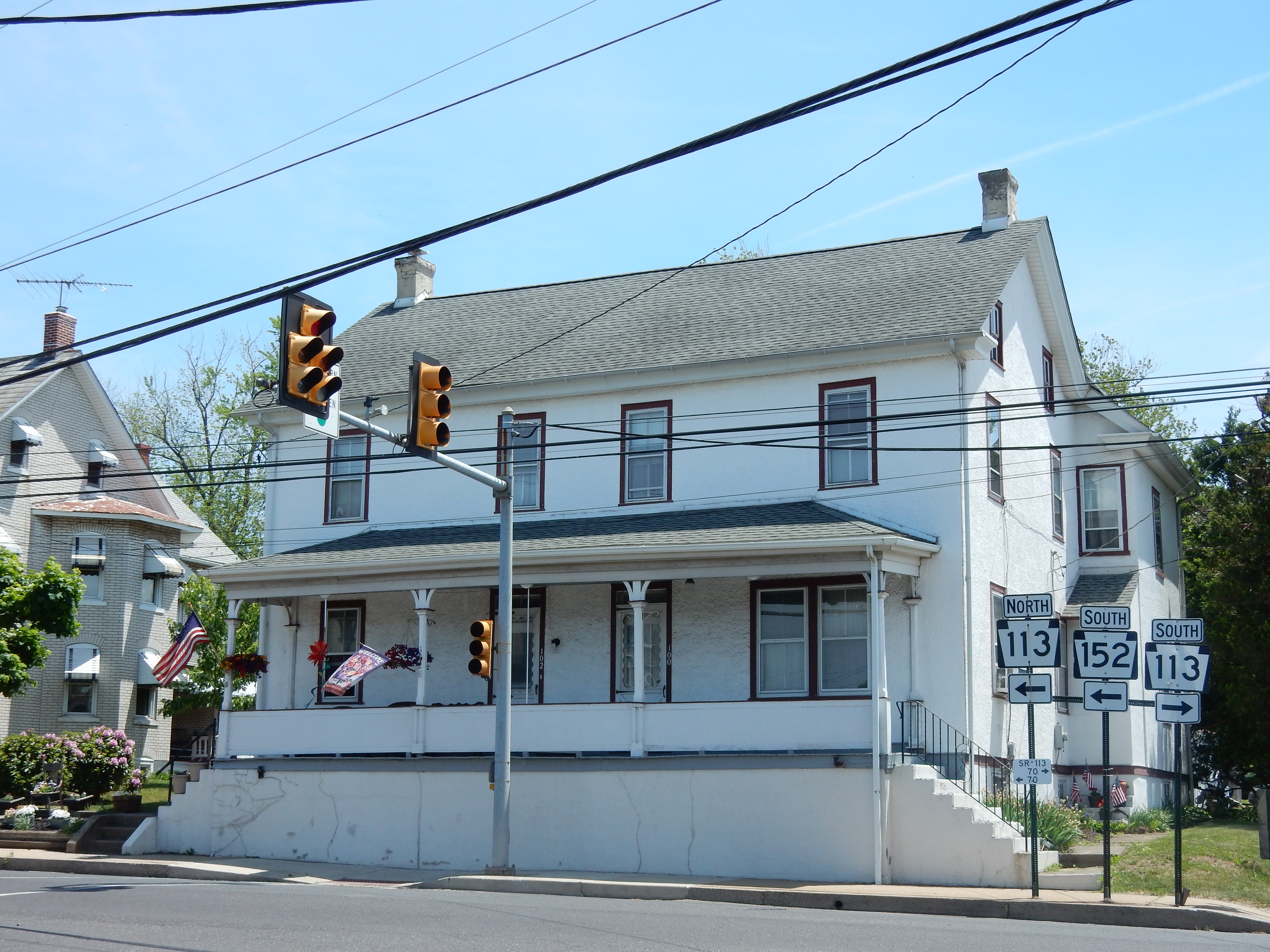
Main St. (Route 113).

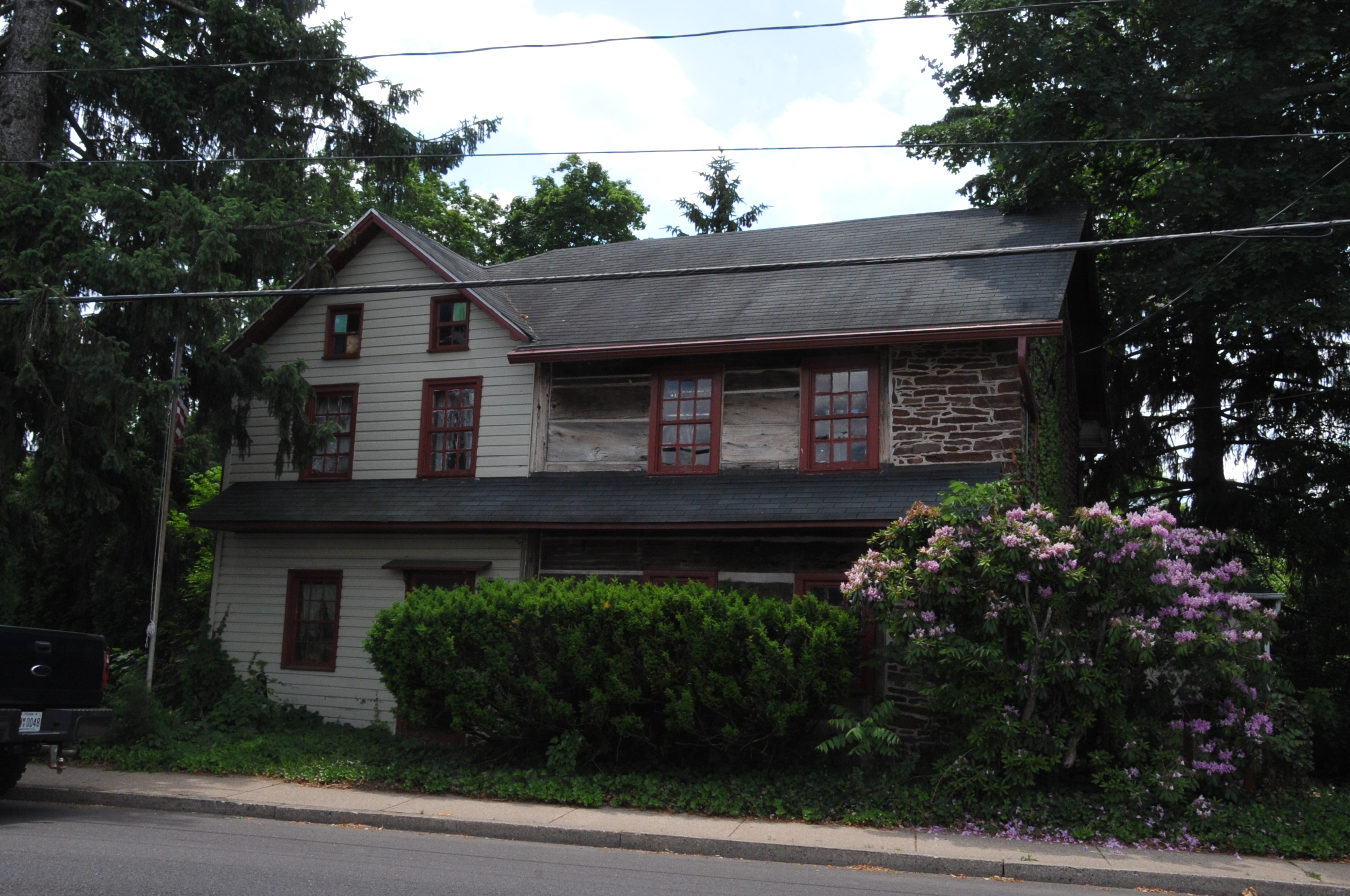
Historic home. Was the post office.

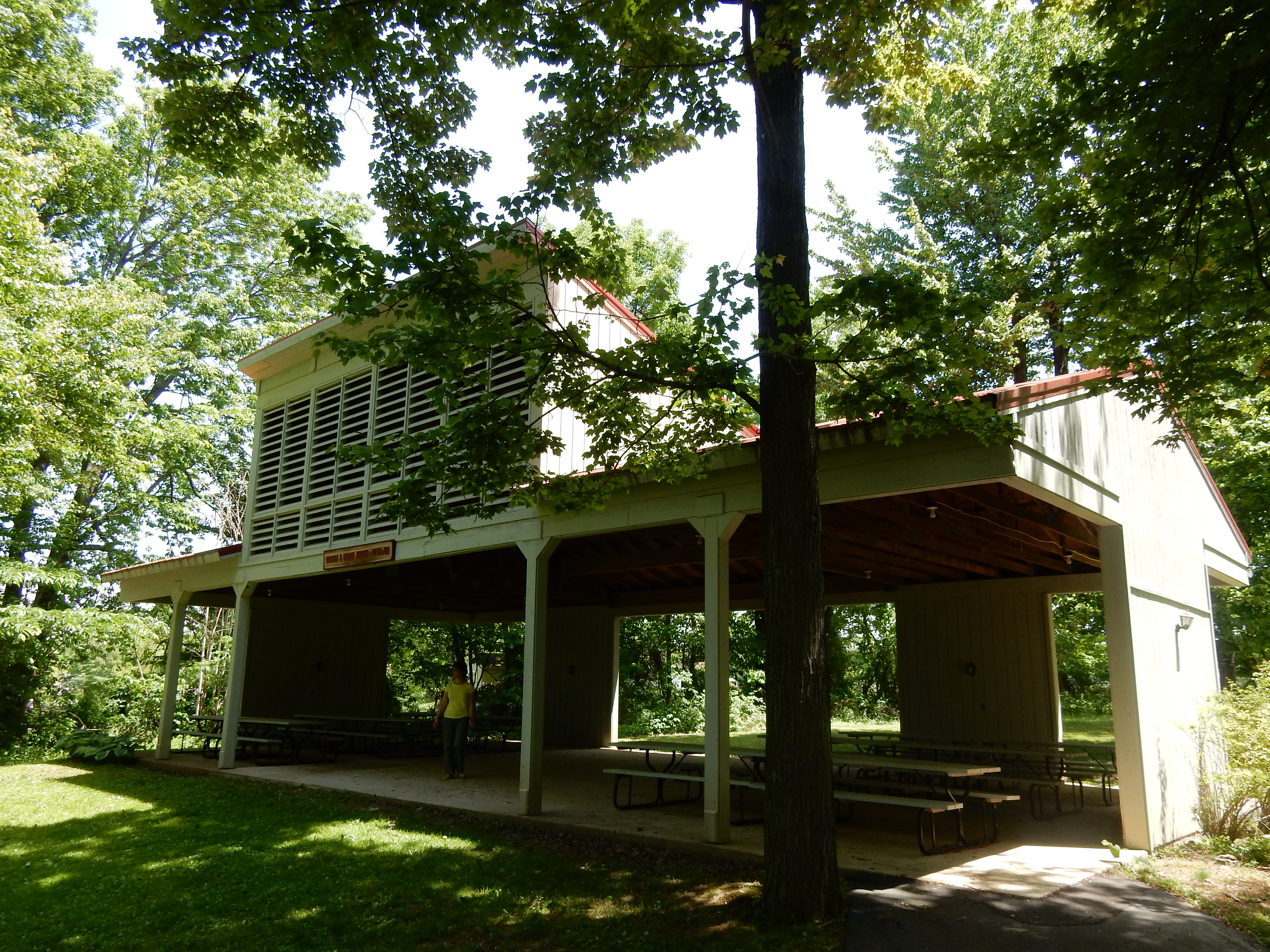
W. Albert Reese Park in Silverdale.
