= Rahns, Pennsylvania =

Unincorporated community in Pennsylvania, US

- Unincorporated community
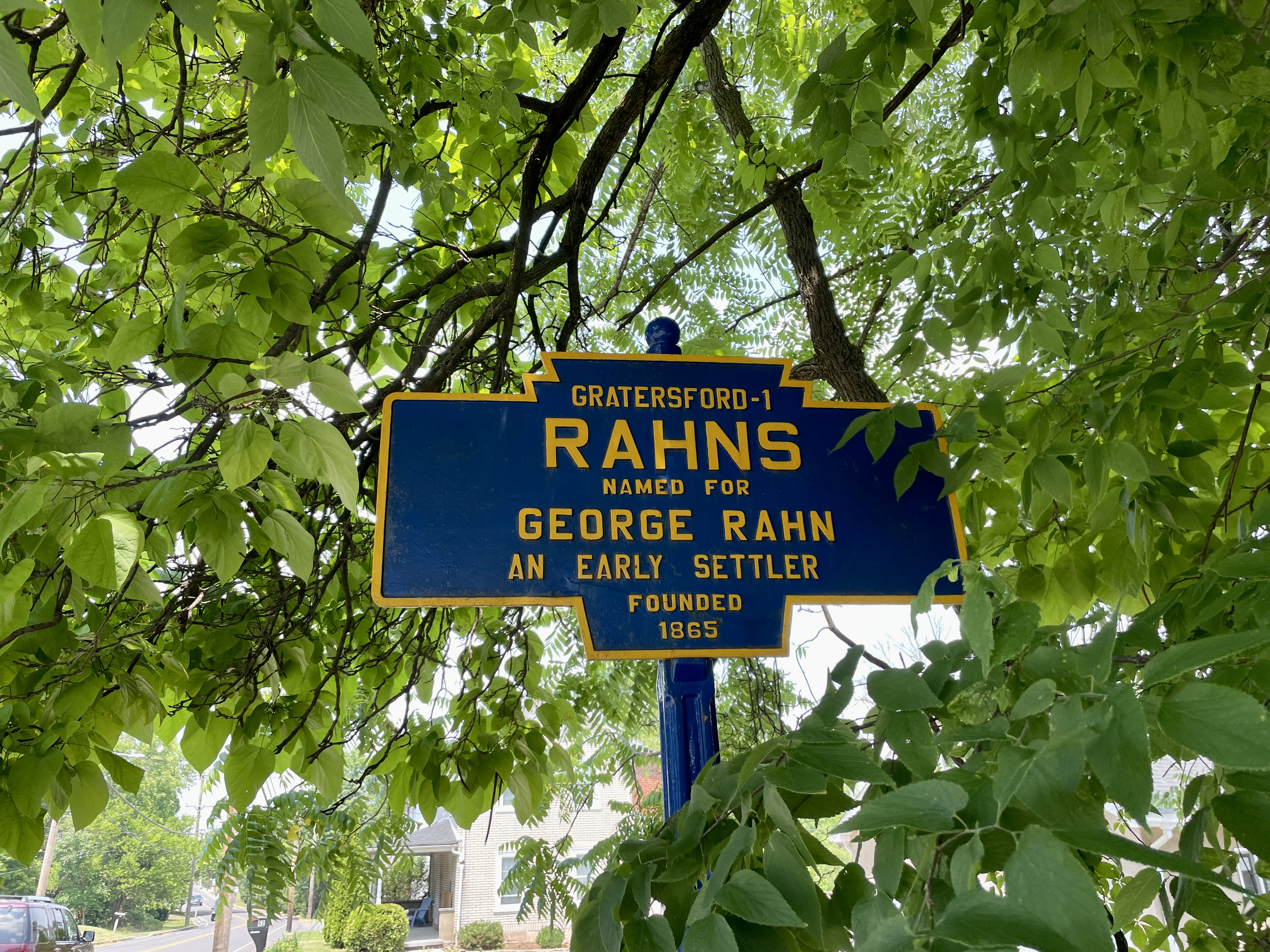
- Keystone marker for Rahns

- Location within Pennsylvania
- Coordinates: 40°12′33″N 75°27′11″W
- Country: United States
- State: Pennsylvania
- County: Montgomery
- Township: Perkiomen
- Elevation: 135 ft (41 m)
- Time zone: UTC-5 (Eastern (EST))
  - Summer (DST): UTC-4 (EDT)
- ZIP Code: 19426
- Area codes: 610 and 484
- GNIS feature ID: 1184598

Rahns is an unincorporated community along the Perkiomen Creek in Perkiomen Township, Montgomery County, Pennsylvania. Rahns was founded in 1865 and named for an early settler, George Rahn.
