= Jennifer Brown (statistician) =

New Zealand statistician

Jennifer Ann Brown
- Education: University of Canterbury; University of Otago
- Awards: Campbell Award of the New Zealand Statistical Association, 2017
- Scientific career
- Fields: Statistics
- Workplaces: University of Canterbury

Jennifer Ann Brown is a New Zealand statistician, currently a professor at the University of Canterbury and the former president of the New Zealand Statistical Association.

Brown is interested in problems of environmental statistics such as monitoring endangered or invasive species, and in the statistical problems such as experimental design and change detection needed to accomplish those tasks. She is a Professor of Statistics at the University of Canterbury, head of the School of Mathematics and Statistics at Canterbury, and associate director of the Biomathematics Research Centre.

After studying forestry as an undergraduate at the University of Canterbury, Brown worked in forestry at the New Zealand Forest Research Institute in Rotorua, and then as an ecological and marine manager for the New Zealand Department of Conservation. She writes of this time that "It was only when I was a forester that I realised how important statistics was and started studying it extramurally."

After six years of studying statistics part-time at Massey University while continuing to work in these positions, and earning a postgraduate diploma at Massey, she returned to school full-time for a Ph.D. program in statistics at the University of Otago. Her dissertation, completed in 1996 and supervised by Bryan Manly, was The Efficiency of Adaptive Cluster Sampling.

Brown was the president of the New Zealand Statistical Association for 2008–2011.

She was awarded a lifetime membership in the association in 2014, and the association's Campbell Award in 2017. She is also an elected member of the International Statistical Institute.
