= Danielle and Jennifer =

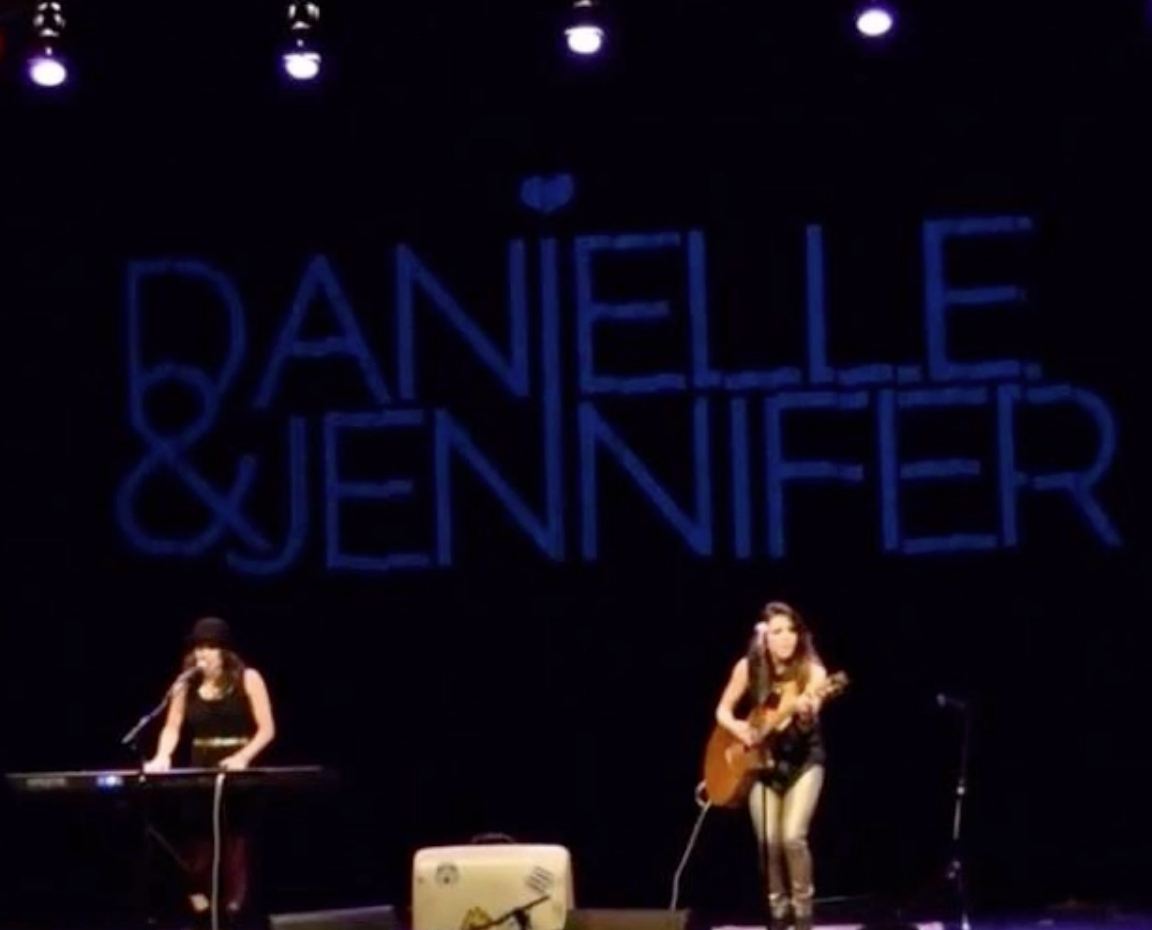
- Danielle and Jennifer performing at The Sellersville Theater

Background information
- Born: Danielle Melanie Brown; Jennifer Michelle Brown; 1991 (age 34–35) Danielle; 1995 (age 30–31) Jennifer
- Origin: Philadelphia, Pennsylvania, United States
- Genres: Soul pop, pop, pop rock
- Occupation: Singer-songwriters
- Instruments: Vocals, guitar, keyboard, cajon ukulele
- Years active: 2008–present
- Members: Danielle Melanie Brown; Jennifer Michelle Brown
- Website: www.danielleandjennifer.com

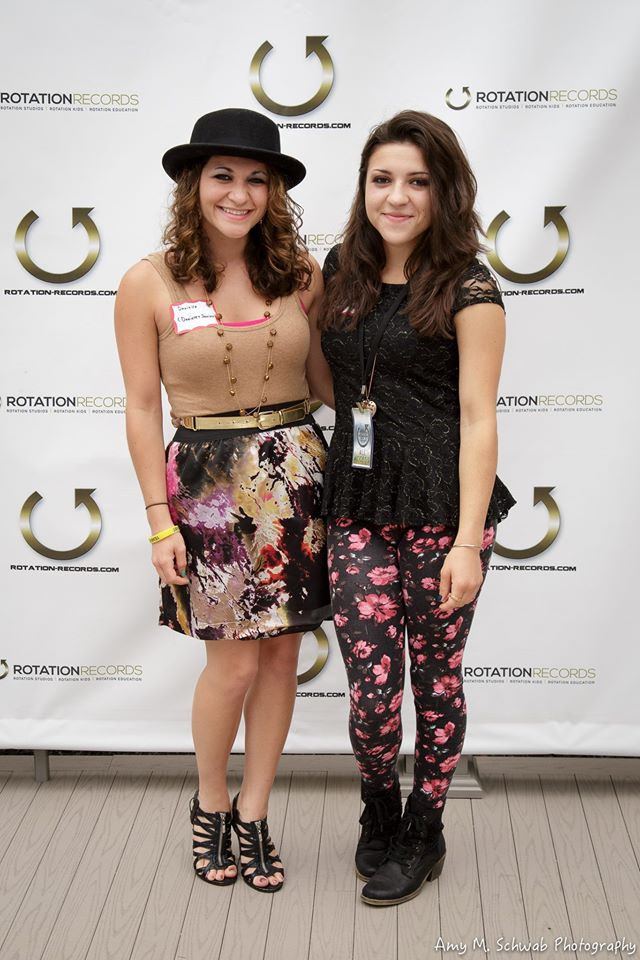
Danielle and Jennifer attending Rotation Records Event

Danielle and Jennifer is an American acting, singer-songwriter sister duo consisting of Danielle Melanie Brown and Jennifer Michelle Brown. Danielle (born 1991) plays keyboard, cajon, ukulele, vocals. Jennifer (born 1995) plays guitar, cajon, ukulele, vocals.

== Early years ==
Danielle and Jennifer grew up Harleysville, Pennsylvania and started out in the entertainment industry at very young ages. Danielle was the first to get the acting bug and Jennifer was soon to follow. Danielle started acting at the age of 5 and landed her first commercial at the age of 6. Danielle's talent was soon recognized and she secured a role on Broadway in Les Misérables at the age of just 7 years old. Danielle is also a member of The Broadway Kids and can be heard on their latest album, Hey Mr. DJ!. Jennifer was of course was not far behind and landed starring roles in Law & Order: SVU, Law & Order: CI and All My Children. Both sisters have a long list of voice-over credentials including voice-over characters in Blue's Clues, and jingles for (Hess Truck (Spanish), Curad, Charmin, Pepsi). They have been seen in TV commercials as well such as Wendy's, Ethan Allen, ASPCA, AT&T, and Monster.com. Danielle has performed in the 2003 Off-Broadway musical The Alchemists. Danielle and Jennifer shared the stage in the Off-Broadway shows "A" for Adultery and The House of Bernarda Alba.

== Music career ==
Danielle and Jennifer formed the music duo "Danielle and Jennifer" in 2008 and performed at festivals and special events. They recorded and released their first single "Radical Love" along with their first official music video on Valentine's Day 2012. They appeared on The Philadelphia NBC 10! Show to promote the release of their single and played their song, "Radical Love" live on The 10! Show stage. Danielle and Jennifer were also chosen to be a Supercuts Rock the cut artist for two years in a row and have their song, "Radical Love" and "The First Time You See Me" played in their stores and available for download on their website. Danielle and Jennifer have opened for national touring acts such as LifeHouse, The Veronicas, Dave Patten, Matt Cermanski, Mycle Wastman, Tyler Bryant, Hydra Melody, and Saving Abel. The sister duo has performed at numerous and historic venues including The Legendary Dobbs in Philadelphia and The Bitter End in New York City. The Sellersville Theater in Sellersville, Pa, Danielle and Jennifer's single and music video to their original song "The First Time You See Me", was co written by Sandy Linzer on Vevo. Danielle and Jennifer have been featured in many online magazines and radio talk shows including, 93.7 Wstw Hometown Heroes with Mark Rogers, Unclaimed Bands, Soundstage Radio with Nicole Zell, Creative Spotlights, Dorks and Forks, Livewire with Lady Spitfire and many more. The duo has been involved and featured in many music festivals such as, The Haverford music festival in Havertown, PA, Liberty Music Festival in Philadelphia, PA, Dewey Beach Music Conference in Dewey Beach, DE. Cape May Singer Songwriter Frozen Harbor music fest in Baltimore, MD Launch Music Conference in Lancaster, PA Millennium Music Conference. Danielle and Jennifer's newest single, "Hello Sunshine" was written about their experiences at RMC (Ronald McDonald Camp). Hello Sunshine won for Track of The Year at the 2016 Elephant Talk Indie awards and took home a Homey award for Best Pop Song at the 2017 93.7 WSTW Homey Awards.

== Discography ==
- "Radical Love" single written by Edward B. Kessel and Marc Hoffman.
- "Radical Love" Music Video Directed by Matthew Bonifacio
- "The First Time You See Me" single written by Edward B. Kessel and Sandy Linzer
- "The First Time You See Me" Music Video by Matthew Bonifacio
- "Not Just Another Christmas CD" Compilation by The Philadelphia Music Scene
- "Hello Sunshine" Single Written by Danielle and Jennifer
- "April Fools" Single Written by Danielle and Jennifer

== Personal life ==
Danielle and Jennifer have Hashimoto's thyroiditis.

== Charity ==
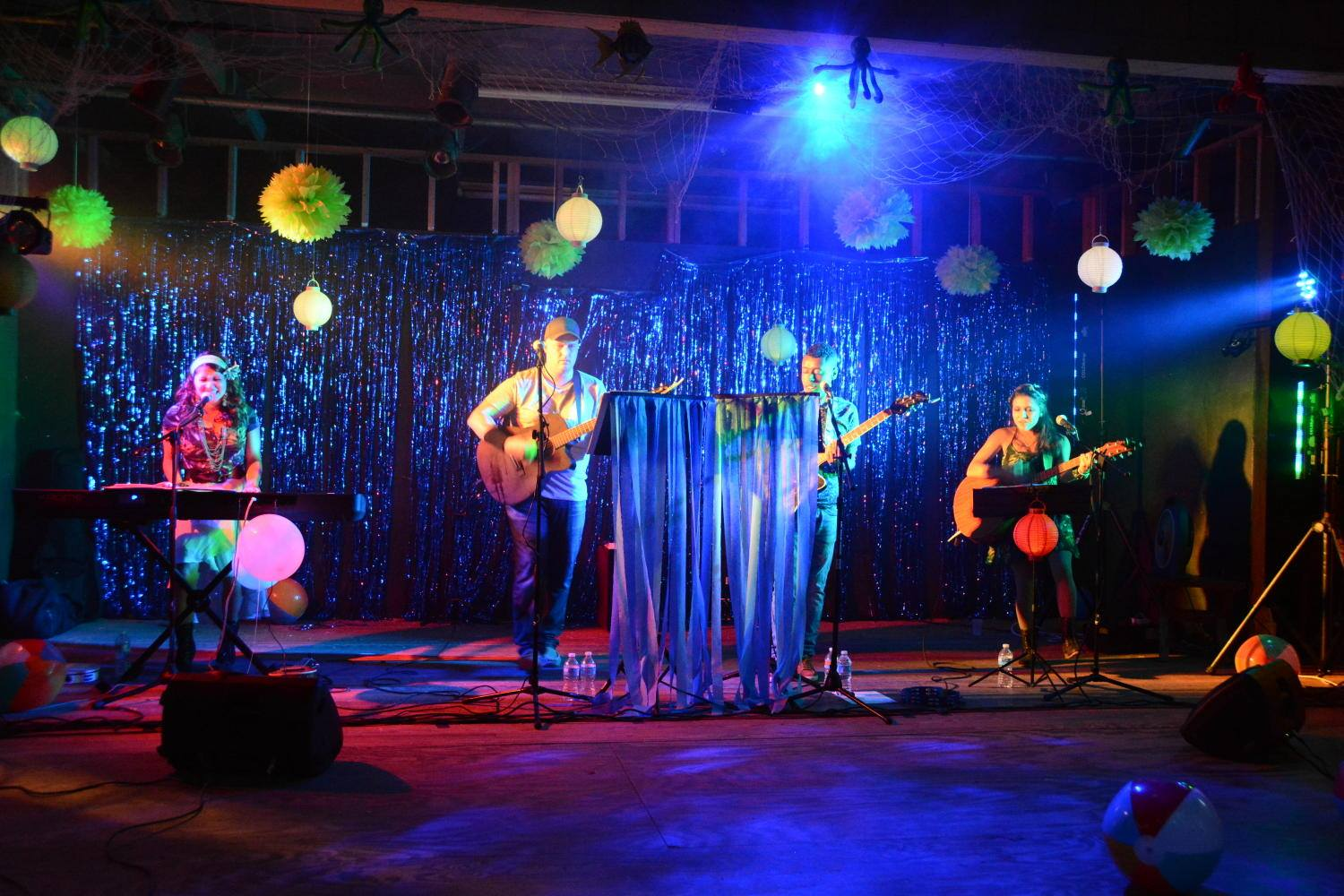
Danielle and Jennifer at RMC

Danielle and Jennifer are big supporters of giving back to the community. They work with Ronald McDonald House Charities and Rotation Records to put on the opening night concert at RMC (Ronald McDonald Camp) for hundreds of children with childhood cancer. Their most recent single, "Hello Sunshine" was written about their experience at RMC and is currently in post production. Danielle and Jennifer have also been a part of other charities and their events including, Elephants For Autism, KIND Hearts, The Happiness Project for Mental Health Awareness, AI DuPont Hospital with The Happiness Project, Rock 4 Paws, BRAINFEST for Brain Tumor Awareness, Gobblejam for Hunger and music education Share The Love Fest.

== Music resume ==
| Year | Project | Type |
|---|---|---|
| 2012 | The NBC 10! Show | TV show |
| 2012 | Miami Or Bust | Film |
| 2012 | "Radical Love" | Music Video |
| 2013 | "The First Time You See Me" | Music Video |

== Appearances ==
| Year | Venue | Date ! |
|---|---|---|
| 2012 | Stonewall Inn – NY, NY | 07/22/12 |
| 2012 | Jebon – NY, NY | 08/31/12 |
| 2012 | The Bitter End – NY, NY | 09/19/12 |
| 2012 | The Legendary Dobbs Philadelphia, PA | 10/11/12 |
| 2012 | The Grape Room – Philadelphia, PA | 11/16/12 |
| 2012 | The Bitter End – NY, NY | 11/19/12 |
| 2013 | The 4th Annual Norristown Arts Festival – Norristown, PA | 05/04/13 |
| 2013 | The Crocodile Rock – Allentown, PA | 05/17/13 |
| 2013 | Make Music NY – Rockaway Beach, NY | 05/21/13 |
| 2013 | The Ella Lounge – NY, NY | 05/25/13 |
| 2013 | The Crocodile Rock Cafe – Allentown, PA | 08/15/13 |
| 2013 | The Liberty Music Fest at The Legendary Dobbs – Philadelphia, PA | 08/18/13 |
| 2013 | End of Summer Bash at The Crocodile Rock Cafe – Allentown, PA | 08/21/13 |
| 2013 | Ludwig's Horse Show – National Anthem and concert – Ludwig's Corner, PA | 09/01/13 |
| 2013 | The Crocodile Rock Cafe opening for Hollywood Ending – Allentown, PA | 09/20/13 |
| 2013 | The Port – Dewey Beach Music Conference – Dewey Beach, DE | 09/21/13 |
| 2014 | World Cafe Live | 02/22/14 |
| | The Trocadero – Philadelphia, PA | 04/25/14 |
| | World Cafe Live at The Queen – DE | 06/06/14 |
| | Chaplins – Spring City, PA | 06/13/14 |
| | Ladybug Music Festival – DE | 07/17/14 |
| | Hard Rock Cafe – Philadelphia, PA | 07/26/14 |
| | HOLLYSTOCK – Mount Holly, NJ | 08/09/14 |
| | Dockside Bar at Dave and Busters – Philadelphia, PA | 08/16/14 |
| | The Grape Room | 09/06/14 |
| | Dewey Beach Music Conference – Mcshea's | 09/19/14 |
| | Dewey Beach Music Conference – Jimmy's Grille | 09/20/14 |
| | Midtown Village Fall Festival – Hard Rock Cafe Stage | 10/06/14 |
| | World Cafe Live at The Queen – RKVC Birthday Show | 10/11/14 |
| | Hebe Music Lounge with Jack and Our Now | 10/24/14 |
| | The Night of the Jack O' Lanterns | 10/25/14 |
| | The Trocadero – Philadelphia PA | 11/04/14 |
| | The Outer Space – Hamden CT | 11/07/14 |
| | The Social Lounge in West Chester, PA | 11/13/14 |
| | Hebe Lounge at Big Shots Bar and Grille | 11/14/14 |
| | Crocodile Rock Cafe – Allentown PA | 12/03/14 |
| | Hard Rock Cafe | 12/23/14 |
| 2015 | | |
