= Cabin Run =

Cabin Run may refer to:

- Cabin Run, Columbia County, Pennsylvania, a stream
- Cabin Run (Tohickon Creek, Delaware River), a stream in Bucks County, Pennsylvania
- Cabin Run Covered Bridge, a covered bridge crossing Cabin Run, Bucks County, Pennsylvania
