= Gardenville, Pennsylvania =

Unincorporated community in the U.S. state of Pennsylvania

- Unincorporated community
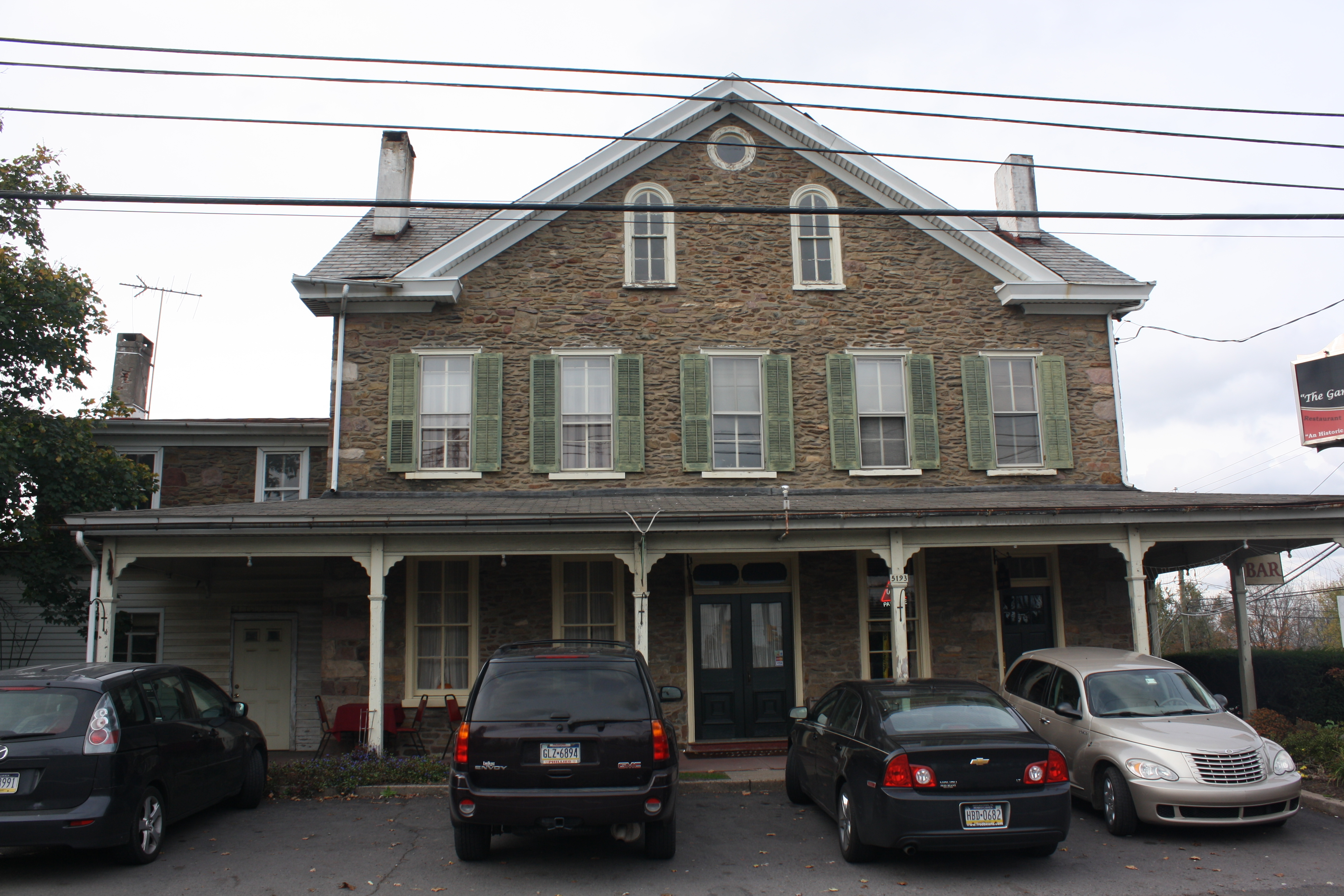
- The Gardenville Hotel, October 2012

- Location within Pennsylvania Location within the United States
- Coordinates: 40°22′21″N 75°6′28″W
- Country: United States
- State: Pennsylvania
- County: Bucks
- Township: Plumstead
- Elevation: 541 ft (165 m)
- Time zone: UTC-5 (Eastern (EST))
  - Summer (DST): UTC-4 (EDT)
- ZIP code: 18926
- Area codes: 215, 267 and 445
- GNIS feature ID: 1175438

Gardenville is an unincorporated community which is located in Plumstead Township in Bucks County, Pennsylvania, United States.

== History ==
The Gardenville–North Branch Rural Historic District was added to the National Register of Historic Places in 1991.

== Geography ==
Gardenville is located at the intersection of Pennsylvania Route 413 and Point Pleasant Pike.

== Notable residents ==
John P. Fullam (1921-2018), United States District Court judge for the Eastern District of Pennsylvania, was born in Gardenville.
