= Doan Outlaws =

British Loyalist gang during the American Revolutionary War

Doan Gang
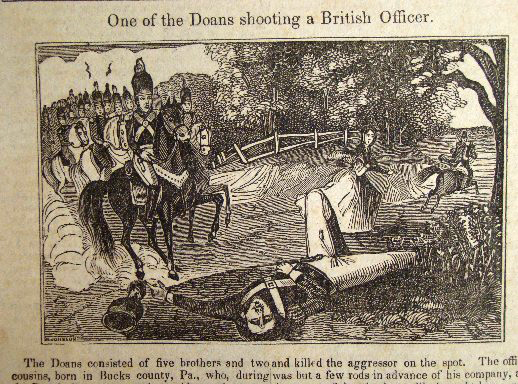
- No known portraits of the Doan brothers from life exist, but only from woodcut images, including this woodcut of Abraham Doan, recorded as "One of the Doans shooting a British officer", from The Pennsylvania New Jersey Delaware Almanac 1849 and also, Annals of the Revolution; or, a History of the Doans.
- Founded by: Moses Doan
- Founding location: Plumstead, Bucks County, Province of Pennsylvania, British North America (present-day Plumstead Township, Pennsylvania, United States)
- Years active: 1774–1783
- Territory: Bucks County, Province of Pennsylvania to Province of New York
- Ethnicity: American
- Membership (est.): 6
- Criminal activities: horse theft, highway robbery, murder

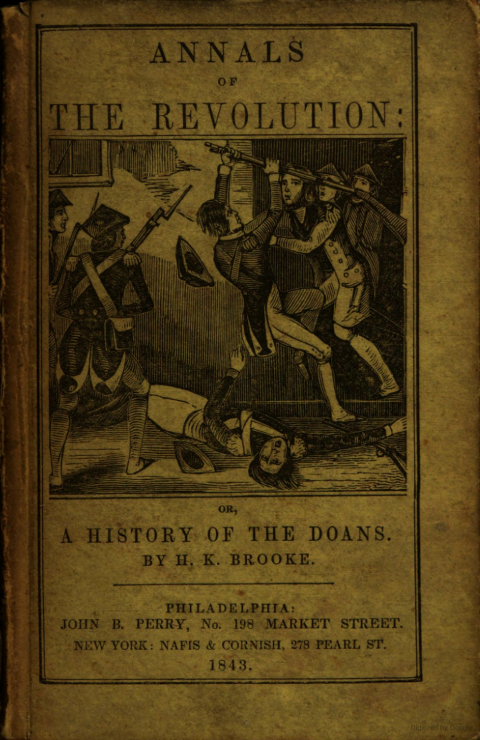
The Annals of the Revolution; or, a History of the Doans was a popular 19th-century account of the Doans Gang that contributed to their folklore in the form of a dime novel.

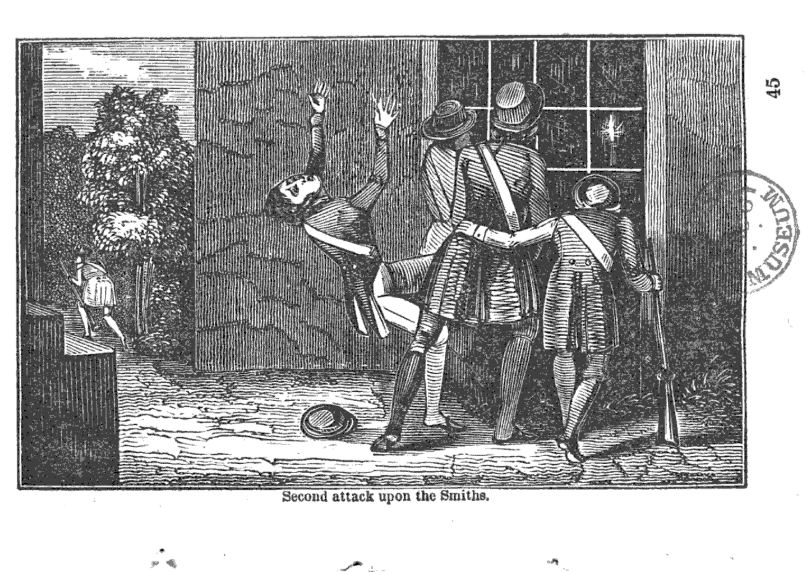
"Second attack upon the Smiths" from Annals of the Revolution; or, a History of the Doans

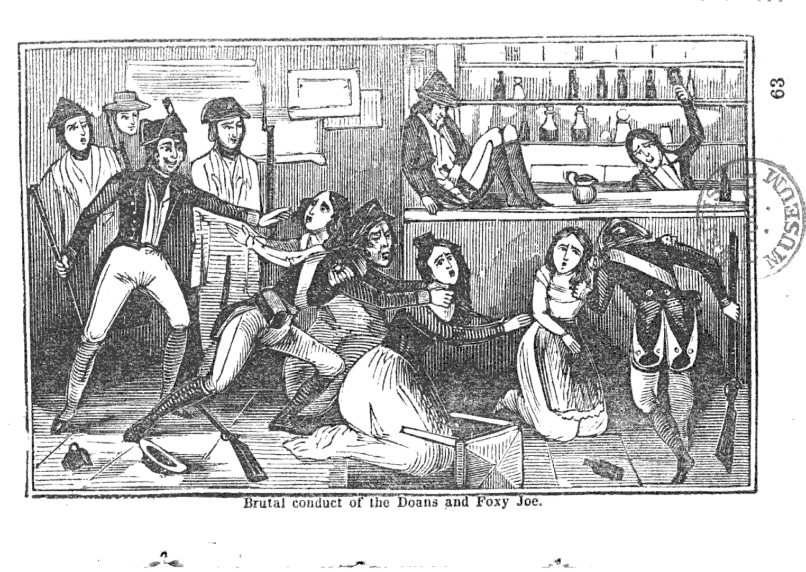
"Brutal conduct of the Doans and Foxy Joe" from Annals of the Revolution; or, a History of the Doans

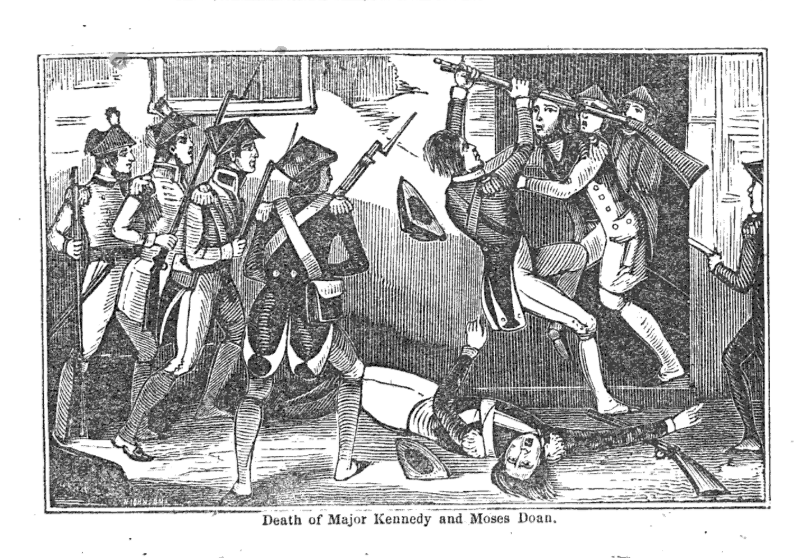
"Death of Major Kennedy and Moses Doan" from Annals of the Revolution; or, a History of the Doans

The Doan Outlaws, also known as the Doan Boys and Plumstead Cowboys, were a notorious gang of brothers from a Quaker family most renowned for being British spies during the American Revolutionary War.

The Doans were Loyalists from a Quaker family of good standing. The sons of family patriarch Joseph Doan reached manhood at the time of the American Revolutionary War. Growing up in Plumstead, Pennsylvania, the Doans excelled athletically. The Doan Boys' principal occupation was robbing Whig tax collectors and stealing horses. The gang stole over 200 horses from their neighbors in Bucks County which they then sold to the Red Coats in Philadelphia and Baltimore.

== Background ==
=== Bucks County, Pennsylvania in 1776 ===
Bucks County, an area sympathetic to the Doan outlaws with a large Loyalist population, grew out of William Penn's "holy experiment", and was guided more by Quaker "inner light" than by the traditional "rights of Englishmen". As a result of Penn's effort to create a "nation of nations", almost half of colonial Pennsylvania was non-English.

In nearby Philadelphia, the elite Proper Philadelphians were rich, charming, and tolerant, but had relinquished the role of governing the city. Philadelphia, by common agreement, was the largest and most cosmopolitan but also the most poorly governed city in all of the Thirteen Colonies. Bucks County, when compared to Massachusetts in support for a war with England, was still "The Peaceable Kingdom". No doubt Pennsylvanians were outraged by the actions of the Crown, but they were more likely to express their discontent through resolutions than violent protests. Many Pennsylvanians remained skeptical about cutting ties with England right up to the signing of the Declaration of Independence. To illustrate this, the fighting in "Penn's Woods" started seven years after the Boston Massacre. To the non-English Pennsylvanian, King George III, even at his worst, was better than what they had known in their homeland. Fat Pennsylvania's legendary prosperity helped ease discord. Bucks County boasted rich farmland, large supplies of fresh water, timber, iron, fire clay, game, and their famous fieldstone for building. The common New Englander by contrast had to choose between hardscrabble farming or dangerous fishing off rock-ribbed coasts.

== Criminal history ==
In the fall of 1770, Moses Doan left his home in anger after an argument with his father Joseph Sr. A few days later he saved the family of the young girl he loved from an Indian attack, but his subsequent declaration of love for her was rebuffed. Around this time he joined a small band of local Indians of the Wolf clan of the Lenni Lenape tribe. It is believed that he stayed with them for several months, hunting and engaging in feats of strength with them which he always won.

In 1774, Moses enlisted his brothers Aaron, Levi, Mahlon, and Joseph as well as his cousin Abraham to his gang. A handwritten note by Etta Holloway, great-granddaughter of Joseph Doan, tells the story of the outlaws this way:

They were all of the Quaker faith and did not believe in war. The new government levied a tax upon Joseph, Sr., the father of the Tory Doan boys, confiscated his farm, threw his wife, 3 daughters and youngest son off of the land, jailed Joseph Sr. for non payment of taxes and branded him on his hand as a criminal. This was the given reason for the start of the notorious group known as the Tory Doans.

However, the Pennsylvania Archives date the forfeiture of Joseph Doan's home as August 13, 1782, after the conclusion of the Revolution, and 10 months after the Doan gang robbed the treasury at Newtown.

In July 1776, Moses and Levi met with British General William Howe and offered themselves as spies. Moses earned the nickname "Eagle Spy". By this time most able-bodied men had marched off to war, leaving the area unprotected.

On August 27, 1776, Moses Doan informed General Howe of the unprotected Jamaica Pass, helping Howe defeat George Washington's army at the Battle of Long Island.

On December 25, 1776, Moses may have delivered this note to Colonel Johann Rahl's headquarters: "Washington is coming on you down the river, he will be here afore long. Doan". Colonel Rahl never read the note, however, and Washington kept the element of surprise. He was thus able to cross the Delaware River with the Continental Army and handily win the pivotal Battle of Trenton.

On June 15, 1778, Joseph Doan, Sr. was listed as a traitor (and later relisted on November 28, 1783), along with 200 other men. Aaron Doan, Mahlon Doan, and Moses Doan were listed as traitors on a July 30, 1778 supplemental list.

On June 7, 1780, Abraham Doan killed a woman in her home with her nine fearful children huddled around her. While this allegation is made in several sources, there is no confirmation of the event, and in fact, the woman's husband had refuted it. However, a 1788 broadside about Abraham and Levi Doan did state that a victim (a French gentleman who owned a store on the Susquehanna) died of wounds incurred from the gang. The gang is documented in the Pennsylvania state historical archives with threatening to kill collectors.

On October 22, 1781, three days after Cornwallis surrendered at Yorktown, the Doan gang robbed the Bucks County Treasury in Newtown of 1,307 pounds sterling, equal to £193,611 today. The monies were never recovered. The next year, the Doan gang is documented to have robbed nine other collectors. In June 1783, Moses Doan and Abraham Doan and others robbed "several" Bucks County tax collectors in their homes. A 100-pound reward was offered for their apprehension. On July 26, 1783, Moses Doan, Abraham Doan, Levi Doan, Mahlon Doan, and others robbed two Bucks county tax collectors and four citizens at night in their homes. The 100-pound reward, equal to £13,036 today, was reiterated.

An armed posse of 14 men was formed on August 28 when word was received of the Doan gang's whereabouts. Abraham and Levi Doan escaped, but Moses Doan was killed while resisting arrest. One posse member, Major Kennedy, was struck in the back by a bullet from a Doan gun, and died from the injuries three days later. A note was found in Moses Doan's pocket threatening the murder of the United States Speaker of the House Muhlenberg if Joseph Doan was not released from the Philadelphia prison. On September 14, the reward for the capture of the remaining Doans was increased to 300 pounds per outlaw.

In 1783, Mahlon Doan escaped from a Bedford, Pennsylvania jail and made his way to safety in New York City. In 1784, Joseph Doan, Jr. escaped from a Newtown jail under sentence of death for murder. Joseph Jr. changed his name and posed as a New Jersey schoolteacher for nearly a year before his real identity was discovered. He then fled to Canada.

On May 17, 1787, Aaron Doan, who had been sentenced to hang for outlawry, was pardoned on the condition he leave America and never return. On September 24, 1788, Levi Doan and his cousin Abraham Doan confessed to aiding the British and were hanged in Philadelphia.

Moses Doan's gravestone was moved by a farmer and currently lies in a hedgerow in Plumstead Township, badly weathered by the elements. The Friends Meeting House's cemetery in Plumsteadville is protected by a fieldstone wall that runs around its perimeter. Levi and Abraham Doan were buried just outside this wall because the pacifist Quakers refused to bury militants within their graveyard (a veteran of the Civil War is likewise buried outside the graveyard perimeter). The graves are adorned with their original native brownstone headstones which bear no inscriptions, following the Quaker practice at the time of their death, as well as newer headstones that identify them as outlaws.

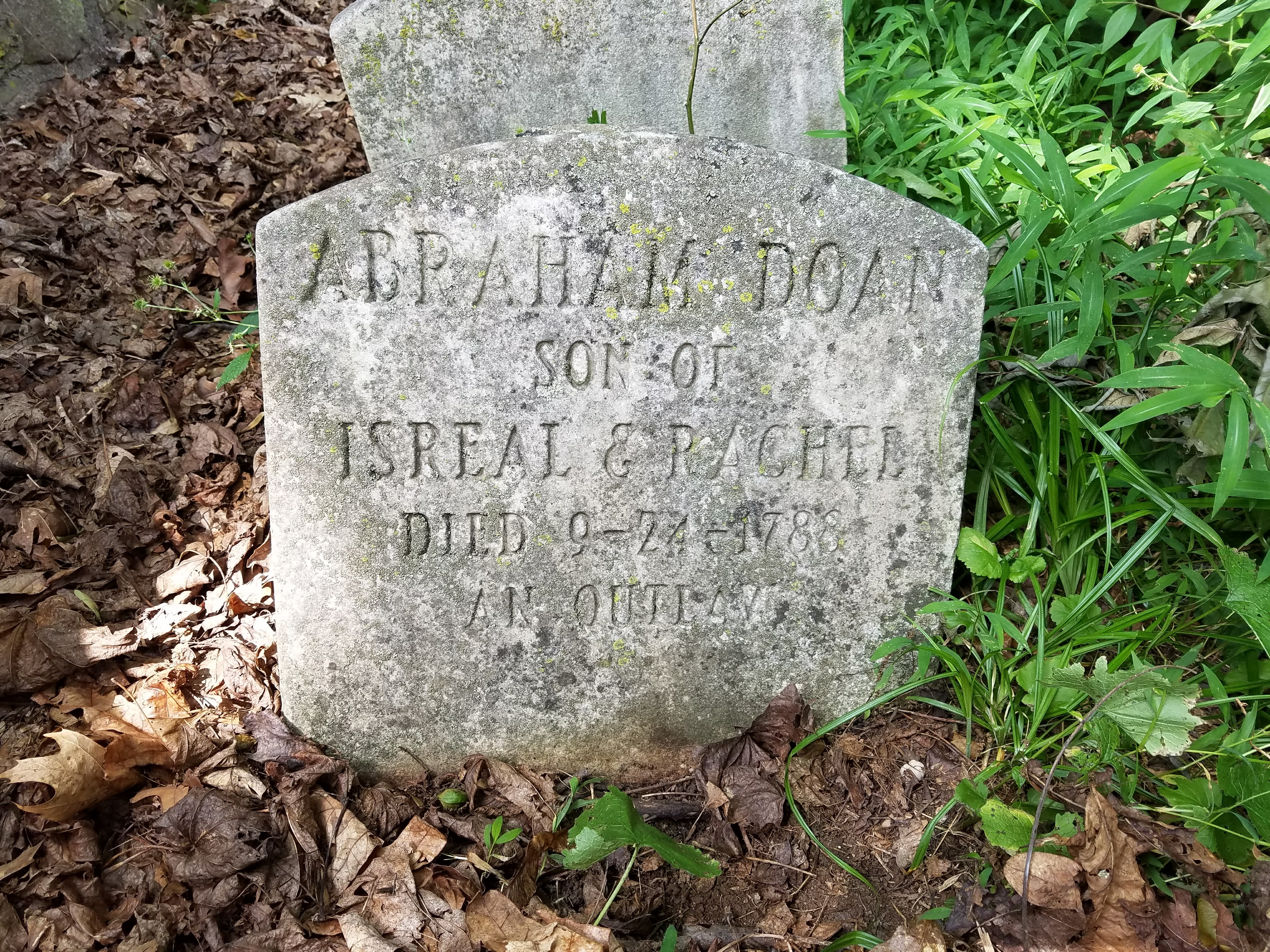
Replaced headstone of Abraham Doan grave

== The Doan myth ==
In the centuries following the Revolutionary War, a substantial mythology has accumulated regarding the Doans and their actions, especially locally in the parts of Pennsylvania they once inhabited. Among this body of folklore are several oft-repeated anecdotes and sayings of uncertain provenance:

- Moses riding his horse off the cliffs of Fleesedale Road (today Fleecydale Rd. in Solebury Township, Pennsylvania)
- "Never sneak up on a Doan dead or alive"
- A legend connecting the Doans with two million dollars in buried treasure

The Doans were polarizing figures. Loyalists wrote of the Doan gang sympathetically, as if their crimes were justified because they undermined the oppressors in favor of the oppressed, akin to Robin Hood. Patriots referred to them as demons. No doubt their success as spies, horsemen, and athletes, their bravery, and their numerous criminal exploits hardened both views.

== In popular culture ==
As of August 2019, an American historical drama television series about the Doan outlaws, America's Original Outlaws, was in development. It was being produced by Mark I. McNutt, whose company Envy Media Com was also producing a documentary preview to the narrative series tentatively titled Outlaw Treasure: Mystery of the Doan Gang, for which principal filming wrapped in December 2021. The documentary explores the many Doan legends, including the discovery of a previously unexplored Doan cave and hideout in Buckingham, Pennsylvania. As of July 2024, it was in post-production and a trailer was released.

In July 2022, it was announced that the Mercer Museum would open an exhibit about the Doan outlaws in 2024. The exhibit, titled The Doan Gang: Outlaws of the Revolution, opened on May 4, 2024, scheduled to run through December 31, 2026.

On July 3, 2024, Expedition Unknown aired an episode entitled "Traitors' Treasure of 1776" about money the Doan gang stole during the American Revolution.

== Sources ==
- The War for Independence and the Transformation of American Society
- The New Doan Book by George MacReynolds
- Early History of Washington's Crossing, and Its Environs by Warren S. Ely of Doylestown p. 386
- Watson's Annals of Philadelphia and Pennsylvania, 1857 - Area History: Chapter 13 - Part II, Vol II
- The Tavern at the Ferry by Edwin Tunis pages 59–102
- The Doan Gang: The Remarkable History of America's Most Notorious Loyalist Outlaws by Terry A. McNealy ISBN 978-1-59416-062-2
- Between the lines: banditti of the American Revolution by Harry M. Ward
- Encyclopedia of frontier biography, Volume 4 by Dan L. Thrapp
