= Cabin Run, Columbia County, Pennsylvania =

Stream in Pennsylvania, United States

Coordinates: 41°03′02″N 76°21′49″W

Cabin Run
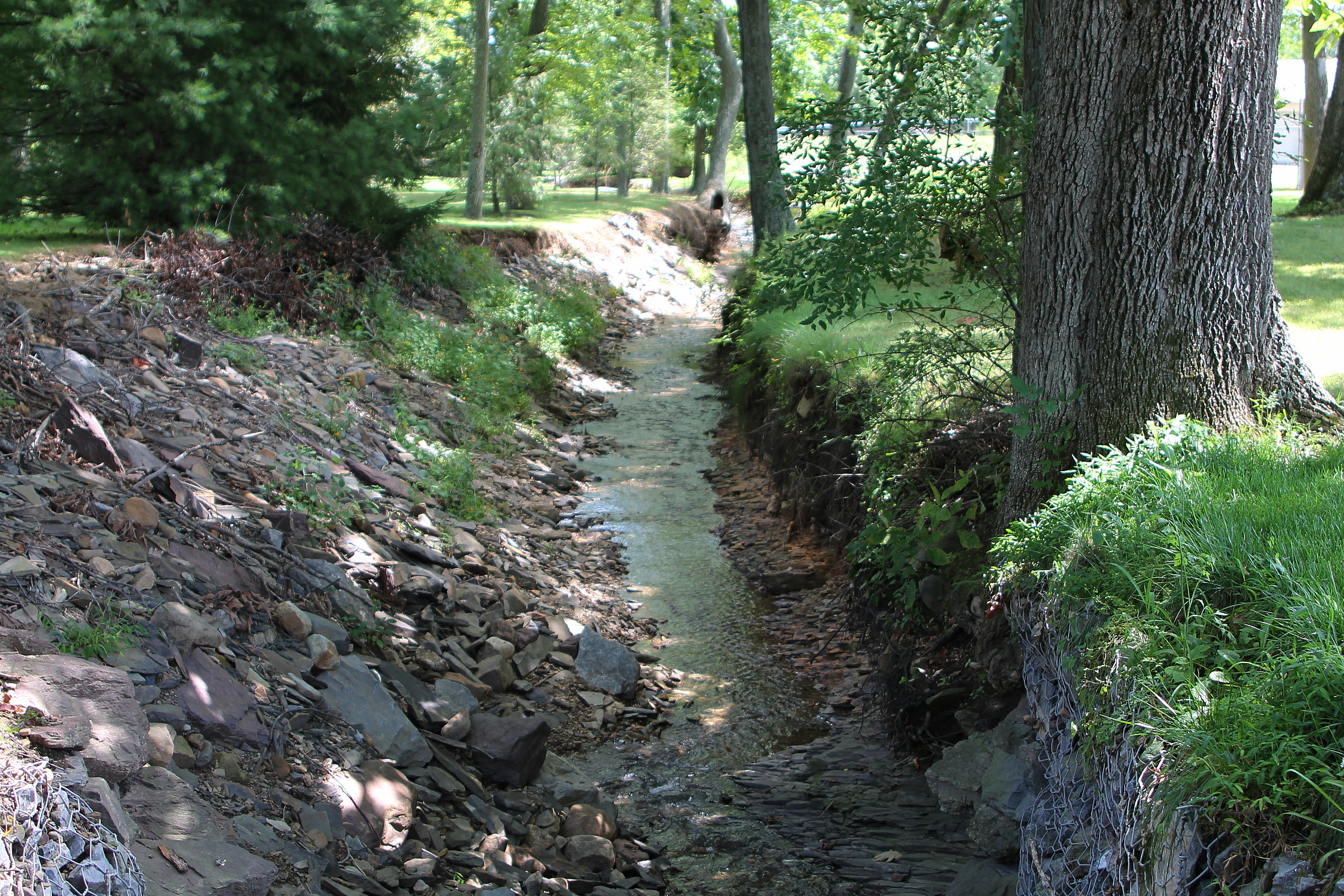
- Cabin Run looking downstream from Fowlersville Road
- Etymology: cabin built on the stream by the Solomon brothers

Physical characteristics
- Source
  - location: valley on Summer Hill in North Centre Township, Pennsylvania
  - elevation: 840 to 860 feet (260 to 260 m)
- Mouth
  - location: West Branch Briar Creek in North Centre Township, Pennsylvania
  - elevation: 617 ft (188 m)
- Length: 1.2 mi (1.9 km)
- Basin size: 0.72 mi^{2} (1.9 km^{2})
- Discharge
  - average: 0.53 cubic feet per second (0.015 m^{3}/s) (median)

Basin features
- Progression: West Branch Briar Creek → Briar Creek → Susquehanna River → Chesapeake Bay

Cabin Run is a tributary of West Branch Briar Creek in Columbia County, Pennsylvania, in the United States. It is approximately 1.2 miles (1.9 km) long and flows through North Centre Township. The watershed of the stream has an area of 0.72 square miles (1.9 km^{2}). The waters of the stream are slightly acidic. Its watershed lies over shale and siltstone.

Several early attempts at settlement on Cabin Run occurred in 1777 and 1778.

== Course ==
Cabin Run begins in a valley on Summer Hill in North Centre Township. It flows southeast for a short distance before turning south and flowing parallel to Cabin Run Road for several tenths of a mile. Upon leaving the valley, the stream crosses Fowlersville Road and turns southeast for a short distance before turning south again. After another few tenths of a mile, it reaches its confluence with West Branch Briar Creek.

Cabin Run reaches its confluence with West Branch Briar Creek 3.57 miles (5.75 km) upstream of its mouth.

== Hydrology ==
The discharge of Cabin Run ranges from 0.17 to 15.7 cubic feet per second. The median discharge is 0.53 cubic feet per second. The water temperature of the stream ranges from 33.98 to 72.32 °F (1.10 to 22.40 °C).

The pH of Cabin Run ranges from 7.28 to 7.9, with a median of 7.73. The concentration of total dissolved solids in the stream ranges from 42 to 106 parts per million. The median concentration of total dissolved solids is 59 parts per million. The stream sometimes has high concentrations of lead and nitrates.

In a visual assessment by the Briar Creek Association for Watershed Solutions, Cabin Run was given a score of 5.6 on a scale of 1 to 10. The stream scored best on nutrient enhancement and fish barriers and it scored worst on streambank stability and riparian buffering. Of ten sites in the Briar Creek watershed, this location has a priority rank of 5.

== Geography and geology ==
The elevation near the mouth of Cabin Run is 617 feet (188 m) above sea level. The elevation of the stream at its source is between 840 and 860 feet (260 and 260 m).

A hill known as Summer Hill is in the watershed of Cabin Run.

The mouth of Cabin Run lies over calcareous shale. The rest of the lower part of the watershed is on shale. The upper reaches of the watershed lie over siltstone. The soil in an area in the lower reaches of the stream is of the Zipp Series. This is a poorly drained silt loam.

The lower reaches of the watershed of Cabin Run are over rock of the Mahantango Formation, although there is also a narrow band of the Harrell Formation. The watershed's upper reaches lie over rock of the Trimmers Rock Formation. These rock formations come from the Upper Devonian and the Middle Devonian.

== Watershed ==
The watershed of Cabin Run has an area of 0.72 square miles (1.9 km^{2}). The watershed of the stream is by far the smallest named sub-watershed of Briar Creek.

Major roads in the watershed of Cabin Run include Fowlersville Road, Eckrote Road, and Hosler Road. The community of Fowlersville is near the stream.

== History and etymology ==
Alexander Aikman came from New Jersey in the summer of 1777 and built a cabin on Cabin Run. However, he returned to New Jersey in the autumn of the same year. Moses Van Campen attempted to inhabit the cabin shortly afterwards, but it was burned down by Native Americans. Joseph Salmon also attempted to settle on the stream in 1777, but his cabin was burned down in the spring of 1778.

A migration to the Fishing Creek valley in 1792 may have passed by Cabin Run.

Historically, a mill was operated on Cabin Run. Its purpose was to grind plaster and livestock feed.

According to legend, Cabin Run is named after a cabin built on it by Joseph and Isaiah Solomon.

== See also ==
- Fester Hollow
- List of rivers of Pennsylvania
