= Cabin Run (Tohickon Creek tributary) =

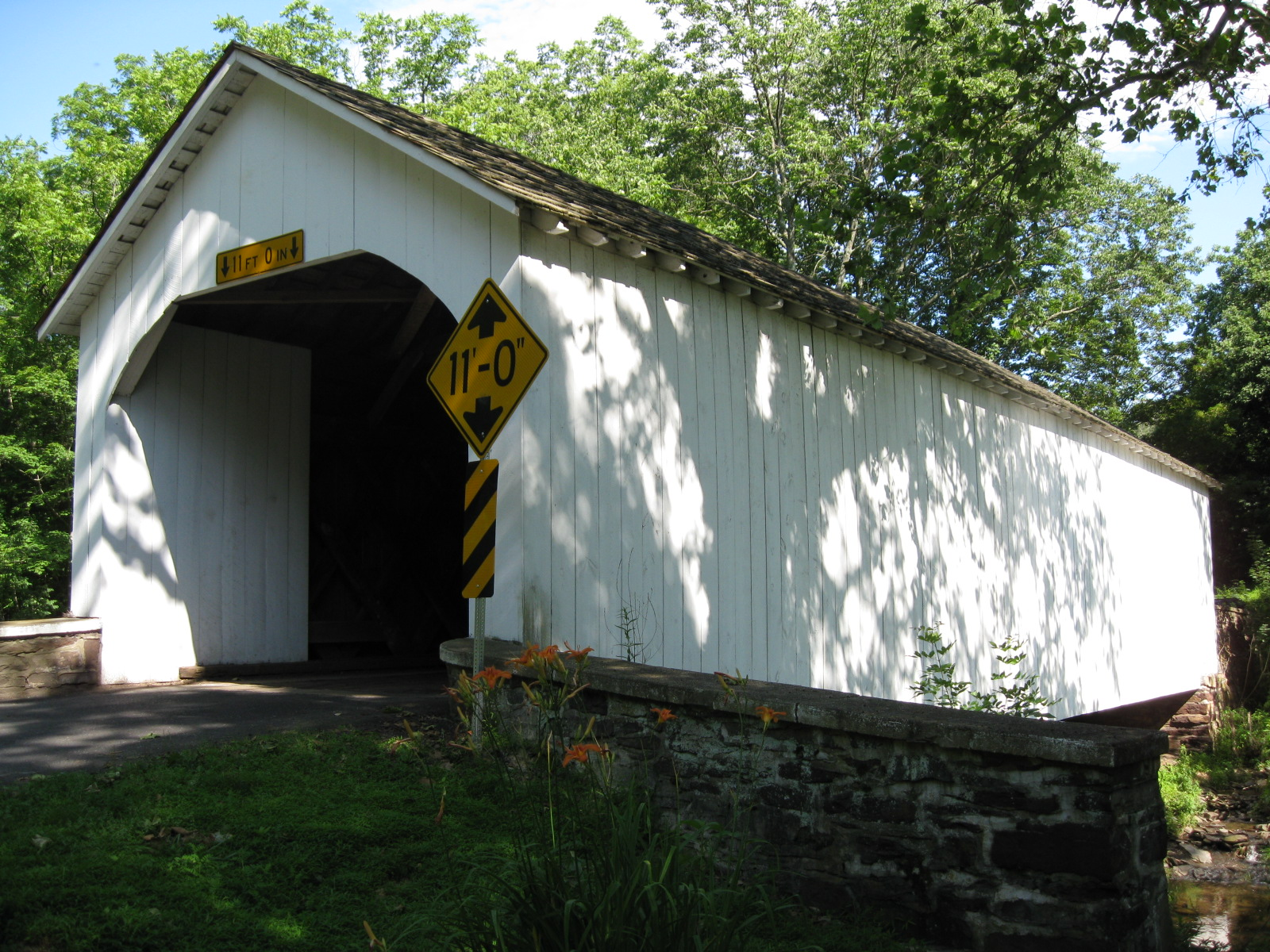
- Cabin Run Covered Bridge, Plumstead Township, Bucks County, Pennsylvania

- Location within Pennsylvania

Location
- Country: United States
- State: Pennsylvania
- County: Bucks
- Township: Bedminster, Plumstead

Physical characteristics
- Source
  - coordinates: 40°23′53″N 75°10′37″W
  - elevation: 481 feet (147 m)
- Mouth
  - coordinates: 40°25′57.7″N 75°6′39.5″W
  - elevation: 263 feet (80 m)
- Length: 4.5 miles (7.2 km)
- Basin size: 6 square miles (16 km^{2})

Basin features
- Progression: Cabin Run → Tohickon Creek → Delaware River → Delaware Bay
- River system: Delaware River
- Bridges: Kellers Church Road; Pennsylvania Route 611 (Easton Road); Pennsylvania Route 413 (Durham Road); Wismer Road, Carversville Road
- Slope: 4.5 feet per mile (0.85 m/km)

Cabin Run is a tributary of the Tohickon Creek in Bucks County, Pennsylvania, rising in the southwestern portion of Bedminster Township to its confluence with the Tohickon Creek in northeastern Plumstead Township. Its course is approximately 4.5 miles (7.2 km)

== History ==
Cabin Run was so named for the log cabins and stone homes that were built here in the 1700s, and appeared on maps as early as 1770. At one time the Leatherman grist, saw, and cider mill, and the Loux grist and saw mill were operated along the stream. Cabin Run Covered Bridge and Loux Covered Bridge were added to the National Register of Historic Places on 1 December 1980.

== Statistics ==
The GNIS I.D. number of Cabin Run is 1170857, Pennsylvania Department of Environmental Resources Code Number is 03116. Cabin Run's watershed is 6.00 square miles (15.5 km^{2}), and it meets at its confluence at the Tohickon Creek's 4.50 river mile, its average slope is 48.44 feet per mile (9.174 m/km).

== Course ==
Cabin Run rises from an unnamed pond to the west of the intersection of Kellers Church Road and Scott Road in Bedminster Township, approximately 1.36 miles (2.19 km) northwest of the village of Plumsteadville and 2.6 miles (4.2 km) southwest of Pipersville. The creek flows generally northeast and includes four unnamed tributaries. Cabin Run meets the Tohickon approximately 310 feet (94 m) to the northeast from the Cabin Run covered bridge.

== Geology ==
- Appalachian Highlands Division
  - Piedmont Province
    - Gettysburg-Newark Lowland Section
      - Brunswick Formation

Cabin Run lies within a narrow strip of the Brunswick Formation amongst a region of the Lockatong Formation. The Brunswick Formation consists of shale, mudstone, siltstone, green and brown shale. Mineralogy includes argillite and hornfels.

== Crossings and Bridges ==
Crossing	NBI Number	Length	Lanes	Spans	Material/Design	Built	Reconstructed	Latitude	Longitude
Kellers Church Road	43576	7.3 metres (24 ft)	-	-	Concrete culvert	2006	-	-	-
Pennsylvania Route 611 (Easton Road)	-	-	-	-	-	-	-	-	-
Pennsylvania Route 413 (Durham Road)	-	-	-	-	-	-	-	-	-
Wismer Road (south side), changes to Carversville Road (north side) at the Loux Covered Bridge	-	-	-	-	-	-	-	-	-
Covered Bridge Road (Cabin Run Covered Bridge)	7550	21 metres (69 ft)	1	1	Wood or Timber Truss - thru	-	-	40°25'55.6"N	75°6'45.7"W

== See also ==
- List of rivers of the United States
- List of rivers of Pennsylvania
- List of Delaware River tributaries
- Tohickon Creek
