= Fester Hollow =

River in Pennsylvania, United States

Coordinates: 41°03′15″N 76°19′56″W

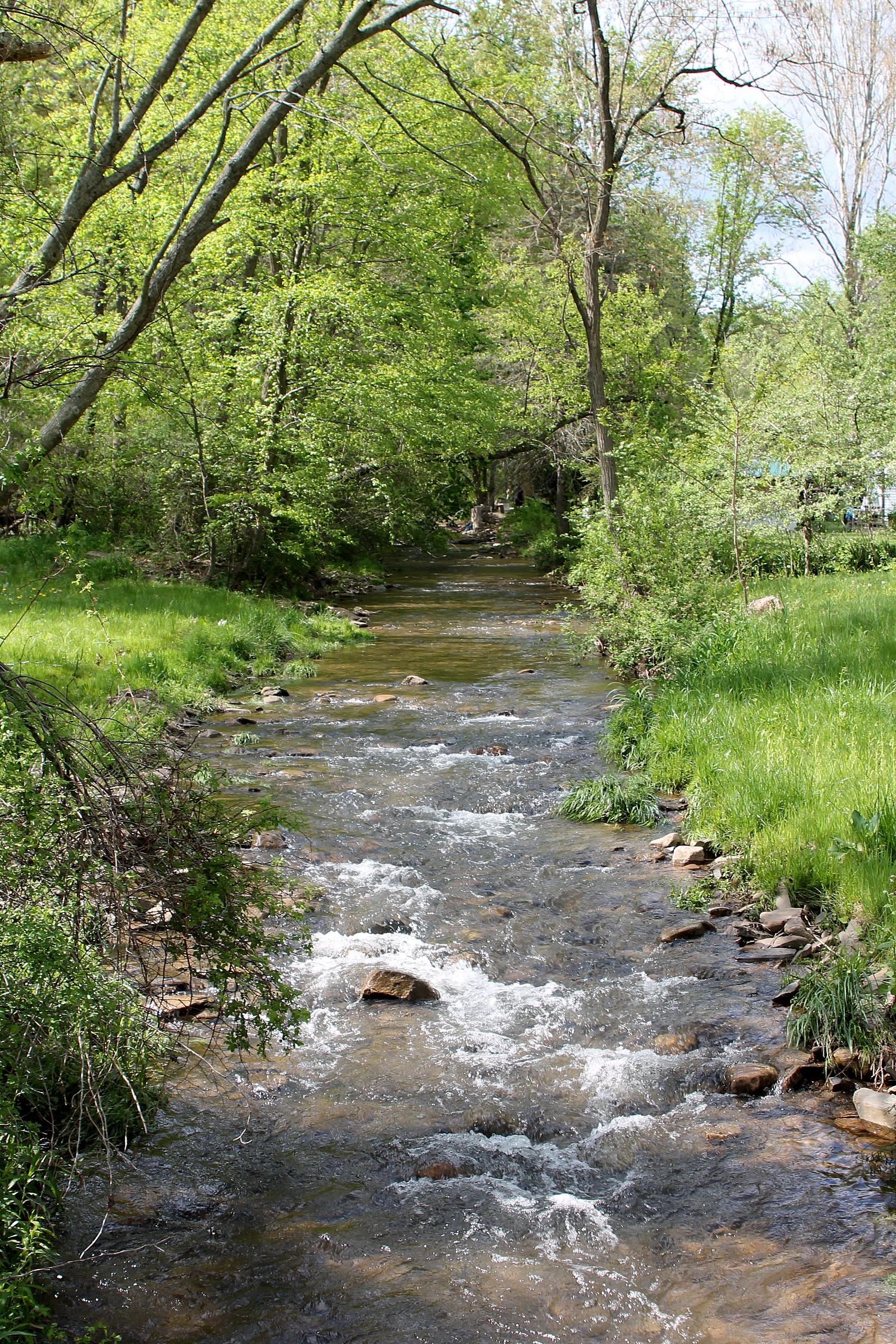
Fester Hollow

Fester Hollow is a tributary of West Branch Briar Creek in Columbia County, Pennsylvania, in the United States. It is 4.54 miles (7.31 km) long.

Fester Hollow was most likely named in the middle of the 1800s, before 1860, after John Fester, a landowner and farmer.

Bedrock in the watershed of Fester Hollow consists of shale, siltstone, and limestone. The stream's watershed has an area of 4.54 square miles. Its median discharge is 3.54 cubic feet per second and its median pH is 7.66.

== Course ==
Fester Hollow begins in northeastern North Centre Township, on the southern side of Knob Mountain. The stream flows southeast until it reaches Pennsylvania Route 93, which it crosses. It then turns south-southeast and flows parallel to Pennsylvania Route 93 for a short distance, passing by a cemetery. When Pennsylvania Route 93 curves east, Fester Hollow continues going south-southeast. It then passes by the community of Fowlersville and then enters West Branch Briar Creek.

== Hydrology and climate ==
The discharge of Fester Hollow in its lower reaches ranges from 0.75 to 34 cubic feet per second. The median discharge of the stream is 3.54 cubic feet per second. The minimum water temperature in the stream is 34.4 °F (1.3 °C) and the maximum temperature is 70.7 °F (21.5 °C). The median temperature is 54.4 °F (12.4 °C). The stream's water temperature is often higher than the maximum required temperature for a stream to be considered a cold-water fishery.

The median electrical conductivity of Fester Hollow is 89 milli-siemens. The highest recorded electrical conductivity is 351 milli-siemens and the lowest recorded electrical conductivity is 69 milli-siemens.

The minimum pH of Fester Hollow is 7.06 and the median pH is 7.66. The maximum pH of the stream is 9.17, making it the most alkaline stream in the watershed of Briar Creek. The total concentration of dissolved solids in Fester Hollow ranges from 34 to 169 parts per million. The median concentration is 44 parts per million. The stream also has higher-than-ideal concentrations of nitrates.

The watershed of Fester Hollow is in Pennsylvania's Climate Division #5.

In 2012, the Briar Creek Association for Watershed Solutions performed a visual assessment of Fester Hollow, rating it for various qualities, including streambank stability and the quality of the riparian buffer. The creek was rated as 5.4 out of 10, indicating "poor" water quality.

== Geology and geography ==
The bedrock in the southern tip of the Fester Hollow watershed consists of calcareous shale and a small amount of limestone. North of this is a band of shale bedrock. The northern and central parts of the watershed have siltstone as their bedrock. The Zipp Series, a silt loam soil, is found on the lower reaches of the stream. Fester Hollow is in the ridge and valley geographical region of the Appalachian Mountains. There are forested ravines in along the stream.

The lower reaches of Fester Hollow are at an elevation of 194 metres (636 ft) above sea level.

== Watershed ==
Most of the watershed of Fester Hollow is located in North Centre Township. However, the northeastern corner of the watershed is in Briar Creek Township. Major roads in the watershed include Mountain Road and Pennsylvania Route 93. The stream's watershed has an area of 4.54 square miles.

== Biology ==
Wild trout reproduce along the entire length of Fester Hollow.

Forest corridors on Fester Hollow connect to the forests on Knob Mountain.

== See also ==
- Cabin Run
- List of rivers of Pennsylvania
