= Cabin Run Covered Bridge =

- U.S. National Register of Historic Places
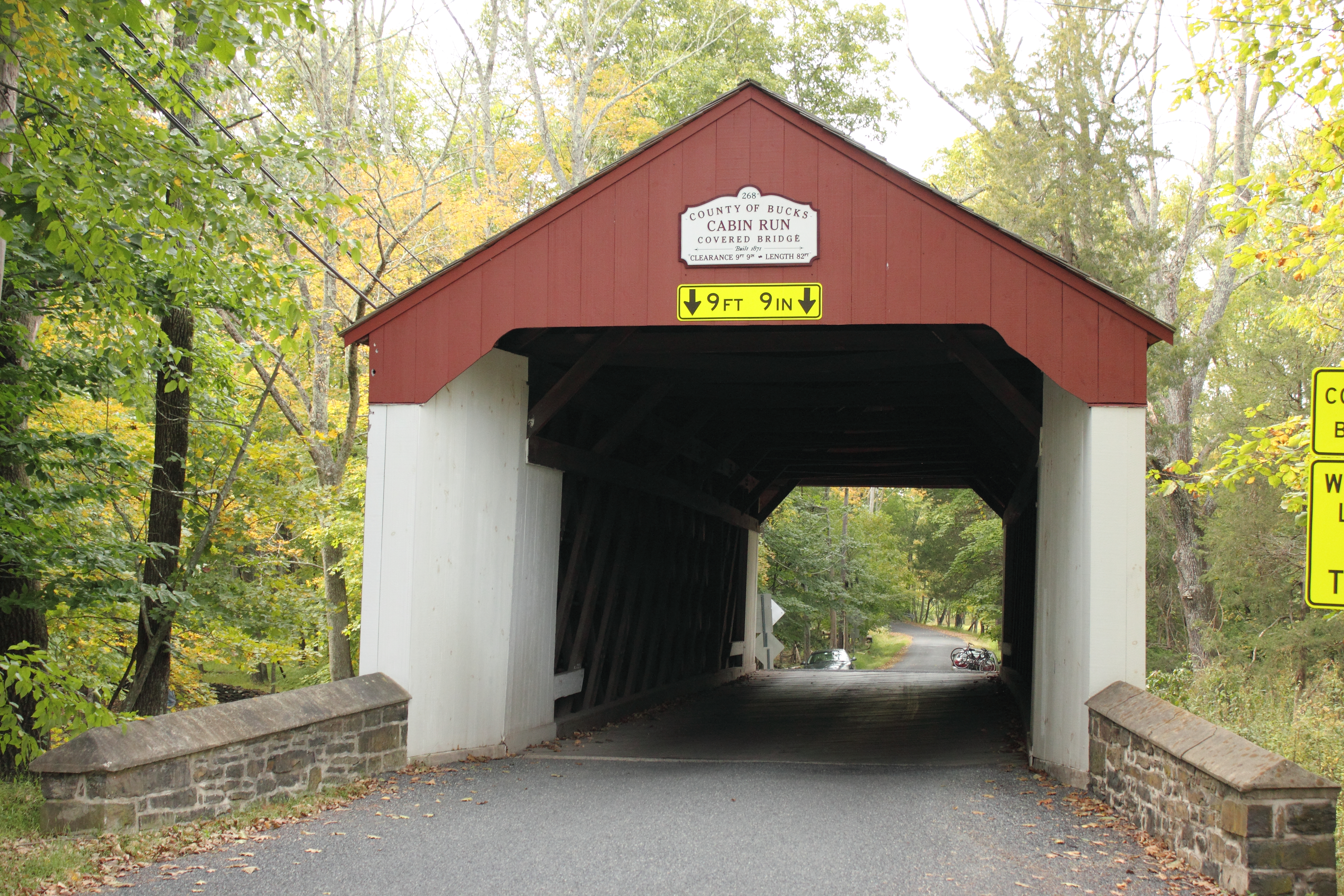
- Cabin Run Covered Bridge, September 2012

- Location within Pennsylvania Location within the United States
- Location: South of Tinicum on Legislative Route 09099 in Plumstead Township, Point Pleasant, Pennsylvania
- Coordinates: 40°25′55″N 75°6′45″W
- Area: 0.1 acres (0.040 ha)
- Built: 1871
- Architectural style: Town truss
- MPS: Covered Bridges of the Delaware River Watershed TR
- NRHP reference No.: 80003443
- Added to NRHP: December 1, 1980

The Cabin Run Covered Bridge is a historic covered bridge located in Point Pleasant, Plumstead Township, Bucks County, Pennsylvania. The bridge was built in 1871, and is 15 feet (4.6 m) wide and has a length of 82 feet (25 m). The Town truss bridge crosses Cabin Run (creek) downstream from the Loux Covered Bridge.

It was added to the National Register of Historic Places on December 1, 1980.

== See also ==
- National Register of Historic Places listings in Bucks County, Pennsylvania
- List of bridges documented by the Historic American Engineering Record in Pennsylvania
- List of bridges on the National Register of Historic Places in Pennsylvania
