= Loux Covered Bridge =

- U.S. National Register of Historic Places
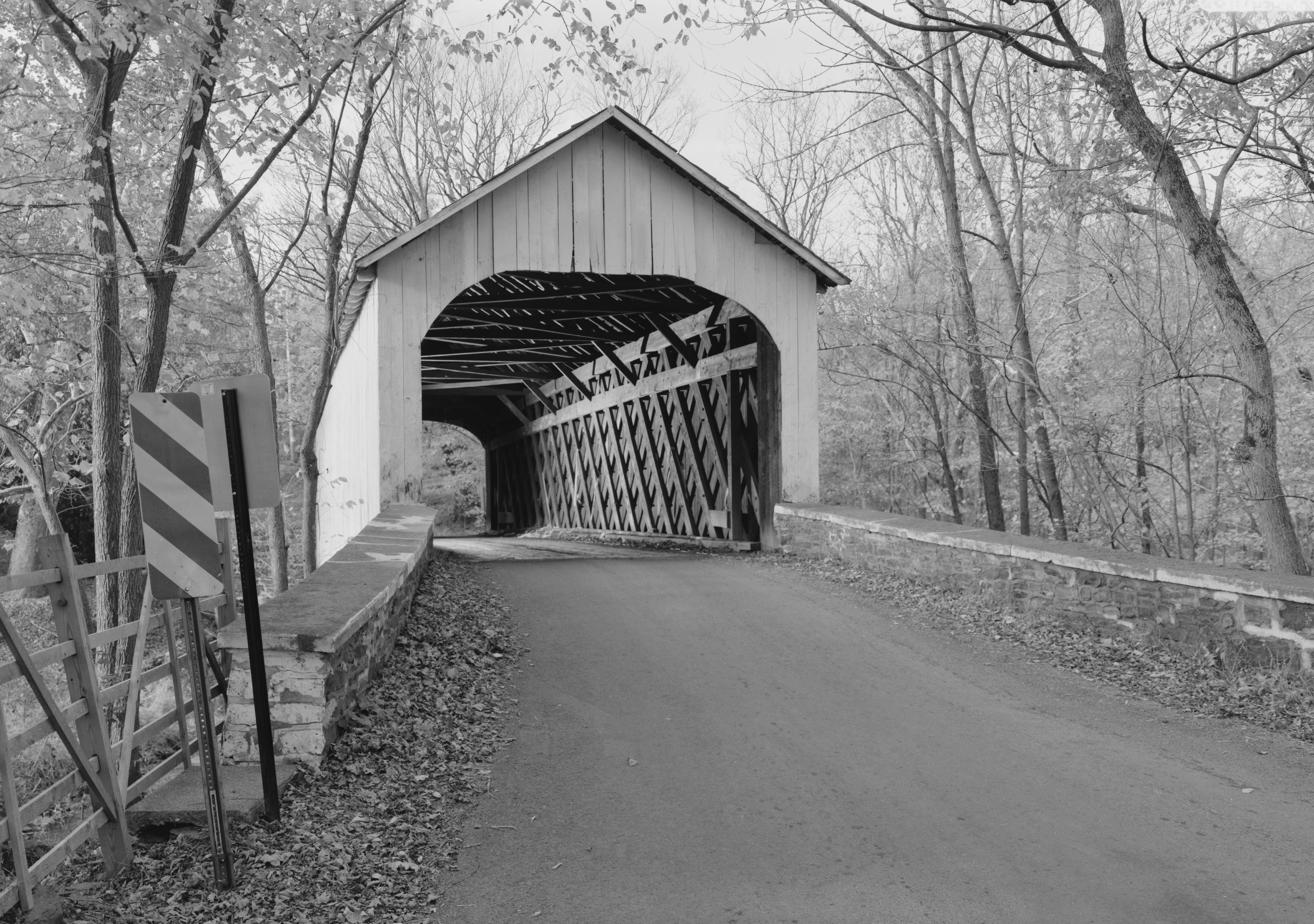
- Loux Covered Bridge, HAER Photo

- Location within Pennsylvania Location within the United States
- Location: Southeast of Pipersville on Legislative Route 09060, Bedminster Township and Plumstead Township, Pennsylvania
- Coordinates: 40°25′23″N 75°7′40″W
- Area: 0.1 acres (0.040 ha)
- Built: 1874
- MPS: Covered Bridges of the Delaware River Watershed TR
- NRHP reference No.: 80003442
- Added to NRHP: December 1, 1980

Loux Covered Bridge is a historic wooden covered bridge located on Wismer Road crossing Cabin Run (creek) upstream from the Cabin Run Covered Bridge in Bedminster Township and Plumstead Township, Bucks County, Pennsylvania. It was built in 1874 by David Sutton out of hemlock in the Town Truss style. This is one of the shorter covered bridges in Bucks County at only 60 feet (18 m) long.

The bridge was added to the National Register of Historic Places on December 1, 1980.

== See also ==
- National Register of Historic Places listings in Bucks County, Pennsylvania
- List of bridges documented by the Historic American Engineering Record in Pennsylvania
- List of bridges on the National Register of Historic Places in Pennsylvania
