= America's Original Outlaws =

American historical drama series

- Genre: Historical drama
- Created by: Mark I. McNutt
- Directed by: Mark I. McNutt
- Country of origin: United States
- Original language: English

Production
- Producer: Mark I. McNutt
- Production companies: Envy Media Communications, LLC

America's Original Outlaws is an upcoming American historical drama television series and commercial brand created and produced by Mark I. McNutt. The show revolves around the Doan Outlaws and their exploits during the American Revolutionary War, including the robbery of the Bucks County Treasury in Newtown, Pennsylvania, which, when adjusted, is believed to be the largest robbery of public funds in U.S. history.

== Premise ==
Quaker cousins Moses and Abraham Doan lead an eponymous Loyalist gang in Pennsylvania during the American Revolutionary War. Known for their exceptional physical power and their purported supernatural abilities, the Doan Outlaws quickly become some of the American Patriots' most-feared enemies, jeopardizing the independence of the United States.

== Production ==
The series is currently in preproduction.

A promo trailer was filmed in December 2017 and was produced in collaboration with Washington Crossing Historic Park, DeSales University, and the Pennsylvania Department of Conservation and Natural Resources. It was posted to Vimeo in November 2018.
