= Gardenville–North Branch Rural Historic District =

Historic district in Pennsylvania, United States

- U.S. National Register of Historic Places
- U.S. Historic district
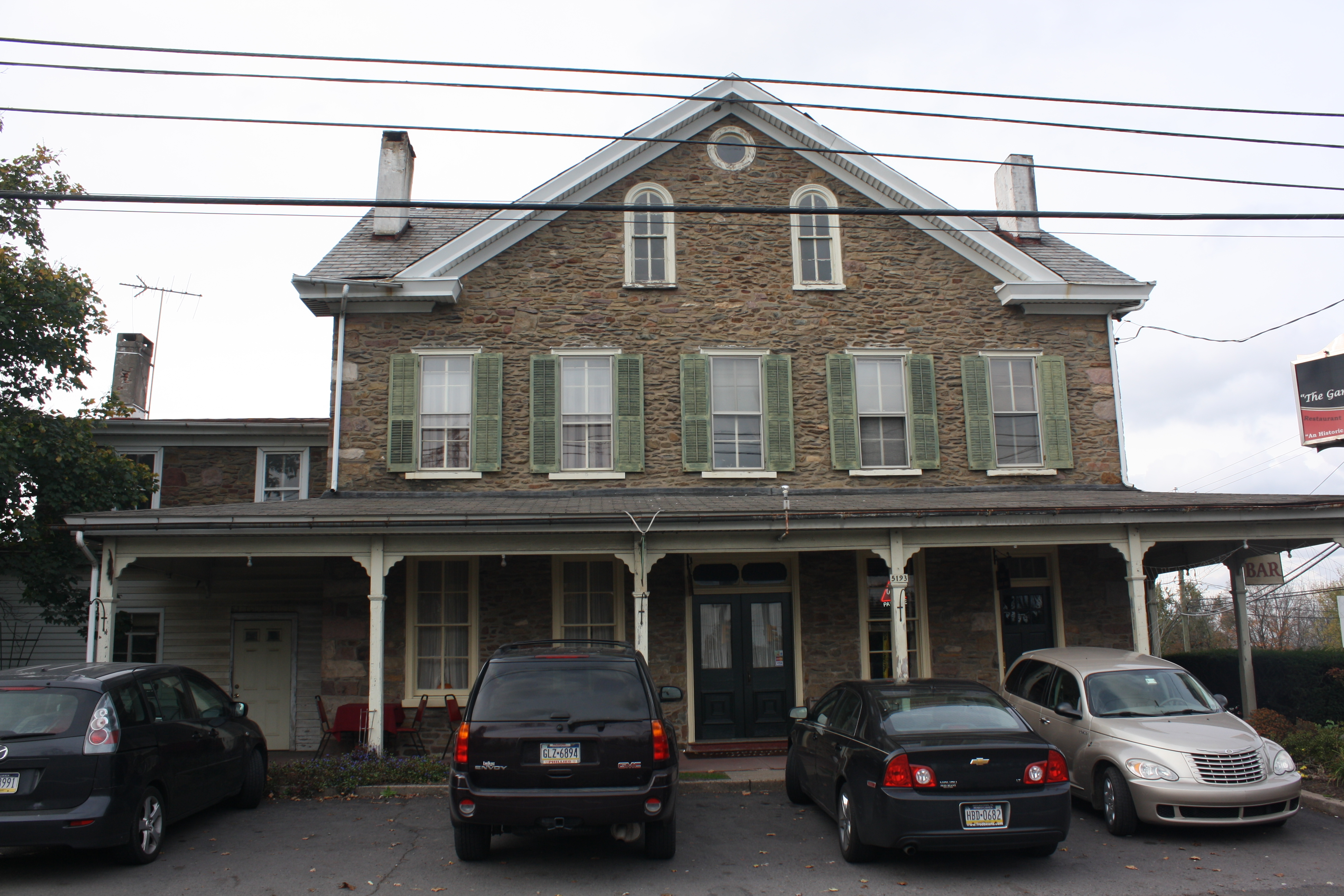
- The Gardenville Hotel. October 2012.

- Location within Pennsylvania Location within the United States
- Location: Roughly bounded by Durham Rd., Pt. Pleasant Pike, Valley Park Rd. and N. Branch Neshaminy Cr., Gardenville, Plumstead Township, Pennsylvania
- Coordinates: 40°22′35″N 75°06′57″W
- Area: 600 acres (240 ha)
- Architect: Multiple
- Architectural style: Italianate, Georgian
- NRHP reference No.: 91000954
- Added to NRHP: November 7, 1991

Gardenville–North Branch Rural Historic District is a national historic district located at Gardenville, Plumstead Township, Bucks County, Pennsylvania. The district includes 107 contributing buildings, 4 contributing sites, and 18 contributing structures in the village of Gardenville and surrounding rural areas. They include a variety of residential and commercial buildings and related farm outbuildings and structures, some of which are representative of the vernacular Georgian and Italianate styles. Notable buildings include the Gardenville Hotel (c. 1875), Plough Tavern (c. 1761), Quaker Meetinghouse (1875), Ewing-Michener Farm, Asha Foulke Farm, Wismer-Myers Farm, Durham Crest Farmhouse, and Berger Poultry Farm. The district includes a number of notable bank barns.

It was added to the National Register of Historic Places in 1991.
