= Dyerstown Historic District =

Historic district in Dyerstown, Pennsylvania, United States

- U.S. National Register of Historic Places
- U.S. Historic district
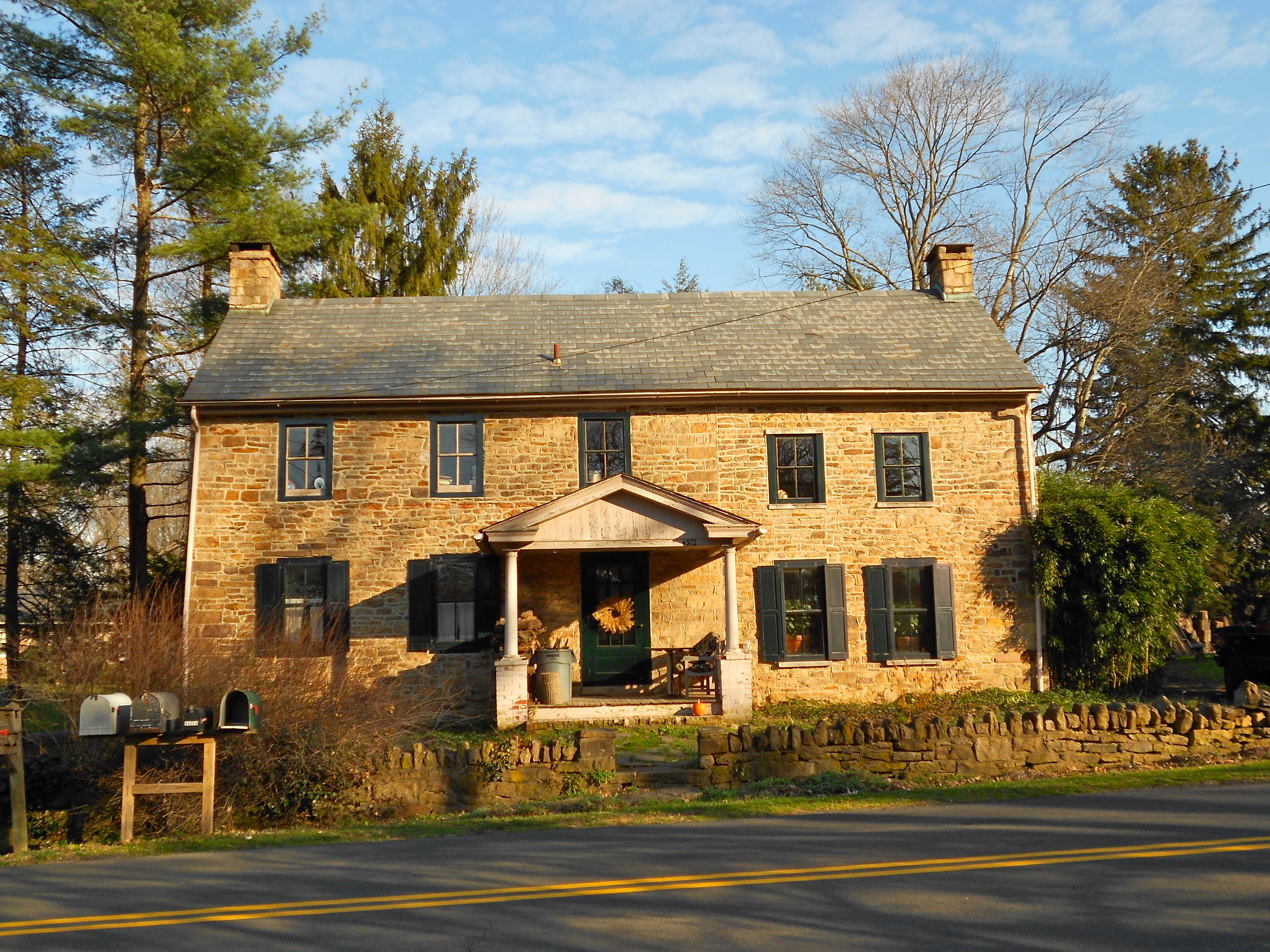
- House in the Dyerstown Historic District, December 2011

- Location within Pennsylvania Location within the United States
- Location: Along Old Easton Rd. near jct. of Stony Ln., Dyerstown, Plumstead Township, Pennsylvania
- Coordinates: 40°20′28″N 75°07′34″W
- Area: 19 acres (7.7 ha)
- Built: 1798–1870
- Architectural style: Georgian, Vernacular Colonial, Federal
- NRHP reference No.: 86003574
- Added to NRHP: January 15, 1987

Dyerstown Historic District is a national historic district located in Dyerstown, Plumstead Township, Bucks County, Pennsylvania. The district includes 17 contributing buildings and 3 contributing structures in the crossroads village of Dyerstown. It is a largely residential district, with dwellings dating to the turn of the 19th century. The most recent dwelling was built about 1870. Some of the houses are reflective of vernacular Georgian style. The district also includes a former grist mill (1758, 1822) and associated outbuildings. The contributing structures are a stone arch bridge, and head race, dam, and remains of the mill race.

It was added to the National Register of Historic Places in 1986.
