= West Branch Briar Creek =

Tributary of Briar Creek in Columbia County, Pennsylvania

Coordinates: 41°03′09″N 76°16′47″W

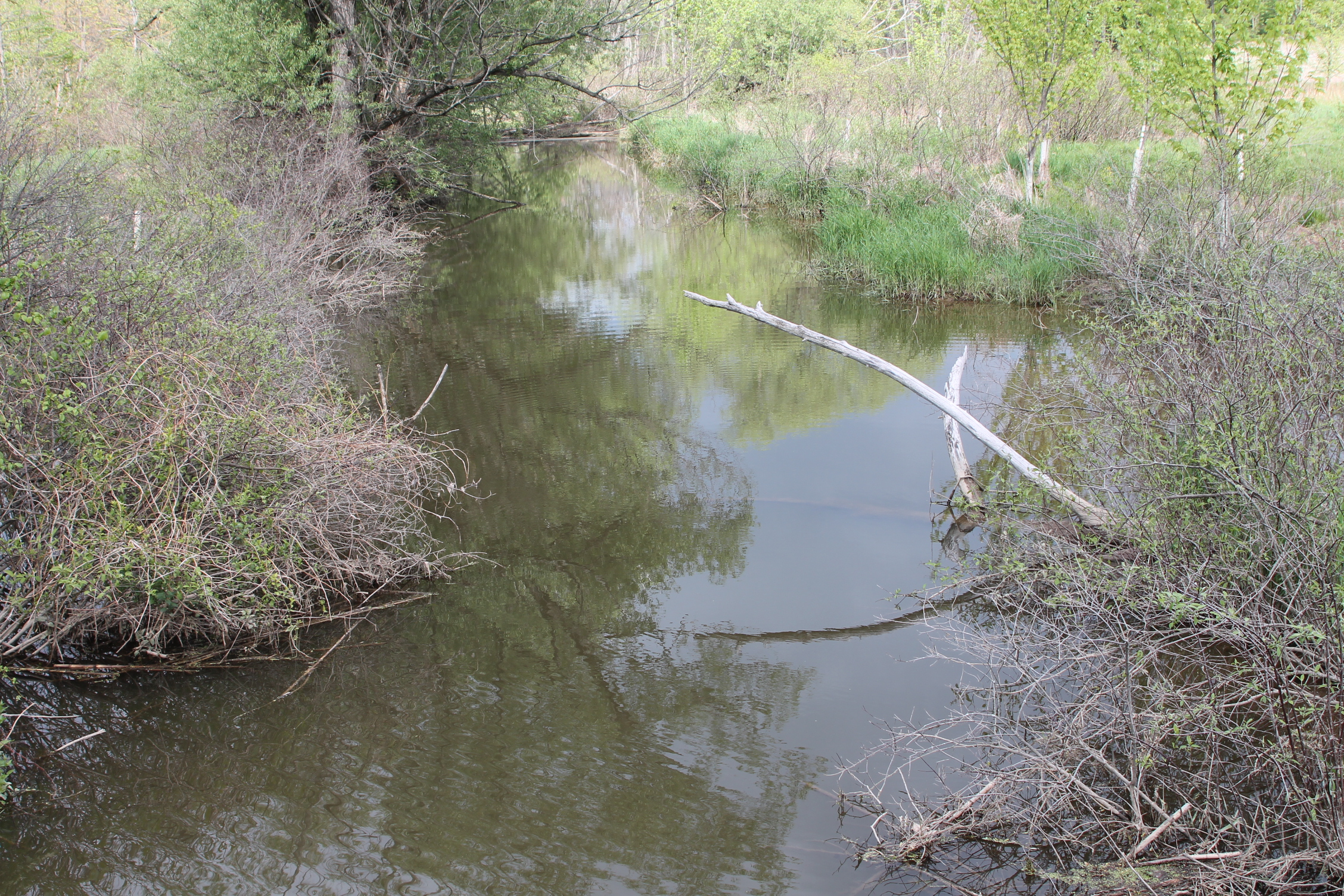
West Branch Briar Creek

West Branch Briar Creek is a tributary of Briar Creek, in Columbia County, Pennsylvania, in the United States. It is approximately 6.53 miles (10.51 km) long. The creek flows through North Centre Township and Briar Creek Township and has two tributaries: Cabin Run and Fester Hollow. Its watershed has an area of 12.06 square miles.

The discharge of West Branch Briar Creek ranges from 0.67 to 33.1 cubic meters per second. Rocks found in the watershed include shale, sandstone, siltstone, mudstone, and limestone.

The Fowlersville Covered Bridge used to cross West Branch Briar Creek.

== Course ==
West Branch Briar Creek begins in western North Centre Township, near the Hidlay Church. The creek flows east-northeast on fairly level ground. It receives the tributary Cabin Run, which flows south from Summer Hill, after some distance, and continues heading east-northeast. A number of miles later, the creek picks up the tributary Fester Hollow. It then turns northeast and passes near the community of Fowlersville. It then begins flowing parallel to Pennsylvania Route 93 and exits North Centre Township. Upon exiting North Centre Township, the creek enters Briar Creek Township. Shortly afterwards, it reaches its confluence with Briar Creek.

=== Tributaries ===
There are two named tributaries to West Branch Briar Creek: Cabin Run and Fester Hollow. Fester Hollow is several times longer than Cabin Run and its watershed is far larger. Cabin Run is 1.22 miles (1.96 km) long and Fester Hollow is 5.66 miles (9.11 km) long.

== Hydrology ==
The discharge of West Branch Briar Creek ranges from 0.67 to 31.1 cubic meters per second. The median discharge is 3.2 cubic meters per second. The water temperature of the creek ranges from 35.6 °F (2.0 °C) to 71.6 °F (22.0 °C), with a median of 57.38 °F (14.10 °C). According to the Briar Creek Association for Watershed Solutions, the water temperature is often higher than they consider acceptable.

The minimum pH of West Branch Briar Creek is 6.96 and the maximum pH is 8.31. The median pH of the creek is 7.87. The electrical conductivity of the creek's waters ranges from 117 to 281 milli-siemens, with a median of 204 milli-siemens. The concentration of dissolved solids in the creek ranges from 58 to 141 parts per million. The median concentration of dissolved solids in the creek is 102 parts per million.

The concentrations of lead and nitrates in West Branch Briar Creek are higher than ideal.

In 2012, the Briar Creek Association for Watershed Solutions performed a visual assessment of West Branch Briar Creek, rating it for various qualities, including streambank stability and the quality of the riparian buffer. The creek was rated as 7.1 out of 10, indicating "fair" water quality.

== Geology and geography ==
Most of the southern part of the watershed of West Branch Briar Creek lies over either shale or calcareous shale. However, there is a small area of limestone as well. Most of the northern part of the watershed lies over siltstone and mudstone. The northernmost part of the watershed is on sandstone. The creek is not a limestone stream, however.

There are a number of soil series in the watershed of West Branch Briar Creek. The Holly Series, a silt loam, is found along the creek. The Zipp Series, which is also a silt loam, is also found in parts of the watershed, including the headwaters. The Alvira series is found at the creek's headwaters. The Alvira soils in this location have fewer large fragments and are less eroded than typical Alvira soils.

West Branch Briar Creek is approximately 15 feet (4.6 m) wide.

There are plains at the headwaters of West Branch Briar Creek. These are either flat or have a slight slope.

== Watershed ==
The watershed of West Branch Briar Creek has an area of 12.06 square miles. The sub-watershed of Fester Hollow has an area of 4.54 square miles and the sub-watershed of Cabin Run has an area of 0.73 square miles. The watershed of the main stem of West Branch Briar Creek has an area of 6.79 square miles.

== History ==
In the 1700s, the Van Campen, Aikman, and Salmon families lived on West Branch Briar Creek. The first mill in Briar Creek Township was built at the confluence of the creek with Briar Creek by William Rittenhouse in 1800.

Historically, the valley that West Branch Briar Creek flows through was one of the most fertile valleys in Columbia County.

The Fowlersville Covered Bridge, which was built in 1886, was one of the last covered bridges to be built in Columbia County. It spanned West Branch Briar Creek until it was moved to Briar Creek.

== Biology ==
West Branch Fishing Creek is stocked with fish. The creek is inhabited by minnows and may be inhabited by trout. The waters of the creek are approved trout waters.

== See also ==
- East Branch Briar Creek
- List of rivers of Pennsylvania
