= Fowlersville Covered Bridge =

- U.S. National Register of Historic Places
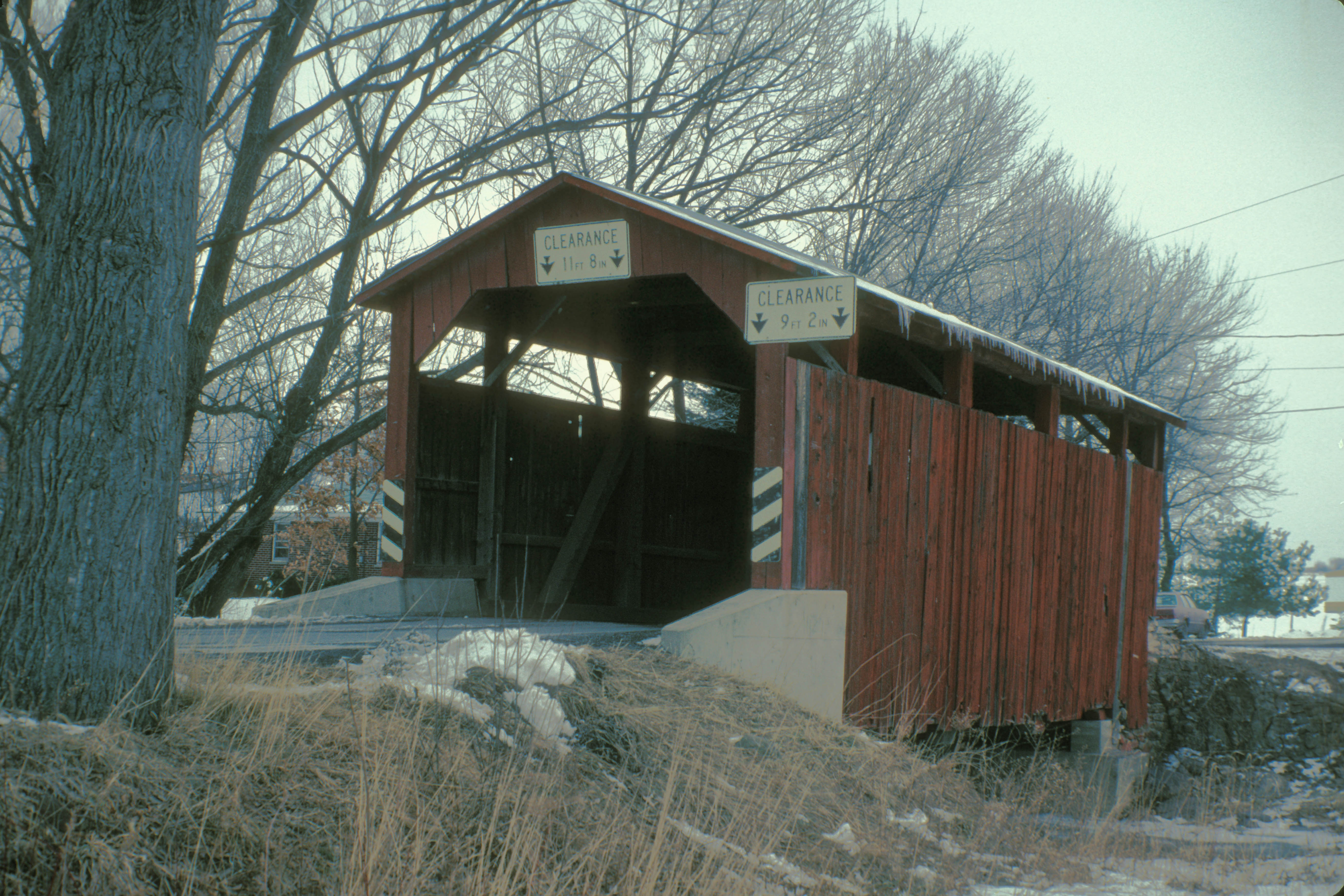
- The bridge at its original site over West Branch Briar Creek in 1982

- Location within Pennsylvania Location within the United States
- Location: Legislative Route 19039, south of Fowlersville, North Centre Township, Pennsylvania
- Coordinates: 41°3′19″N 76°19′39″W
- Area: 0.1 acres (0.040 ha)
- Built: 1886
- Built by: Charles King
- Architectural style: Queen Post design
- MPS: Covered Bridges of Columbia and Montour Counties TR
- NRHP reference No.: 79003182
- Added to NRHP: November 29, 1979

The Fowlersville Covered Bridge is a historic wooden covered bridge located in North Centre Township in Columbia County, Pennsylvania. It is a 40-foot-long (12 m) queen post truss bridge with board-and-batten siding constructed in 1886. It originally crossed West Branch Briar Creek. In 1986 the bridge was moved to Briar Creek Park in North Centre Township. Coordinates the bridge's current location appear at the end of the article. It is one of 28 historic covered bridges in Columbia and Montour Counties.

It was listed on the National Register of Historic Places in 1979. The coordinates above refer to the bridge's original location, its new location is 41°03′39″N 76°17′01″W.
