= Plumsteadville, Pennsylvania =

Unincorporated community in Pennsylvania, US

- Census-designated place
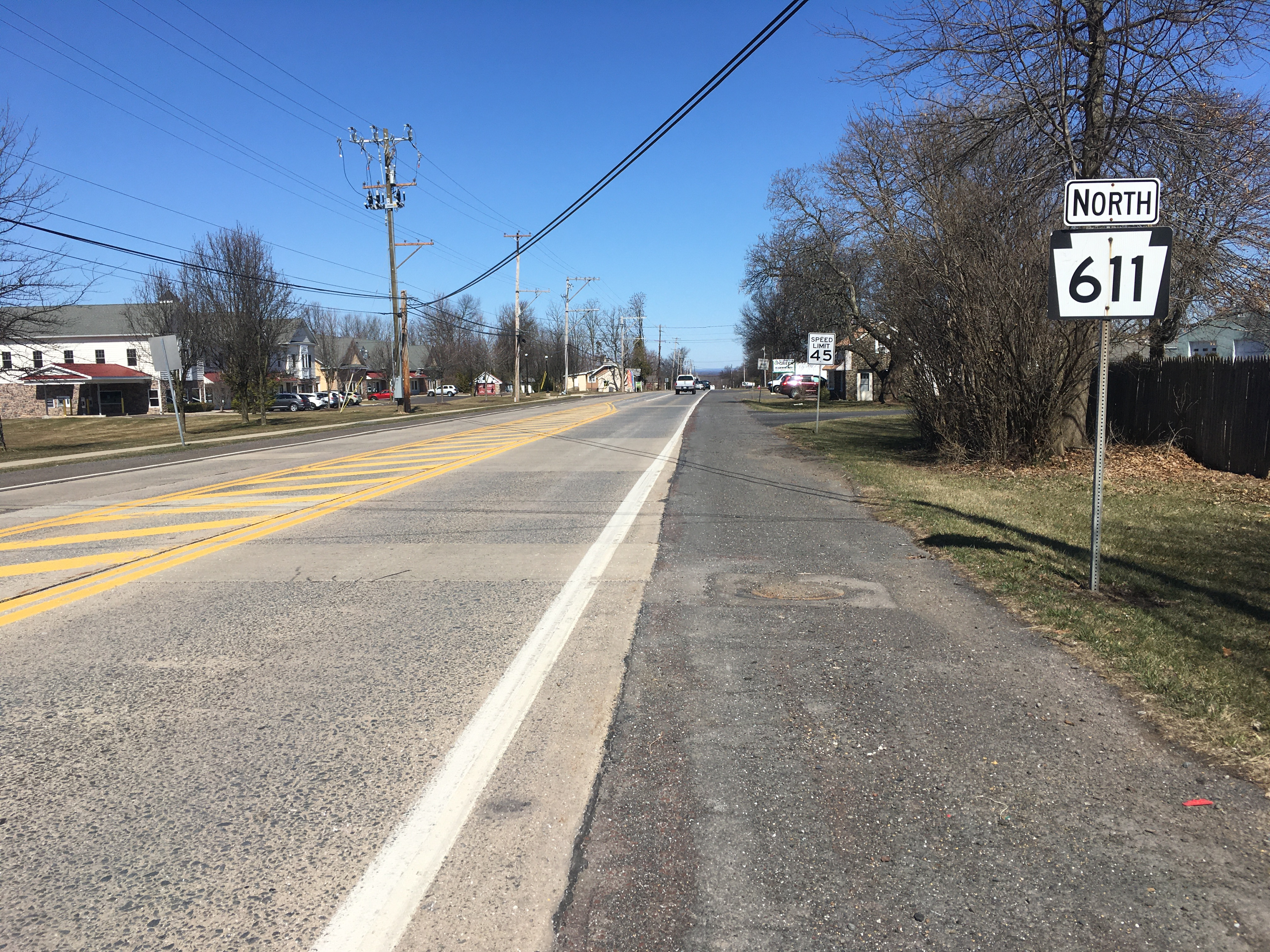
- PA 611 in Plumsteadville

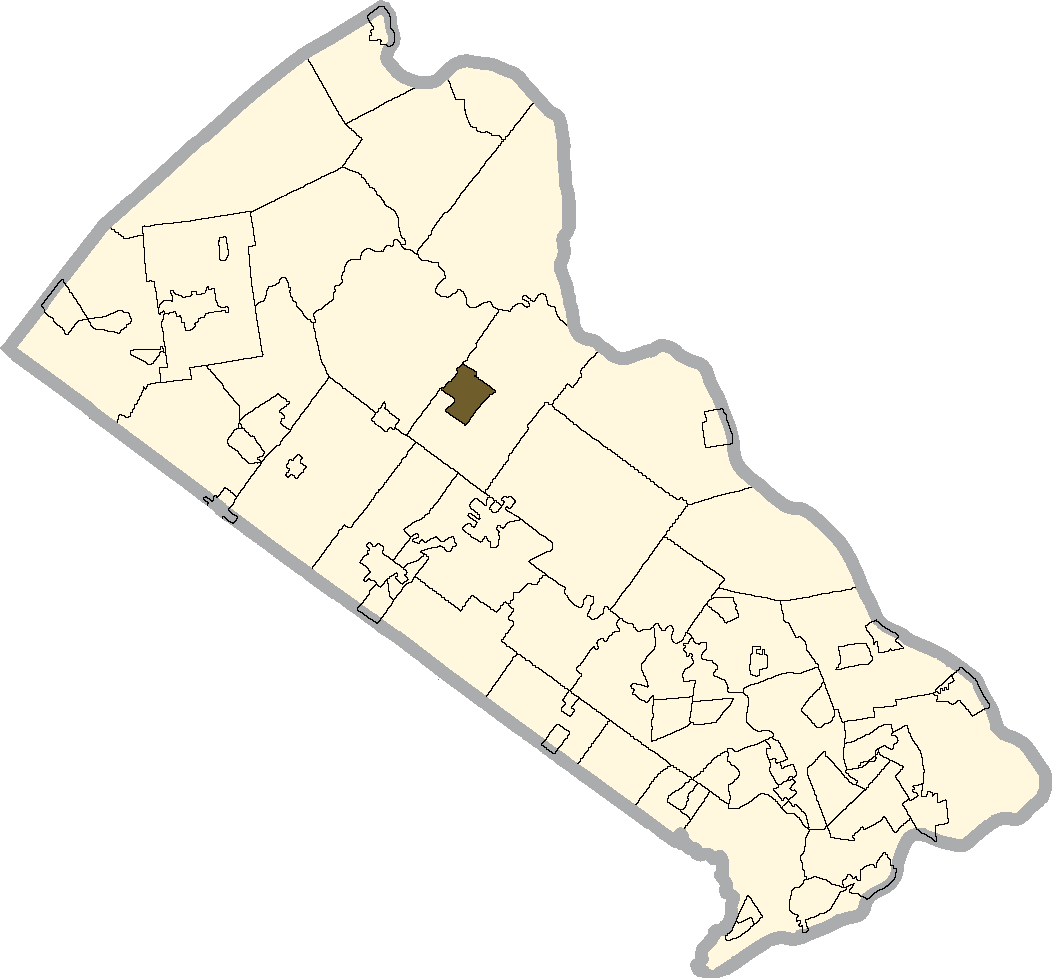
- Location of Plumsteadville in Bucks County

- Location of Plumsteadville in Pennsylvania and the United States Plumsteadville (the United States)
- Coordinates: 40°23′14″N 75°08′48″W
- Country: United States
- State: Pennsylvania
- County: Bucks
- Township: Plumstead

Area
  - Total: 2.39 sq mi (6.18 km^{2})
  - Land: 2.39 sq mi (6.18 km^{2})
  - Water: 0 sq mi (0.00 km^{2})

Population (2020)
  - Total: 2,553
  - Density: 1,070/sq mi (413/km^{2})
- Time zone: UTC-5 (Eastern (EST))
  - Summer (DST): UTC-4 (EDT)
- ZIP codes: 18949
- Area codes: 215, 267, and 445
- FIPS code: 42-61624

Plumsteadville is a census-designated place in Plumstead Township, Pennsylvania, United States. It is located along Pennsylvania Route 611, approximately eight miles north of Doylestown. As of the 2010 census, the population was 2,637 residents.

== Demographics ==
Historical population
Census	Pop.	Note	%±
2020	2,553		—
U.S. Decennial Census

== Community ==
The local school district is Central Bucks and children attend Groveland Elementary School. Plumsteadville also has plenty of access to outdoor activities. These activities include a bike ride to Tinicum Park, rock climbing at High Rocks and hiking. Neighborhoods in the area are conducive to groups of children gathering for playtime activities.

The Plumsteadville Village Business Alliance was recently launched in May 2016 to organize and start working together with local businesses towards developing future business growth and strong community alliances with their neighbors. In turn, their efforts will build more commerce which will enhance the growth of their businesses, will work towards building the vital local economy and will help local entrepreneurs compete successfully.

== Notable person ==
- Alfred J. Sellers (1836-1908), Medal of Honor recipient
