= North Centre Township, Pennsylvania =

Township in Pennsylvania, US

Coordinates: 41°03′00″N 76°22′35″W

- Township
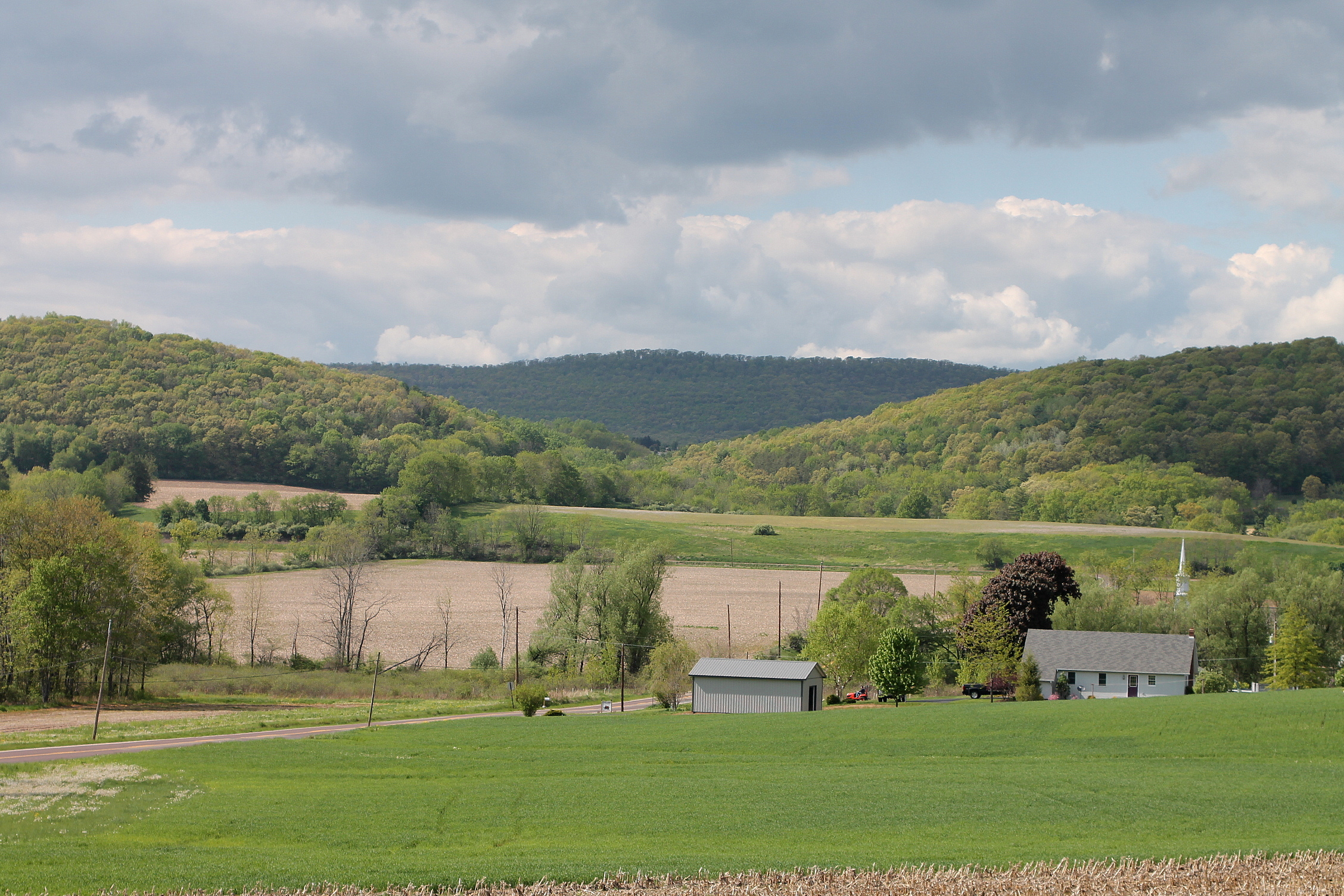
- Summer Hill in North Centre Township with a gap showing Knob Mountain beyond

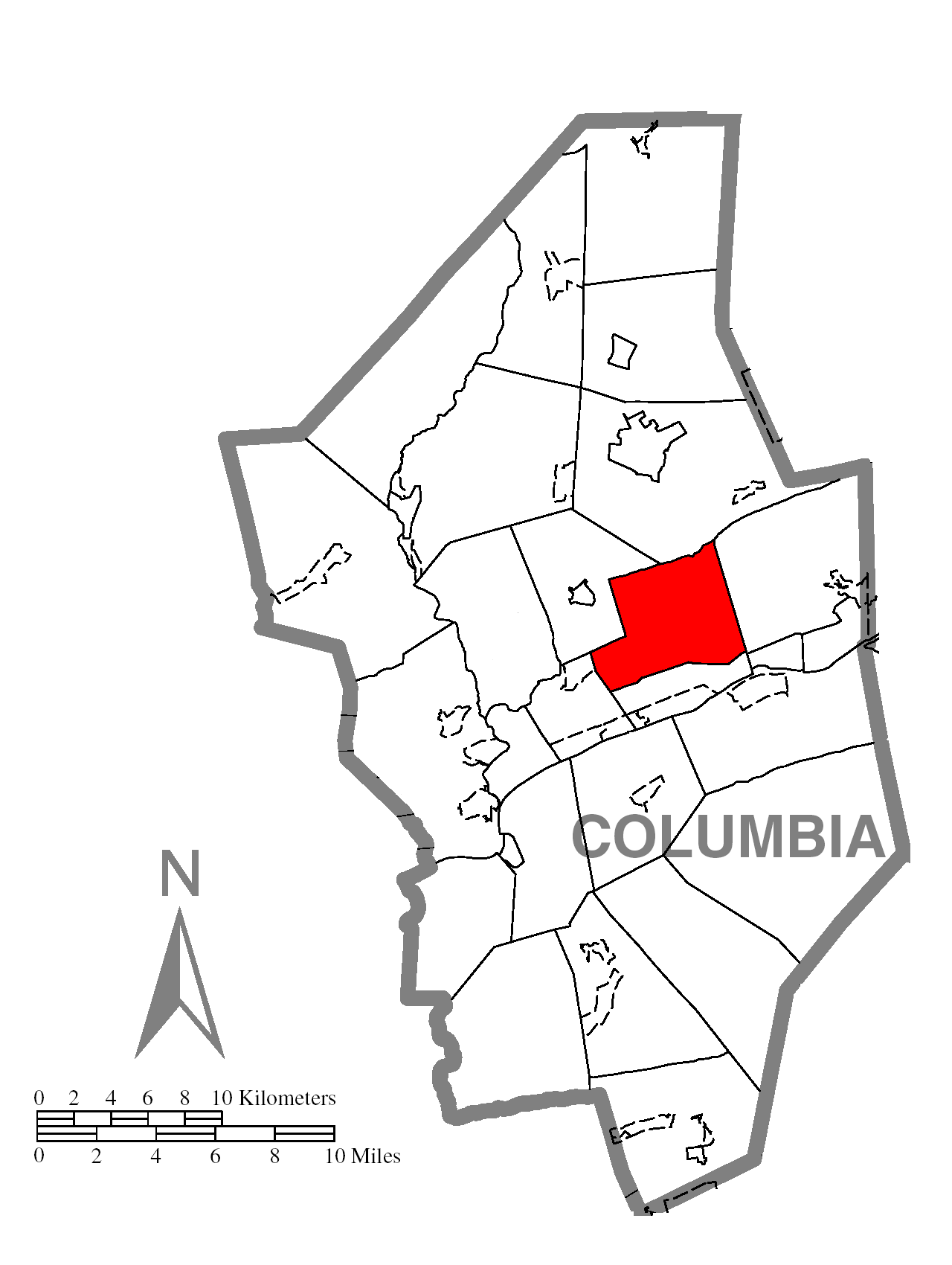
- Map of Columbia County, Pennsylvania highlighting North Centre Township

- Map of Columbia County, Pennsylvania
- Country: United States
- State: Pennsylvania
- County: Columbia
- Settled: 1771
- Incorporated: 1923

Area
  - Total: 15.00 sq mi (38.86 km^{2})
  - Land: 14.96 sq mi (38.75 km^{2})
  - Water: 0.046 sq mi (0.12 km^{2})

Population (2020)
  - Total: 2,039 ▼
  - Estimate (2021): 2,060
  - Density: 141.1/sq mi (54.48/km^{2})
- Time zone: UTC-5 (Eastern (EST))
  - Summer (DST): UTC-4 (EDT)
- Area code: 570
- FIPS code: 42-037-54880
- Website: www.northcentretownship.com

North Centre Township is a township in Columbia County, Pennsylvania. It is part of Northeastern Pennsylvania. The population was 2,039 at the 2020 census.

== History ==
The Fowlersville Covered Bridge was listed on the National Register of Historic Places in 1979.

== Geography ==
The township is located slightly northeast of the center of Columbia County. Knob Mountain forms the northern boundary. Unincorporated communities include North Centre in the northwestern part of the township, The Kingdom of Fowlersville and Dennis Mills in the east. According to the United States Census Bureau, the township has a total area of 15.0 square miles (38.9 km^{2}), of which 0.04 square miles (0.1 km^{2}), or 0.30%, is water.

== Demographics ==
Historical population
Census	Pop.	Note	%±
2010	2,105		—
2020	2,039		−3.1%
2021 (est.)	2,060		1.0%

As of the census of 2000, there were 2,009 people, 735 households, and 580 families residing in the township. The population density was 130.7 inhabitants per square mile (50.5/km^{2}). There were 792 housing units at an average density of 51.5 per square mile (19.9/km^{2}). The racial makeup of the township was 98.26% White, 0.85% African American, 0.05% Native American, 0.25% Asian, 0.10% Pacific Islander, 0.25% from other races, and 0.25% from two or more races. Hispanic or Latino of any race were 1.14% of the population.

There were 735 households, out of which 36.7% had children under the age of 18 living with them, 67.1% were married couples living together, 7.9% had a female householder with no husband present, and 21.0% were non-families. 16.5% of all households were made up of individuals, and 5.7% had someone living alone who was 65 years of age or older. The average household size was 2.73 and the average family size was 3.05.

In the township the population was spread out, with 26.9% under the age of 18, 6.2% from 18 to 24, 30.5% from 25 to 44, 26.0% from 45 to 64, and 10.5% who were 65 years of age or older. The median age was 38 years. For every 100 females, there were 98.9 males. For every 100 females age 18 and over, there were 95.9 males.

The median income for a household in the township was $42,716, and the median income for a family was $48,229. Males had a median income of $34,850 versus $21,439 for females. The per capita income for the township was $20,010. About 4.3% of families and 6.7% of the population were below the poverty line, including 10.4% of those under age 18 and 8.1% of those age 65 or over.

== Education ==
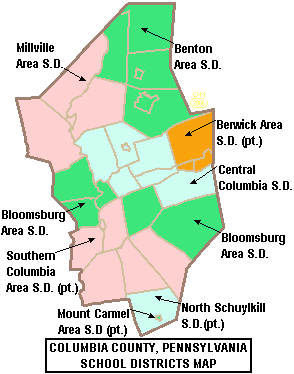
Map of Columbia County, Pennsylvania School Districts, with Central Columbia School District in blue in the center of the county.

The area's local school district is the Central Columbia School District. It serves about 2,100 students and features three academic buildings and one administration building. Students are divided into the Elementary School (grades K through 4), Middle School (grades 5 through 8) and the Central Columbia High School (grades 9 through 12).

According to the 2003 data collected by Standard & Poor's, 18.4% of students are economically disadvantaged, 13.1% receive special education services and 71.1% of students pass the state-mandated testing. The district spends about $6,999 per student.

In 2007, the Pittsburgh Business Times ranked the district 146th out of 499 Pennsylvania school districts based on three years of Pennsylvania System of Student Assessment test scores.

The Middle School is under construction, as of 2006. Several small additions are being added to accommodate the increasing class size, and a major renovation on the existing portion will bring it up to code. It's expected to be near completion by the beginning of the 2007–2008 school year.
