= Plumstead Township, Pennsylvania =

Township in Pennsylvania, US

- Township
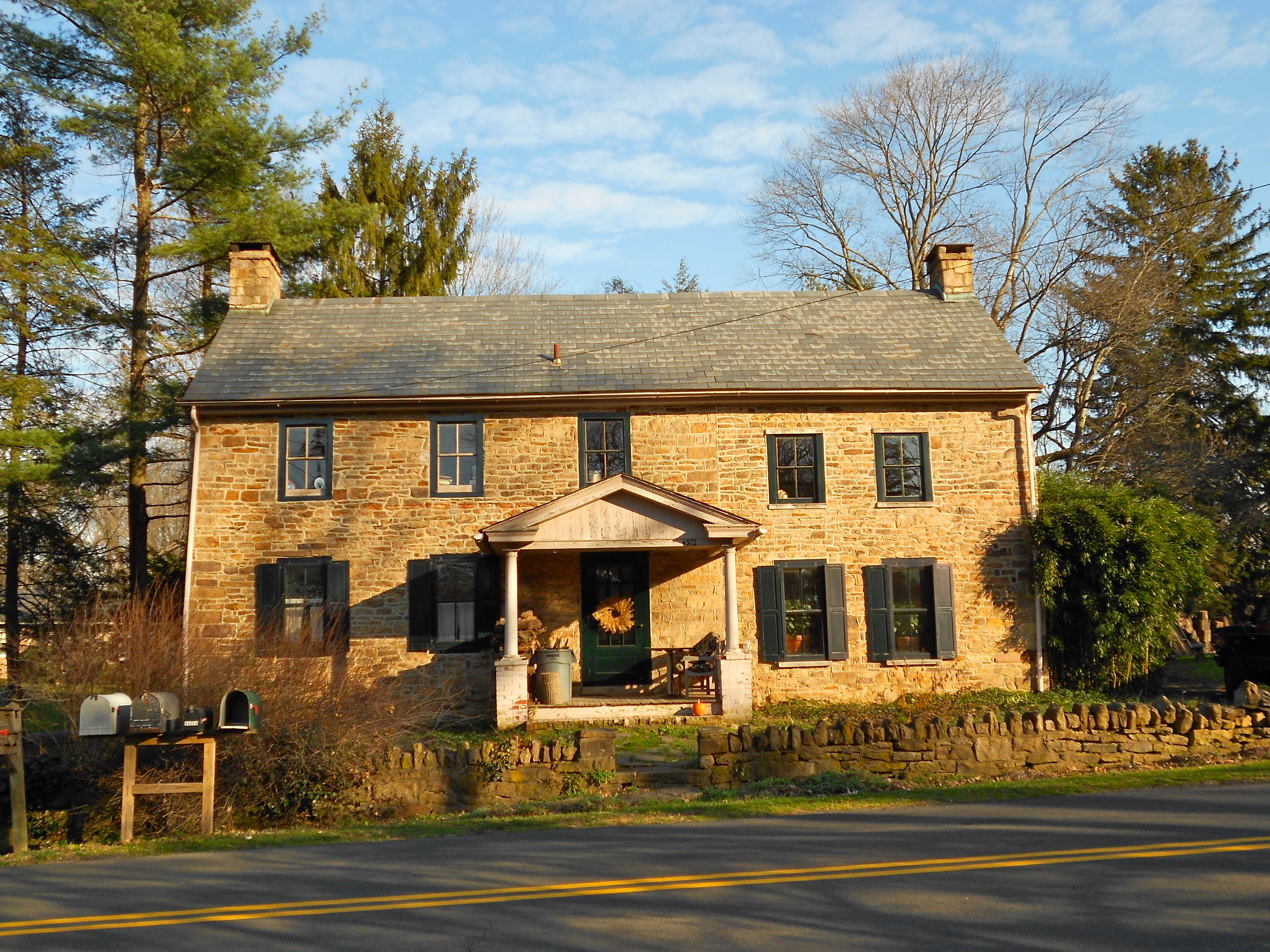
- House in the Dyerstown Historic District

- Seal

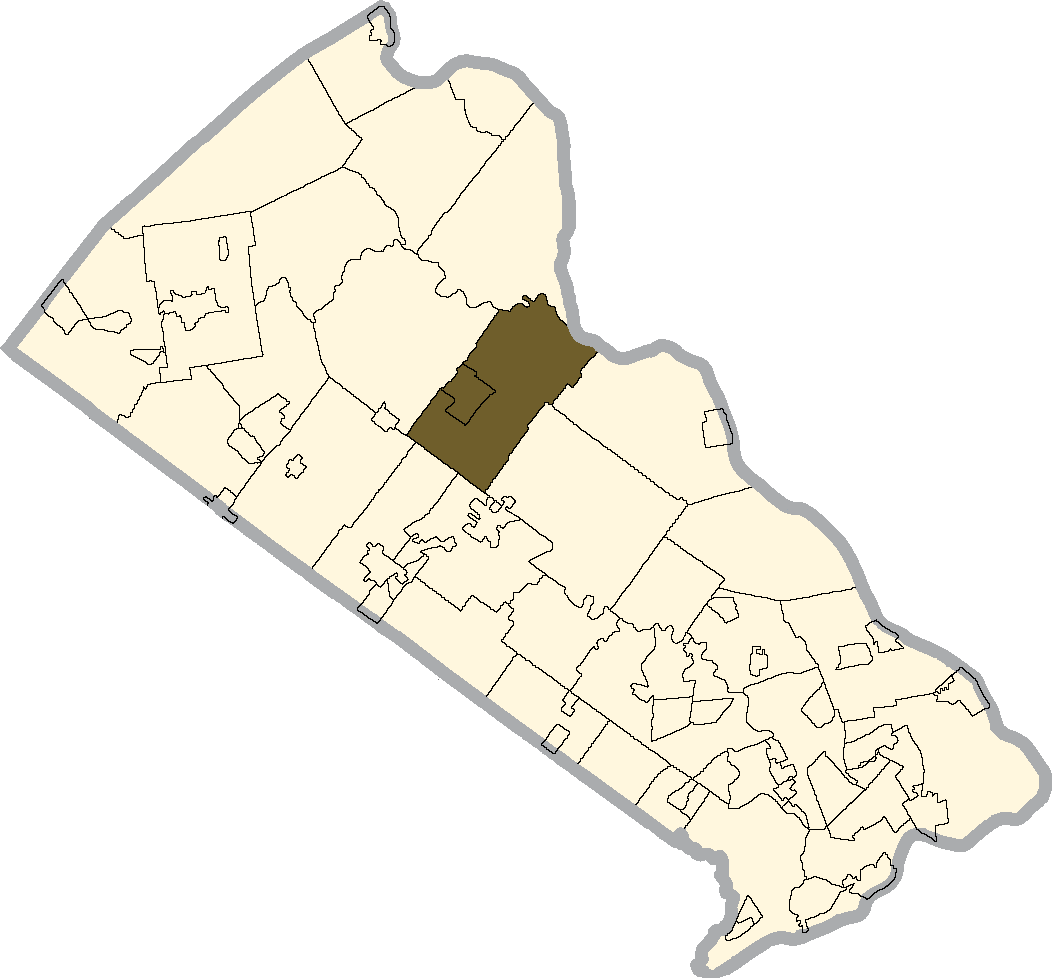
- Location of Plumstead Township in Bucks County

- Location in Pennsylvania and the United States Plumstead Township (the United States)
- Coordinates: 40°23′00″N 75°06′59″W
- Country: United States
- State: Pennsylvania
- County: Bucks

Area
  - Total: 27.28 sq mi (70.7 km^{2})
  - Land: 27.16 sq mi (70.3 km^{2})
  - Water: 0.12 sq mi (0.31 km^{2})
- Elevation: 394 ft (120 m)

Population (2020)
  - Total: 14,021
  - Density: 516.2/sq mi (199.3/km^{2})
- Time zone: UTC-5 (EST)
  - Summer (DST): UTC-4 (EDT)
- Area codes: 215, 267 and 445
- FIPS code: 42-017-61616
- Website: www.plumstead.org

Plumstead Township is a township in Bucks County, Pennsylvania, United States. The population was 14,021 at the 2020 census.

== History ==
The township was settled in the early 18th Century by Quakers pursuing religious freedom. By 1725, a formal petition was presented to Bucks County to recognize the area as Plumstead Township. The Doan Outlaws notoriously were raised in Plumstead and participated in criminal activity throughout the American Revolutionary War.

The Gardenville-North Branch Rural Historic District, Dyerstown Historic District, and Loux Covered Bridge are listed on the National Register of Historic Places.

== Geography ==
According to the United States Census Bureau, the township has a total area of 27.2 square miles (70.5 km^{2}), of which 27.2 square miles (70.3 km^{2}) is land and 0.1 square mile (0.1 km^{2}) (0.18%) is water. It is drained by the Delaware River, which separates it from New Jersey. Past and present villages include Carversville (also in Solebury Township), Cross Keys (also in Doylestown Township), Curley Hill, Danboro, Dyerstown, Fountainville, Gardenville, Griers Corner (also in Bedminster and Hilltown Townships), Groveland, Hinkletown, Kendigtown, Keplers Corner, Landisville, Lower Black Eddy, Lumberville, Melchers Corner, Plumsteadville, Point Pleasant (also in Tinicum Township), Smiths Corner, Smithtown, and Wismer.

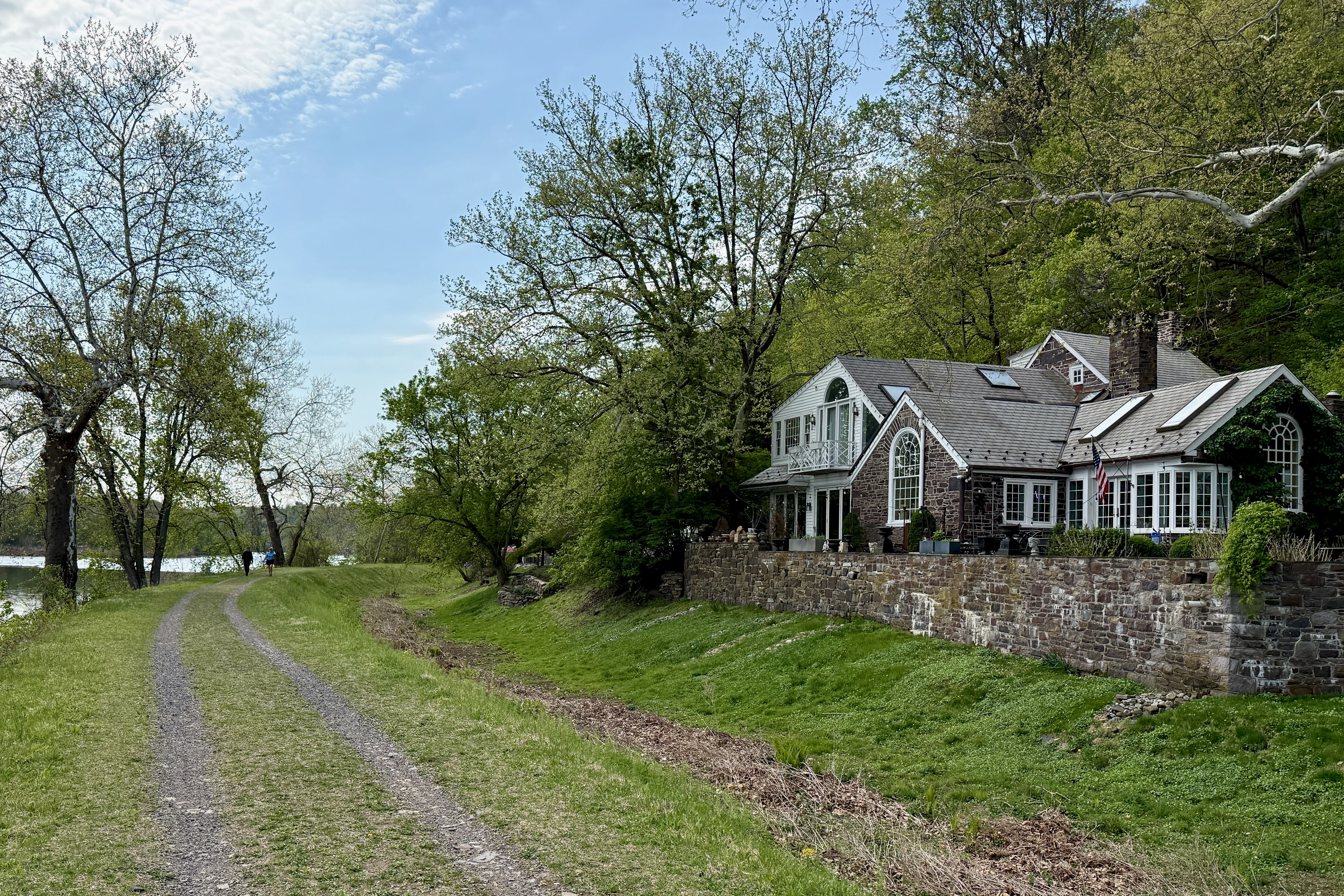
Devil's Half Acre along the Delaware Canal

An area of the township, including a stone house, along the Delaware Canal was known historically as the Devil's Half Acre.

Ralph Stover State Park is located in Plumstead Township and Tinicum Township.

Natural features include Cabin Run, Curley Hill, Geddes Run, Hickory Run, Irish Run, Moss Giel Rock, Slobbery Run, and Tohickon Creek.

=== Neighboring municipalities ===
- Solebury Township (east)
- Buckingham Township (southeast)
- Doylestown Township (south)
- New Britain Township (southwest)
- Hilltown Township (southwest)
- Bedminster Township (northwest)
- Tinicum Township (north)
- Kingwood Township, New Jersey (northeast)

== Demographics ==
Historical population
| Census | Pop. | Note | %± |
|---|---|---|---|
| 1930 | 2,080 | | — |
| 1940 | 2,168 | | 4.2% |
| 1950 | 2,353 | | 8.5% |
| 1960 | 3,354 | | 42.5% |
| 1970 | 4,682 | | 39.6% |
| 1980 | 5,153 | | 10.1% |
| 1990 | 6,289 | | 22.0% |
| 2000 | 11,409 | | 81.4% |
| 2010 | 12,442 | | 9.1% |
| 2020 | 14,021 | | 12.7% |

As of the 2010 census, the township was 94.1% White, 0.7% Black or African American, 0.1% Native American, 1.7% Asian, and 1.4% were two or more races. 4.7% of the population were of Hispanic or Latino ancestry.

As of the census of 2000, there were 11,409 people, 3,938 households, and 3,130 families residing in the township. The population density was 420.1 inhabitants per square mile (162.2/km^{2}). There were 4,103 housing units at an average density of 151.1 units per square mile (58.3 units/km^{2}). The racial makeup of the township was 96.36% White, 0.71% African American, 0.28% Native American, 1.01% Asian, 0.01% Pacific Islander, 0.85% from other races, and 0.78% from two or more races. Hispanic or Latino of any race were 1.98% of the population.

There were 3,938 households, out of which 45.1% had children under the age of 18 living with them, 69.8% were married couples living together, 6.7% had a female householder with no husband present, and 20.5% were non-families. 15.6% of all households were made up of individuals, and 3.7% had someone living alone who was 65 years of age or older. The average household size was 2.89 and the average family size was 3.26.

In the township the population was spread out, with 30.9% under the age of 18, 4.9% from 18 to 24, 36.9% from 25 to 44, 20.8% from 45 to 64, and 6.5% who were 65 years of age or older. The median age was 34 years. For every 100 females, there were 101.0 males. For every 100 females age 18 and over, there were 98.4 males.

The median income for a household in the township was $70,332, and the median income for a family was $80,946. Males had a median income of $56,263 versus $33,633 for females. The per capita income for the township was $29,411. About 2.1% of families and 2.5% of the population were below the poverty line, including 1.8% of those under age 18 and 4.0% of those age 65 or over.

== Climate ==
According to the Köppen climate classification system, Plumstead Township, Pennsylvania has a hot-summer, wet all year, humid continental climate (Dfa). Dfa climates are characterized by at least one month having an average mean temperature ≤ 32.0 °F (≤ 0.0 °C), at least four months with an average mean temperature ≥ 50.0 °F (≥ 10.0 °C), at least one month with an average mean temperature ≥ 71.6 °F (≥ 22.0 °C), and no significant precipitation difference between seasons. During the summer months, episodes of extreme heat and humidity can occur with heat index values ≥ 100 °F (≥ 38 °C). On average, the wettest month of the year is July which corresponds with the annual peak in thunderstorm activity. During the winter months, episodes of extreme cold and wind can occur with wind chill values < 0 °F (< -18 °C). The plant hardiness zone is 6b with an average annual extreme minimum air temperature of −2.7 °F (−19.3 °C). The average seasonal (Nov-Apr) snowfall total is between 30 and 36 inches (76 and 91 centimetres), and the average snowiest month is February which corresponds with the annual peak in nor'easter activity.

Climate data for Plumstead Township, Bucks County, Pennsylvania (1981 – 2010 averages)
| Month | Jan | Feb | Mar | Apr | May | Jun | Jul | Aug | Sep | Oct | Nov | Dec | Year |
|---|---|---|---|---|---|---|---|---|---|---|---|---|---|
| Mean daily maximum °F (°C) | 38.1 (3.4) | 41.5 (5.3) | 49.9 (9.9) | 62.0 (16.7) | 71.9 (22.2) | 80.6 (27.0) | 84.8 (29.3) | 83.0 (28.3) | 76.1 (24.5) | 64.8 (18.2) | 53.8 (12.1) | 42.4 (5.8) | 62.5 (16.9) |
| Daily mean °F (°C) | 29.4 (−1.4) | 32.2 (0.1) | 39.8 (4.3) | 50.7 (10.4) | 60.4 (15.8) | 69.6 (20.9) | 74.1 (23.4) | 72.5 (22.5) | 65.1 (18.4) | 53.6 (12.0) | 43.9 (6.6) | 33.9 (1.1) | 52.2 (11.2) |
| Mean daily minimum °F (°C) | 20.7 (−6.3) | 22.9 (−5.1) | 29.7 (−1.3) | 39.4 (4.1) | 49.0 (9.4) | 58.6 (14.8) | 63.4 (17.4) | 62.0 (16.7) | 54.2 (12.3) | 42.4 (5.8) | 34.0 (1.1) | 25.5 (−3.6) | 41.9 (5.5) |
| Average precipitation inches (mm) | 3.38 (86) | 2.74 (70) | 3.84 (98) | 4.05 (103) | 4.33 (110) | 4.37 (111) | 5.03 (128) | 4.04 (103) | 4.50 (114) | 4.26 (108) | 3.72 (94) | 4.01 (102) | 48.27 (1,226) |
| Average relative humidity (%) | 67.9 | 64.3 | 59.9 | 58.8 | 63.4 | 68.8 | 68.3 | 71.1 | 72.7 | 70.9 | 69.9 | 69.6 | 67.1 |
| Average dew point °F (°C) | 20.1 (−6.6) | 21.5 (−5.8) | 27.0 (−2.8) | 36.8 (2.7) | 47.9 (8.8) | 58.9 (14.9) | 63.0 (17.2) | 62.6 (17.0) | 56.1 (13.4) | 44.4 (6.9) | 34.7 (1.5) | 25.0 (−3.9) | 41.6 (5.3) |
Source: PRISM Climate Group

== Transportation ==
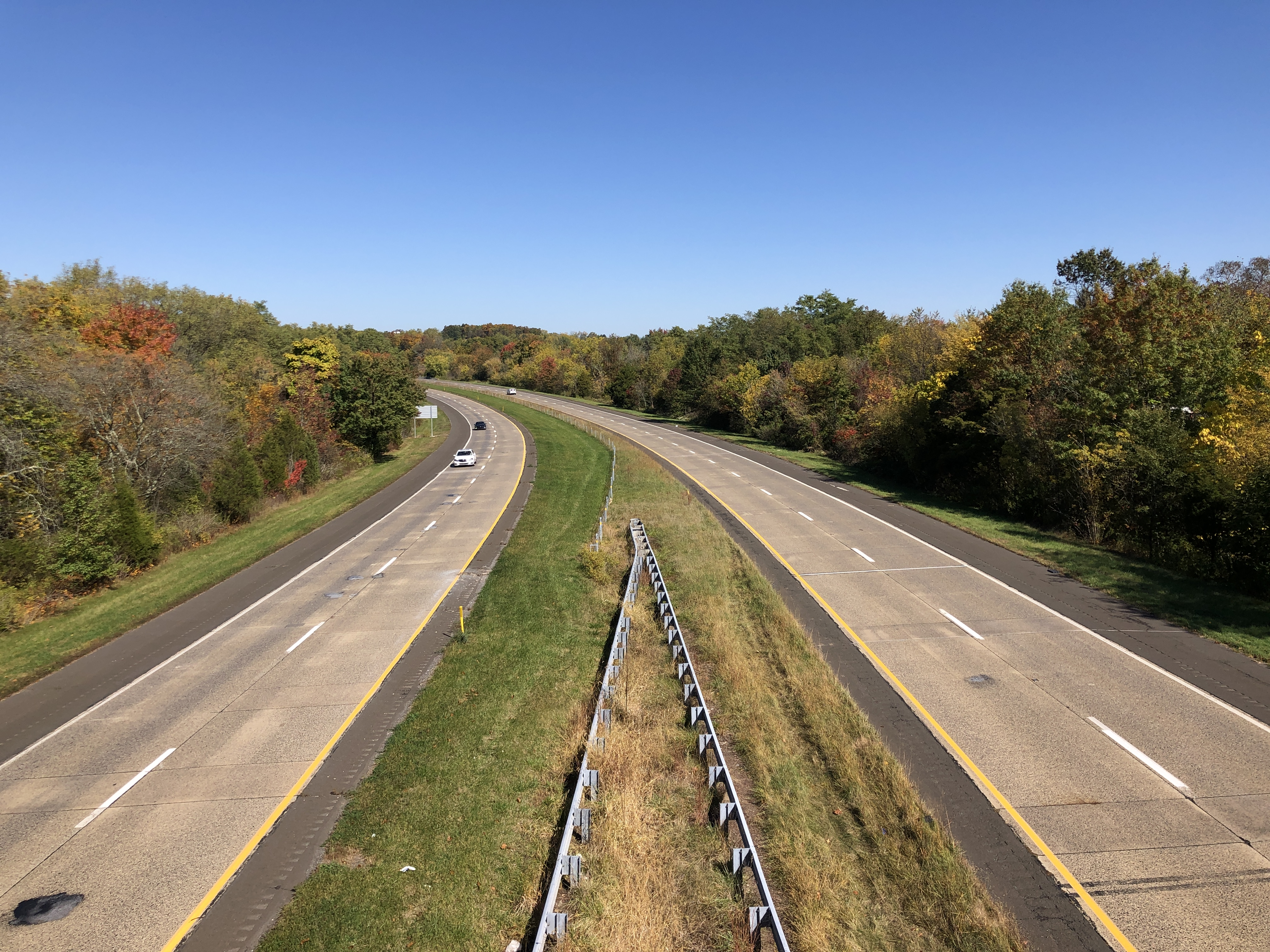
PA 611 northbound in Plumstead Township

As of 2018 there were 111.72 miles (179.80 km) of public roads in Plumstead Township, of which 41.24 miles (66.37 km) were maintained by the Pennsylvania Department of Transportation (PennDOT) and 70.48 miles (113.43 km) were maintained by the township.

Pennsylvania Route 611 is the most prominent highway serving Plumstead Township. PA 611 follows a generally south–north alignment through the southwestern portion of the township, entering from the south via the Doylestown Bypass and exiting northward via Easton Road. Other state highways serving the township include Pennsylvania Route 32, Pennsylvania Route 313 and Pennsylvania Route 413. PA 32 follows River Road along a northwest–southeast alignment parallel to the Delaware River in the northeastern section of the township. PA 313 utilizes Swamp Road along a southeast-to-northwest alignment along the southwestern edge of the township. Finally, PA 413 follows Durham Road along a southeast-to-northwest alignment through the middle of the township.

SEPTA provides bus service to the Cross Keys Place shopping center in the southern portion of Plumstead Township along the SEPTA City Bus Route 55 line, which heads south from there to Doylestown, Willow Grove, and Olney Transportation Center in North Philadelphia. Bucks County Transport operates the Doylestown DART bus which serves the Cross Keys Place shopping center and provides service into Doylestown.

== Ecology ==
According to the A. W. Kuchler U.S. potential natural vegetation types, Plumstead Township, Pennsylvania would have an Appalachian Oak (104) vegetation type with an Eastern Hardwood Forest (25) vegetation form.

== Culture ==
Starting in the first weekend in June, the Plumsteadville Grange Farm Market hosts local vendors with fresh produce, baked treats, and handmade goods. The market closes for the winter in the last weekend of October.

== Notable people ==
- Doan Outlaws
