= Palisades School District =

School district in Pennsylvania

Address
- 39 Thomas Free Drive Kintnersville, Pennsylvania, 18930; United States

District information
- Type: Public
- Grades: K–12
- NCES District ID: 4218330

Students and staff
- Students: 1,404 (2020–2021)
- Teachers: 148.08 (on an FTE basis)
- Staff: 174.0 (on an FTE basis)
- Student–teacher ratio: 9.48:1

Other information
- Website: www.palisd.org

Palisades School District is a public school district located in Bucks County, Pennsylvania, United States. It serves Bridgeton, Durham, Nockamixon, Springfield, and Tinicum Townships. On July 1, 2013, the borough of Riegelsville transferred from the Easton Area School District to Palisades School District.

== Location ==
The Palisades School District is located in approximately 100 square miles of upper Bucks County, Pennsylvania, and is immediately connected to the Delaware River. The Palisades School District comprises the municipalities of Bridgeton, Durham, Nockamixon, Springfield and Tinicum Townships, and Riegelsville Borough.

== History ==
In 1945 Durham Township agreed to form a joint school board with Springfield Township School District. From that time the high school students of this township became students of the Springfield-Durham High School.

When in 1945 Bridgeton Township planned to close its one room schools, the board decided to send its seventh and eighth grade students to the Nockamixon High School and to form a jointure with that township board.

Following the 1945 session of the General Assembly of Pennsylvania, the school districts of Upper Bucks County agreed to form joint school boards to cut down the excessive cost to taxpayers of operating schools as single districts, and to provide the greater benefits to all that such a jointure would make possible.

The townships of Tinicum, Springfield, Durham, Nockamixon and Bridgeton entered into discussion of a jointure plan in 1948 the four districts of Bridgeton, Durham, Springfield and Tinicum organized the Palisades Joint School Board, and in 1950, Nockamixon Township entered into the plan.

In 1975, the district proposed building a new Palisades Middle School, originally proposed to house grades 5th through 7th. The middle school would not be built until sixteen years later in 1991, housing grades 6th through 8th.

Circa 2006, a campaign to move Riegelsville from the Easton Area School District to the Palisades School District began. In 2011, Ronald J. Tomalis, the Secretary of Education of Pennsylvania, ruled in favor of the Riegelsville Tax and Education Coalition by stating that the group's request is related to education quality. The previous secretary had ruled against the group. Clyde Waite, a judge in Bucks County approved the plan in 2012. Riegelsville was to be an independent school district for a period between it being part of two different school districts. The Pennsylvania Department of Education approved the moving of districts in July 2012. The change was to be effective in 2013. Around 60 students were to be moved to the Palisades district. To cover the student transfer, the Palisades district gave $1,400,000 to the Easton Area School District.

== Schools ==
=== Elementary schools ===
- Durham Nockamixon Elementary School- Opened in 1981. Replaced the old Nockamixon School on Route 611 in Revere and the old Durham School on Durham Road in Durham.
- Springfield Elementary School- Opened in 1914 as Springfield High School, later known as Springfield-Durham High School. Became an elementary school in 1953, with expansions in 1962 and 1980.
- Tinicum Elementary School - Opened in 1958. Extensive renovations to this school were completed in 2012. A new wing was added to the school and an upgraded HVAC systems utilizing Geothermal technology was added to the entire school.

=== Middle schools ===
- Palisades Middle School- Opened in 1991.

=== High schools ===
- Palisades High School- Opened in 1953. Replaced the former Springfield-Durham High School and Nockamixon Township High School.. The school underwent an extensive renovation in 2004.

== Areas served ==
- Bridgeton Township
  - Upper Black Eddy
- Durham Township
  - Monroe
- Nockamixon Township
- Riegelsville
- Springfield Township
  - Pleasant Valley
  - Springtown
- Tinicum Township
  - Erwinna
  - Ottsville
