= Springtown Historic District =

Historic district in Pennsylvania, United States

- U.S. National Register of Historic Places
- U.S. Historic district
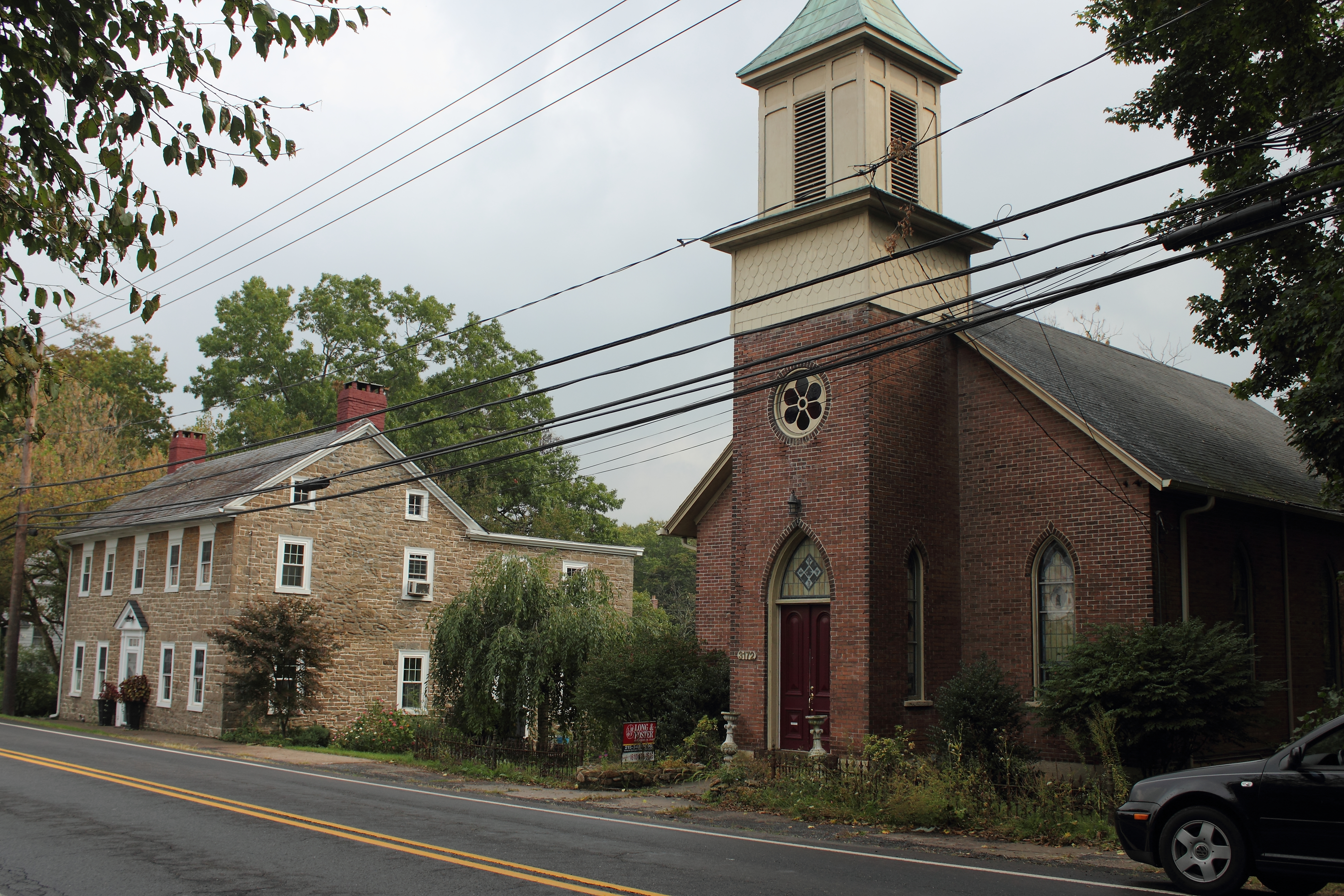
- Springtown Historic District, September 2012

- Location within Pennsylvania Location within the United States
- Location: Main St. between Drifting Dr. & Springtown Hill Rd., Springtown, Springfield Township, Pennsylvania
- Coordinates: 40°33′24″N 75°17′16″W
- Area: 161.5 acres (65.4 ha)
- Architectural style: Georgian, Federal, et al.
- NRHP reference No.: 07001379
- Added to NRHP: January 10, 2008

The Springtown Historic District is a national historic district that is located in Springtown, Springfield Township, Bucks County, Pennsylvania.

It was added to the National Register of Historic Places in 2007.

== History and architectural features ==
This district includes 143 contributing buildings and one contributing structure that are located in the rural village of Springtown and its surrounding area. They include a variety of residential, commercial, and institutional buildings that were built between 1738 and 1956. The buildings include modest Georgian and Federal-style residences.

Notable buildings include the Conrad Hess Mansion House (c. 1807), the White Horse Tavern, the Sarah the Dean Tenant House, the Kooker-Eakin Farm, the Springtown Inn (c. 1830), the S.G. Mills General Store, Salem United Methodist Church (1842, 1868), Christ Evangelical Lutheran Church (1872), Grace Church (1888), and the Franklin Grange Building (c. 1892). Also located within the district is the separately listed John Eakin Farm (1738).
