= Amity, Bucks County, Pennsylvania =

Unincorporated community in Pennsylvania, US

Amity
- Unincorporated community
- Location of Amity in Bucks County, Pennsylvania Amity (the United States)
- Coordinates: 40°30′33″N 75°17′10″W
- Country: United States
- State: Pennsylvania
- County: Bucks
- Township: Springfield
- Elevation: 479 ft (146 m)
- Time zone: UTC-5 (EST)
  - Summer (DST): UTC-4 (EDT)
- ZIP code: 18951
- Area codes: 215, 267, 445

Amity is an unincorporated community located in Springfield Township, Bucks County, Pennsylvania, United States.

== Geography ==
Amity is located at the intersection of Old Bethlehem Road and Round House Road at coordinates 40°30′33″N 75°17′10″W in Springfield Township, just south of Pleasant Valley. The summit of Molasses Hill (elevation 495 feet (151 m) is located approximately 0.79 miles (1.27 km) to the southwest of Amity.

Amity's zip code is 18951, mail is delivered by the Quakertown post office, telephone service area codes are 215, 267 and 445.

== Geology ==
Amity falls within the watershed of a tributary of Cooks Creek, part of the Delaware River watershed, at an elevation of 479 feet (146 m), and it lies within the Brunswick Formation, bedrock laid down during the Triassic, consisting of mudstone, shale and siltstone.
