= Hollow Run (Cooks Creek tributary) =

- Hollow Run

Location
- Country: United States
- State: Pennsylvania
- County: Bucks
- Township: Durham

Physical characteristics
- Source
  - coordinates: 40°32′50″N 75°13′44″W
  - elevation: 618 feet (188 m)
- Mouth
  - coordinates: 40°34′27″N 75°13′42″W
  - elevation: 203 feet (62 m)
- Length: 2.18 miles (3.51 km)

Basin features
- Progression: Hollow Run → Cooks Creek → Delaware River → Delaware Bay
- River system: Delaware River
- Bridges: Gallows Hill Road, Lehnenberg Road, Pennsylvania Route 212 (Durham Road), Old Philadelphia Road

Hollow Run is a tributary of Cooks Creek which is located in Durham Township, Bucks County, Pennsylvania in the United States.

== Statistics ==
Hollow Run was entered into the Geographic Names Information System of the U.S. Geological Survey on 30 August 1990 as identification number 1196191. It is contained wholly within Durham Township.

It rises at an elevation of 618 feet (188 m) and meets its confluence with Cooks Creek at an elevation of 203 feet (62 m). The length of the stream is 2.18 miles (3.51 km), and has an average slope of 190 feet per mile (35.9 meters per kilometer).

== Course ==
Hollow Run rises on the eastern slope of Buckwampum Hill oriented north for a short distance. It then turns to the northeast then curves back around to the north. At river mile 1.43 it receives a tributary from the left and abruptly turns again to the northeast.

At river mile 1.25 it passes through a pond or dammed reservoir. Shortly after it leaves the pond, it picks up a tributary from the right at river mile 1.05, then flows generally north to its confluence at Cooks Creek's 2.42 river mile.

== Geology ==
Buckwampum Hill is part of the Quartz Fanglomerate formation, from the Jurassic and Triassic, which is a coarse conglomerate of rounded cobbles and boulders. Mineralogy consists of quartzite, sandstone, quartz, and metarhyolite in red sand.

As Hollow Run flows northward, it then runs into a Hornblende and Gneiss formation, from the Precambrian, which also consists of labradorite.

As it approaches Cooks Creek it flows into the Hardyston Formation, from the Cambrian period, consisting of quartzite and feldpathic sandstone and has some quartz pebble conglomerate and is somewhat porous and limonitic.

== Crossings and Bridges ==
Crossings and bridges for this tributary are:

- Gallows Hill Road
- Lehnenberg Road
- Pennsylvania Route 212 (Durham Road)
- Old Philadelphia Road
