= Durham, Pennsylvania =

Unincorporated community in Pennsylvania, US

- Unincorporated community
- Location within Pennsylvania
- Coordinates: 40°34′32″N 75°13′24″W
- Country: United States
- State: Pennsylvania
- County: Bucks
- Township: Durham
- Elevation: 233 ft (71 m)
- Time zone: UTC-5 (Eastern (EST))
  - Summer (DST): UTC-4 (EDT)
- ZIP Code: 18039
- Area codes: 610 and 484
- GNIS feature ID: 1173637

Durham is an unincorporated community in Durham Township in Bucks County, Pennsylvania, United States. Durham is located at the intersection of Pennsylvania Route 212 and Durham Road.
