= Palisades High School (Pennsylvania) =

High school in Pennsylvania, United States

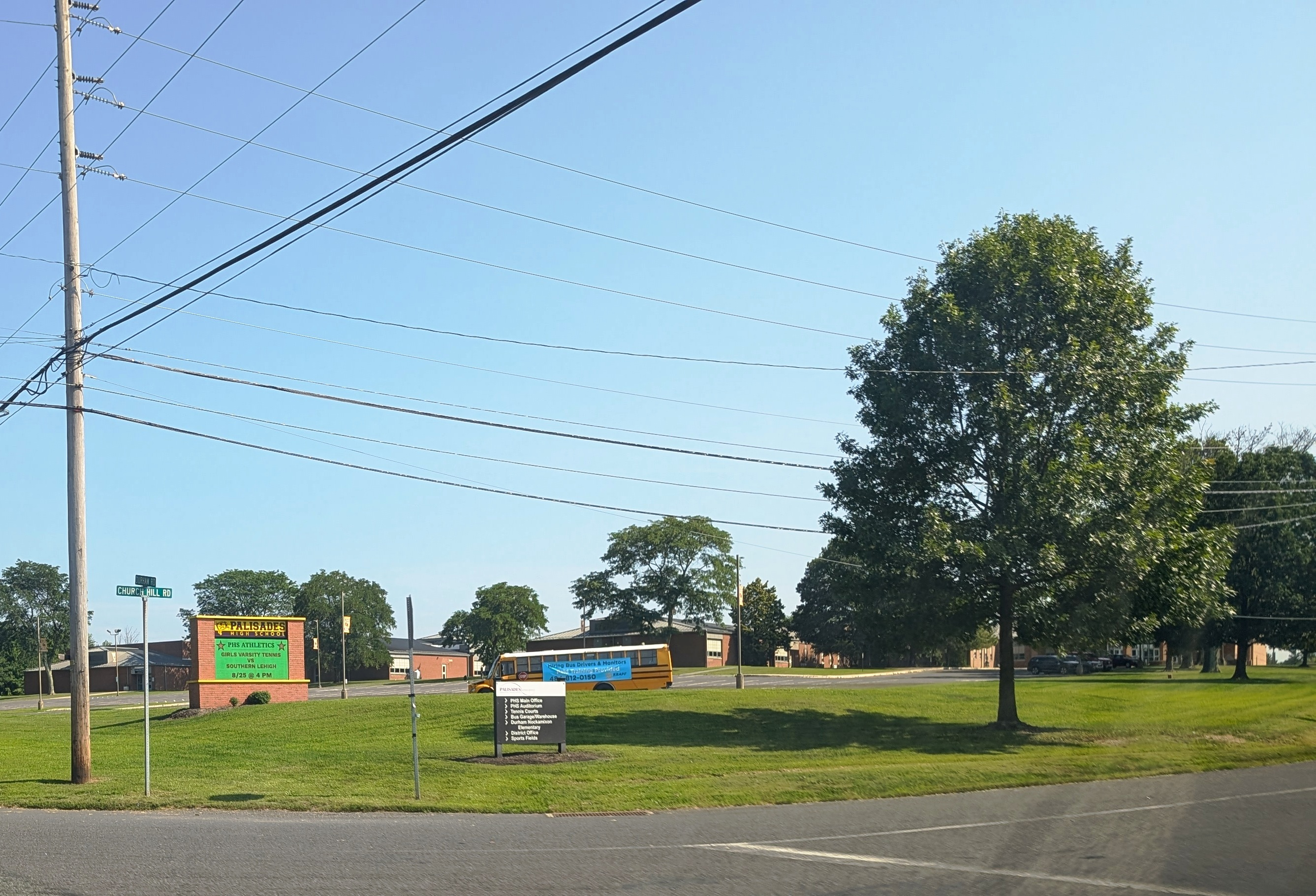

Location
- 35 Church Hill Road; Kintnersville, Bucks County, Pennsylvania 18930; United States; 40.52°N 75.20°W

Information
- Established: 1953
- Teaching staff: 43.00 (on an FTE basis)
- Grades: 9–12
- Enrollment: 469 (2023–2024)
- Student to teacher ratio: 10.91
- Colors: Purple and gold
- Mascot: Pirate
- Team name: Pirates
- Website: https://hs.palisd.org/

Palisades High School is a public high school in Kintnersville, Bucks County, Pennsylvania, United States. It is the only public high school that serves the Palisades School District, with students coming from Tinicum, Nockamixon, Springfield, Durham, and Bridgeton Townships, as well as the borough of Riegelsville.

The school serves grades 9–12. Many students take online courses taught by Palisades teachers to obtain credit in a specified course. Online classes offered currently include 12th grade English, global perspectives, health, biology, and algebra.

The school has undergone many changes since it first opened. In 1991, 7th and 8th grade students relocated to the new Palisades Middle School, along with 6th graders from the elementary schools. The high school underwent a major renovation in 2004. Riegelsville Borough would join the school district in 2013, after having previously been part of the Easton Area School District.

== Athletics ==
Palisades competes in the Colonial League of the Pennsylvania Interscholastic Athletic Association (PIAA).
