= Gallows Hill, Pennsylvania =

Unincorporated community in Pennsylvania, US

- Unincorporated community
- Location within Pennsylvania
- Coordinates: 40°31′50″N 75°13′19″W
- Country: United States
- State: Pennsylvania
- County: Bucks
- Township: Springfield
- Elevation: 617 ft (188 m)
- Time zone: UTC-5 (Eastern (EST))
  - Summer (DST): UTC-4 (EDT)
- ZIP code: 18930
- Area codes: 610 and 484
- GNIS feature ID: 1173597

Pennsylvania Historical Marker
- Designated: 1925

Gallows Hill is an unincorporated community in Springfield Township in Bucks County, Pennsylvania, United States. Gallows Hill is located at the intersection of Pennsylvania Route 412 and Stony Garden Road/Gallows Hill Road.

== Etymology ==
The community's name was derived from an 18th-century traveler who hanged himself from a tree.
