= The Lookout (Springfield Township) =

- Location within Pennsylvania

Highest point
- Elevation: 906 ft (276 m); National Elevation Dataset
- Prominence: 179 ft (55 m)
- Parent peak: Flint Hill
- Isolation: 0.9 mi (1.4 km) Kohlberg
- Coordinates: 40°30′38″N 75°20′50″WNational Elevation Dataset

Geography
- Location: Springfield Township, Bucks County, Pennsylvania

The Lookout is the second highest summit in Bucks County, Pennsylvania in the United States. Rising over Rocky Valley, it is located in Springfield Township, Bucks County, Pennsylvania, in the United States.

== Physiography ==
The Lookout is described in the Bucks County Natural Areas Inventory Update and the Springfield Township Conservation Plan as one of five outstanding geological features of Pennsylvania located in the county and is designated as a Priority 2 site, an area that has 'countywide or statewide significance based on overall quality and the diversity and importance of the resources'. It contains the headwaters of the Tohickon Creek and is part of the Cooks Creek Conservation Landscape and the Upper Tohickon Creek Conservation Landscape.

== Hydrology ==
It is part of the Tohickon Creek and Hickon Creek watersheds, which is a part of the Delaware River watershed.

== Geology ==
- Appalachian Highlands Division
  - Piedmont Province
    - Gettysburg-Newark Lowland Section
      - Diabase

The Lookout is part of a circular formation, which surrounds the Quakertown area, of diabase intrusion that occurred during the Triassic approximately 200 million years ago. A similar formation is located around the area which includes Pennsburg, East Greenville, and Red Hill, in Montgomery County, Pennsylvania. The only other known similar formation is located in South Africa. The diabase is typically dark gray to black, dense, and fine grained, consisting of predominately labradorite and augite.
