= Amity, Pennsylvania =

Amity, Pennsylvania, is the name of two unincorporated communities:

- Amity, Bucks County, Pennsylvania
- Amity, Washington County, Pennsylvania

== See also ==
- Amity Township, Berks County, Pennsylvania
- Amity Township, Erie County, Pennsylvania
