= Pennsylvania Route 412 =

State highway in Pennsylvania, US

Pennsylvania Route 412

Route information
- Maintained by PennDOT and City of Bethlehem
- Length: 17.745 mi (28.558 km)
- Existed: 1928–present

Major junctions
- South end: PA 611 in Nockamixon Township
- PA 563 in Nockamixon Township; PA 212 in Springfield Township; I-78 in Hellertown
- North end: PA 378 in Bethlehem

Location
- Country: United States
- State: Pennsylvania
- Counties: Bucks, Northampton

Highway system
- Pennsylvania State Route System; Interstate; US; State; Scenic; Legislative
← PA 410	→ PA 413

Pennsylvania Route 412 (PA 412) is a 17.75-mile-long (28.57 km) north–south state route located in Bucks and Northampton counties in southeastern Pennsylvania. Its southern terminus is at PA 611 in the Nockamixon Township community of Harrow. Its northern terminus is at PA 378 in Bethlehem.

The route passes through rural areas in northern Bucks County, forming a concurrency with PA 212 in the Springtown area. From there, PA 412 continues into Northampton County and passes through Hellertown before coming to an interchange with Interstate 78 (I-78) and heading into Bethlehem. In Bethlehem, PA 412 passes the former Bethlehem Steel site and runs through the South Side neighborhood.

PA 412 was originally part of the 18th-century Durham Road that ran through Bucks County and north into the Lehigh Valley. The route was first designated by 1927 between PA 212 in Springtown and PA 12 in Bethlehem. PA 412 was extended south to U.S. Route 611 (US 611) in Harrow by 1930. The route was realigned through the South Side of Bethlehem in the 1980s.

== Route description ==
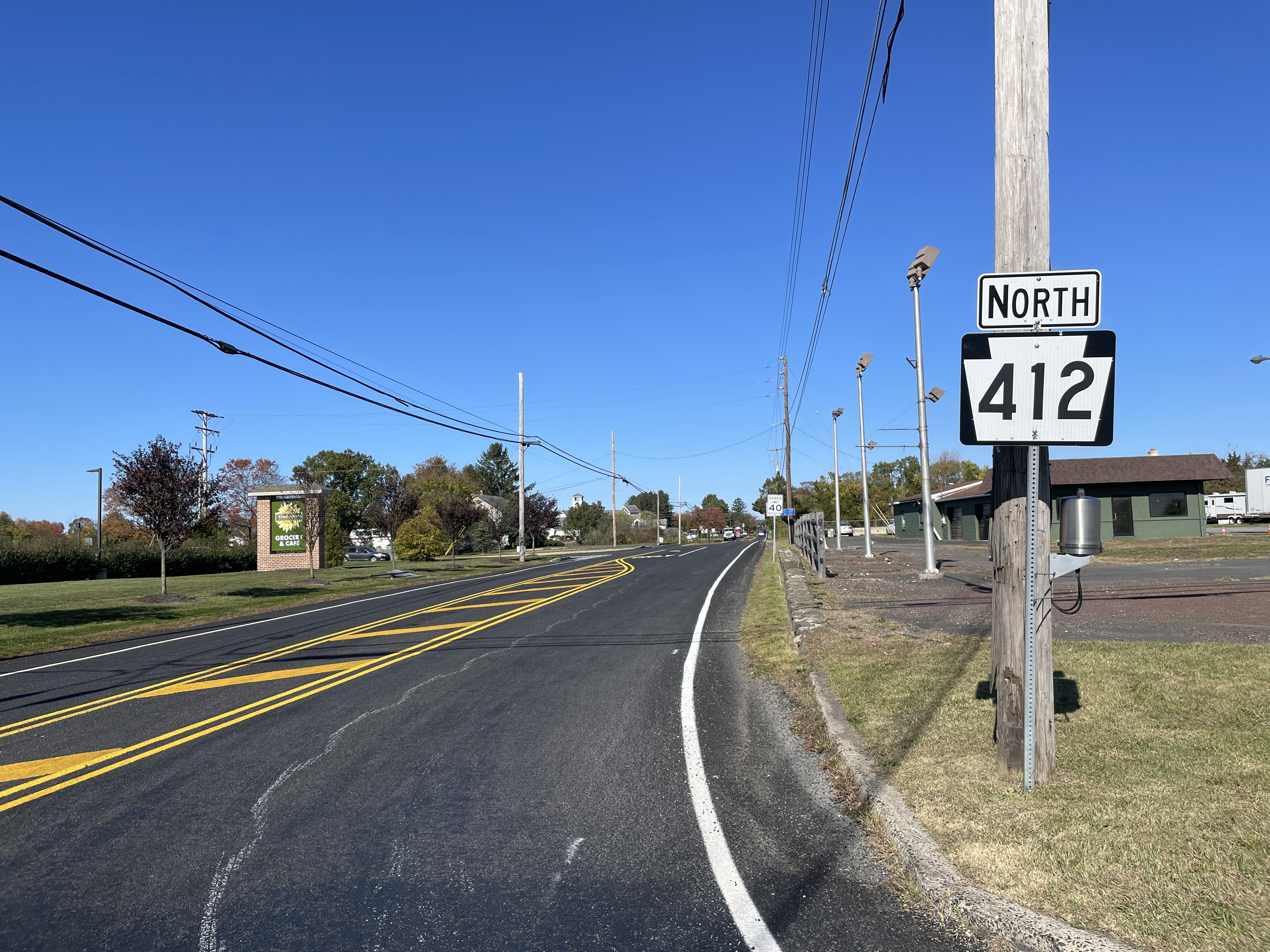
PA 412 northbound past its southern terminus at PA 611 in Harrow

PA 412 begins at an intersection with PA 611 in the community of Harrow in Nockamixon Township, Bucks County, heading northwest on two-lane undivided Durham Road. The road passes through farmland with some homes and businesses, coming to an intersection with the northern terminus of PA 563. The route continues through a mix of farmland and woodland with some development, passing through Bucksville and heading to the southwest of Palisades High School. PA 412 enters Springfield Township and becomes an unnamed road, passing through Gallows Hill. The road winds northwest through more rural areas and comes to an intersection with PA 212. At this point, PA 412 turns west to join PA 212 in a concurrency, heading through forests and fields and crossing Cooks Creek before passing through the residential community of Springtown as Main Street. The road curves southwest and heads back into rural areas as an unnamed road. PA 412 splits from PA 212 by turning west onto Hellertown Road, passing through farmland and woodland.

The route enters Lower Saucon Township in Northampton County, which is in the Lehigh Valley, becoming Leithsville Road and running through more rural areas. The road turns north at the community of Leithsville and passes through woodland with homes and commercial establishments. PA 412 enters the borough of Hellertown and becomes Main Street, a three-lane road with a center left-turn lane that runs past businesses. The route becomes two lanes again and becomes lined with homes with a few businesses as it continues north through Hellertown. The road becomes the border between Hellertown to the west and the city of Bethlehem to the east as it comes to an interchange with I-78. A park and ride lot is located west of the road at this interchange.

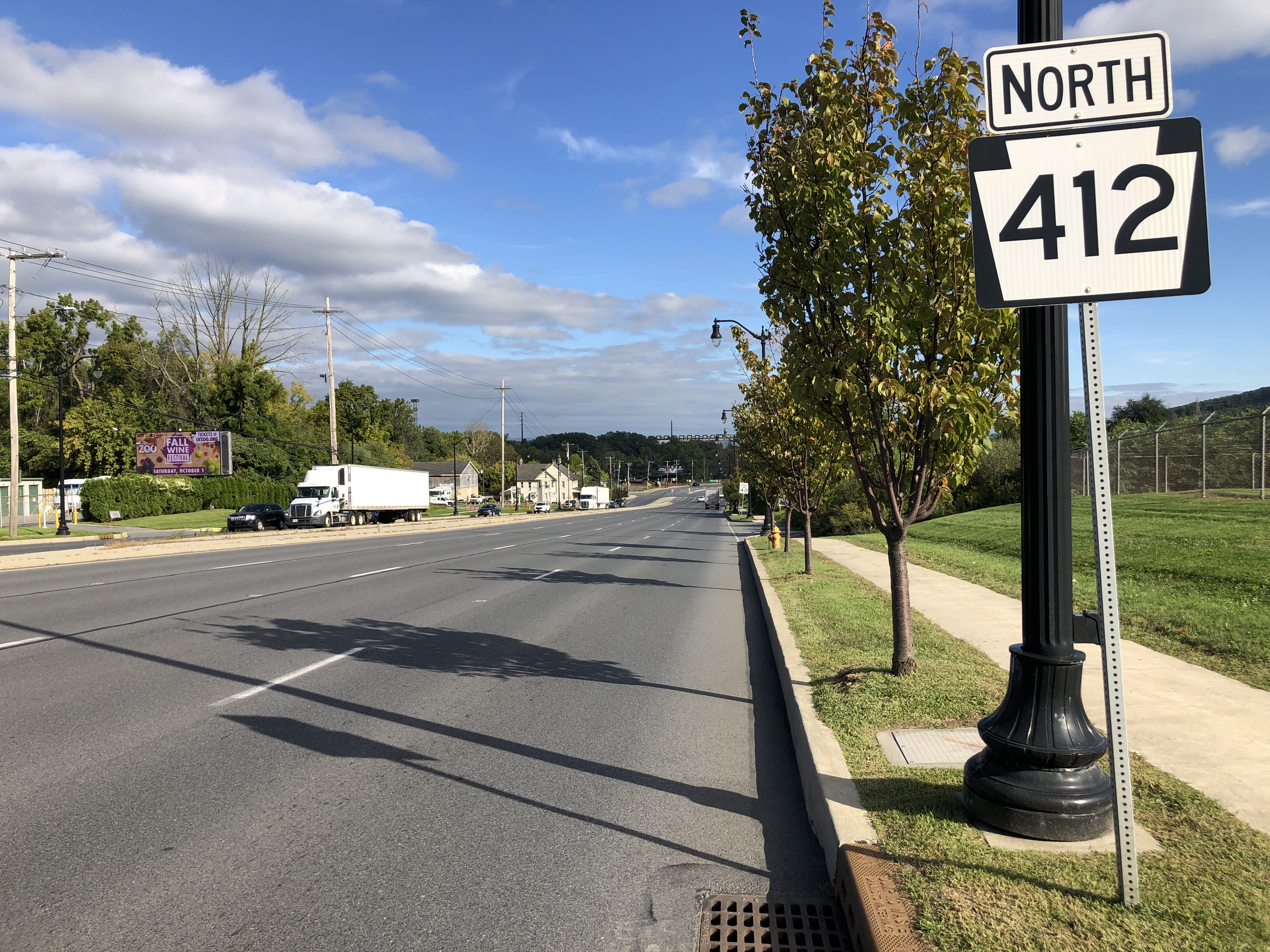
PA 412 northbound in Bethlehem

Past this interchange, PA 412 fully enters Bethlehem and becomes Hellertown Road, passing through commercial areas. The route gains a second northbound lane and crosses over the Saucon Creek and under a Lehigh Valley Rail Management railroad line before turning northwest onto East 4th Street at the Shimersville Road intersection, where there is a northbound jughandle. The road passes between an industrial park at the former Bethlehem Steel plant to the north and a railroad yard to the south, curving west and becoming a three-lane road with one northbound lane and two southbound lanes. PA 412 passes over the Lehigh Valley Rail Management line before turning northwest onto four-lane divided Daly Avenue. The route passes between the Wind Creek Bethlehem casino resort to the north and residential neighborhoods to the south, curving west. The road intersects the south end of the Minsi Trail Bridge, which carries Stefko Boulevard across the Lehigh River. PA 412 runs to the south of more of the former Bethlehem Steel site, turning west onto undivided East 3rd Street, with two northbound lanes and one southbound lane. The route passes through commercial areas, narrowing to two lanes and heading through the downtown area of the South Side neighborhood of Bethlehem. PA 412 intersects an access road to the Hill to Hill Bridge, which carries PA 378 over the Lehigh River to the north, at which point PA 412 turns south onto Brodhead Avenue. A short distance later, the route turns southwest onto Broadway and passes through urban areas of homes and businesses. PA 412 reaches its northern terminus at an intersection with PA 378 known as Five Points.

== History ==
The predecessor to PA 412 was the Durham Road, an 18th-century road that linked Bristol with upper Bucks County, where it split into branches serving various communities such as Bethlehem and Easton. When Pennsylvania first legislated its state routes in 1911, what is now PA 412 was not designated as part of a route. PA 412 was first designated by 1927 to run from PA 212 near Springtown north to PA 12 (now PA 378) in Bethlehem. At this time, the entire route was paved except for the southernmost portion. By 1930, PA 412 was extended south to it current terminus at US 611 (now PA 611) in Harrow. By this time, the entire route was paved. PA 412 was realigned in Bethlehem to use Daly Avenue, 3rd Street, Brodhead Avenue and Broadway instead of 4th Street to reach PA 378 in the 1980s. In March 2012, a project began to widen PA 412 between Cherry Lane in Hellertown and Daly Avenue in Bethlehem. This project expanded the road to two southbound lanes and three northbound lanes between I-78 and Shimersville Road and improved the interchange with I-78. The project was finished in 2016.

== Major intersections ==
County	Location	mi	km	Destinations	Notes
Bucks	Nockamixon Township	0.000	0.000	PA 611 (Easton Road) – Easton, Doylestown	Southern terminus
Bucks	Nockamixon Township	0.509	0.819	PA 563 south (Mountain View Drive) – Quakertown, Dublin	Northern terminus of PA 563
Bucks	Springfield Township	6.945	11.177	PA 212 east (Durham Road) – Riegelsville	Southern end of PA 212 concurrency
Bucks	Springfield Township	8.827	14.206	PA 212 west (Springfield Road) – Quakertown	Northern end of PA 212 concurrency
Northampton	Bethlehem	14.222	22.888	I-78 – Allentown, Easton	Exit 67 on I-78
Northampton	Bethlehem	17.745	28.558	PA 378 (Wyandotte Street)	Northern terminus; former PA 191
1.000 mi = 1.609 km; 1.000 km = 0.621 mi: Concurrency terminus
