= Bucksville =

Bucksville may refer to:

- Bucksville, South Carolina
- Bucksville, Pennsylvania
- Gasper, Kentucky, formerly known as Bucksville
- Bucksville (film), a 2011 independent film directed by Chel White

== See also ==
- Buckville
