= Pleasant Valley, Bucks County, Pennsylvania =

Unincorporated community in Pennsylvania, US

Pleasant Valley Schuckenhausen
- Unincorporated community
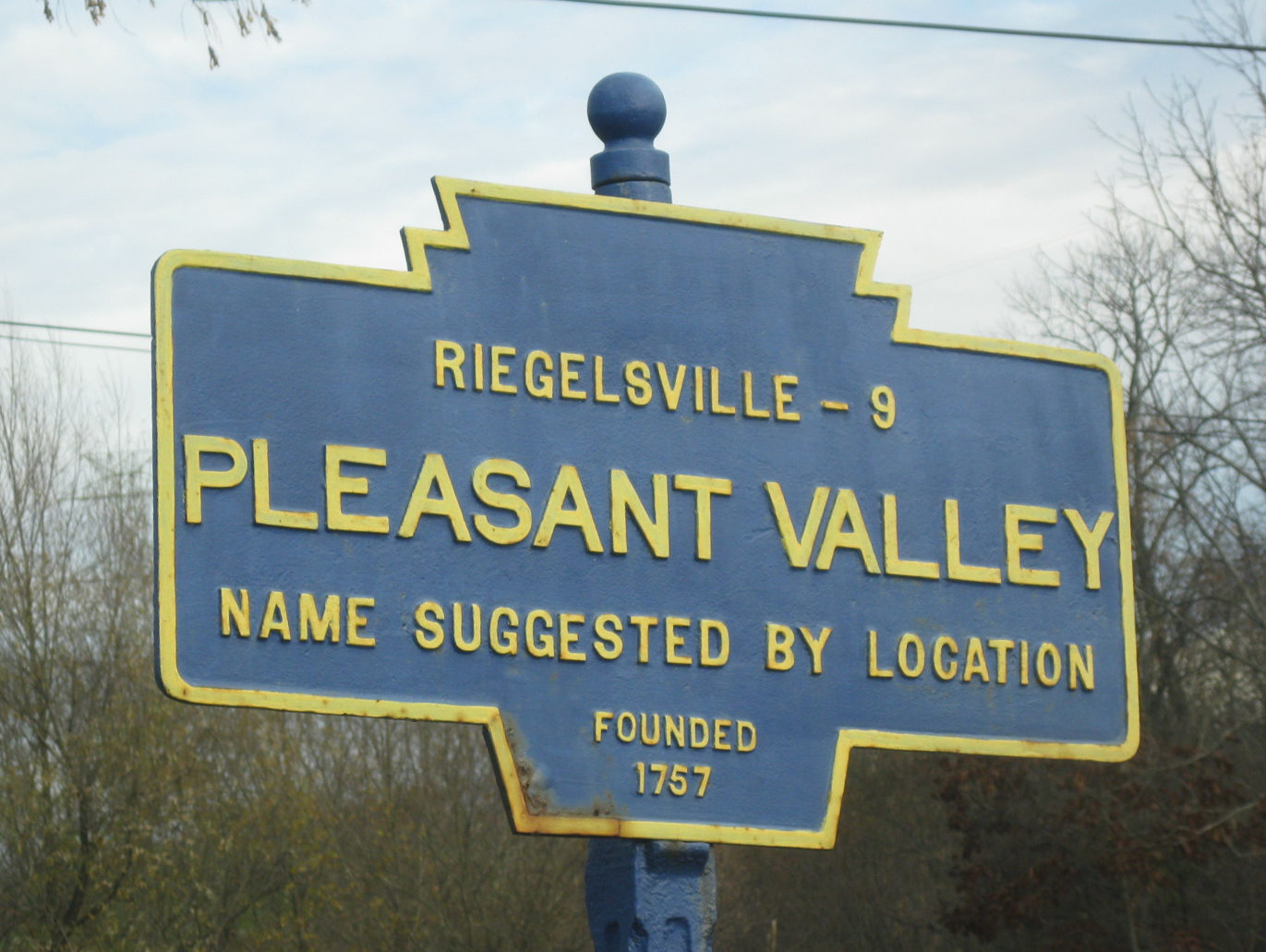
- Keystone Marker

- Pleasant Valley Pleasant Valley (the United States)
- Coordinates: 40°31′16″N 75°17′34″W
- Country: United States
- State: Pennsylvania
- County: Bucks
- Township: Springfield
- Elevation: 472 ft (144 m)
- Time zone: UTC-5 (Eastern (EST))
  - Summer (DST): UTC-4 (EDT)
- Postal code: 18951
- Area codes: 215, 267, 445

Pleasant Valley is an unincorporated community in Springfield Township, Bucks County, Pennsylvania, United States.

== History ==
Prior to European settlement, the area was inhabited by the Lenape people. Its first name was Schuckenhausen, the name of the first church in this location constructed as a log building. In 1872, it was replaced by a stone church known as the Union Church, later becoming a dwelling. The oldest building is the Pleasant Valley Inn, now out of business. General Lafayette stopped at the inn on the way to a hospital in Bethlehem after being wounded in the Battle of Brandywine. The village was built upon two farms, one owned by Jacob Smith and the other John J. Ott. the name was changed to Pleasant Valley when the post office was established on September 15, 1828, by Lewis Ott, first postmaster.

Pleasant Valley was entered into the Geographic Names Information System of the United States Geological Survey on 2 August 1979 as identification number 1184062.

== Geography ==
Pleasant Valley is located on Quakertown Road, also known as Pennsylvania Route 212, at coordinates 40°31′16″N 75°17′34″W, approximately 4 miles (6.4 km) northeast of Richlandtown. Coopersburg is located 5 miles (8.0 km) to the west. Its elevation is listed as 472 feet (144 m). Pleasant Valley is located between three nearby summits, Cressman Hill 1.5 miles (2.4 km) to the southeast (elevation 673 feet (205 m)), Molasses Hill 1.25 miles (2.01 km) to the east (elevation 495 feet (151 m)) and The Lookout 3 miles (4.8 km) to the west (elevation 906 feet (276 m). Cooks Creek, part of the Delaware River watershed, passes just south of the community.

== Geology ==
Pleasant Valley is located within the Brunswick Formation laid during the Triassic, consisting of mudstone, siltstone as well as brown, green and reddish-brown shale.
