= Knecht's Mill Covered Bridge =

- Knecht's Covered Bridge
- U.S. National Register of Historic Places
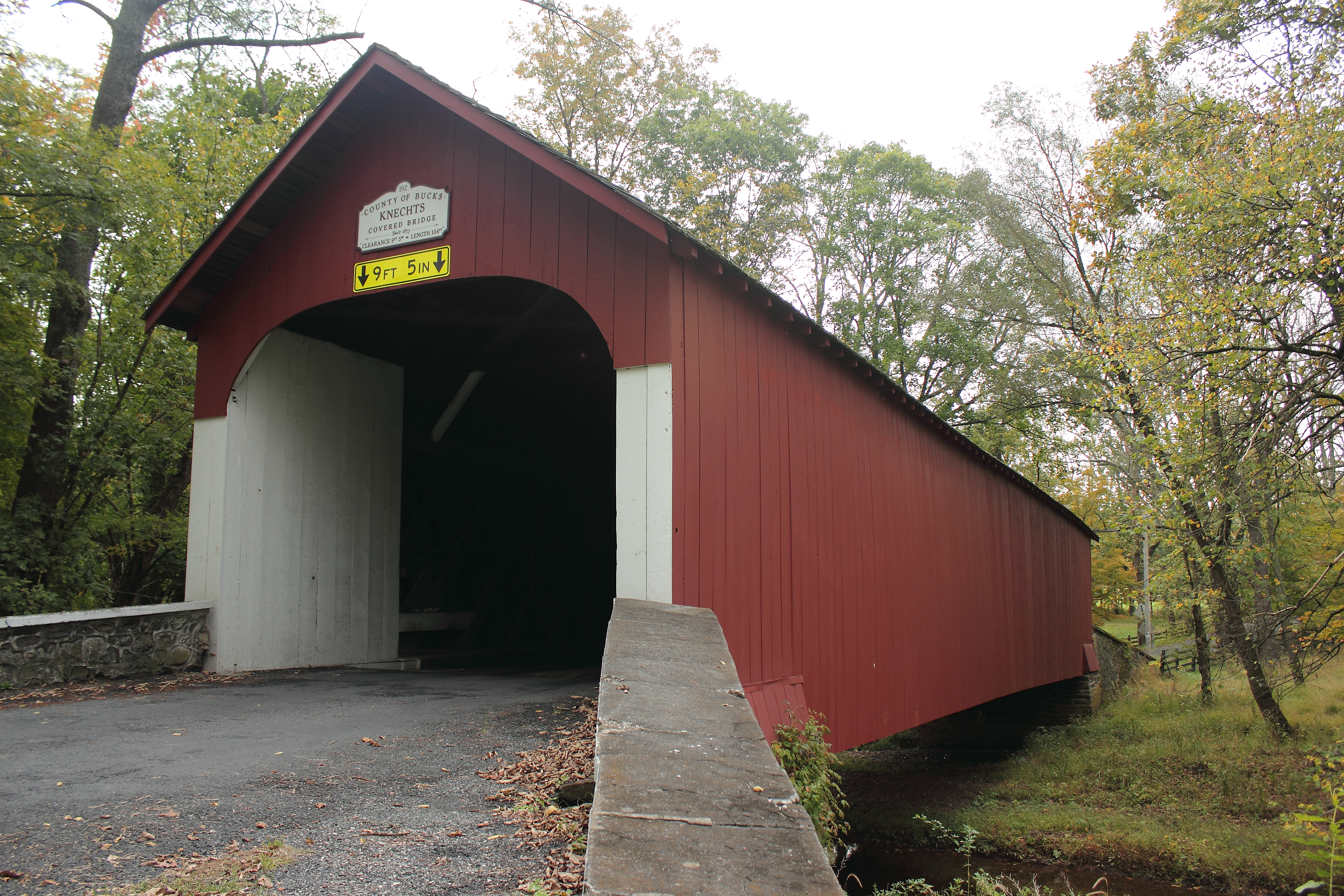
- Knecht's Covered Bridge, September 2012

- Location within Pennsylvania Location within the United States
- Location: Northeast of Springtown on Township 424, Springfield Township, Pennsylvania
- Coordinates: 40°32′17″N 75°16′40″W
- Area: 0.1 acres (0.040 ha)
- Built: 1873
- Architectural style: Town truss
- MPS: Covered Bridges of the Delaware River Watershed TR
- NRHP reference No.: 80003432
- Added to NRHP: December 1, 1980

Knecht's Covered Bridge is a historic covered bridge in Springfield Township, Bucks County, Pennsylvania. It crosses Cooks Creek on Knecht Bridge Road south of Springtown. Built in 1873 in the town truss style, the bridge is 110 feet long and 15 feet wide.

It was added to the National Register of Historic Places on December 1, 1980.

== See also ==
- National Register of Historic Places listings in Bucks County, Pennsylvania
- List of bridges on the National Register of Historic Places in Pennsylvania
