= Jacob Funk House and Barn =

Historic house in Pennsylvania, United States

- U.S. National Register of Historic Places
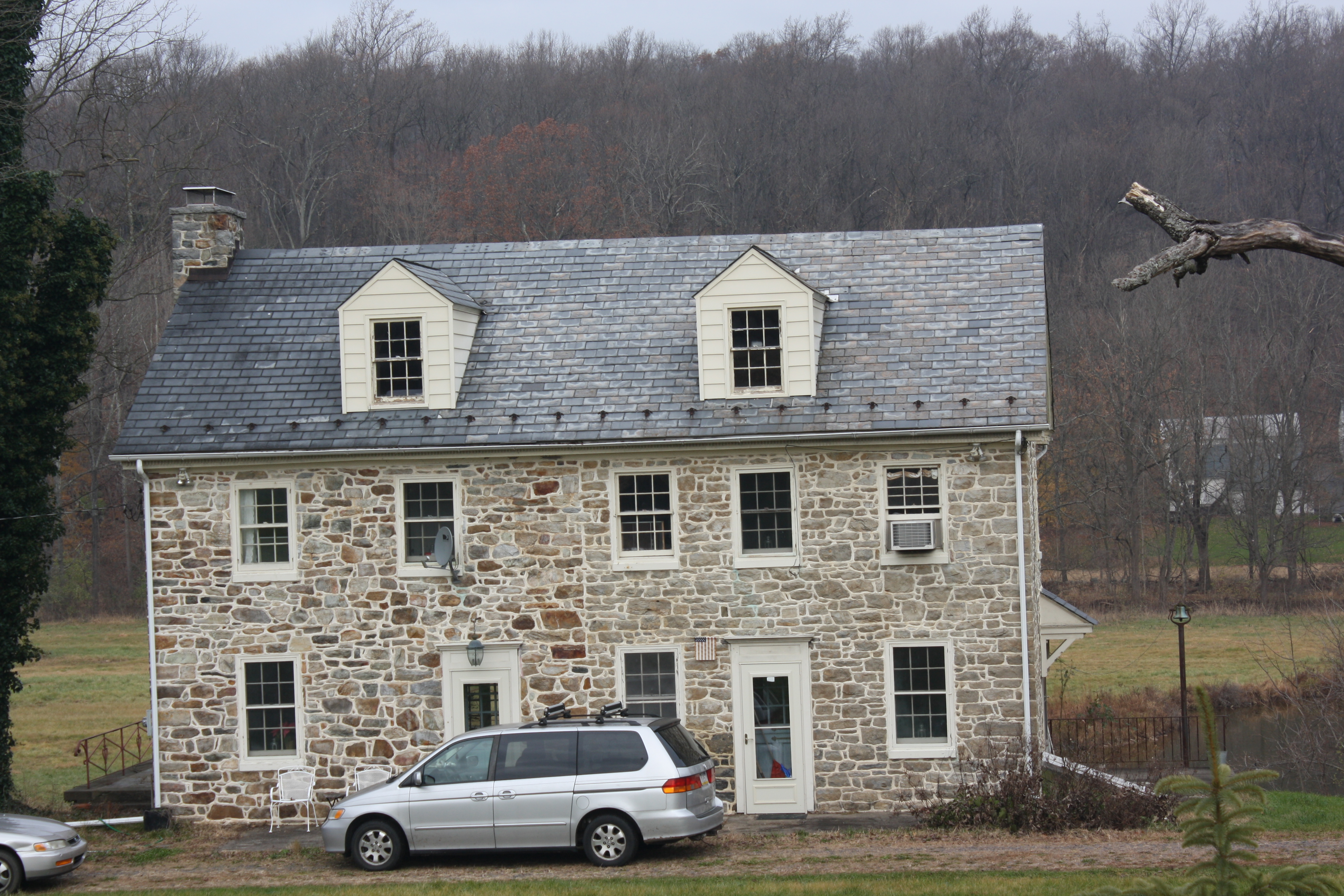
- Jacob Funk House. November 2012.

- Location within Pennsylvania Location within the United States
- Location: 3609 PA 212, Springfield Township, Pennsylvania
- Coordinates: 40°33′25.5″N 75°16′3.8″W
- Area: 1.6 acres (0.65 ha)
- Architectural style: Georgian, Colonial Revival, bank barn
- NRHP reference No.: 07000030
- Added to NRHP: February 7, 2007

The Jacob Funk House and Barn is an historic home that is located in Springfield Township, Bucks County, Pennsylvania.

It was added to the National Register of Historic Places in 2007.

== History and architectural features ==
This historic house consists of three sections; the oldest was built circa 1792. It is a 2 1/2-story, stone dwelling which measures forty feet wide by twenty-eight feet deep. It was designed in the Georgian style.

The oldest section is a two-story, two-bay, stone structure that is two rooms deep. Sometime around 1855, a two-story, three-bay extension was added to the east gable. A kitchen and bath addition was built circa 1930. The house was remodeled in the Colonial Revival style roughly between 1945 and 1955, at which time a one-story addition and deck were added to the rear of the house. Also located on the property are a contributing stone bank barn (c. 1810) and stone spring house (c. 1855).

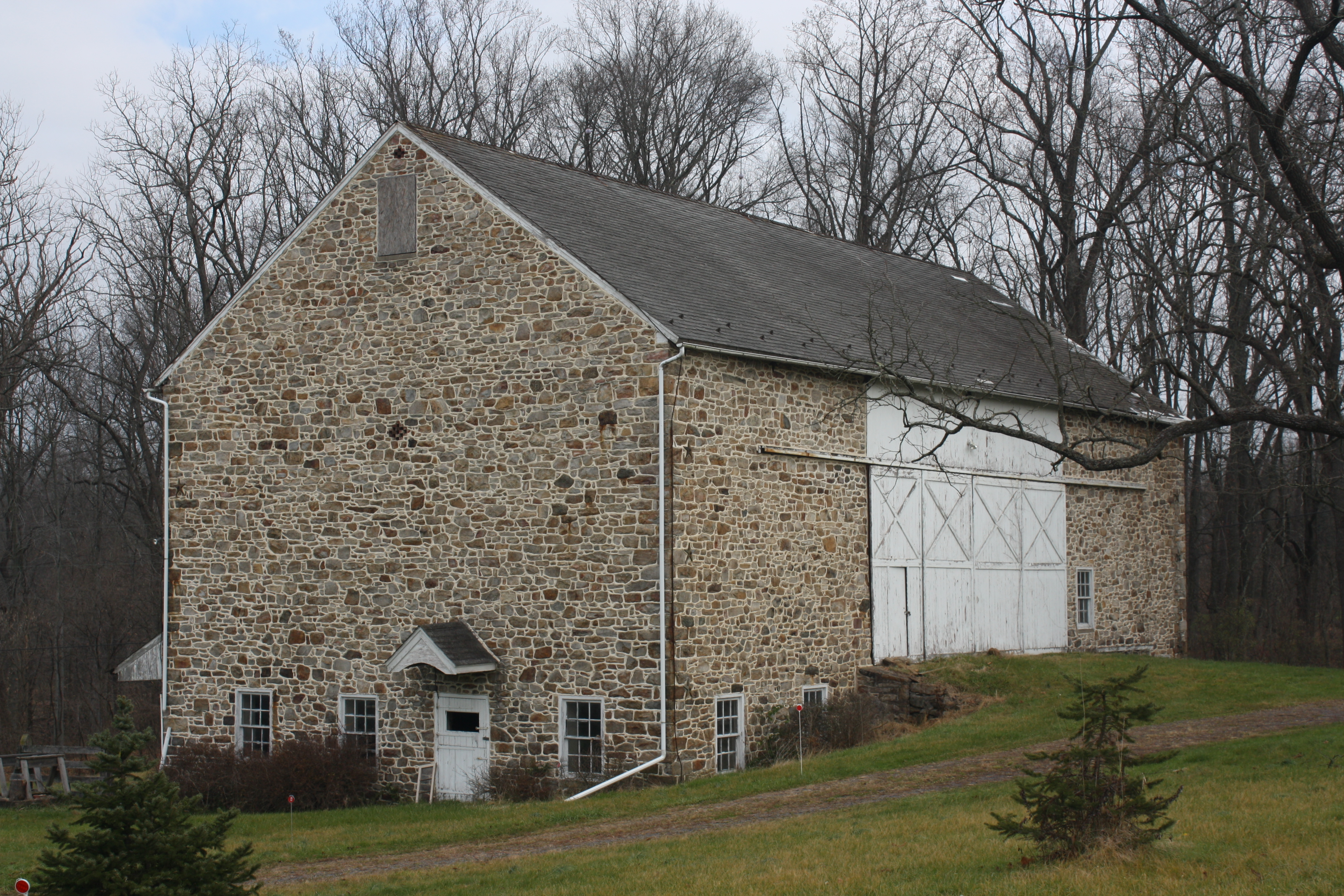
Bank Barn at Jacob Funk House.
