= Springhouse Farm =

- U.S. National Register of Historic Places
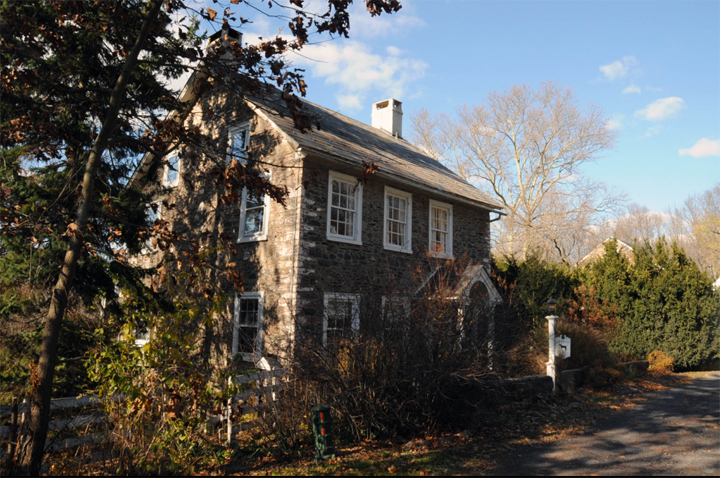
- Springhouse Farm in 2011

- Location within Pennsylvania Location within the United States
- Location: 2184 Springhouse Ln., Springfield, Pennsylvania
- Coordinates: 40°31′44″N 75°16′27″W
- Area: 43.9 acres (17.8 ha)
- Built: 1940
- Architectural style: Georgian
- NRHP reference No.: 07000796
- Added to NRHP: August 8, 2007

The Springhouse Farm, also known as the Eric Knight Farm, is an historic home and farm complex that is located in Springfield Township, Bucks County, Pennsylvania, United States.

It was added to the National Register of Historic Places in 2007.

== History and architectural features ==
This historic house is a Georgian-style, stone farmhouse that was built circa 1808. An addition was later erected circa 1941. Other contributing buildings and structures are a stone and frame bank barn (c. 1810) with a carriage house addition (c. 1890), a stone spring house (c. 1810), a stone root cellar (c. 1810), a corn crib (c. 1895), a man-made pond (c. 1940), an outdoor oven (c. 1940), and an privy (c. 1900). The property also includes the burial site for Toots, the dog that inspired the novel Lassie Come-Home. Toots died in 1945; the burial site marker was added circa 1970. The story's author, Eric Knight (1897-1943), resided at Springhouse Farm from 1939 to 1943.
