= Cooks Creek (Delaware River tributary) =

Cooks Creek Cook Creek, Durham Creek, Schooks Creek, Scookes Creek, Scooks Creek, Squooks Creek
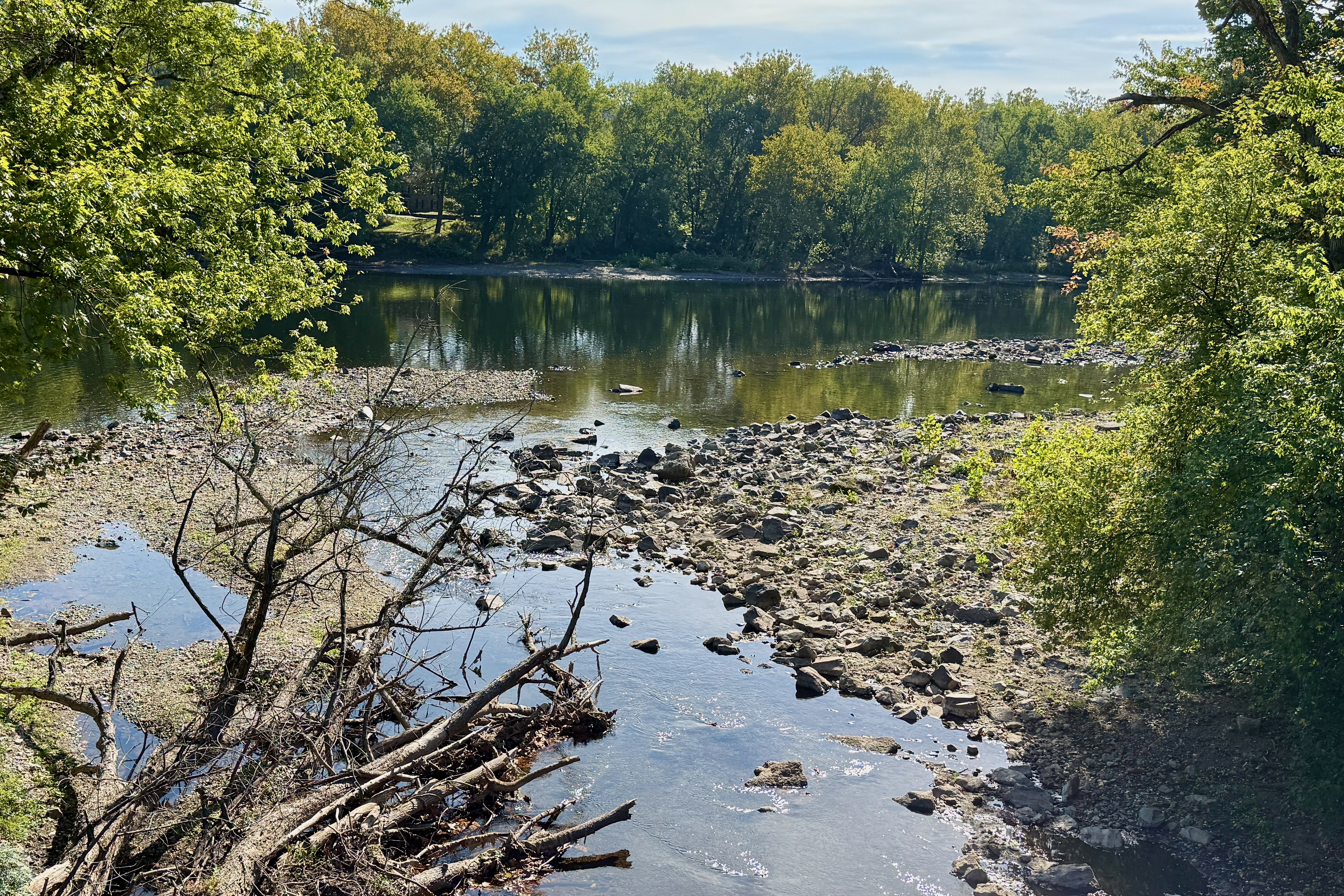
- Confluence with the Delaware River

- Cooks Creek

Location
- Country: United States
- State: Pennsylvania
- County: Bucks
- Township: Springfield
- Township: Durham

Physical characteristics
- Source
  - coordinates: 40°31′25″N 75°20′17″W
  - elevation: 750 feet (230 m)
- Mouth
  - coordinates: 40°34′48″N 75°11′48″W
  - elevation: 141 feet (43 m)
- Length: 13 miles (21 km)
- Basin size: 29.50 square miles (76.4 km^{2})

Basin features
- Progression: Cooks Creek → Delaware River
- River system: Delaware River
- Tributaries
  - right: Hollow Run
- Bridges: Passer Road; State Road; Richlandtown Pike; Funks Mill Road; Pennsylvania Route 212 (Durham Road); Molasses Way; Bridge Street; Old Bethlehem Road; Shale Road; Township Road; Knecht Bridge Road; Slifer Valley Road; Pennsylvania Route 412 (Durham Road); Durham Road; Stouts Valley Road; Pennsylvania Route 611 (Easton Road); Delaware Canal aqueduct and towpath
- Slope: 46.85 feet per mile (8.873 m/km)

Cooks Creek (also known as Cook Creek, Durham Creek, Schooks Creek, Scookes Creek, Scooks Creek, Squooks Creek) is a tributary of the Delaware River in Bucks County, Pennsylvania, in the United States, rising in Springfield Township and passing through Durham Township before emptying into the Delaware River.

== History ==
Cooks Creek was thought by historian Edward Mathews to have been named after Arthur Cooke, a landowner in the area (though not a resident) in this part of the county before 1700, but, there is doubt about this. In a deed executed on 10 February 1727 between Samuel Powell, Jeremiah Langhorne, and others of Philadelphia for tracts of land in Durham Township, the stream was referred to as Scooks Creek and the modern name may have been derived from that. The Creek was a major source of power for the Durham Mill and Furnace and a water supply to the Canal. In the 1940s, the creek was the only creek in Bucks County in which brook trout (Salvelinus fontinalis) was native. Knecht's Mill Covered Bridge was entered into the National Register of Historic Places on 1 December 1980 as reference number 80003432.

== Statistics ==
Cooks Creek was entered into the Geographic Names Information System of the U.S. Geological Survey on 2 August 1979 as identification number 1172390. In the Pennsylvania Gazetteer of Streams, its identification number is 03295. It rises in Springfield Township about halfway between Coopersburg and Pleasant Valley at an elevation of 750 feet (230 m) and empties into the Delaware River about 0.7 miles (1.1 km) downstream of Reigelsville at an elevation of 141 feet (43 m) after having flowed 13 miles (21 km). This results in an average slope of 46.85 feet per mile (8.873 m/km).

== Course ==
Cooks Creek rises in Springfield Township just west of Richlandtown Pike about halfway between Coopersburg and Pleasant Valley flowing to the southeast until it passes under Pennsylvania Route 212 where it turns to the northeast until it reaches the western slope of Cressman Hill where it turns north until it runs by the eastern end of Springtown, then turns northeast. As it approaches the north slope of Mine Hill, it receives Hollow Run from the right bank. Then lastly, it skirts around the north slope of Rattlesnake Hill and empties into the Delaware River. Besides Hollow Run, it receives five tributaries from the left and three from the right.

== Geology ==
Cooks Creek starts out on Flint Hill in the Quartz Fanglomerate laid down during the Jurassic and Triassic, consisting of Quartz conglomerate with round cobbles and boulders of quartzite, sandstone, quartz, and metarhyolite in red sand.

Then it passes through a region of Brunswick Formation, also formed during the Jurassic and Triassic, consisting of mudstone, siltstone, and shale. Mineralogy includes argillite and hornfel.

Later, it flows through a region of the Leithsville Formation, from the Cambrian, consisting of dolomite, calcareous shale, and chert.

In two places, it briefly touches beds of the Hardyston Quartzite formation, from the Canbrian, containing quartzite, feldspathic sandstone and has quartz-pebble conglomerate.

Finally, it lies upon a region of the Allentown Formation, from the Cambrian, which contains dolomite, limestone, chert, siltstone, and some oolites, stromatolites, and sharpstone conglomerate.

== Crossings and Bridges ==
Crossing	NBI Number	Length	Lanes	Spans	Material/Design	Built	Reconstructed	Latitude	Longitude
Passer Road	-	-	-	-	-	-	-	-	
State Road	-	-	-	-	-	-	-	-	-
Richlandtown Pike	-	-	-	-	-	-	-	-	-
Funks Mill Road	-	-	-	-	-	-	-	-	-
Pennsylvania Route 212 (Quakertown Road)	6938	7 metres (23 ft)	2	1	Concrete Tee Beam	1924	-	40°29'48"N	75°18'36"W
Molasses Way	-	-	-	-	-	-	-	-	-
Bridge Street	7583	17 metres (56 ft)	1	1	Steel Truss - Thru	-	1950	40°30'58"N	75°17'33"W
Old Bethlehem Road	7472	17 metres (56 ft)	2	3	Masonry Arch-deck	1902	-	40°31'2"N	75°17'29.61"W
Shale Road	-	-	-	-	-	-	-	-	-
Township road	7585	26 metres (85 ft)	2	1	Prestressed concrete Box Beam or Girders - Single or Spread	1961	2014	40°31'29.9"N	75°16'32.4"W
Kecht Bridge Road (Knecht's Mill Covered Bridge)	7554	34 metres (112 ft)	1	1	Wood or Timber Truss -Thru (covered bridge)	-	1983	40°32'17.6"N	75°16'40.8"W
Slifer Valley Road	7444	16 metres (52 ft)	2	1	Steel Stringer/Multi-beam or Girder	1953	-	40°32'33.7"N	75°16'27.72"W
Pennsylvania Route 412 (Durham Road, Hellertown Road)	48227	8 metres (26 ft)	2	1	Concrete Culvert	2013	-	40°32'48"N	75°18'12"W
Durham Road	7454	15 metres (49 ft)	2	2	Concrete Tee Beam	1925	-	40°34'36.5"N	75°13'28.75"W
Stouts Valley Road	7565	29 metres (95 ft)	2	2	Concrete Tee Beam	1931	-	40°35'11.5"N	75°12'39.8"W
Pennsylvania Route 611 (Easton Road)	7088	22 metres (72 ft)	2	1	Prestressed concrete Box Beam or Girders - Multiple	1959	-	40°34'47.9"N	75°11'49.8"W
Delaware Canal Cooks Creek Aqueduct	-	-	-	-	-	-	-	40°34'47.8"N	75°11'48.6"W

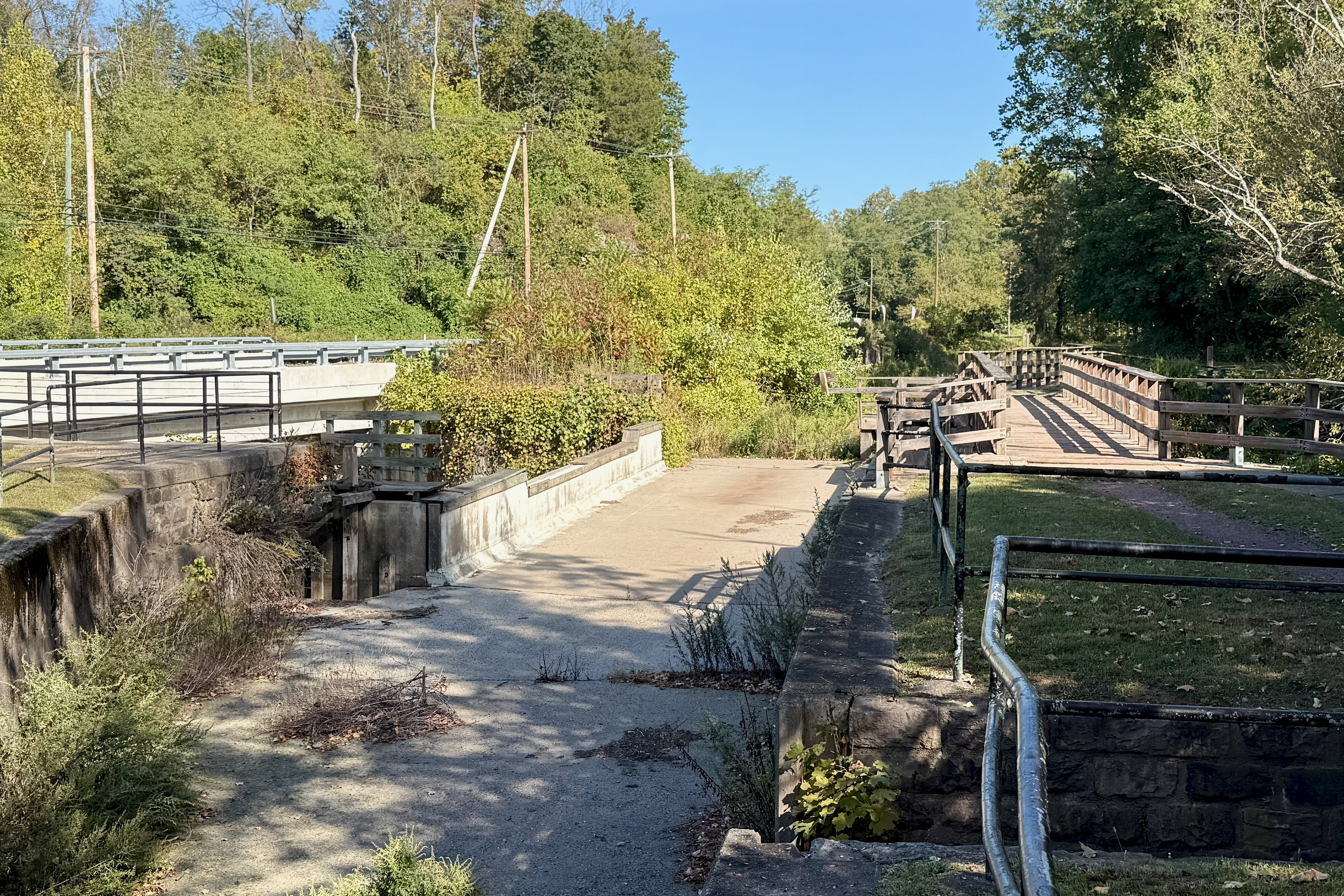
Easton Road Bridge and Cooks Creek Aqueduct

== See also ==
- List of rivers of Pennsylvania
- List of rivers of the United States
- List of Delaware River tributaries
