= Zionhill, Pennsylvania =

Unincorporated community in Pennsylvania, US

- Unincorporated community
- Location within Pennsylvania
- Coordinates: 40°29′03″N 75°23′38″W
- Country: United States
- State: Pennsylvania
- County: Bucks
- Township: Springfield
- Elevation: 666 ft (203 m)
- Time zone: UTC-5 (Eastern (EST))
  - Summer (DST): UTC-4 (EDT)
- ZIP Code: 18981
- Area codes: 215, 267 and 445
- GNIS feature ID: 1192019

Zionhill is an unincorporated community located in Springfield Township, Bucks County, Pennsylvania, United States. It is located on Old Bethlehem Pike east of the Unami Creek. While the village has its own box post office with the ZIP Code of 18981, surrounding areas use the Coopersburg ZIP Code of 18036 or the Quakertown ZIP Code of 18951.
