= Pennsylvania Route 212 =

State highway in Bucks County, Pennsylvania, US

Pennsylvania Route 212
- PA 212 in red and PA 212 Truck in blue

Route information
- Maintained by PennDOT
- Length: 14.918 mi (24.008 km)

Major junctions
- West end: PA 313 in Quakertown
- PA 412 in Springfield Township
- East end: PA 611 in Durham Township

Location
- Country: United States
- State: Pennsylvania
- Counties: Bucks

Highway system
- Pennsylvania State Route System; Interstate; US; State; Scenic; Legislative
← PA 210	→ PA 213

Pennsylvania Route 212 (PA 212) is a 14.9-mile-long (24.0 km) state highway in Bucks County, Pennsylvania. The route, which is signed east-west, runs from PA 313 in the borough of Quakertown northeast to PA 611 in Durham Township, just south of the borough of Riegelsville. The route, which is a two-lane undivided road its entire length, passes through rural areas of northern Bucks County, serving Richlandtown and Springtown. PA 212 has a concurrency with PA 412 through the Springtown area.

The westernmost part of PA 212 between Quakertown and Richlandtown was part of the Richland Turnpike or Plank Road Company, a company established in 1854 to build a turnpike connecting present-day PA 313 and PA 412. PA 212 was first designated by 1927 to run from U.S. Route 309 (US 309, now PA 309) and PA 312 (now PA 663) in Quakertown northeast to US 611 (now PA 611) in Riegelsville. The easternmost part of PA 212 was completed by 1940. PA 313 was designated concurrent with PA 212 on Broad Street in Quakertown by the 1970s. By the 1990s, the west end of PA 212 was cut back to its current location, removing the concurrency with PA 313.

== Route description ==
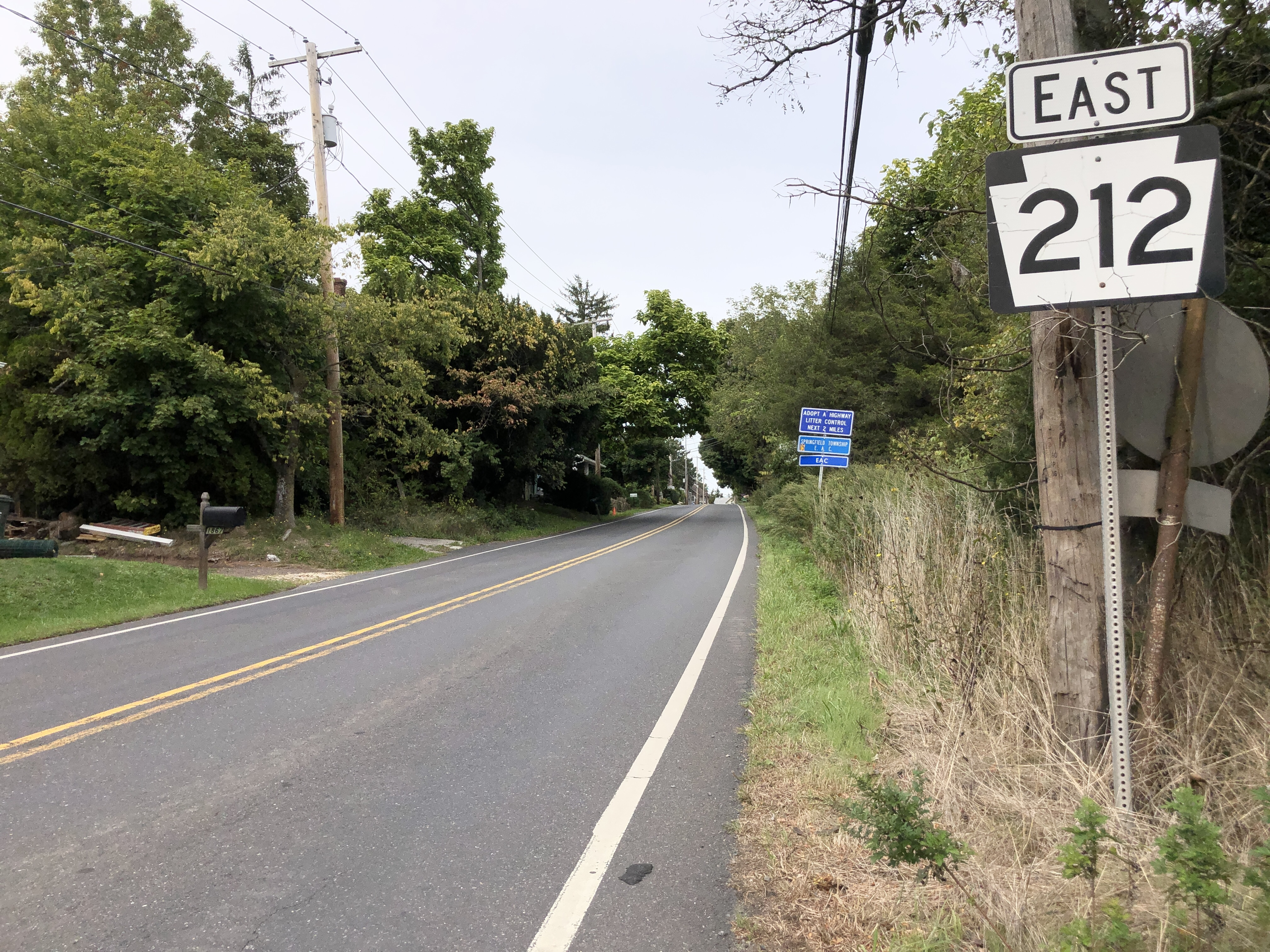
PA 212 eastbound in Springfield Township

PA 212 begins at an intersection with PA 313 in the borough of Quakertown in Bucks County, heading north on two-lane undivided Hellertown Avenue. The road passes through residential areas, crossing Licking Run before curving east and becoming Tohickon Avenue. The route leaves Quakertown for Richland Township and heads northeast, crossing Tohickon Creek and becoming Richlandtown Pike. PA 212 is lined with homes as it passes through rural areas, crossing into the borough of Richlandtown. Here, the name of the road changes to Main Street and it runs past more residences. The route turns northeast onto Church Road and heads back into Richland Township, where it heads north into farmland and woodland with some homes. PA 212 curves northeast and winds north into forested areas, entering Springfield Township. Here, the route becomes an unnamed road and crosses Cooks Creek, turning northeast into agricultural areas with some woods and homes. The road passes through the community of Pleasant Valley as it continues north through more rural areas. PA 212 reaches an intersection with PA 412, at which point that route joins PA 212 in a concurrency.

The road becomes Main Street and turns east, passing through the residential community of Springtown. Upon leaving Springtown, the road becomes unnumbered again and heads back into areas of forests and fields, crossing Cooks Creek. PA 412 splits from PA 212 by heading to the southeast. PA 212 continues east-northeast through rural areas, crossing into Durham Township. Here, the road heads through forested areas with some homes, crossing Hollow Run and passing through the community of Durham Mill. PA 212 curves east and parallels Cooks Creek before it reaches its eastern terminus at an intersection with PA 611 along the west bank of the Delaware River south of the borough of Riegelsville.

== History ==
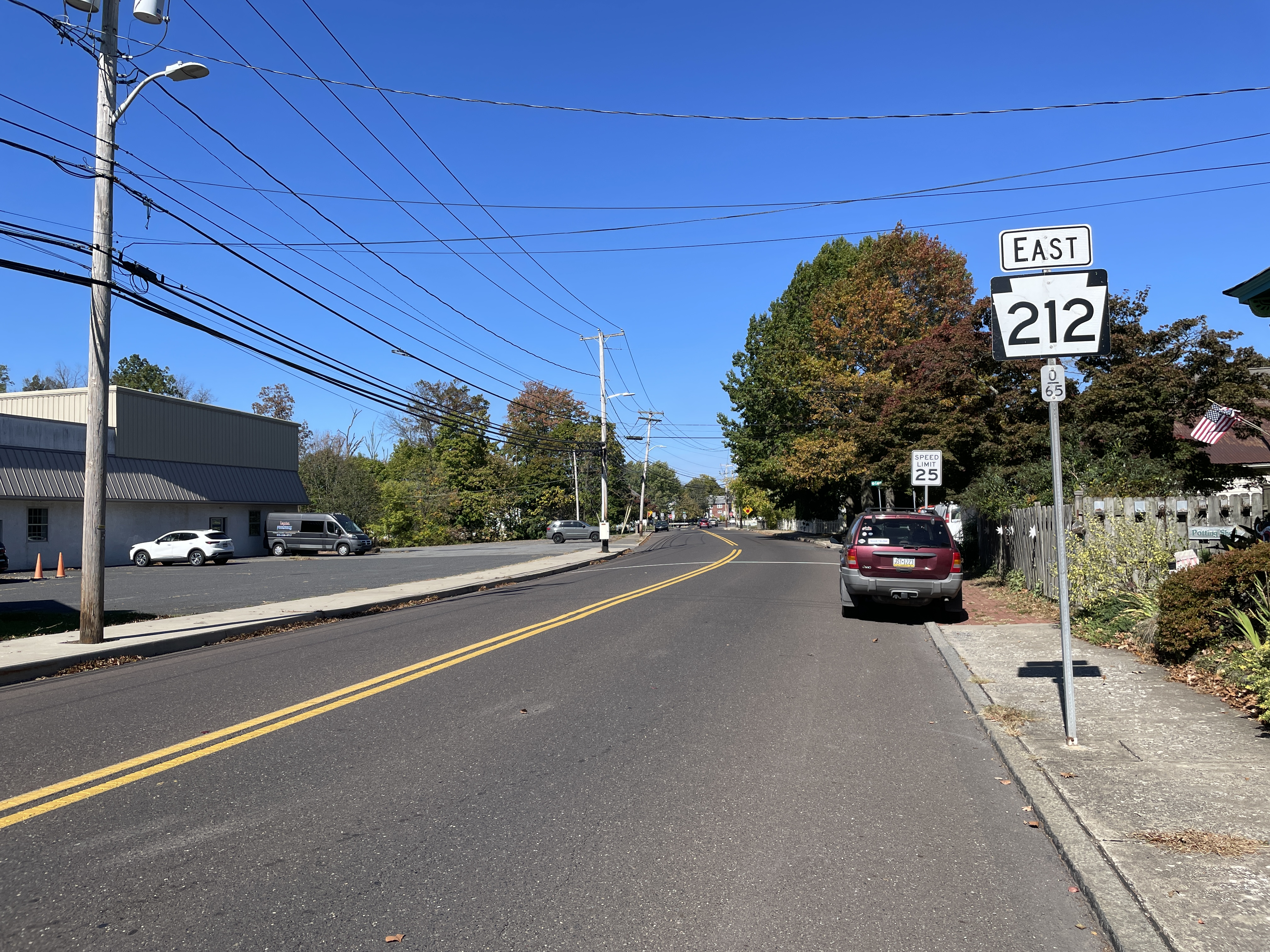
PA 212 eastbound in Quakertown

The portion of PA 212 between Quakertown and Richlandtown dates back to 1854, when the Richland Turnpike or Plank Road Company was created to build a turnpike linking the Doylestown Road (present-day PA 313) to the Hellertown Road (present-day PA 412). This road existed as an unimproved road into the 20th century. The present-day alignment of PA 212 was not legislated as a state highway in 1911. PA 212 was designated by 1927 to run from US 309 (now PA 309) and PA 312 (now PA 663) in Quakertown northeast to US 611 (now PA 611) in Riegelsville, heading east through Quakertown on Broad Street before following its current alignment. At this time, the route was paved from Quakertown to a short distance north of Richlandtown. By 1930, the route was paved from north of Richlandtown to past the east end of the PA 412 concurrency. The easternmost portion of the route leading to US 611 south of Riegelsville was under construction at this time. The portion of PA 212 under construction was completed by 1940. By 1971, PA 313 was extended west to run concurrent with PA 212 on Broad Street in Quakertown. The western terminus of PA 212 was cut back to its current location at PA 313 by 1991, removing the concurrency with PA 313.

== Major intersections ==
The entire route is in Bucks County.

Location	mi	km	Destinations	Notes
Quakertown	0.000	0.000	PA 313 (East Broad Street)	Western terminus
Springfield Township	8.624	13.879	PA 412 north (Hellertown Road)	Western end of PA 412 concurrency
Springfield Township	10.505	16.906	PA 412 south	Eastern end of PA 412 concurrency
Durham Township	14.918	24.008	PA 611 (Easton Road) – Easton, Doylestown	Eastern terminus
1.000 mi = 1.609 km; 1.000 km = 0.621 mi: Concurrency terminus

== PA 212 Truck ==
Pennsylvania Route 212 Truck
- Location: Quakertown, Pennsylvania
- Length: 0.5 mi (800 m)

Pennsylvania Route 212 Truck signs are posted to direct trucks from PA 313 to eastbound PA 212 in Quakertown, avoiding the intersection between PA 212 and PA 313. From PA 313, the route runs north on 4th Street and east on Mill Street to PA 212.
