= John Eakin Farm =

- U.S. National Register of Historic Places
- U.S. Historic district
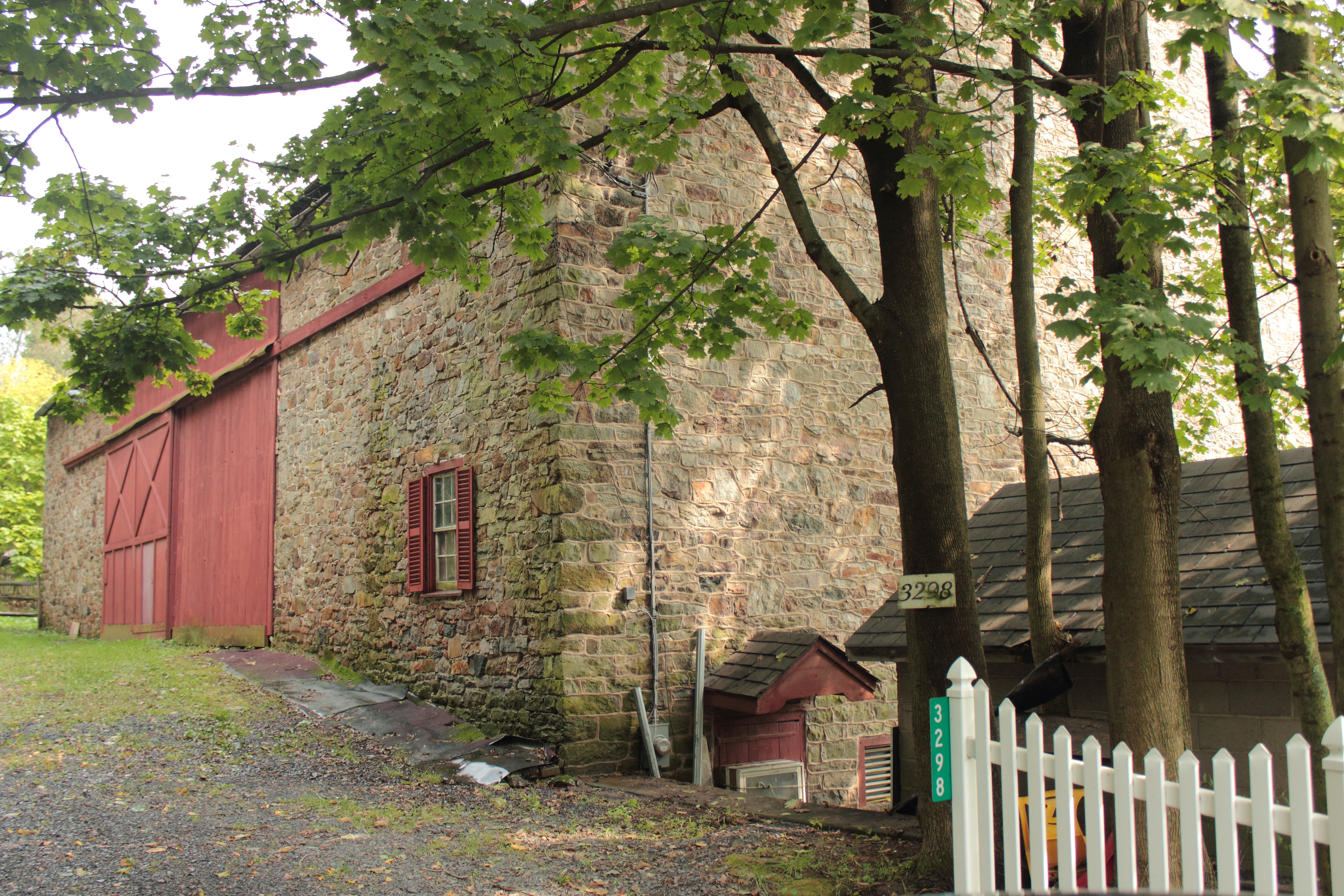
- Barn on the John Eakins Farm, September 2012

- Location within Pennsylvania Location within the United States
- Location: 3298 PA 212, Main St., Springtown, Springfield Township, Pennsylvania
- Coordinates: 40°33′05″N 75°16′57″W
- Area: 105.5 acres (42.7 ha)
- Built: 1739
- Architectural style: Penn Plan
- NRHP reference No.: 05000100
- Added to NRHP: February 24, 2005

The John Eakin Farm, also known as the Jacob Kooker Tavern, is an historic farm and national historic district that are located in Springfield Township, Bucks County, Pennsylvania.

It was added to the National Register of Historic Places in 2005.

== History and architectural features ==
This district encompasses fifteen contributing buildings, two contributing sites, and one contributing structure, including three houses, two barns, one wagon shed, two smokehouses, one spring house, one outhouse, one garage, one milk house, one chicken house, and the ruins of an out kitchen, lime quarry, lime kiln, and two sheds. The most notable building is the Jacob Kooker Tavern, the oldest section of which dates to 1739. A tavern occupied the building from 1761 to roughly 1797.
