= Bucksville, Pennsylvania =

Unincorporated community in Pennsylvania, US

- Unincorporated community
- Location within Pennsylvania
- Coordinates: 40°30′23″N 75°11′16″W
- Country: United States
- State: Pennsylvania
- County: Bucks
- Township: Nockamixon
- Elevation: 535 ft (163 m)
- Time zone: UTC-5 (Eastern (EST))
  - Summer (DST): UTC-4 (EDT)
- ZIP Code: 18942
- Area codes: 610 and 484
- GNIS feature ID: 1203183

Bucksville is an unincorporated community in Nockamixon Township in Bucks County, Pennsylvania, United States. Bucksville is located at the intersection of Pennsylvania Route 412 and Park Drive.
