= Springtown, Bucks County, Pennsylvania =

Unincorporated community in Pennsylvania, US

Springtown, Pennsylvania
- Unincorporated community
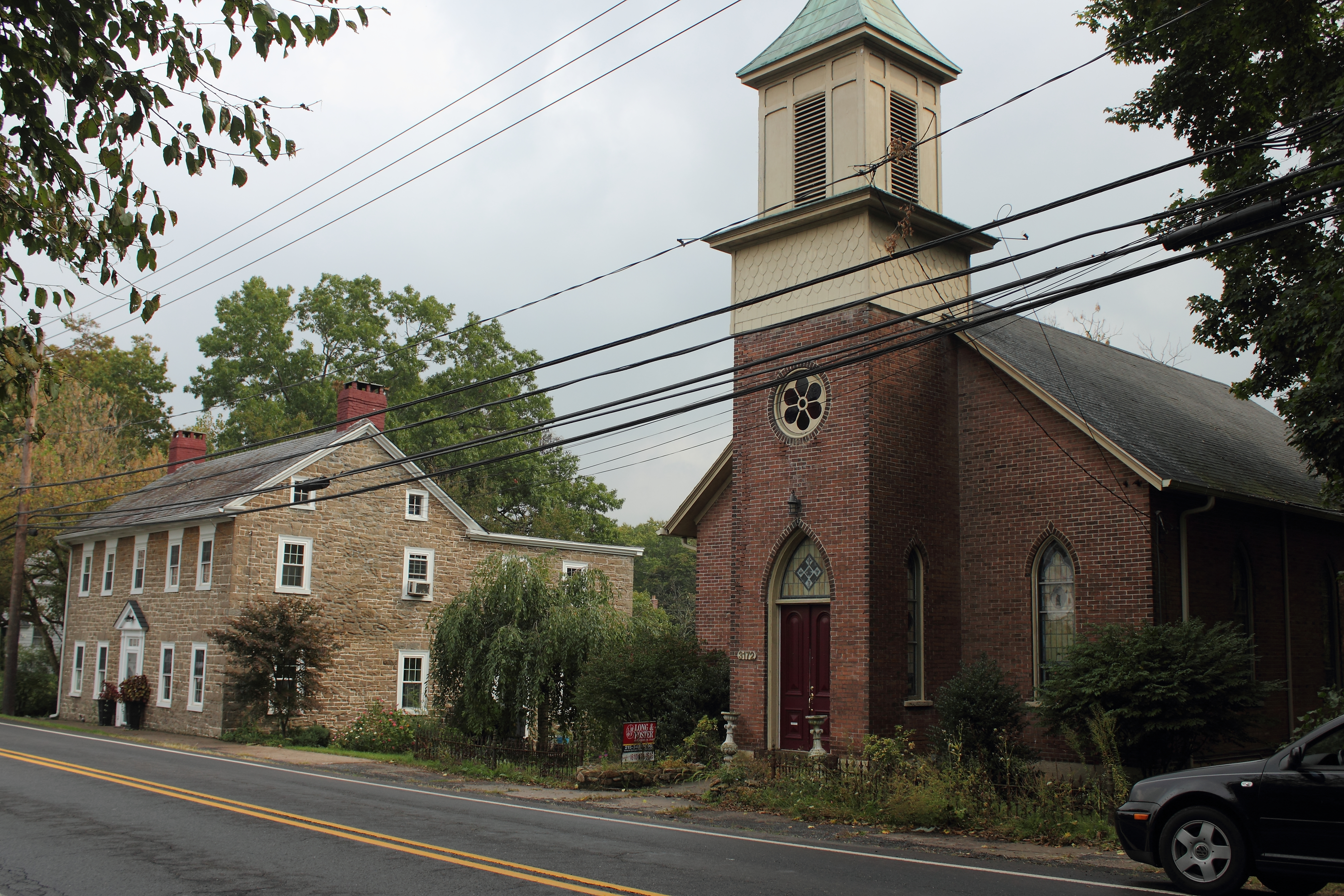
- Springtown Historic District

- Location within Pennsylvania Location within the United States
- Coordinates: 40°33′23″N 75°17′22″W
- Country: United States
- State: Pennsylvania
- County: Bucks
- Township: Springfield
- Elevation: 348 ft (106 m)

Population (2010)
  - Total: 451
- Time zone: UTC-5 (Eastern (EST))
  - Summer (DST): UTC-4 (EDT)
- ZIP Code: 18081
- Area code: 610
- GNIS feature ID: 1188307

Springtown is an unincorporated community in Springfield Township in extreme northern Bucks County, Pennsylvania. The community is located at the junction of Routes 212 and 412 and is drained by the Cooks Creek east into the Delaware River.

Springtown has two churches, and is home to the Springtown Inn. The village has its own post office, with the ZIP code 18081. Surrounding areas use the Coopersburg ZIP code of 18036 and the Hellertown ZIP code of 18055. Springtown's 346 telephone exchange is in Area Code 610.

== History ==
The community was founded by Abraham Funk with the purchase of 300 acres of land in 1763. In 1884, the population was 150, and the community was located five miles southeast of Hellertown station.

== See also ==
- Springtown, Franklin County, Pennsylvania
