= Durham Township, Pennsylvania =

Township in Pennsylvania, US

Durham Township
- Township
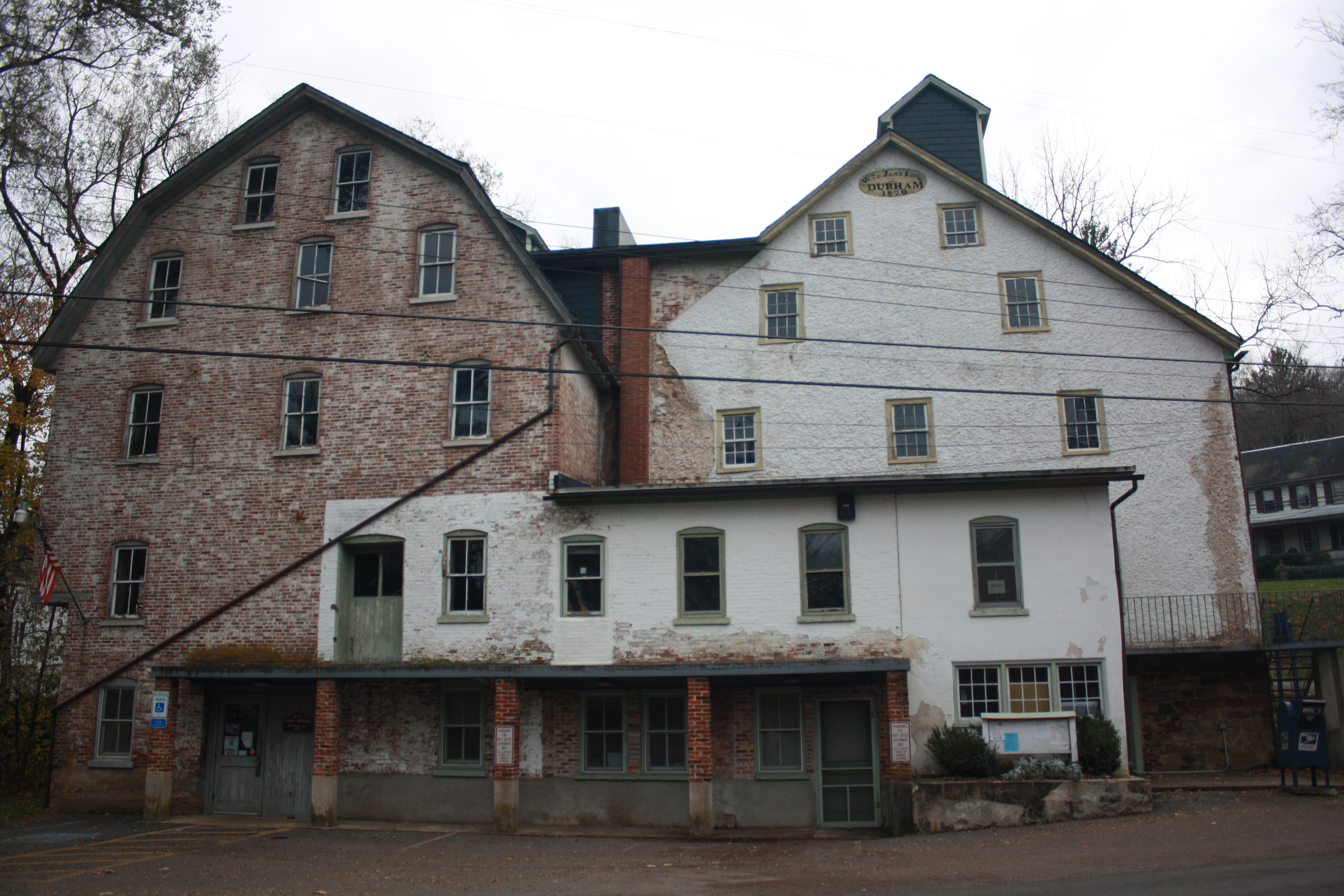
- Durham Mill, built in 1820 in the township

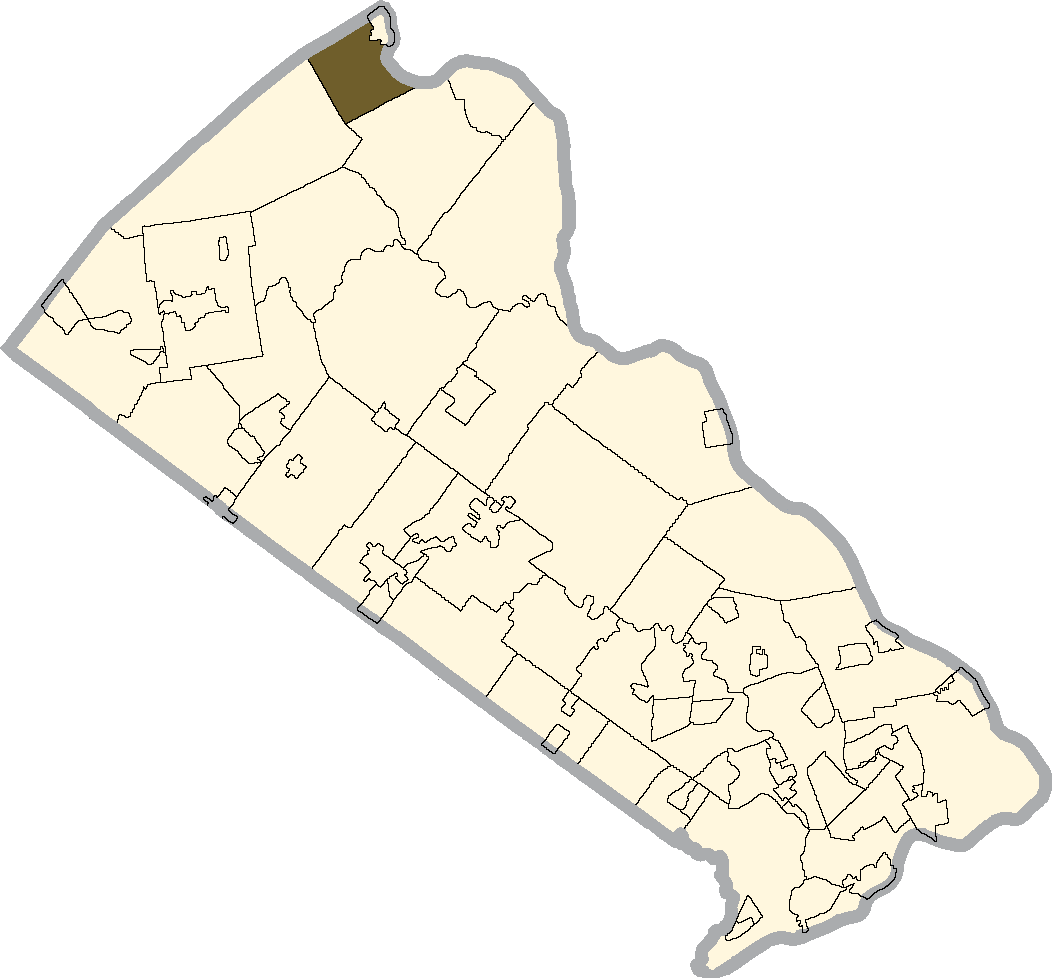
- Location of Durham Township in Bucks County, Pennsylvania

- Location in Pennsylvania and the United States Durham Township (the United States)
- Coordinates: 40°34′59″N 75°14′55″W
- Country: United States
- State: Pennsylvania
- County: Bucks
- Established: 1775

Area
  - Total: 9.37 sq mi (24.26 km^{2})
  - Land: 9.19 sq mi (23.80 km^{2})
  - Water: 0.18 sq mi (0.47 km^{2})
- Elevation: 614 ft (187 m)

Population (2020)
  - Total: 1,094
  - Density: 119.1/sq mi (45.97/km^{2})
- Time zone: UTC-5 (EST)
  - Summer (DST): UTC-4 (EDT)
- Area code: 610
- FIPS code: 42-017-20480
- Website: www.durhamtownship.org

Durham Township is a township in Bucks County, Pennsylvania, United States. The population was 1,094 at the 2020 census.

The township was first organized in 1775 and is located in the extreme north of Bucks County. It was the location of Durham Furnace, Durham Boat Company, and Durham Mills. They were known in the early 2000s for dominating Little League Baseball, and their several consecutive years where they went undefeated and won championships.

== History ==
The Durham Mill and Furnace was listed on the National Register of Historic Places in 1976.

== Geography ==
According to the United States Census Bureau, the township has a total area of 9.4 square miles (24 km^{2}), of which 9.2 square miles (24 km^{2}) is land and 0.2 square miles (0.52 km^{2}) (1.93%) is water. It is drained by the Delaware River which forms its eastern boundary with New Jersey.

Its villages include Durham, Durham Furnace, Kintnersville (also in Nockamixon Township,) Lehnenburg, Morgantown, Monroe, and Rattlesnake.

Natural features include Brandywine Creek, Chestnut Hill, Cooks Creek, Durham Cave, Durham Creek, Durham Hill, Molasses Creek, and Rodges Run.

=== Neighboring municipalities ===
- Springfield Township (west)
- Nockamixon Township (south)
- Holland Township, New Jersey (east)
- Riegelsville (northeast)
- Williams Township, Northampton County (north)
- Lower Saucon Township, Northampton County (tangent to the northwest)

== Demographics ==
Historical population
Census	Pop.	Note	%±
1930	619		—
1940	636		2.7%
1950	668		5.0%
1960	735		10.0%
1970	781		6.3%
1980	915		17.2%
1990	1,209		32.1%
2000	1,313		8.6%
2010	1,144		−12.9%
2020	1,094		−4.4%

As of the 2010 census, the township was 96.6% White, 0.3% Black or African American, 0.1% Native American, 1.0% Asian, and 0.7% were two or more races. 1.3% of the population were of Hispanic or Latino ancestry.

As of the census of 2000, there were 1,313 people, 485 households, and 382 families residing in the township. The population density was 142.6 inhabitants per square mile (55.1/km^{2}). There were 525 housing units at an average density of 57.0 per square mile (22.0/km^{2}). The racial makeup of the township was 98.17% White, 0.08% African American, 0.76% Asian, 0.23% from other races, and 0.76% from two or more races. Hispanic or Latino of any race were 1.07% of the population.

There were 485 households, out of which 34.8% had children under the age of 18 living with them, 70.5% were married couples living together, 4.5% had a female householder with no husband present, and 21.2% were non-families. 17.3% of all households were made up of individuals, and 6.4% had someone living alone who was 65 years of age or older. The average household size was 2.71 and the average family size was 3.07.

In the township the population was spread out, with 23.9% under the age of 18, 6.8% from 18 to 24, 28.1% from 25 to 44, 29.3% from 45 to 64, and 11.9% who were 65 years of age or older. The median age was 41 years. For every 100 females, there were 114.5 males. For every 100 females age 18 and over, there were 110.8 males.

The median income for a household in the township was $70,875, and the median income for a family was $73,750. Males had a median income of $51,719 versus $34,688 for females. The per capita income for the township was $29,913. 3.9% of the population and 2.7% of families were below the poverty line. Out of the total population, 3.0% of those under the age of 18 and 3.0% of those 65 and older were living below the poverty line.

== Transportation ==
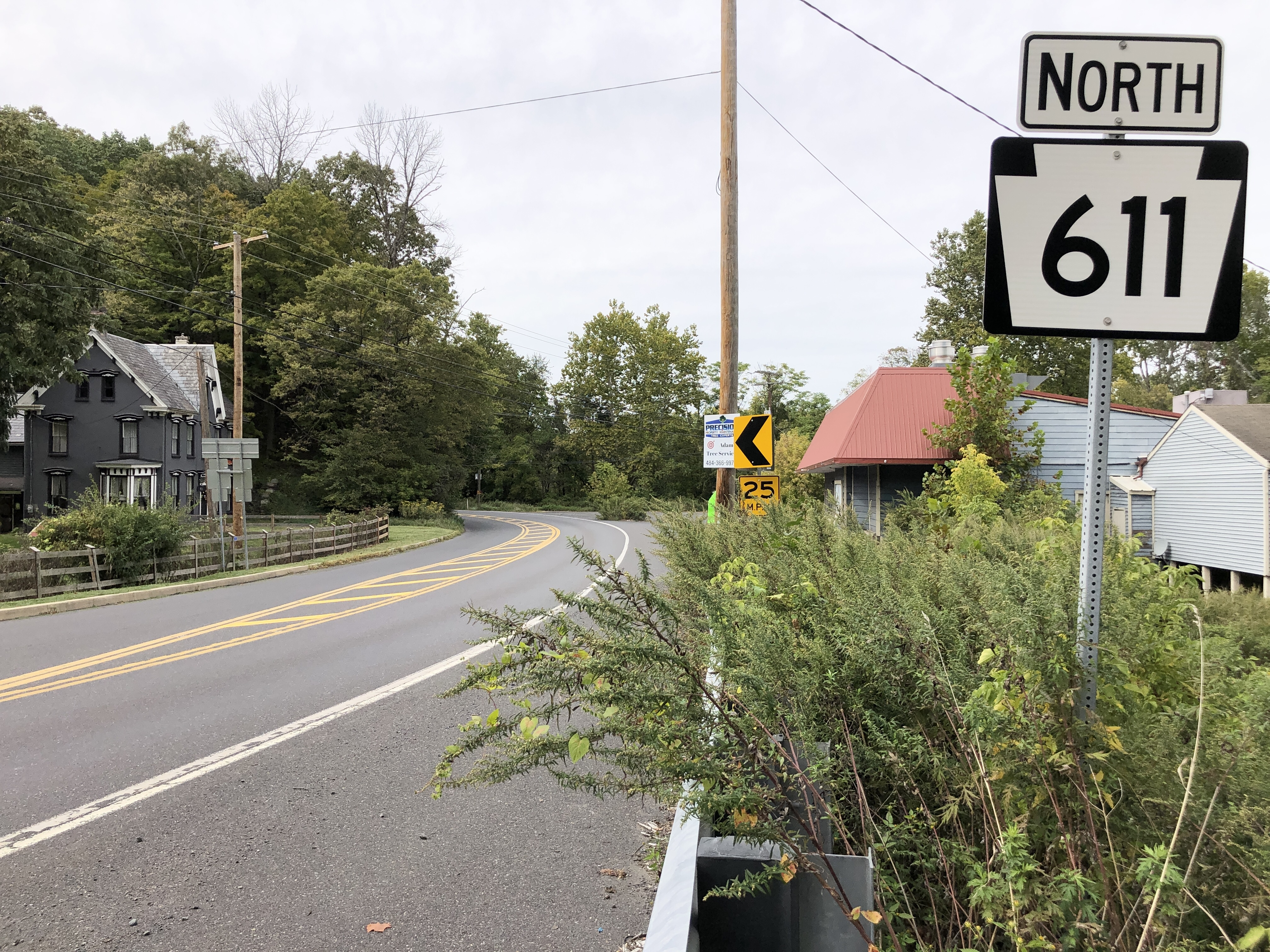
PA 611 northbound entering Durham Township

As of 2018 there were 29.70 miles (47.80 km) of public roads in Durham Township, of which 11.80 miles (18.99 km) were maintained by the Pennsylvania Department of Transportation (PennDOT) and 17.90 miles (28.81 km) were maintained by the township.

Main highways serving Durham Township include Pennsylvania Route 212 and Pennsylvania Route 611. PA 212 follows a southwest-to-northeast alignment along Durham Road through the heart of the township. Its northern terminus is at PA 611, which follows Easton Road on a north–south alignment across the eastern portion of the township.

== Climate ==
According to the Köppen climate classification system, Durham Twp has a Hot-summer, Humid continental climate (Dfa). Dfa climates are characterized by at least one month having an average mean temperature ≤ 32.0 °F (0.0 °C), at least four months with an average mean temperature ≥ 50.0 °F (10.0 °C), at least one month with an average mean temperature ≥ 71.6 °F (22.0 °C) and no significant precipitation difference between seasons. Although most summer days are slightly humid in Durham Twp, episodes of heat and high humidity can occur with heat index values > 104 °F (40 °C). Since 1981, the highest air temperature was 102.0 °F (38.9 °C) on 07/22/2011, and the highest daily average mean dew point was 73.8 °F (23.2 °C) on 08/01/2006. The average wettest month is July which corresponds with the annual peak in thunderstorm activity. Since 1981, the wettest calendar day was 6.73 inches (171 mm) on 08/27/2011. During the winter months, the average annual extreme minimum air temperature is −2.3 °F (−19.1 °C). Since 1981, the coldest air temperature was −13.5 °F (−25.3 °C) on 01/21/1994. Episodes of extreme cold and wind can occur with wind chill values < −13 °F (−25 °C). The average annual snowfall (Nov-Apr) is between 30 inches (76 cm) and 36 inches (91 cm). Ice storms and large snowstorms depositing ≥ 12 inches (30 cm) of snow occur once every few years, particularly during nor’easters from December through February.

Climate data for Durham Twp, Elevation 404 ft (123 m), 1981-2010 normals, extremes 1981-2018
Month	Jan	Feb	Mar	Apr	May	Jun	Jul	Aug	Sep	Oct	Nov	Dec	Year
Record high °F (°C)	70.5 (21.4)	78.1 (25.6)	87.8 (31.0)	94.1 (34.5)	94.2 (34.6)	95.4 (35.2)	102.0 (38.9)	99.7 (37.6)	96.7 (35.9)	89.7 (32.1)	80.7 (27.1)	73.9 (23.3)	102.0 (38.9)
Mean daily maximum °F (°C)	37.5 (3.1)	41.0 (5.0)	49.6 (9.8)	62.0 (16.7)	71.8 (22.1)	80.3 (26.8)	84.5 (29.2)	82.6 (28.1)	75.9 (24.4)	64.4 (18.0)	53.4 (11.9)	41.9 (5.5)	62.2 (16.8)
Daily mean °F (°C)	28.9 (−1.7)	31.6 (−0.2)	39.3 (4.1)	50.5 (10.3)	60.2 (15.7)	69.3 (20.7)	73.8 (23.2)	72.1 (22.3)	64.8 (18.2)	53.3 (11.8)	43.6 (6.4)	33.5 (0.8)	51.8 (11.0)
Mean daily minimum °F (°C)	20.3 (−6.5)	22.3 (−5.4)	29.1 (−1.6)	39.0 (3.9)	48.6 (9.2)	58.2 (14.6)	63.1 (17.3)	61.5 (16.4)	53.6 (12.0)	42.2 (5.7)	33.7 (0.9)	25.2 (−3.8)	41.5 (5.3)
Record low °F (°C)	−13.5 (−25.3)	−5.8 (−21.0)	1.2 (−17.1)	16.5 (−8.6)	31.9 (−0.1)	39.8 (4.3)	45.6 (7.6)	40.5 (4.7)	34.2 (1.2)	22.8 (−5.1)	8.8 (−12.9)	−2.8 (−19.3)	−13.5 (−25.3)
Average precipitation inches (mm)	3.38 (86)	2.85 (72)	3.64 (92)	4.07 (103)	4.36 (111)	4.34 (110)	5.19 (132)	4.09 (104)	4.62 (117)	4.49 (114)	3.68 (93)	4.05 (103)	48.76 (1,239)
Average relative humidity (%)	68.4	64.8	60.1	58.5	63.1	69.0	69.0	72.1	72.6	71.2	69.6	70.1	67.4
Average dew point °F (°C)	19.8 (−6.8)	21.1 (−6.1)	26.6 (−3.0)	36.5 (2.5)	47.6 (8.7)	58.7 (14.8)	63.0 (17.2)	62.6 (17.0)	55.8 (13.2)	44.2 (6.8)	34.3 (1.3)	24.8 (−4.0)	41.3 (5.2)
Source: PRISM

== Ecology ==
According to the A. W. Kuchler U.S. potential natural vegetation types, Durham Twp would have a dominant vegetation type of Appalachian Oak (104) with a dominant vegetation form of Eastern Hardwood Forest (25). The plant hardiness zone is 6b with an average annual extreme minimum air temperature of −2.3 °F (−19.1 °C). The spring bloom typically begins by April 14 and fall color usually peaks by October 26.
