= Springfield Township, Bucks County, Pennsylvania =

Township in Pennsylvania, US

Springfield Township
- Township
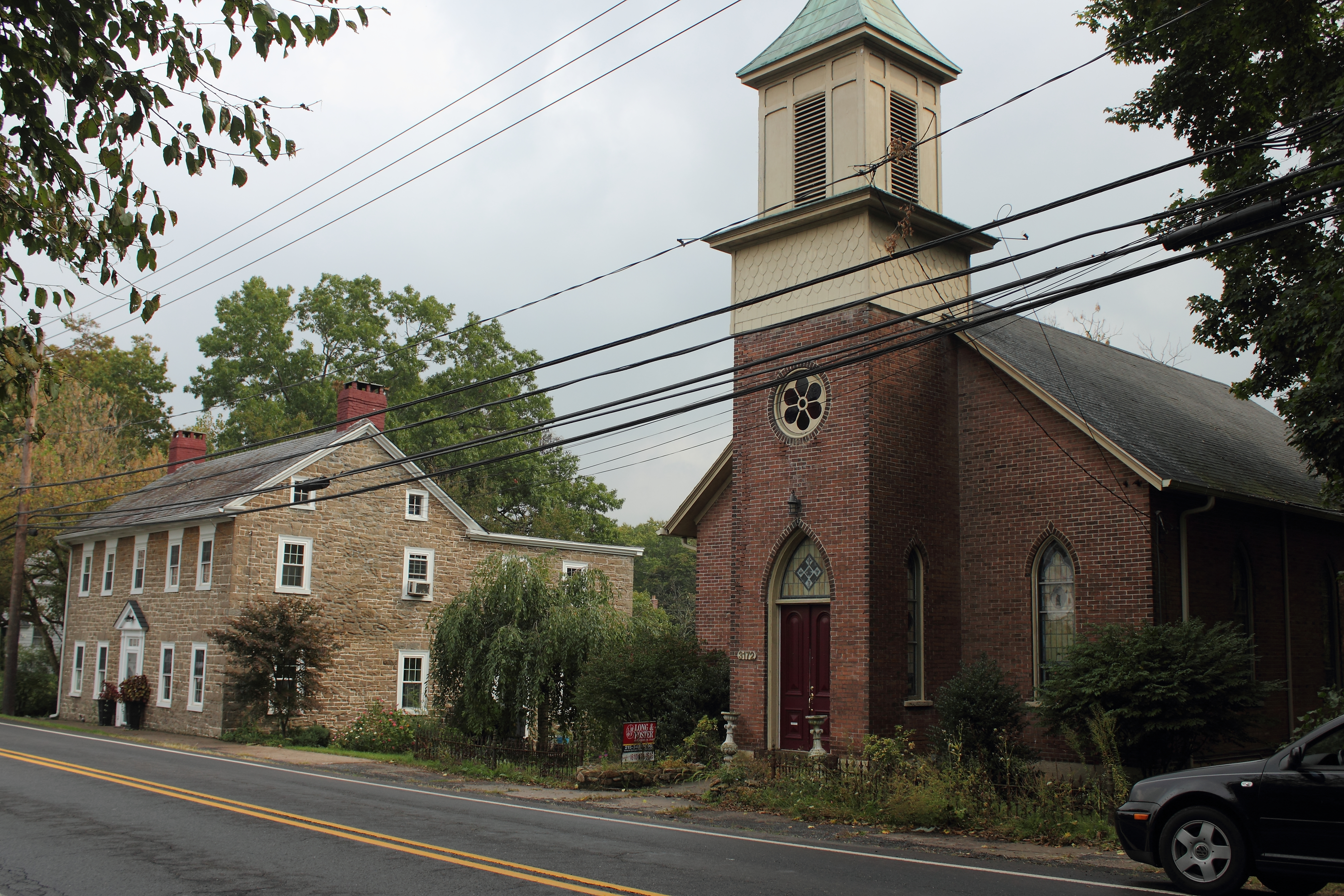
- Main Street in Springtown

- Seal

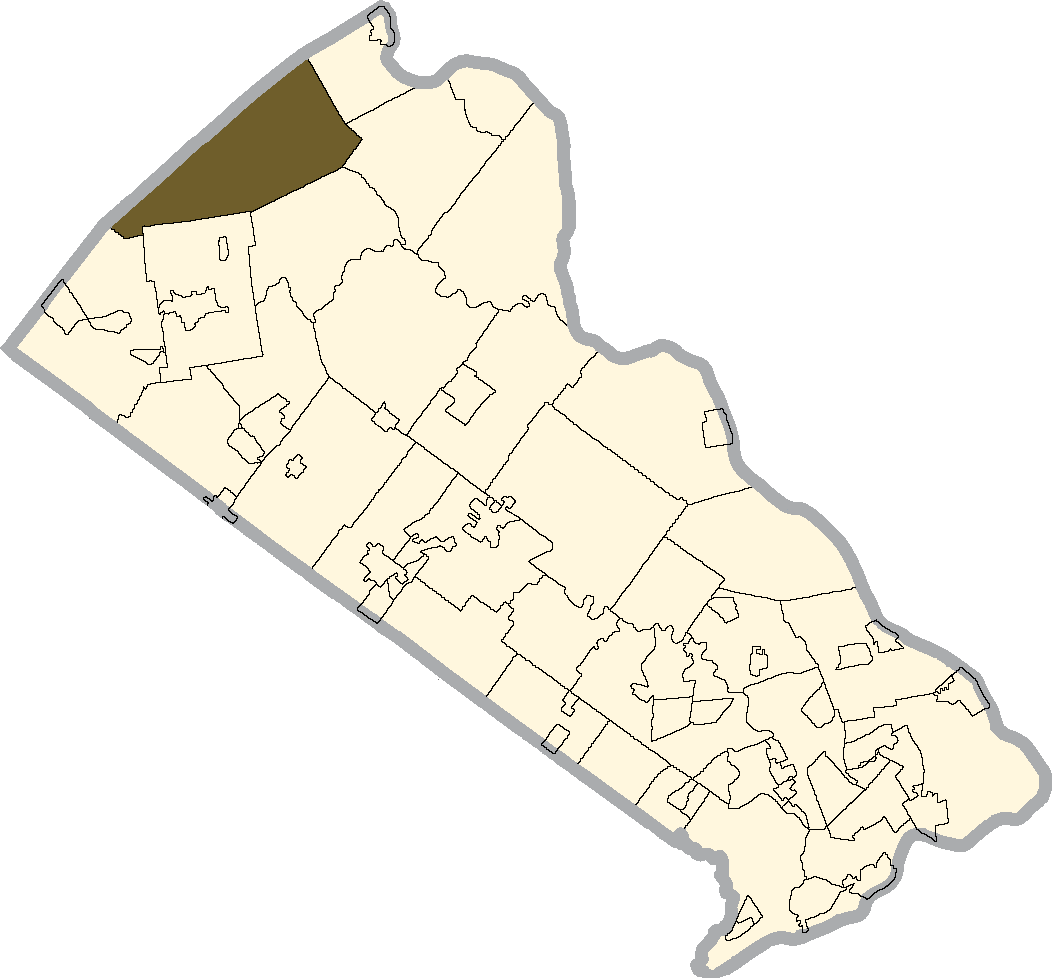
- Location of Springfield Township in Bucks County, Pennsylvania

- Location in Pennsylvania and the United States Springfield Township (the United States)
- Coordinates: 40°32′00″N 75°17′29″W
- Country: United States
- State: Pennsylvania
- County: Bucks

Area
  - Total: 30.68 sq mi (79.5 km^{2})
  - Land: 30.60 sq mi (79.3 km^{2})
  - Water: 0.08 sq mi (0.21 km^{2})
- Elevation: 459 ft (140 m)

Population (2010)
  - Total: 5,035
  - Estimate (2016): 5,031
  - Density: 164.5/sq mi (63.53/km^{2})
- Time zone: UTC-5 (EST)
  - Summer (DST): UTC-4 (EDT)
- Area codes: 215, 267, 445, 610, 484
- FIPS code: 42-017-73016
- Website: www.springfieldbucks.org

Springfield Township is a township in Bucks County, Pennsylvania, United States. The population was 5,035 at the 2010 census.

== History ==
The Jacob Funk House and Barn, John Eakin Farm, Knecht's Mill Covered Bridge, Springhouse Farm, and Springtown Historic District are listed on the National Register of Historic Places. It was also the location of the formerly listed Haupt's Mill Covered Bridge, destroyed by a fire in 1985.

== Geography ==
According to the U.S. Census Bureau, the township has a total area of 30.8 square miles (79.7 km^{2}), all land. It is located in the Delaware watershed and, while most of the township is drained directly eastward into the Delaware River by Tohickon Creek and Cooks Creek (both of which start in Springfield,) a very small area in the extreme west is drained by the Unami Creek into the Perkiomen Creek and Schuylkill River.

Springfield Township's past and present villages include Bursonville, Gallows, Gruversville, Hilltop, Passer, Pleasant Valley, Pullen, Springtown, Stony Point, and Zionhill. Many longtime residents share ties with the Saucon Valley (the nearby Coopersburg and Hellertown areas of the Lehigh Valley.) Most of the township enjoys mutual local calling with the Allentown, Bethlehem, and Easton as well as Quakertown telephone exchanges. Many township residents have Coopersburg, Quakertown or Hellertown addresses.

Natural features include Bitts Hill, Buckwampum Mountain, Cooks Creek, Cressman Hill, Gallows Hill, Gallows Run, Haycock Creek, The Lookout, Rocky Valley, Slifer Valley, Spring Garden, and Tohickon Creek.

=== Neighboring municipalities ===
- Durham Township (east)
- Nockamixon Township (southeast)
- Haycock Township (southeast)
- Richland Township (south)
- Milford Township (southwest)
- Lower Milford Township, Lehigh County (tangent to the west)
- Upper Saucon Township, Lehigh County (northwest)
- Lower Saucon Township, Northampton County (north)
- Williams Township, Northampton County (tangent to the north)

== Demographics ==
Historical population
Census	Pop.	Note	%±
1930	2,214		—
1940	2,476		11.8%
1950	2,668		7.8%
1960	3,085		15.6%
1970	3,702		20.0%
1980	4,817		30.1%
1990	5,177		7.5%
2000	4,963		−4.1%
2010	5,035		1.5%
2020	5,175		2.8%

As of the census of 2000, there were 4,963 people, 1,900 households, and 1,470 families residing in the township. The population density was 161.2 inhabitants per square mile (62.2/km^{2}). There were 1,972 housing units at an average density of 64.1 per square mile (24.7/km^{2}). The racial makeup of the township was 98.61% White, 0.60% African American, 0.10% Native American, 0.10% Asian, 0.18% from other races, and 0.40% from two or more races. Hispanic or Latino of any race were 0.87% of the population.

There were 1,900 households, out of which 30.5% had children under the age of 18 living with them, 67.3% were married couples living together, 6.4% had a female householder with no husband present, and 22.6% were non-families. 17.8% of all households were made up of individuals, and 7.2% had someone living alone who was 65 years of age or older. The average household size was 2.61 and the average family size was 2.96.

In the township the population was spread out, with 22.4% under the age of 18, 5.7% from 18 to 24, 28.4% from 25 to 44, 30.6% from 45 to 64, and 12.9% who were 65 years of age or older. The median age was 42 years. For every 100 females there were 100.3 males. For every 100 females age 18 and over, there were 101.1 males.

The median income for a household in the township was $60,061, and the median income for a family was $64,909. Males had a median income of $45,063 versus $30,592 for females. The per capita income for the township was $29,355. About 2.5% of families and 3.4% of the population were below the poverty line, including 2.5% of those under age 18 and 3.0% of those age 65 or over.

== Climate ==
According to the Köppen climate classification system, Springfield Township, Pennsylvania has a hot-summer, wet all year, humid continental climate (Dfa). Dfa climates are characterized by at least one month having an average mean temperature ≤ 32.0 °F (≤ 0.0 °C), at least four months with an average mean temperature ≥ 50.0 °F (≥ 10.0 °C), at least one month with an average mean temperature ≥ 71.6 °F (≥ 22.0 °C), and no significant precipitation difference between seasons. During the summer months, episodes of extreme heat and humidity can occur with heat index values ≥ 100 °F (≥ 38 °C). On average, the wettest month of the year is July which corresponds with the annual peak in thunderstorm activity. During the winter months, episodes of extreme cold and wind can occur with wind chill values < 0 °F (< -18 °C). The plant hardiness zone is 6b with an average annual extreme minimum air temperature of -2.4 °F (-19.1 °C). The average seasonal (Nov-Apr) snowfall total is between 30 and 36 inches (76 and 91 cm), and the average snowiest month is February which corresponds with the annual peak in nor'easter activity.

Climate data for Springfield Township, Bucks County, Pennsylvania (1981 – 2010 averages)
Month	Jan	Feb	Mar	Apr	May	Jun	Jul	Aug	Sep	Oct	Nov	Dec	Year
Mean daily maximum °F (°C)	37.5 (3.1)	41.0 (5.0)	49.5 (9.7)	61.6 (16.4)	71.5 (21.9)	80.0 (26.7)	84.1 (28.9)	82.4 (28.0)	75.6 (24.2)	64.2 (17.9)	53.3 (11.8)	41.8 (5.4)	62.0 (16.7)
Daily mean °F (°C)	28.9 (−1.7)	31.5 (−0.3)	39.3 (4.1)	50.3 (10.2)	60.0 (15.6)	69.0 (20.6)	73.5 (23.1)	71.8 (22.1)	64.5 (18.1)	53.1 (11.7)	43.5 (6.4)	33.4 (0.8)	51.7 (10.9)
Mean daily minimum °F (°C)	20.2 (−6.6)	22.1 (−5.5)	29.1 (−1.6)	38.9 (3.8)	48.5 (9.2)	58.0 (14.4)	62.8 (17.1)	61.3 (16.3)	53.4 (11.9)	42.1 (5.6)	33.6 (0.9)	25.0 (−3.9)	41.3 (5.2)
Average precipitation inches (mm)	3.41 (87)	2.84 (72)	3.65 (93)	4.12 (105)	4.32 (110)	4.41 (112)	5.05 (128)	4.06 (103)	4.62 (117)	4.39 (112)	3.74 (95)	4.04 (103)	48.65 (1,236)
Average relative humidity (%)	68.4	64.8	60.3	59.0	63.5	69.5	69.5	72.3	73.1	71.4	69.8	70.1	67.7
Average dew point °F (°C)	19.8 (−6.8)	21.0 (−6.1)	26.7 (−2.9)	36.5 (2.5)	47.6 (8.7)	58.6 (14.8)	62.9 (17.2)	62.4 (16.9)	55.7 (13.2)	44.1 (6.7)	34.3 (1.3)	24.7 (−4.1)	41.3 (5.2)
Source: PRISM Climate Group

== Transportation ==
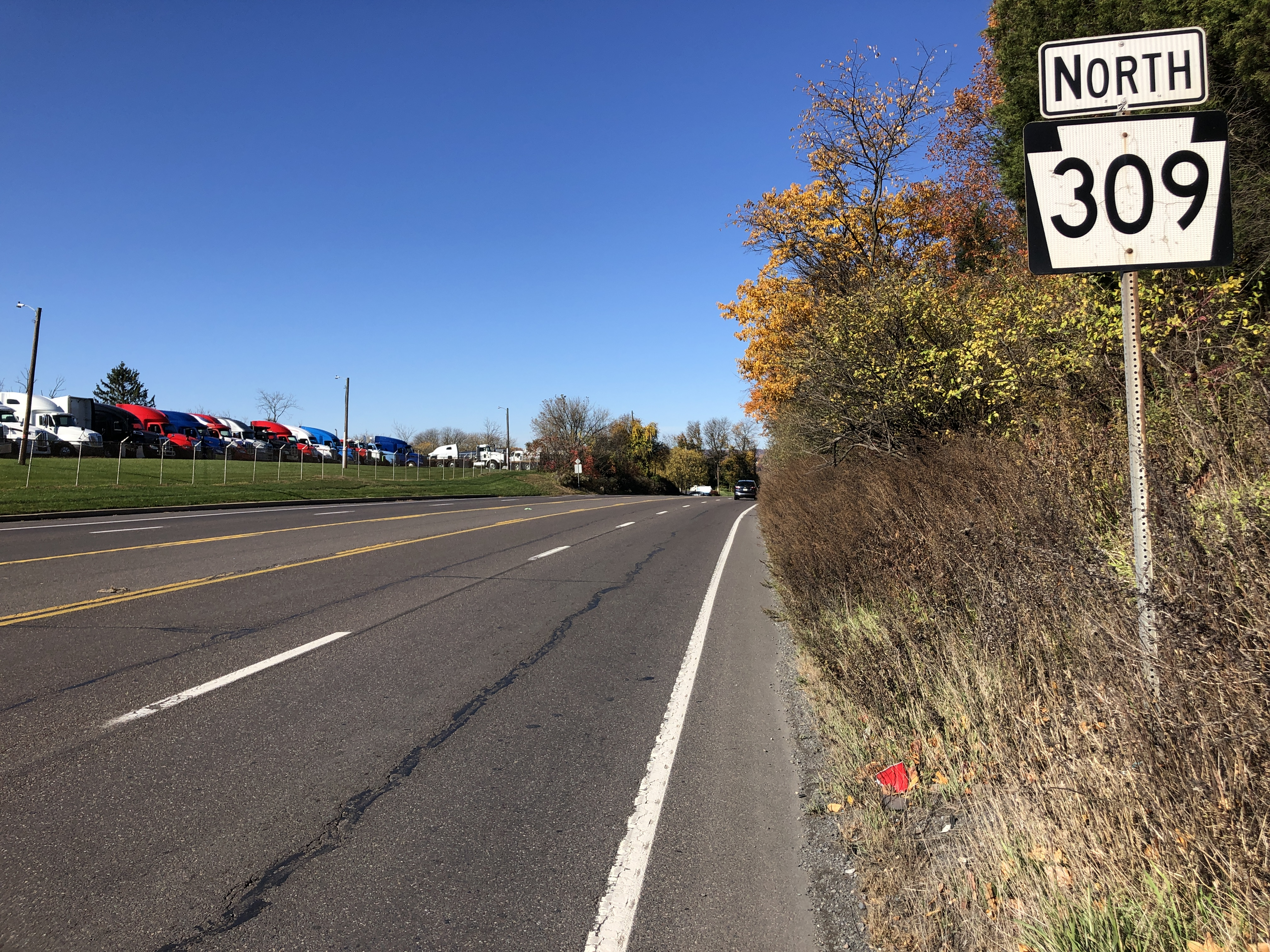
PA 309 northbound in Springfield Township

As of 2018 there were 91.56 miles (147.35 km) of public roads in Springfield Township, of which 31.36 miles (50.47 km) were maintained by the Pennsylvania Department of Transportation (PennDOT) and 60.20 miles (96.88 km) were maintained by the township.

Pennsylvania Route 309 is the most prominent highway serving Springfield Township. It follows Bethlehem Pike along a north-south alignment across the southwestern corner of the township. Pennsylvania Route 212 follows a generally southwest-to-northeast alignment across the central and northeastern portions of the township, utilizing several different roadways. Finally, Pennsylvania Route 412 does likewise as it follows an east-west alignment across the northern and eastern portions of the township. Other local roads of note include north-to-south Old Bethlehem Pike in the extreme west, Old Bethlehem Road in the southeast, and Richlandtown Pike, and east-to-west Passer Road, Peppermint Valley/Slifer Valley/Lehnenberg Road, and State Road.

== Ecology ==
According to the A. W. Kuchler U.S. potential natural vegetation types, Springfield Township, Pennsylvania would have an Appalachian Oak (104) vegetation type with an Eastern Hardwood Forest (25) vegetation form.

== Board of supervisors ==
Springfield is a second class township that elects five at-large Supervisors.

- Bill Ryker, Chairman
- Dave Long
- Raymond Kade, Vice Chairman
- Jim Hopkins
- Lorna Yearwood

== Education ==
Springfield Township is in the Palisades School District.

== Notable people ==
- Harry Danner, opera singer
- Mary Jane Fonder, convicted murderer
- Eric Knight, author of the novel Lassie Come-Home
- Toots, the dog who inspired Lassie
