= Pennsylvania House of Representatives, District 145 =

American legislative district

Pennsylvania's 145th State House of Representatives district
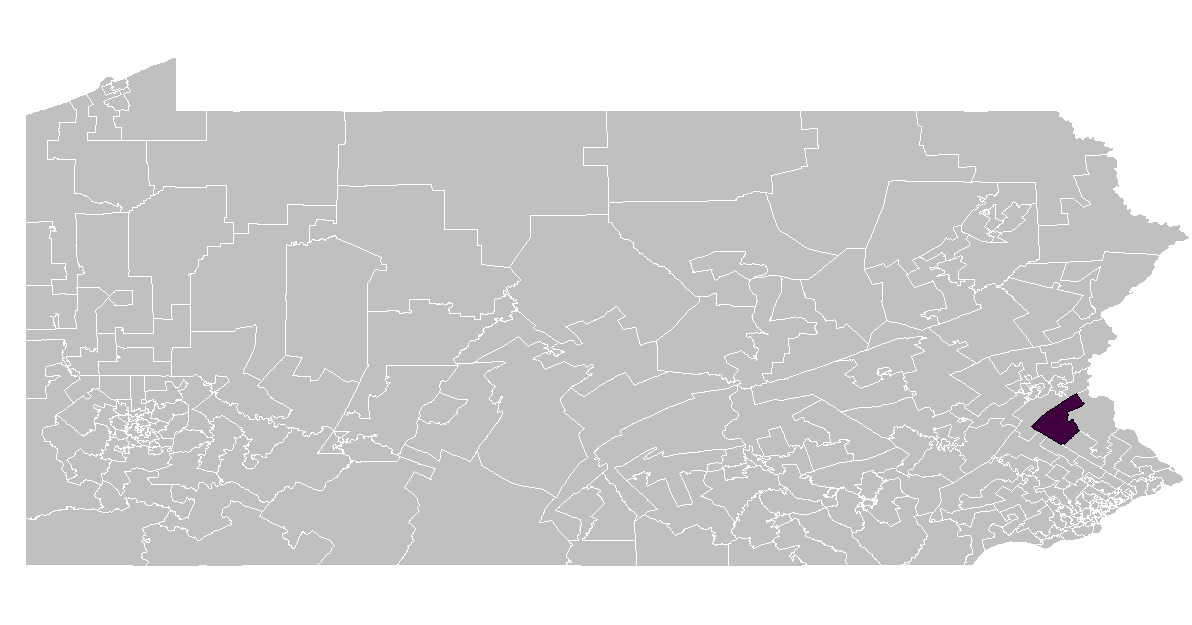
Representative
Craig Staats; R–Richland Township, Bucks County
- Demographics: 94.3% White; 1.4% Black; 3.0% Hispanic
- Population (2011) • Citizens of voting age: 62,991; 48,065

The 145th Pennsylvania House of Representatives District is located in Southeastern Pennsylvania and has been represented since 2015 by Craig Staats.

== District profile ==
The 145th Pennsylvania House of Representatives District is located in Bucks County. It is made up of the following areas:

- East Rockhill Township
- Milford Township
- Quakertown
- Richlandtown
- Richland Township
- Springfield Township
- Trumbauersville
- West Rockhill Township
- Nockamixon Township
- Durham Township
- Bridgeton Township
- Haycock Township
- Riegelsville

== Representatives ==
Representative	Party	Years	District home	Note
Before 1969, seats were apportioned by county.
Marvin D. Weidner	Republican	1969 – 1980		Died in office on July 29, 1980
Paul Clymer	Republican	1981 – 2014	Sellersville	
Craig Staats	Republican	2015 – present	Richland Township	

== Recent election results ==
PA House election, 2010: Pennsylvania House, District 145
Party	Candidate	Votes	%	±%
Republican	Paul Clymer	14,470	65.58	
Democratic	Mary Whitesell	6,559	29.73	
Margin of victory		7,911	35.85	
Turnout		21,029	100	

PA House election, 2012: Pennsylvania House, District 145
Party	Candidate	Votes	%	±%
Republican	Paul Clymer	19,692	64.71	
Democratic	Mary Whitesell	10,739	35.29	
Margin of victory		8,953	29.42	▼6.43
Turnout		30,431	100	

PA House election, 2014: Pennsylvania House, District 145
Party	Candidate	Votes	%	±%
Republican	Craig Staats	11,268	58.74	
Democratic	Karen Chellew	7,914	41.26	
Margin of victory		3,354	17.48	
Turnout		19,182	100	

PA House election, 2016: Pennsylvania House, District 145
Party	Candidate	Votes	%	±%
Republican	Craig Staats	18,695	58.30	
Democratic	Vera Cole	13,372	41.70	
Margin of victory		5,323	16.60	▼0.88
Turnout		32,067	100	
