= Beaver Run (Tohickon Creek tributary) =

Beaver Run Muddy Run
- Beaver Run

Location
- Country: United States
- State: Pennsylvania
- County: Bucks
- Township: Milford, Richland

Physical characteristics
- Source
  - coordinates: 40°25′30″N 75°22′34″W
  - elevation: 530 feet (160 m)
- Mouth
  - coordinates: 40°26′26″N 75°18′47″W
  - elevation: 479 feet (146 m)
- Length: 4.12 miles (6.63 km)

Basin features
- Progression: Beaver Run → Tohickon Creek → Delaware River → Delaware Bay
- River system: Delaware River
- Tributaries
  - left: Licking Run
- Bridges: Freier Road; Mayflower Drive; Trumbauersville Road; Pennsylvania Route 309 (South West End Boulevard); South Old Bethlehem Pike; Front Street; Pennsylvania Route 313 (East Broad Street); Nick Luca Drive

Beaver Run is a tributary of the Tohickon Creek in Milford Township and Richland Township, Bucks County, Pennsylvania in the United States and is part of the Delaware River watershed.

== History ==
Beaver Run was first called Muddy Run as indicated on a draft of a 503 acres (204 hectares) owned by John Thompson, surveyed by Samuel Foulke on 15 November 1780.

== Statistics ==
Beaver Run was added to the Geographic Names Information System on 2 August 1979 as identification number 1169032. It is listed in the Pennsylvania Gazetteer of Streams as identification number 03185. Its watershed is 5.31 square miles (13.8 km^{2}), and meets its confluence at the Tohickon Creek's 23.10 river mile.

== Course ==
Beaver Run rises in Milford Township north of the borough of Trumbauersville at an elevation of 530 feet (160 m) and is east oriented for about 0.71 miles (1.14 km) where it receives an unnamed tributary from the left, then runs east southeast then turns northeast. Soon, it makes a sharp bend to the left to flow to the north northwest then back to northeast until it receives Licking Run from the left. It then meanders more or less east until it meets the Tohickon Creek at an elevation of 479 feet (146 m) about 450 feet (140 m) upstream from Morgan Creek's confluence. The stream has an average slope of 12.38 feet per mile (2.11 meters per kilometer).

== Geology ==
- Appalachian Highlands Division
  - Piedmont Province
    - Gettysburg-Newark Lowland Section
      - Brunswick Formation

Beaver Run lies in the Brunswick Formation, a sedimentary rock laid down during the Jurassic and the Triassic, consisting of mudstone, siltstone, and green, brown, and reddish-brown shale. Mineralogy includes argillite and hornfels.

== Crossings and Bridges ==
| Crossing | NBI Number | Length | Lanes | Spans | Material/Design | Built | Reconstructed | Latitude | Longitude |
|---|---|---|---|---|---|---|---|---|---|
| Freier Road | - | - | - | - | - | - | - | - | - |
| Mayflower Drive | - | - | - | - | - | - | - | - | - |
| Trumbauersville Road | 43237 | 7 metres (23 ft) | 2 | 1 | concrete Arch-Deck | 2005 | - | 40°25'40.4"N | 75°21'27.41"W |
| Pennsylvania Route 309 (South West End Boulevard) | 6980 | 9 metres (30 ft) | 2 | 1 | Concrete Tee Beam | 1936 | 1963 | 40°25'34.9"N | 75°20'56.15"W |
| South Old Bethlehem Pike | 7694 | 8 metres (26 ft) | 2 | 1 | Concrete Tee Beam | 1922 | - | 40°25'49.53"N | 75°20'39.6"W |
| Front Street | - | - | - | - | - | - | - | - | - |
| Pennsylvania Route 313 (East Broad Street) | 6997 | 12 metres (39 ft) | 2 | 1 | Steel Stringer/Multi-beam or Girder | 1920 | - | 40°26'24.4"N | 75°19'36.8"W |
| Nick Luca Drive | - | - | - | - | - | - | - | - | - |
