= Morgan Creek (Tohickon Creek tributary) =

Morgan Creek Bog Run
- Morgan Creek

Location
- Country: United States
- State: Pennsylvania
- County: Bucks
- Township: Milford, Richland

Physical characteristics
- Source
  - coordinates: 40°24′26″N 75°22′28″W
  - elevation: 540 feet (160 m)
- Mouth
  - coordinates: 40°26′25″N 75°18′42″W
  - elevation: 479 feet (146 m)
- Length: 4.88 miles (7.85 km)
- Basin size: 4.54 square miles (11.8 km^{2})

Basin features
- Progression: Morgan Creek → Tohickon Creek → Delaware River → Delaware Bay
- River system: Delaware River
- Bridges: Allentown Road (South Main Street); Scholls School Road; Pennsylvania Route 309 (South West End Boulevard); South Old Bethlehem Pike; Pennsylvania Route 313 (Doylestown Pike)

Morgan Creek is a tributary of the Tohickon Creek in Bucks County, Pennsylvania in the United States, rising in Milford Township and empties into the Tohickon in Richland Township east of Quakertown.

== History ==
The stream was originally named Bog Run as it was indicated so on a draft of Elizabeth Galloway's land in 1781 and a number of other drafts by Samuel Foulke about the same time. It was named so because it ran through the wetlands today known as the Quakertown Swamp. The origin of the name Morgan Creek is unknown, but, it may have referred to General Daniel Morgan.

== Statistics ==
The Geographic Names Information System identification is 1181545. The Pennsylvania Gazetteer of Streams' identification is 03184. Morgan Creek has a watershed of 4.54 square miles (11.8 km^{2}). The elevation of the source is approximately 530 feet (160 m) and the elevation at the mouth is 479 feet (146 m) and it meets its confluence at the Tohickon Creek's 23.0 river mile.

== Course ==
Morgan Creek rises in Milford Township just south of Trumbauersville at an elevation of 540 feet (160 m) and flows toward the east and slowly curves to the northeast by the time it drains into the Tohickon at an elevation of 479 feet (146 m). The stream has an average slope of 12.5 feet per mile (1.78 meters per kilometer).

== Geology ==
- Appalachian Highlands Division
  - Piedmont Province
    - Gettysburg-Newark Lowland Section
      - Brunswick Formation

The course of Morgan Run lies in the Brunswick Formation laid down during the Jurassic and the Triassic and consists of mudstone, siltstone, along with reddish-brown, green, and brown shale. Mineralogy includes argillite and hornfels.

== Crossings and Bridges ==
Crossing	NBI Number	Length	Lanes	Spans	Material/Design	Built	Reconstructed	Latitude	Longitude
Allentown Road (South Main Street)	-	-	-	-	-	-	-	-	-
Scholls School Road	7637	9 metres (30 ft)	2	2	Concrete culvert	1974	-	40°24'32.9"N	75°21'15.9"W
Pennsylvania Route 309 (South West End Boulevard)	6979	10 metres (33 ft)	2	1	Concrete Tee Beam	1936	1963	40°24'46.7"N	75°20'31"W
South Old Bethlehem Pike	7638	9 metres (30 ft)	2	1	Concrete Tee Beam	1922	1970	40°24'53.62"N	75°20'16"W
Pennsylvania Route 313 (Doylestown Pike)	6996	17 metres (56 ft)	2	2	Concrete Tee Beam	1930	-	40°26'17.1"N	75°18'54.5"W
