= Finland, Pennsylvania =

Unincorporated community in Pennsylvania, U.S.

Coordinates: 40°23′03″N 75°25′10″W

Finland is a village and an unincorporated community on the Unami Creek in southern Milford Township, Bucks County, Pennsylvania, United States. It is split between the Green Lane Zip Code of 18054 and the Pennsburg zip code of 18073. The immediate area was known in the 1920s as the "Poconos of Philadelphia" and as "The Fineland," and it is from this latter name that the US post office had put it on the map as Finland in 1886. Multiple summer camps have been located in this area and one of them is still in use. The Unami Creek flows southward to the Perkiomen Creek. The village was established by Finnish immigrants to New Sweden.
