= Swamp Creek Road Bridge =

- U.S. National Register of Historic Places
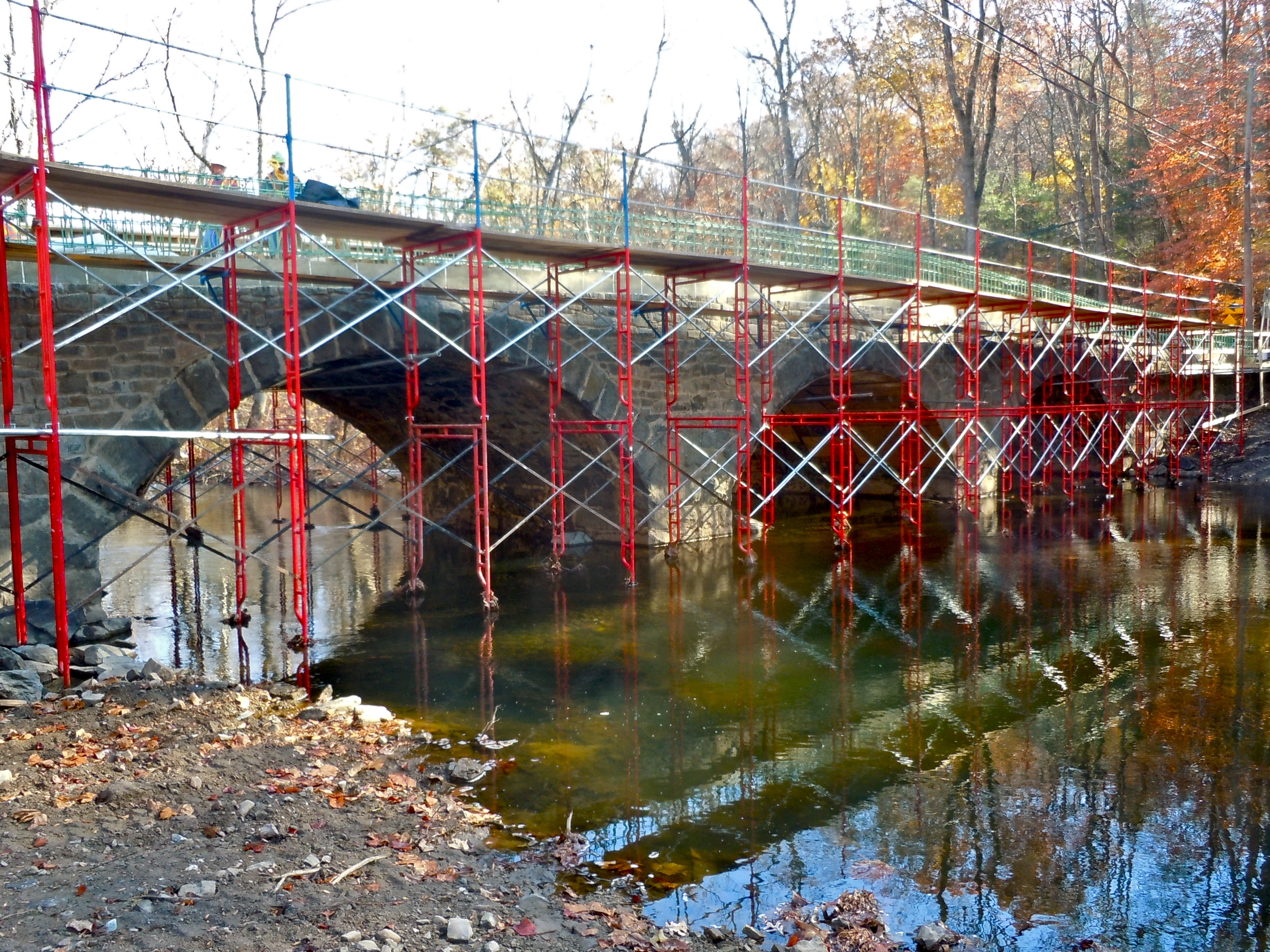
- Swamp Creek Bridge, November 2011

- Location within Pennsylvania Location within the United States
- Location: Swamp Creek Road over Unami Creek, near Sumneytown, Marlborough Township, Pennsylvania
- Coordinates: 40°20′3″N 75°26′59″W
- Area: less than one acre
- Built: 1892
- Built by: Thomas M. Adams
- Architectural style: Multi-span stone arch
- MPS: Highway Bridges Owned by the Commonwealth of Pennsylvania, Department of Transportation TR
- NRHP reference No.: 88000860
- Added to NRHP: June 22, 1988

Swamp Creek Road Bridge is a historic stone arch bridge located near Sumneytown in Marlborough Township, Montgomery County, Pennsylvania. The bridge was built in 1892. It has three spans totaling 76-foot-long (23 m) with an overall length of 125-foot (38 m). The bridge crosses Unami Creek.

It was listed on the National Register of Historic Places in 1988.
