= Sutch Road Bridge in Marlborough Township =

- U.S. National Register of Historic Places
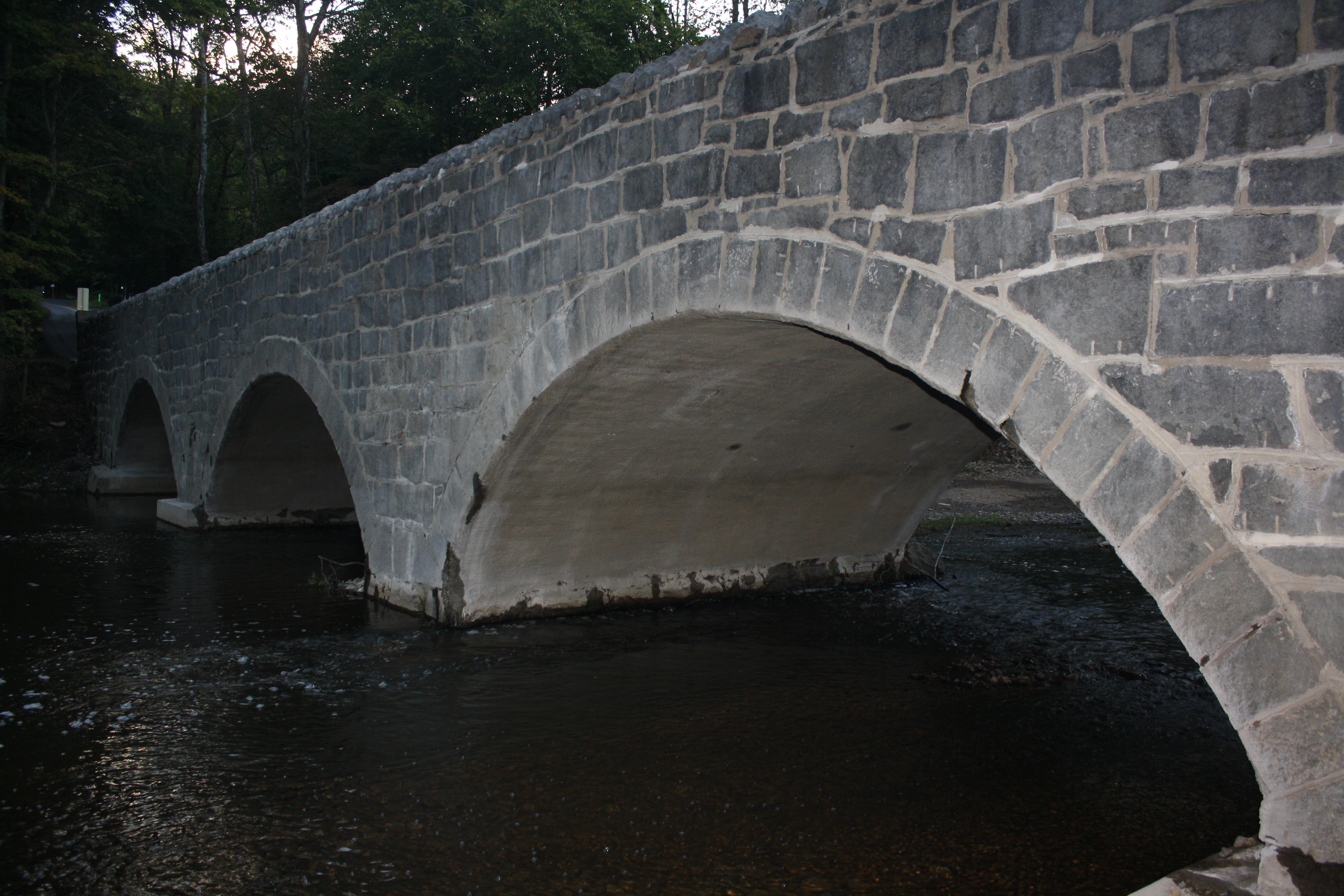
- Sutch Road Bridge. September 2012.

- Location within Pennsylvania Location within the United States
- Location: Sutch Road over Unami Creek near Milford in Marlborough Township, Pennsylvania
- Coordinates: 40°22′4″N 75°25′24″W
- Area: less than one acre
- Built: 1910
- Built by: James M. Smith
- Architectural style: Multi-span stone arch
- MPS: Highway Bridges Owned by the Commonwealth of Pennsylvania, Department of Transportation TR
- NRHP reference No.: 88000859
- Added to NRHP: June 22, 1988

Sutch Road Bridge is a historic stone arch bridge located near Milford in Marlborough Township, Montgomery County, Pennsylvania. The bridge was built in 1910. It has three spans totaling 76-foot-long (23 m) with an overall length of 125-foot (38 m). The bridge crosses Unami Creek.

It was listed on the National Register of Historic Places in 1988.
