= Marlborough Township, Pennsylvania =

Township in Pennsylvania, US

Marlborough Township
- Township
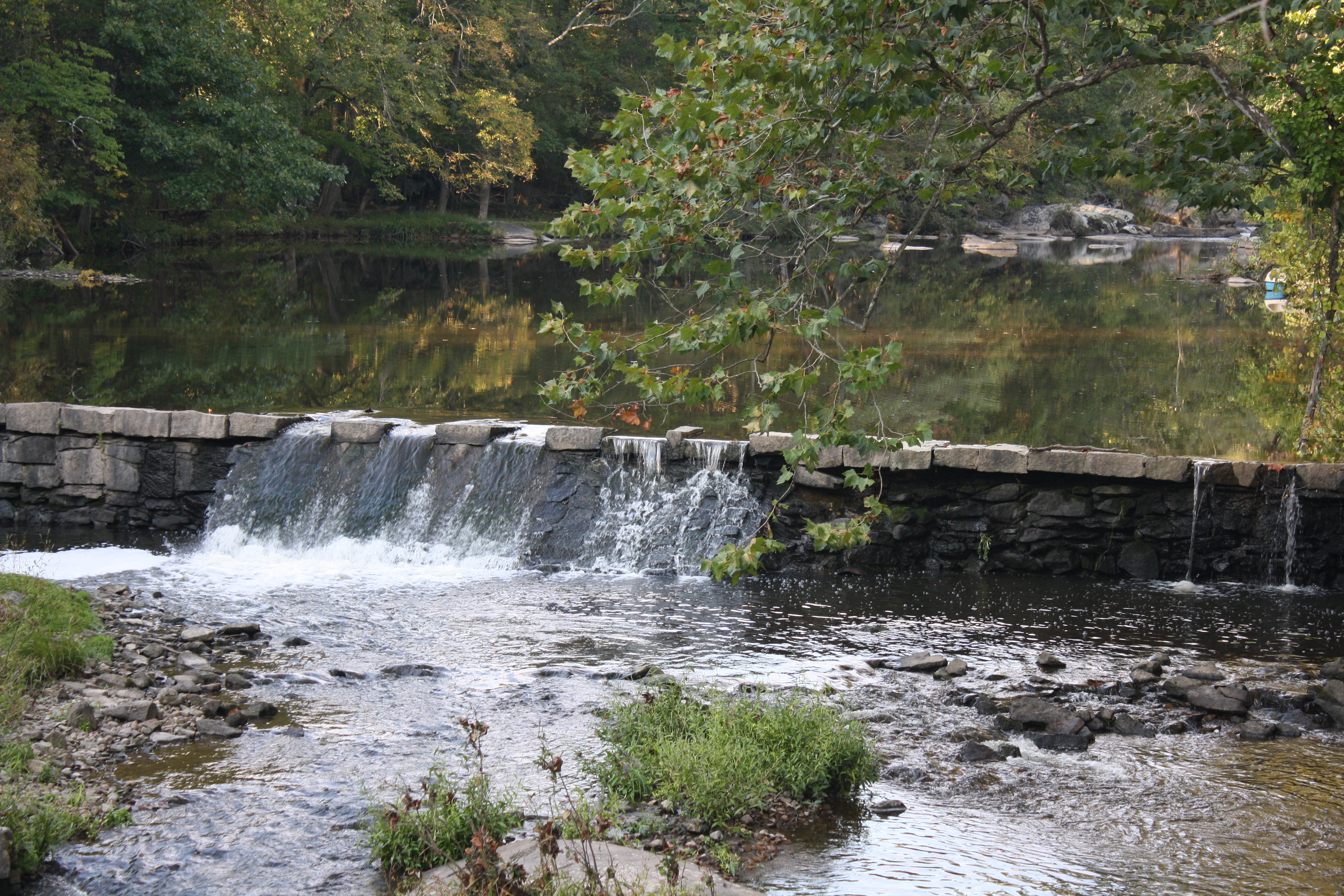
- Unami Creek at Swamp Creek Road

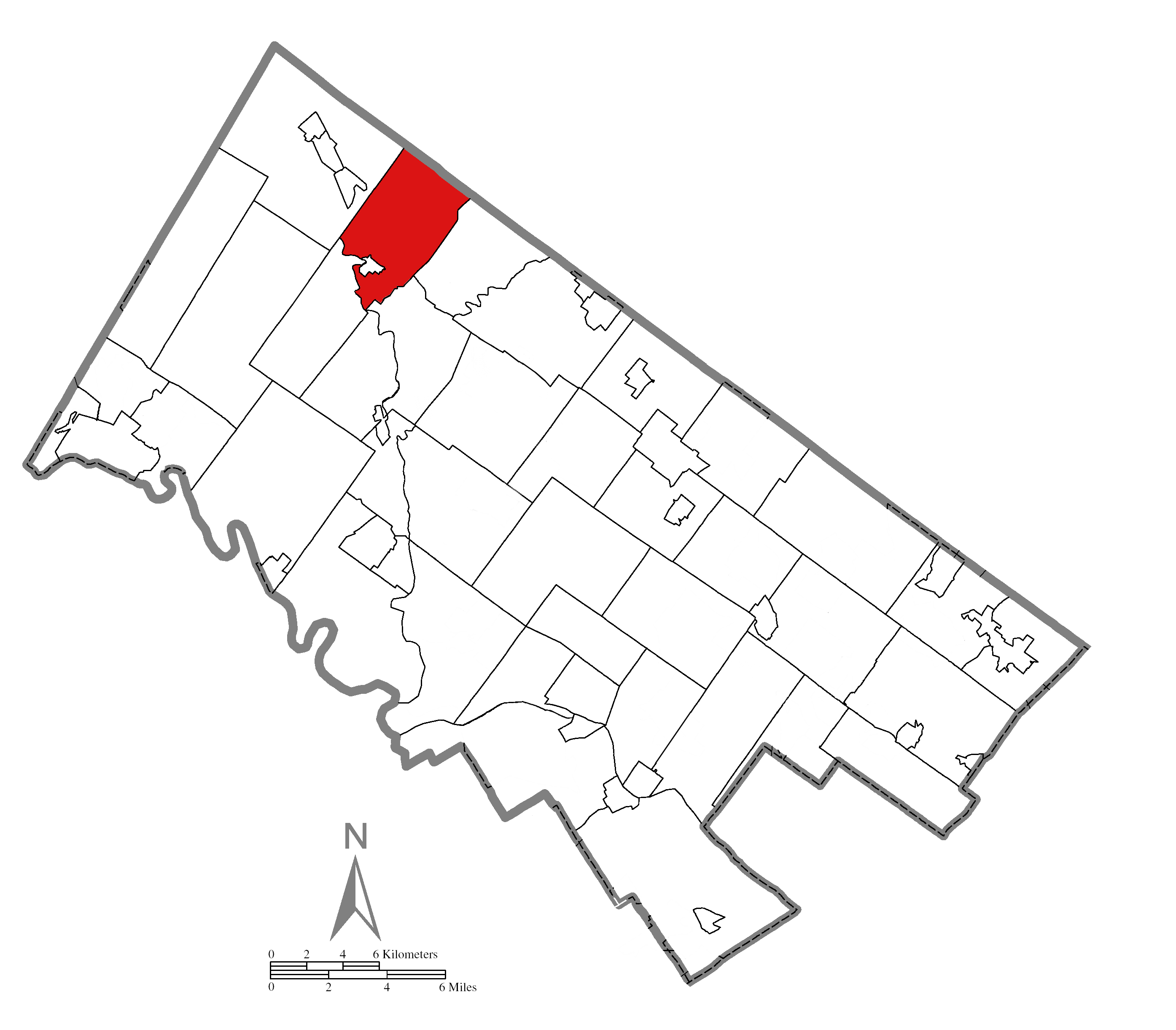
- Location of Marlborough Township in Montgomery County
- Coordinates: 40°23′00″N 75°25′59″W
- Country: United States
- State: Pennsylvania
- County: Montgomery
- Township of Marlboro: 1741
- Township of Marlborough: after 1940

Area
  - Total: 12.38 sq mi (32.1 km^{2})
  - Land: 12.21 sq mi (31.6 km^{2})
  - Water: 0.17 sq mi (0.44 km^{2})
- Elevation: 643 ft (196 m)

Population (2010)
  - Total: 3,178
  - Estimate (2016): 3,324
  - Density: 260.3/sq mi (100.5/km^{2})
- Time zone: UTC-5 (EST)
  - Summer (DST): UTC-4 (EDT)
- ZIP codes: 18054, 18073, 18074, 18084
- Area codes: 215, 267, and 445
- FIPS code: 42-091-47592
- Website: sites.google.com/site/marlboroughpaorg/home

Marlborough Township is a township in Montgomery County, Pennsylvania, United States. The population was 3,178 at the 2010 census.

It is part of the Upper Perkiomen School District.

== History ==
In 1741, Marlboro Township was partitioned from the original Salford Township. At some point in time after the 1940 U.S. Federal Census, the township was officially renamed Marlborough Township. Some historical and genealogical references retain the early spelling of the community.

The Bauern Freund Print Shop, Andreas Rieth Homestead, Sutch Road Bridge in Marlborough Township, and Swamp Creek Road Bridge are listed on the National Register of Historic Places.

== Geography ==
According to the United States Census Bureau, the township has a total area of 12.7 square miles (32.9 km^{2}), of which 12.5 square miles (32.5 km^{2}) is land and 0.2 square mile (0.4 km^{2}) (1.34%) is water. It is drained by the Perkiomen Creek into the Schuylkill River and consists mainly of rolling hills and valleys.

The township has a hot-summer humid continental climate (Dfa) and is in hardiness zones 6b and 7a. Average temperatures at the municipal building on Upper Ridge Road range from 29.7 °F in January to 74.3 °F in July.

Its villages include Hoppenville, Perkiomenville (also in Upper Frederick), Sumneytown, and Woxall (also in Upper Salford). Its numbered routes are 29 and 63, the latter of which has its northwestern terminus on north-to-south 29 in Green Lane. Other local roads of note include Finland Road, Geryville Pike, Hoppenville Road, Knight Road, Swamp Creek Road, and Upper Ridge Road.

=== Adjacent municipalities ===
- Upper Hanover Township (northwest)
- Upper Frederick Township (southwest)
- Green Lane (west)
- Lower Frederick Township (tangent to the south)
- Upper Salford Township (south)
- Salford Township (southeast)
- West Rockhill Township, Bucks County (east)
- Milford Township, Bucks County (northeast)

== Transportation ==
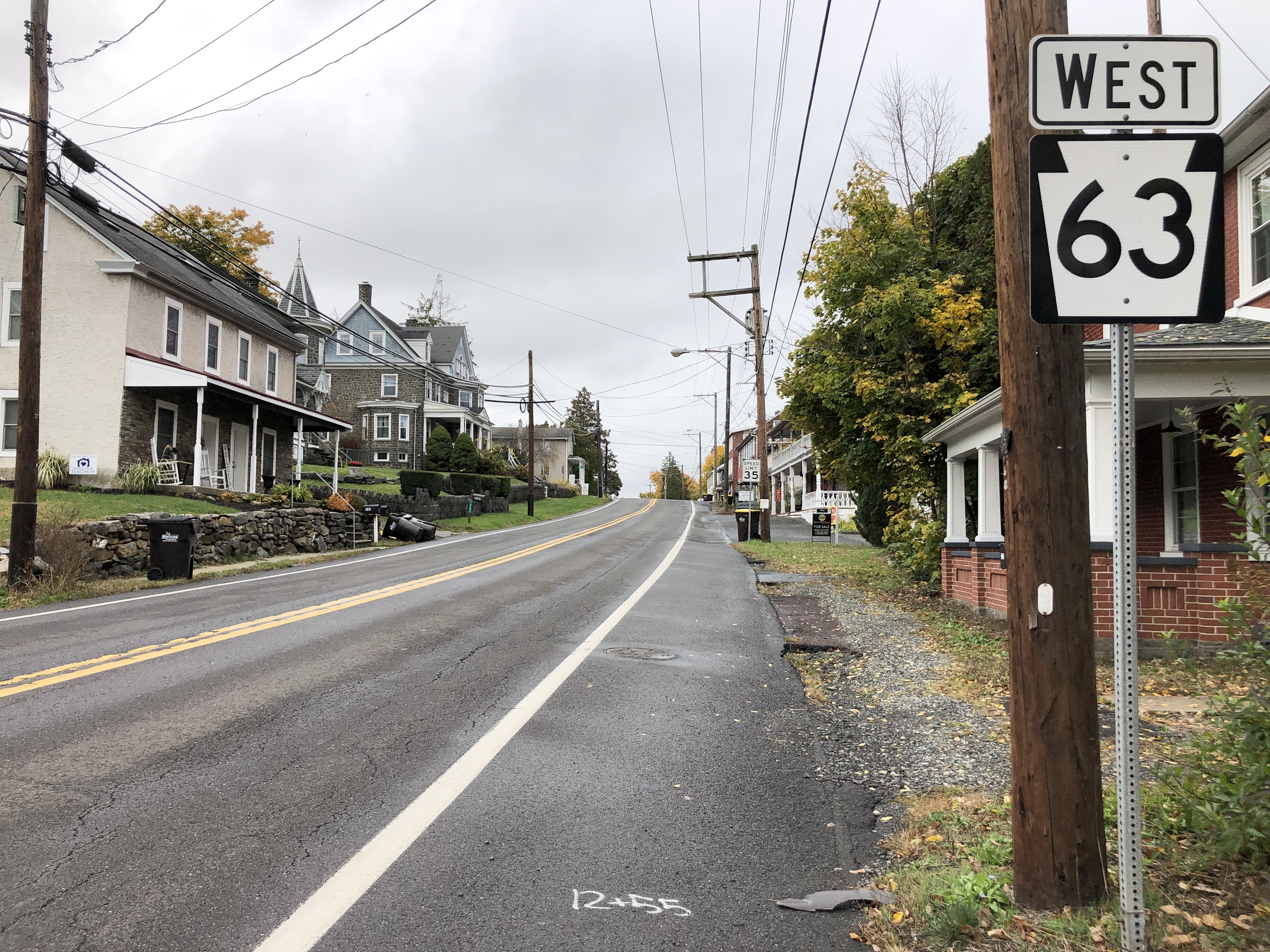
PA 63 westbound in Marlborough Township

As of 2018 there were 42.62 miles (68.59 km) of public roads in Marlborough Township, of which 21.68 miles (34.89 km) were maintained by the Pennsylvania Department of Transportation (PennDOT) and 20.94 miles (33.70 km) were maintained by the township.

Pennsylvania Route 29 and Pennsylvania Route 63 are the primary highways serving Marlborough Township. PA 29 follows Gravel Pike along a north-south alignment across the southwestern portion of the township, while PA 63 follows an east-west alignment along Main Street in the southeastern section of the township.

== Demographics ==
Historical population
Census	Pop.	Note	%±
1930	966		—
1940	1,138		17.8%
1950	1,432		25.8%
1960	1,875		30.9%
1970	2,465		31.5%
1980	2,849		15.6%
1990	3,116		9.4%
2000	3,104		−0.4%
2010	3,178		2.4%
2020	3,520		10.8%

As of the 2010 census, the township was 97.4% White, 1.0% Black or African American, 0.2% Native American, 0.2% Asian, and 1.0% were two or more races. 1.2% of the population were of Hispanic or Latino ancestry.

As of the census of 2000, there were 3,104 people, 1,174 households, and 888 families residing in the township. The population density was 247.6 inhabitants per square mile (95.6/km^{2}). There were 1,222 housing units at an average density of 97.5 per square mile (37.6/km^{2}). The racial makeup of the township was 97.55% White, 0.71% African American, 0.13% Native American, 0.16% Asian, 0.64% from other races, and 0.81% from two or more races. Hispanic or Latino of any race were 1.10% of the population.

There were 1,174 households, out of which 32.5% had children under the age of 18 living with them, 67.0% were married couples living together, 6.1% had a female householder with no husband present, and 24.3% were non-families. 19.8% of all households were made up of individuals, and 6.9% had someone living alone who was 65 years of age or older. The average household size was 2.63 and the average family size was 3.06.

In the township the population was spread out, with 23.6% under the age of 18, 6.6% from 18 to 24, 28.1% from 25 to 44, 28.9% from 45 to 64, and 12.8% who were 65 years of age or older. The median age was 40 years. For every 100 females there were 99.0 males. For every 100 females age 18 and over, there were 98.3 males.

The median income for a household in the township was $60,170, and the median income for a family was $68,750. Males had a median income of $47,188 versus $31,667 for females. The per capita income for the township was $26,273. About 0.8% of families and 2.3% of the population were below the poverty line, including 0.7% of those under age 18 and 5.3% of those age 65 or over.

== Government and politics ==
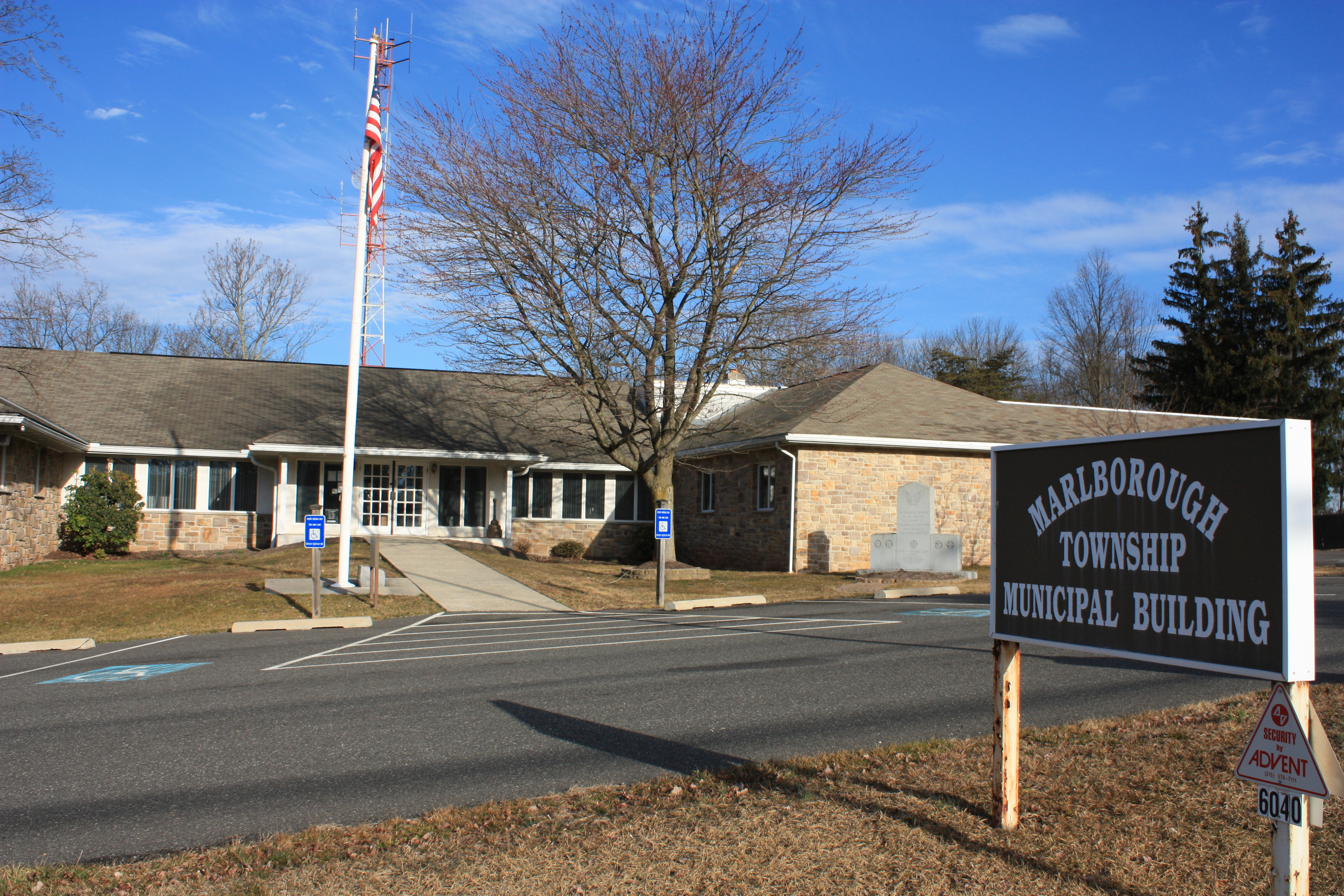
Marlborough Township Building

Presidential elections results
Year	Republican	Democratic
2020	59.2% 1,308	39.0% 861
2016	60.3% 1,136	35.4% 668
2012	56.6% 945	41.6% 694
2008	50.3% 838	48.5% 809
2004	53.2% 838	45.8% 721
2000	53.8% 655	40.9% 498
1996	46.0% 516	37.8% 424
1992	39.5% 492	34.5% 430

Marlborough Township has a Township Manager and a 3-person Board of Supervisors.
