= Marvin Weidner =

American politician

Marvin D. Weidner

Member of the Pennsylvania House of Representatives from the 145th district
- In office 1969 – July 29, 1980
- Preceded by: District created
- Succeeded by: Paul Clymer

Member of the Pennsylvania House of Representatives from the Bucks County district
- In office 1967–1968

Personal details
- Born: August 29, 1911 Telford, Pennsylvania
- Died: July 29, 1980 (aged 68) Telford, Pennsylvania
- Party: Republican

Marvin D. Weidner (August 29, 1911 – July 29, 1980) was a former Republican member of the Pennsylvania House of Representatives.
