= Dry Branch Creek (Tohickon Creek tributary) =

- Dry Branch Creek

Location
- Country: United States
- State: Pennsylvania
- County: Bucks
- Township: Richland

Physical characteristics
- Source
  - coordinates: 40°29′46″N 75°16′49″W
  - elevation: 560 feet (170 m)
- Mouth
  - coordinates: 40°26′29″N 75°18′49″W
  - elevation: 480 feet (150 m)
- Length: 4.52 miles (7.27 km)
- Basin size: 3.95 square miles (10.2 km^{2})

Basin features
- Progression: Dry Branch Creek → Tohickon Creek → Delaware River → Delaware Bay
- River system: Delaware River
- Bridges: Pennsylvania Route 212 (Church Road), Meadow Road, West Sawmill Road, Beck Road, Union Road, Raub Road

Dry Branch Creek is a tributary of the Tohickon Creek in Richland Township, Bucks County, Pennsylvania in the United States. Dry Branch is part of the Delaware River watershed.

== Statistics ==
Dry Branch Creek rises at an elevation of 560 feet (170 m) and meets the Tohickon Creek at an elevation of 480 feet (150 m). The length is 4.5 miles (7.2 km). That gives the creek an average slope of 17.7 feet (5.4 m) per mile (km).

== Course ==
Dry Branch Creek rises in the upper portion of Haycock Township at an elevation of 560 feet (170 m) and flows to the southwest for about 3.25 miles (5.23 km) where it receives a tributary from the right bank, then another mile or so where it meets its confluence with the Tohickon Creek at an elevation of 480 feet (150 m). Its average slope is 17.7 feet per mile (2.75 meters per kilometers). In a study conducted in 2001 by the Pennsylvania Department of Conservation and Natural Resources Rivers Conservation Program, Dry Branch Creek was found to be impaired in condition and caused extensive flooding during severe storms at the Raub Road crossing.

== Stream progression ==
- Dry Branch Creek
  - Tohickon Creek
    - Delaware River

== Crossings and bridges ==
- Erie Road
- Raub Road
- Union Road
- Beck Road
- West Sawmill Road
- Meadow Road
- Pennsylvania Route 212 (Church Road)
