= Fries's Rebellion =

Tax revolt of Pennsylvania Dutch farmers in 1799

Fries' Rebellion
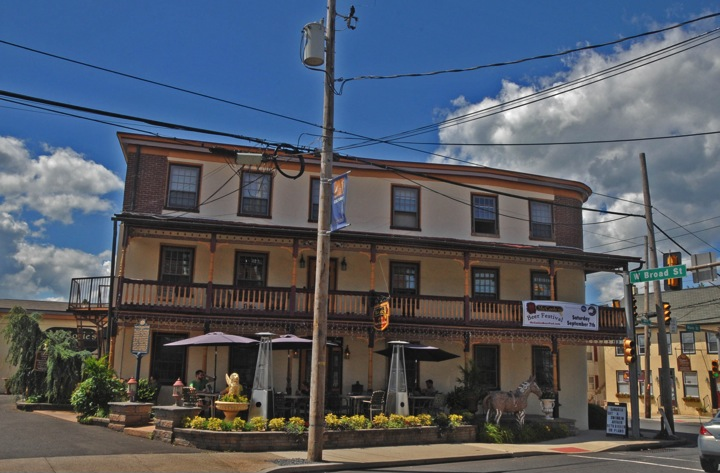
- Historical marker is in front of McCoole's, previously known as the Red Lion Inn in Quakertown, Pennsylvania, a central point of Fries's Rebellion
- Date: 1799–1800
- Location: Pennsylvania, United States
- Outcome: Rebellion suppressed

Pennsylvania Historical Marker
- Designated: 2003

Fries's Rebellion (/friːz/), also called House Tax Rebellion, the Home Tax Rebellion and, in Pennsylvania German, the Heesses-Wasser Uffschtand, was a tax revolt among Pennsylvania Dutch farmers between 1799 and 1800. It was the third of three tax-related rebellions in the 18th century United States, the earlier two being Shays's Rebellion (central and western Massachusetts, 1786–87) and the Whiskey Rebellion (western Pennsylvania, 1794). It was commemorated in 2003 with a Pennsylvania historical marker erected in Quakertown, Pennsylvania, where it first erupted.

== Background ==
When the Quasi-War with France threatened to escalate in 1798, Congress raised a large army and enlarged the navy. To pay for it, Congress in July 1798 imposed $2 million in new taxes on real estate and slaves, apportioned among the states according to the requirements of the Constitution. It was the first (and only) such federal tax.

Congress had also recently passed the Alien and Sedition Acts, criminalizing dissent and increasing the power of the executive branch under John Adams.

== Beginning ==
In July 1798, during the troubles between the United States and France now known as the Quasi-War, the US Congress levied a direct tax (on dwelling-houses, lands and slaves; sometimes called the Direct House Tax of 1798) of $2 million, of which Pennsylvania's share would have been $237,000.

There were very few slaves in Pennsylvania, and the tax was accordingly assessed upon dwelling-houses and land, the value of the houses being determined by the number and size of the windows. For many residents of the area, this came to be known as The Window Tax. The inquisitorial nature of the proceedings, with assessors riding around and counting windows, aroused strong opposition, and many refused to pay, making the constitutional argument that this tax was not being levied in proportion to population. Pennsylvania German farmers were also upset at the fact that the tax assessors were largely Quakers and Moravians, neither of which fought in the American Revolution, while the majority of farmers did.

Pennsylvania auctioneer John Fries organized meetings, starting in February 1799, to discuss a collective response to the tax. As an itinerant auctioneer, Fries was well acquainted with the German-Americans' issues in the southeastern part of Pennsylvania. This was important because the three counties in which the opposition was centered (Bucks, Northampton, and Montgomery) were heavily populated by German immigrants. In Milford township, particularly, assessors were unsuccessful in completing their tax assessments due to intimidation. At a meeting called by government representatives in an attempt to explain the tax in a way as to defuse tensions, protesters waving liberty flags, some in Continental Army uniforms, shouted them down and turned the meeting into a protest rally.

The assessors at first determined to continue their work in Milford. Fries personally warned the assessors to quit their work, but they ignored the threat. He then led a small band that harassed the assessors enough that they decided to abandon Milford for the time being.

In early March, a local militia company and a growing force of irregulars met, marching to the accompaniment of drum and fife. About a hundred set off for Quakertown in pursuit of the assessors, whom they intended to place under arrest. They captured a number of assessors there, releasing them with a warning not to return and to tell the government what had happened to them.

== Spread ==
Opposition to the tax spread to other parts of Pennsylvania. In Penn, the appointed assessor resigned under public threats; the assessors in Hamilton Township and Northampton Township also begged to resign, but were refused as nobody else could be found to take their places.

Federal warrants were issued, and the U.S. Marshal began arresting people for tax resistance in Northampton. Arrests were made without much incident until the marshal reached Macungie, then known as Millerstown, where a crowd formed to protect a man from arrest. Failing to make that arrest, the marshal made a few others and returned to Bethlehem with his prisoners.

Two separate groups of rebels independently vowed to liberate the prisoners, and marched on Bethlehem. They prevailed without violence, and freed the tax resisters who had been arrested. In response to this action, President John Adams called out a force of federal troops and local militia. They marched into the rebellious counties and began making wholesale arrests of the insurgents. John Fries was among the men captured.

== Trials ==
Thirty men went on trial in Federal court. Fries, Frederick Heaney (Hoenig/Haney), and John German were tried for treason and, with Federalists stirring up a frenzy, were sentenced to be hanged. President John Adams pardoned Fries and others convicted of treason. Adams was prompted by the narrower constitutional definition of treason, and he later added that the rebels were "obscure, miserable Germans, as ignorant of our language as they were of our laws" and were being used by "great men" in the opposition party. He issued a general amnesty for everyone involved on May 21, 1800.

Historians are in agreement that the Federalists overreacted and mishandled a small episode. The long-term impact was that the German-American communities rejected the Federalist Party.

== See also ==
- List of incidents of civil unrest in the United States
- Tax resistance in the United States
- Whiskey Rebellion, in Pennsylvania 1794
- List of people pardoned or granted clemency by the president of the United States
