= Bauern Freund Print Shop =

- U.S. National Register of Historic Places
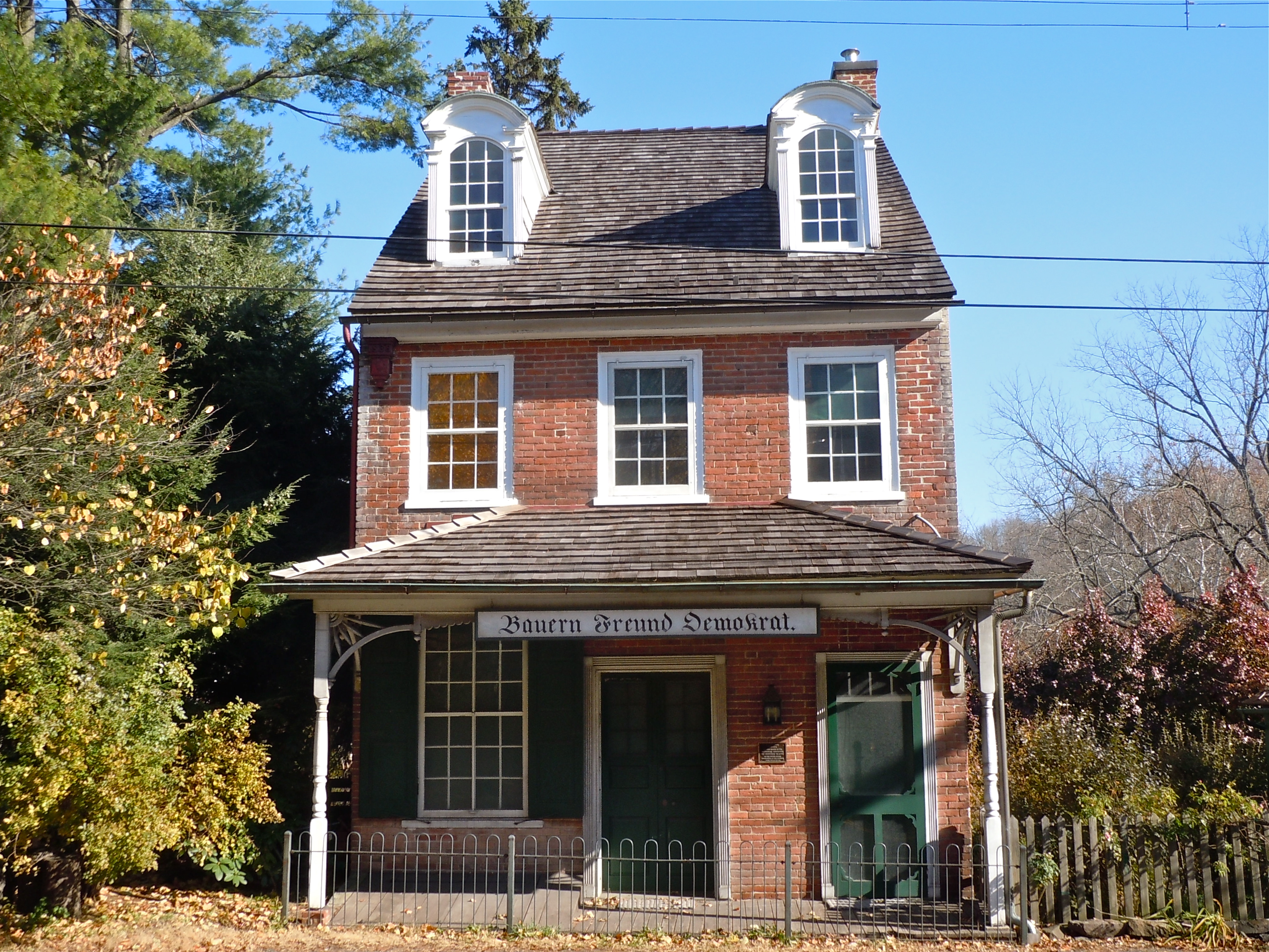
- Bauern Freund Print Shop, November 2011

- Location within Pennsylvania Location within the United States
- Location: PA 63, Marlborough Township, Pennsylvania
- Coordinates: 40°19′44″N 75°27′9″W
- Area: 0.3 acres (0.12 ha)
- Built: 1838
- Architectural style: Mixed (more Than 2 Styles From Different Periods)
- NRHP reference No.: 82003801
- Added to NRHP: July 26, 1982

Bauern Freund Print Shop is a historic print shop located at Marlborough Township, Montgomery County, Pennsylvania. It was built in 1838, and is a 2 1/2-story, brick building with a gable roof. It has a front porch with a hipped roof. The building was built by Enos Benner, a German-American publisher of Der Bauern Freund (The Farmer's Friend) and other influential German language publications.

It was added to the National Register of Historic Places in 1982.
