= Shelly, Pennsylvania =

Unincorporated community in Pennsylvania, U.S.

Coordinates: 40°28′51″N 75°22′20″W

Shelly is an unincorporated community in northwestern Richland Township, Bucks County, Pennsylvania, United States. The community is located on the Tohickon Creek and Pennsylvania Route 309. It uses the Quakertown ZIP Code of 18951.
The elevation is 169 meters (554 ft.).
