= Licking Run (Beaver Run tributary) =

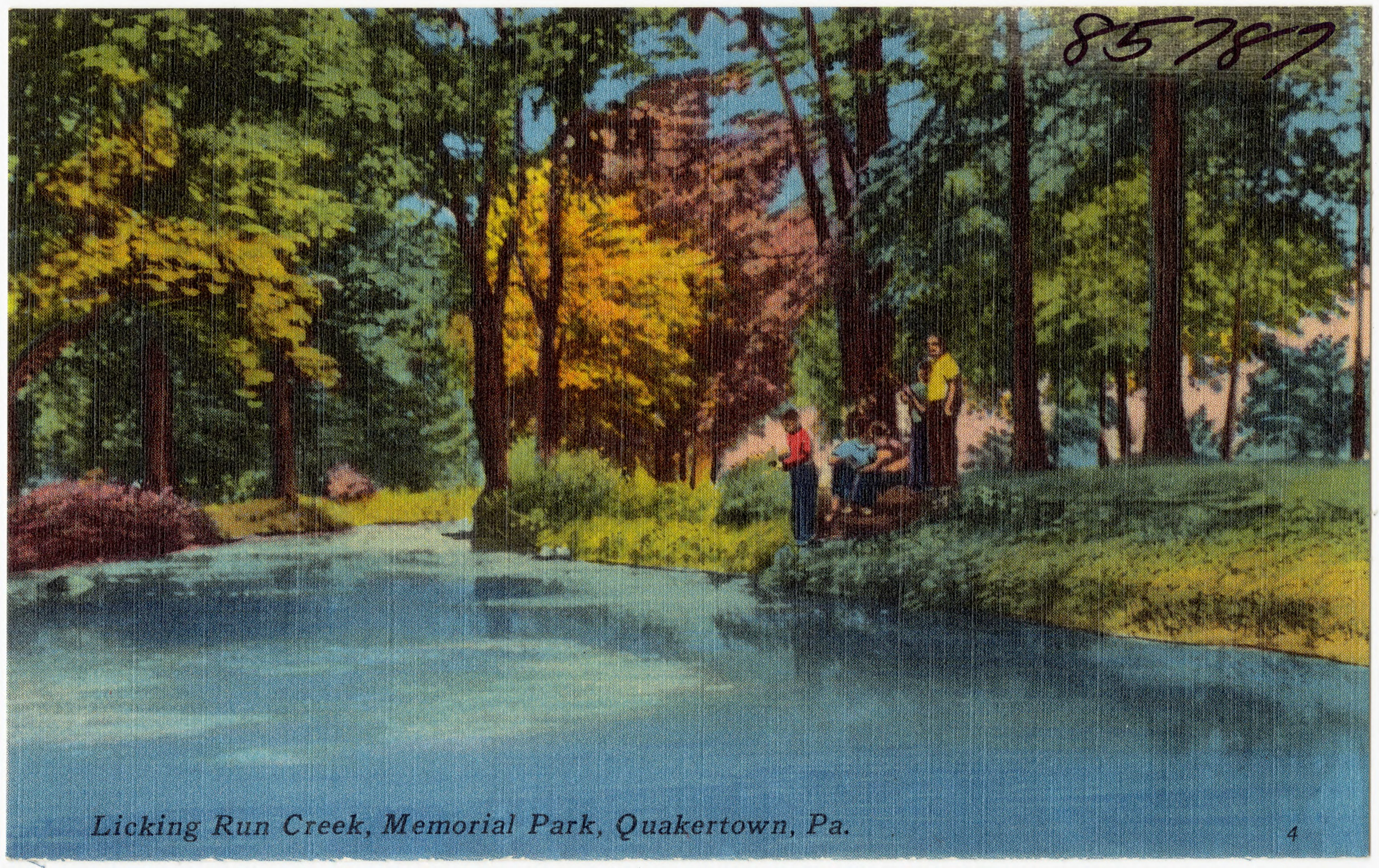
- Licking Run Creek, Memorial Park, Quakertown, Pa. postcard

- Licking Run

Location
- Country: United States
- State: Pennsylvania
- County: Bucks
- Township, Borough: Richland, Quakertown

Physical characteristics
- Source
  - coordinates: 40°27′26″N 75°21′34″W
  - elevation: 600 feet (180 m)
- Mouth
  - coordinates: 40°26′25″N 75°19′24″W
  - elevation: 490 feet (150 m)
- Length: 3.36 miles (5.41 km)

Basin features
- Progression: Licking Run → Beaver Run → Tohickon Creek → Delaware River → Delaware Bay
- River system: Delaware River
- Bridges: West Pumping Station Road; Kelly Drive; Sunshine Drive; Golden Gate Drive; West Mill Street; North Main Street (California Road); North 9th Street; North 4th Street; Pennsylvania Route 212 (North Hellertown Avenue); North Ambler Street; North Penrose Street (foot bridge); Erie Road

Licking Run is a tributary of Beaver Run in Richland Township and Quakertown in Bucks County, Pennsylvania in the United States.

== Course ==
Licking Run rises with two branches in Richland Township at an elevation of 600 feet (180 m), just east of Pennsylvania Route 309 (North West End Boulevard) which are south oriented for about a mile and join just west of Quakertown where the main branch turns east, picks up another branch from the left and continues through town. It passes along the south side of Memorial Park in Quakertown. At the east end of the Borough, it turns to the south where it meets its confluence with Beaver Run (at Beaver Run's 0.82 river mile) at an elevation of 490 feet (150 m), which results in an average slope of 32.74 feet per mile (5.55 meters per kilometer).

== Geology ==
- Appalachian Highlands Division
  - Piedmont Province
    - Gettysburg-Newark Lowland Section
      - Brunswick Formation

Beaver Run lies in the Brunswick Formation, a sedimentary rock laid down during the Jurassic and the Triassic, consisting of mudstone, siltstone, and green, brown, and reddish-brown shale. Mineralogy includes argillite and hornfels.

== Crossings and Bridges ==
- West Pumping Station Road
- Kelly Drive
- Sunshine Drive
- Golden Gate Drive
- West Mill Street
- North Main Street (California Road)
- North 9th Street
- North Main Street
- Pennsylvania Route 212 (North Hellertown Avenue)
- North Ambler Street
- North Penrose Street (pedestrian bridge)
- Erie Road
