= Sumneytown, Pennsylvania =

Unincorporated community in Pennsylvania, US

- Unincorporated community
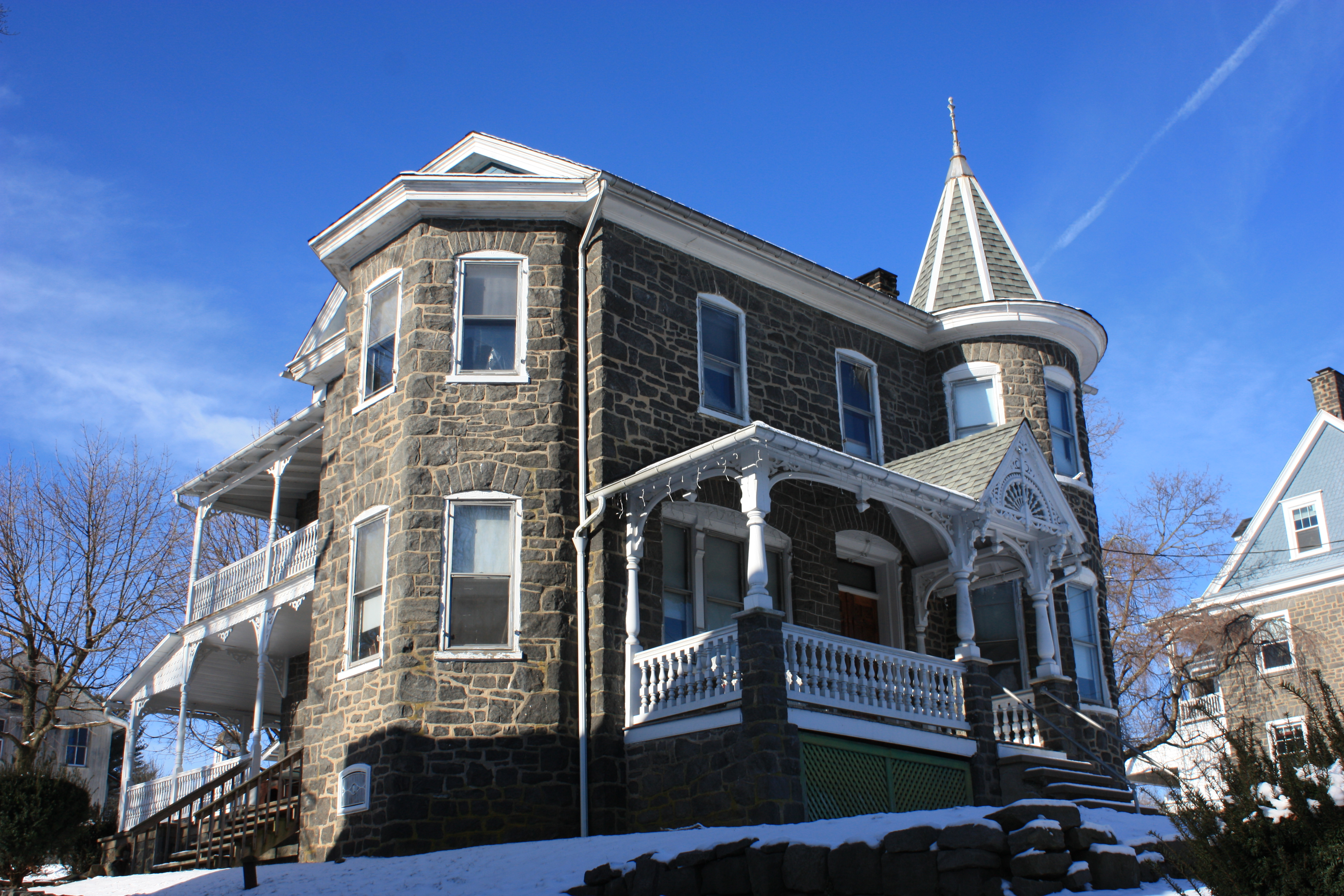

- Location within Pennsylvania
- Coordinates: 40°19′44″N 75°27′04″W
- Country: United States
- State: Pennsylvania
- County: Montgomery
- Township: Marlborough
- Elevation: 203 ft (62 m)
- Time zone: UTC-5 (Eastern (EST))
  - Summer (DST): UTC-4 (EDT)
- ZIP code: 18084
- Area codes: 215, 267 and 445
- GNIS feature ID: 1189058

Sumneytown is an unincorporated community that is situated on Route 63 in Marlborough Township, Montgomery County, Pennsylvania, United States.

== History and geography ==
This village was named for early settler Isaac Sumney, who opened the Red Lion there in 1762.

The Unami Creek forms its natural southeastern boundary with Salford and Upper Salford Townships and flows southwestward into the Perkiomen Creek. The historic Kings Highway passed through Sumneytown and the portion from there north to the Lehigh County line is named Geryville Pike today.

Route 63 starts just to the northwest at Green Lane and proceeds southeastward to the Lansdale/North Wales area as Sumneytown Pike. In 1848, the Sumneytown and Spring House Turnpike was opened to Marlborough and resulted in an influx of tourism from the wealthy families of Philadelphia. This route is designated 63 to Kulpsville today. While Sumneytown has its own box post office, with the zip code of 18084, some residents are served by the Green Lane post office with the zip of 18054.

Sumneytown has a hot-summer humid continental climate (Dfa) and is located in hardiness zone 7a. Its average monthly temperatures range from 30.4 °F in January to 75.1 °F in July.
