= Shelly School =

- U.S. National Register of Historic Places
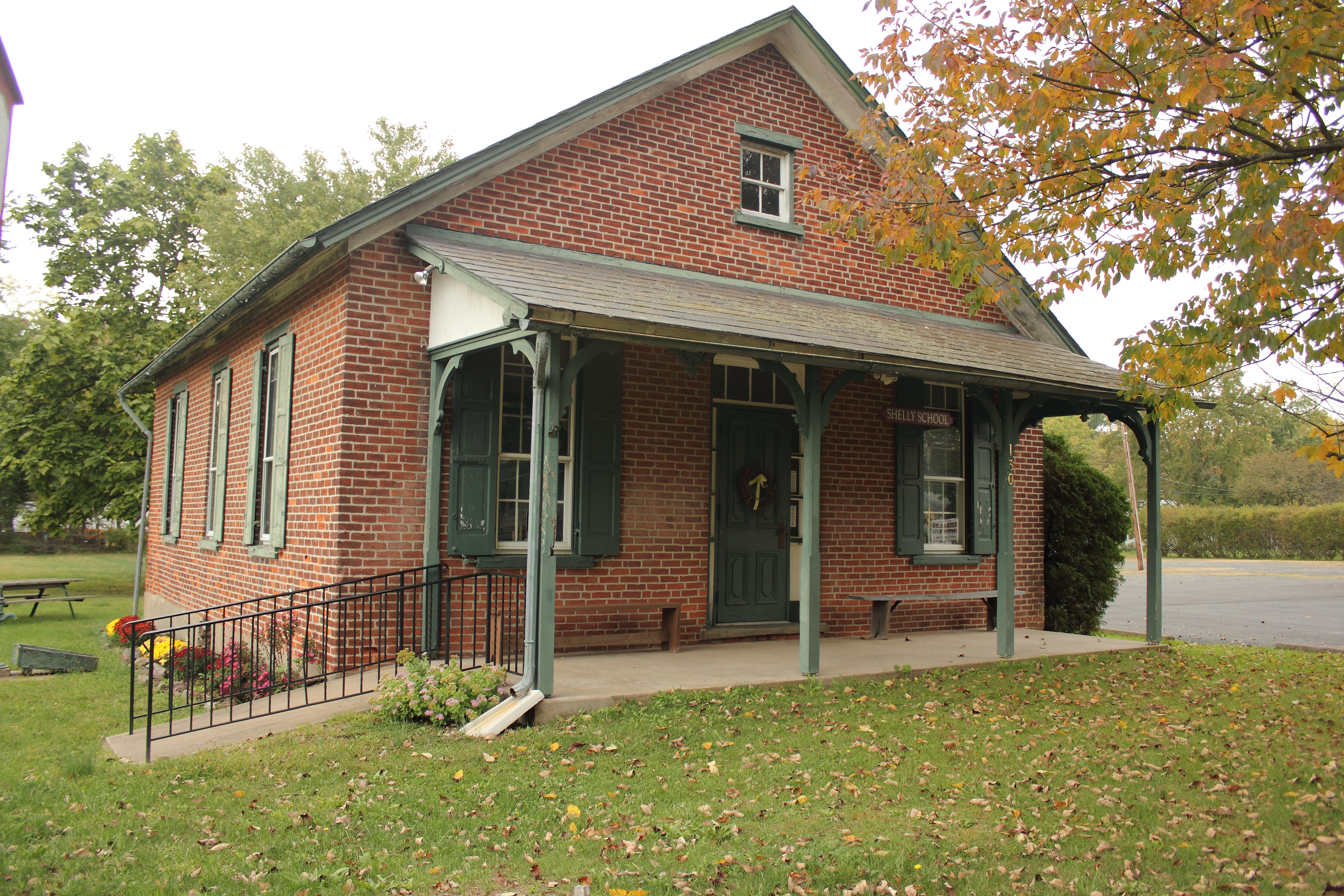
- Shelly School, September 2012

- Location within Pennsylvania Location within the United States
- Location: 130 Richlandtown Pike (Pennsylvania Route 212), Richland Township, Pennsylvania
- Coordinates: 40°27′10″N 75°19′36″W
- Area: less than one acre
- NRHP reference No.: 11000037
- Added to NRHP: February 22, 2011

The Shelly School, also known as "The Little Red Schoolhouse," is an historic, one-room school in Richland Township, Bucks County, Pennsylvania, United States.

It was added to the National Register of Historic Places in 2007.

== History and architectural features ==
Built in 1885, this historic structure is a one-story, one-room, brick schoolhouse building that measures twenty-eight feet wide and thirty-four feet deep and has a slate-covered gable roof. The front entrance is covered by a slate-covered, shed roof. The school closed in 1956, and the building re-opened as a local history museum starting in 1959.
