= Richland Township, Bucks County, Pennsylvania =

Township in Pennsylvania, US

Richland Township
- Township
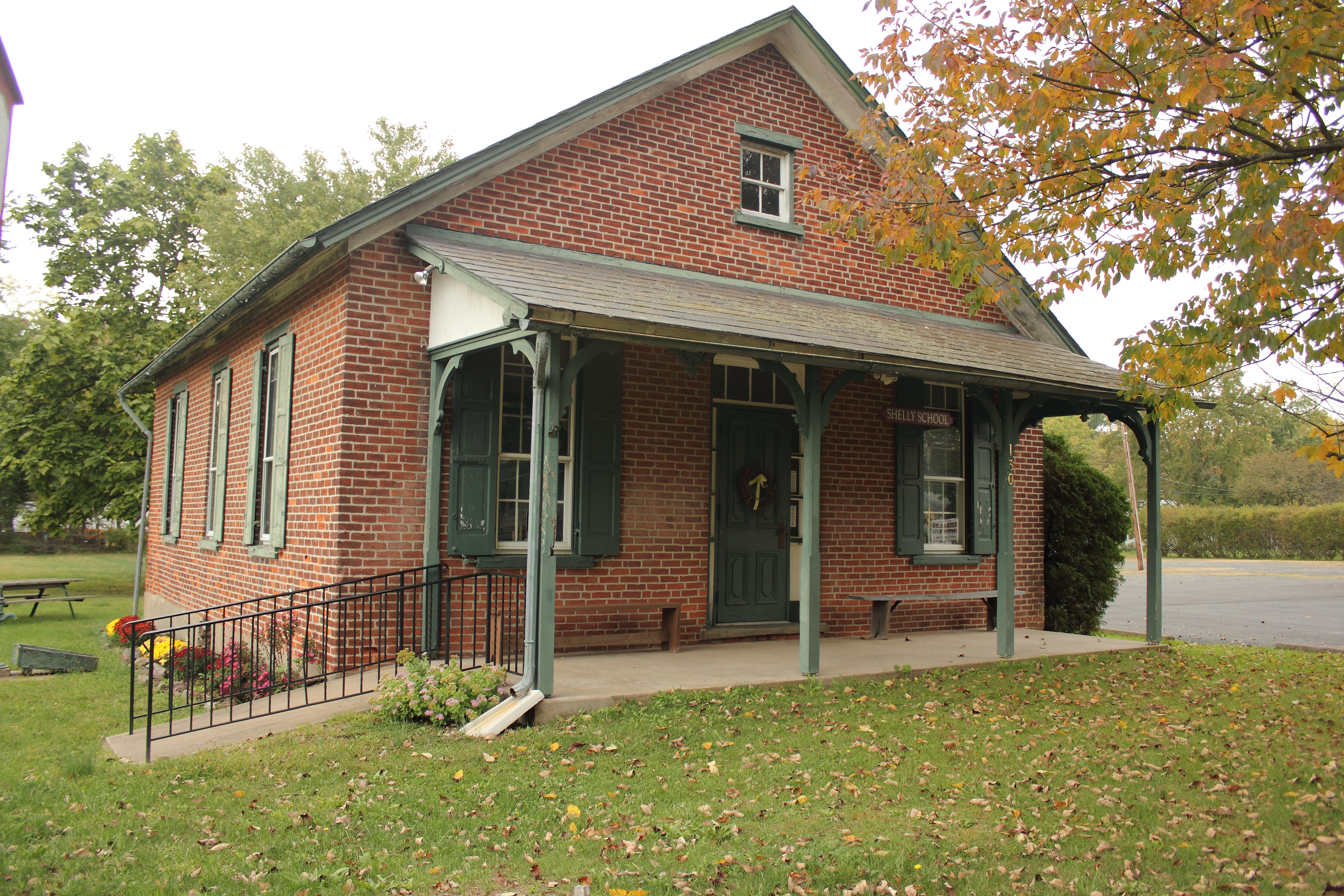
- Little Red Schoolhouse in Richland Township

- Seal

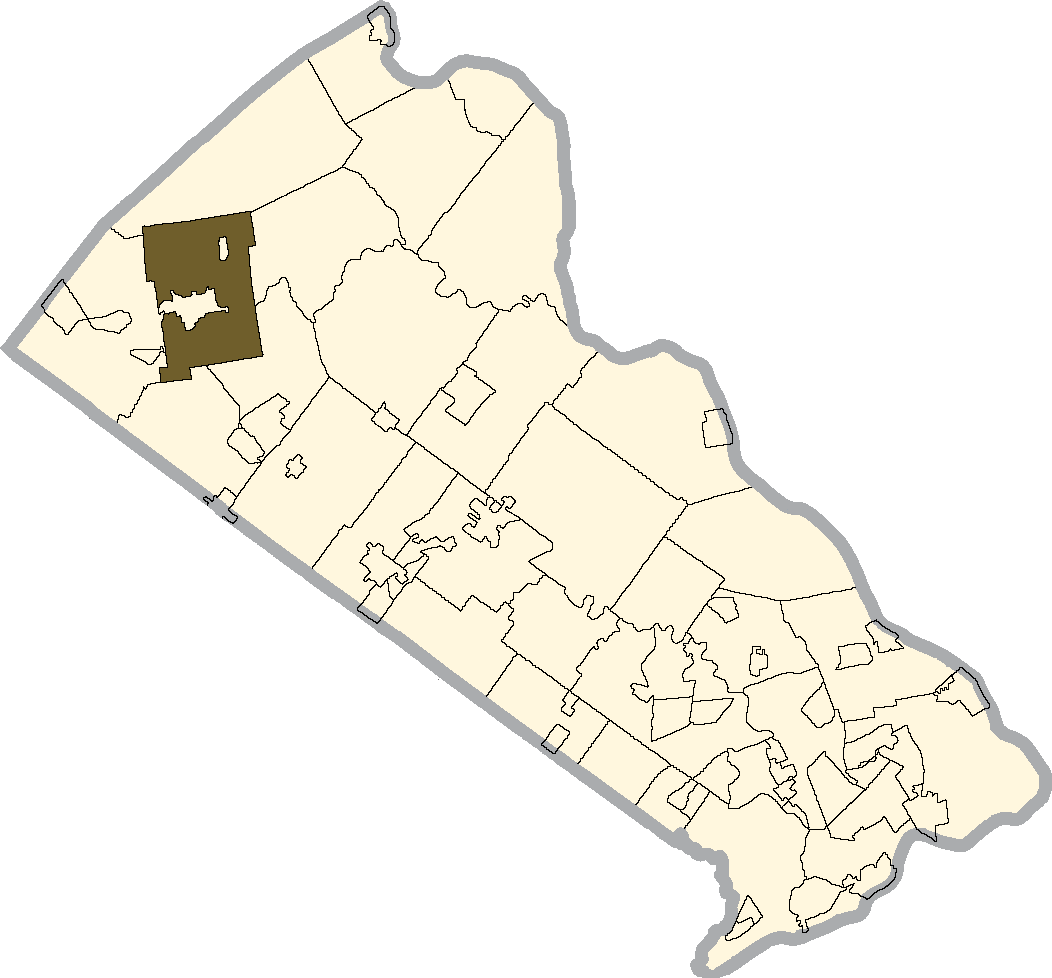
- Location of Richland Township in Bucks County, Pennsylvania

- Location of Richland Township in Pennsylvania Richland Township (the United States)
- Coordinates: 40°26′52″N 75°19′40″W
- Country: United States
- State: Pennsylvania
- County: Bucks
- Established: 1734

Area
  - Total: 20.76 sq mi (53.8 km^{2})
  - Land: 20.65 sq mi (53.5 km^{2})
  - Water: 0.12 sq mi (0.31 km^{2})
- Elevation: 499 ft (152 m)

Population (2010)
  - Total: 13,052
  - Estimate (2016): 13,200
  - Density: 632.1/sq mi (244.0/km^{2})
- Time zone: UTC-5 (EST)
  - Summer (DST): UTC-4 (EDT)
- ZIP Code: 18951
- Area codes: 215, 267 and 445
- FIPS code: 42-017-64536
- Website: www.richlandtownship.org

Richland Township is a township in Bucks County, Pennsylvania, United States. The population was 13,873 at the 2020 U.S. Census

== History ==
The Shelly School was listed on the National Register of Historic Places in 2011.

== Geography ==
According to the U.S. Census Bureau, the township has a total area of 20.5 square miles (53.1 km^{2}), of which 20.5 square miles (53.0 km^{2}) is land and 0.1 square mile (0.1 km^{2}) (0.24%) is water. It is drained by the Tohickon Creek eastward into the Delaware River. The township contains the villages of California, Paletown, Pullen, Quaker, Rich Hill, and Shelly.

Natural features include Beaver Run, Dry Branch Creek, Licking Run, Morgan Creek, Rock Hill, and Tohickon Creek.

=== Adjacent municipalities ===
- Springfield Township (north)
- Haycock Township (east)
- East Rockhill Township (southeast)
- West Rockhill Township (south)
- Milford Township (west)

Richland Township surrounds the boroughs of Quakertown and Richlandtown.

== Demographics ==
Historical population
Census	Pop.	Note	%±
1930	2,173		—
1940	2,105		−3.1%
1950	3,050		44.9%
1960	3,783		24.0%
1970	4,089		8.1%
1980	6,286		53.7%
1990	8,560		36.2%
2000	9,920		15.9%
2010	11,100		11.9%
2020	13,837		24.7%

As of the 2000 census, there were 9,920 people, 3,763 households, and 2,667 families residing in the township. The population density was 484.7 inhabitants per square mile (187.1/km^{2}). There were 3,877 housing units at an average density of 189.4 per square mile (73.1/km^{2}). The racial makeup of the township was 96.35% White, 0.93% African American, 0.11% Native American, 1.16% Asian, 0.38% from other races, and 1.07% from two or more races. Hispanic or Latino of any race were 1.32% of the population.

There were 3,763 households, out of which 34.9% had children under the age of 18 living with them, 59.3% were married couples living together, 7.7% had a female householder with no husband present, and 29.1% were non-families. 23.5% of all households were made up of individuals, and 11.1% had someone living alone who was 65 years of age or older. The average household size was 2.62 and the average family size was 3.13.

In the township, the population was spread out, with 26.2% under the age of 18, 6.5% from 18 to 24, 32.9% from 25 to 44, 20.7% from 45 to 64, and 13.8% who were 65 years of age or older. The median age was 37 years. For every 100 females there were 97.8 males. For every 100 females age 18 and over, there were 94.8 males.

The median income for a household in the township was $47,057, and the median income for a family was $55,359. Males had a median income of $37,677 versus $27,826 for females. The per capita income for the township was $19,582. About 2.5% of families and 5.4% of the population were below the poverty line, including 8.0% of those under age 18 and 6.4% of those age 65 or over.

== Climate ==
According to the Köppen climate classification system, Richland Township, Pennsylvania has a hot-summer, wet all year, humid continental climate (Dfa). Dfa climates are characterized by at least one month having an average mean temperature ≤ 32.0 °F (≤ 0.0 °C), at least four months with an average mean temperature ≥ 50.0 °F (≥ 10.0 °C), at least one month with an average mean temperature ≥ 71.6 °F (≥ 22.0 °C), and no significant precipitation difference between seasons. During the summer months, episodes of extreme heat and humidity can occur with heat index values ≥ 100 °F (≥ 38 °C). On average, the wettest month of the year is July which corresponds with the annual peak in thunderstorm activity. During the winter months, episodes of extreme cold and wind can occur with wind chill values < 0 °F (< -18 °C). The plant hardiness zone is 6b with an average annual extreme minimum air temperature of -2.0 °F (-18.9 °C). The average seasonal (Nov-Apr) snowfall total is between 30 and 36 inches (76 and 91 cm), and the average snowiest month is February which corresponds with the annual peak in nor'easter activity.

Climate data for Richland Township, Bucks County, Pennsylvania (1981 – 2010 averages)
Month	Jan	Feb	Mar	Apr	May	Jun	Jul	Aug	Sep	Oct	Nov	Dec	Year
Mean daily maximum °F (°C)	37.6 (3.1)	40.9 (4.9)	49.5 (9.7)	61.7 (16.5)	71.7 (22.1)	80.2 (26.8)	84.1 (28.9)	82.5 (28.1)	75.8 (24.3)	64.3 (17.9)	53.1 (11.7)	41.6 (5.3)	62.0 (16.7)
Daily mean °F (°C)	28.8 (−1.8)	31.5 (−0.3)	39.2 (4.0)	50.2 (10.1)	60.0 (15.6)	69.0 (20.6)	73.4 (23.0)	71.8 (22.1)	64.4 (18.0)	52.9 (11.6)	43.1 (6.2)	33.2 (0.7)	51.6 (10.9)
Mean daily minimum °F (°C)	20.1 (−6.6)	22.0 (−5.6)	28.9 (−1.7)	38.7 (3.7)	48.2 (9.0)	57.8 (14.3)	62.6 (17.0)	61.0 (16.1)	53.0 (11.7)	41.6 (5.3)	33.1 (0.6)	24.8 (−4.0)	41.1 (5.1)
Average precipitation inches (mm)	3.49 (89)	2.83 (72)	3.70 (94)	4.09 (104)	4.32 (110)	4.36 (111)	4.83 (123)	3.89 (99)	4.58 (116)	4.36 (111)	3.78 (96)	4.08 (104)	48.31 (1,227)
Average relative humidity (%)	68.7	65.9	61.3	59.7	63.8	70.0	69.9	72.8	73.6	71.7	71.2	71.2	68.3
Average dew point °F (°C)	19.8 (−6.8)	21.4 (−5.9)	27.0 (−2.8)	36.7 (2.6)	47.7 (8.7)	58.8 (14.9)	63.0 (17.2)	62.6 (17.0)	55.8 (13.2)	44.0 (6.7)	34.4 (1.3)	24.9 (−3.9)	41.4 (5.2)
Source: PRISM Climate Group

== Ecology ==
According to the A. W. Kuchler U.S. potential natural vegetation types, Richland Township, Pennsylvania would have an Appalachian Oak (104) vegetation type with an Eastern Hardwood Forest (25) vegetation form.

== Transportation ==
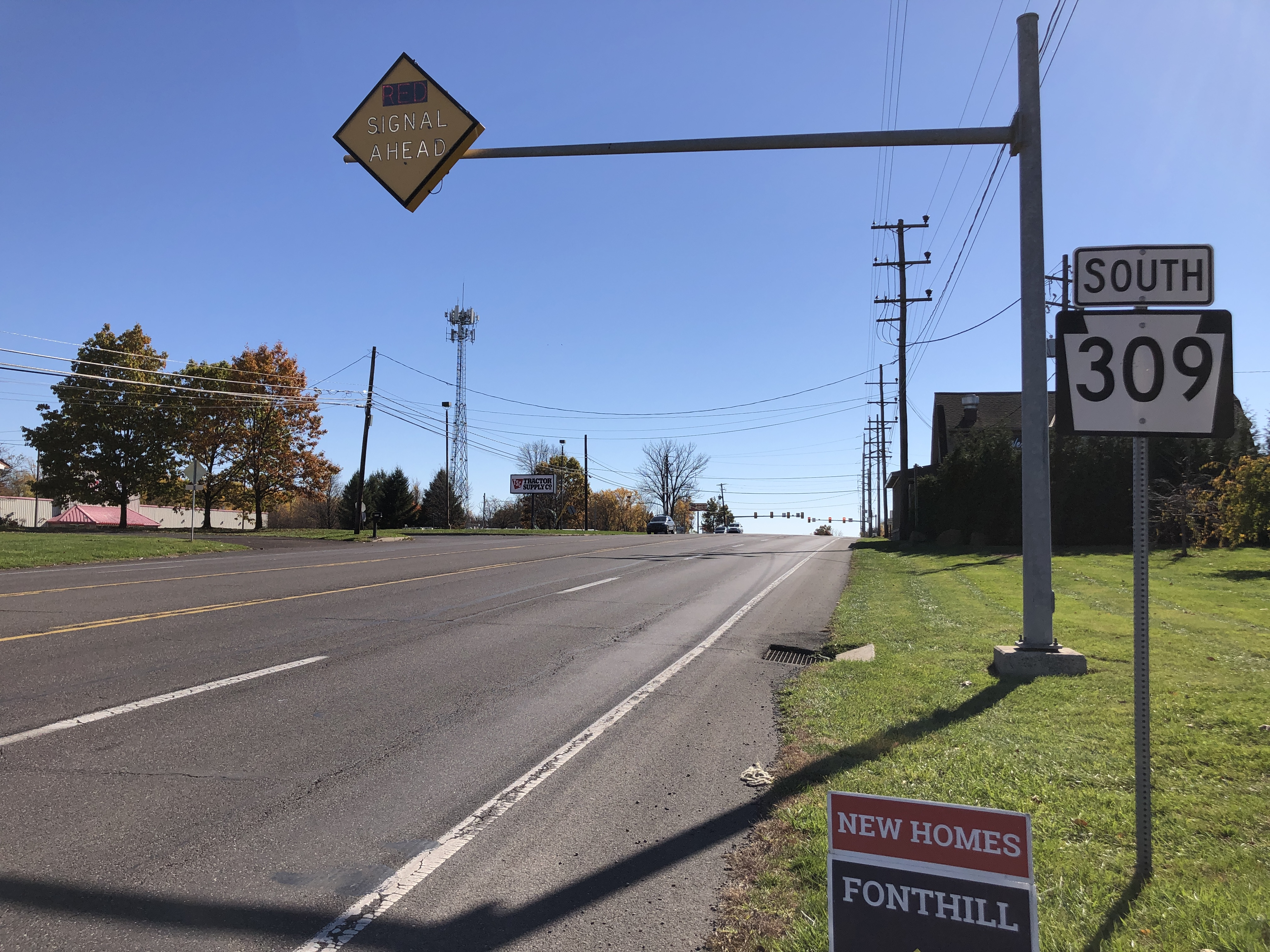
PA 309 southbound in Richland Township

As of 2018 there were 82.76 miles (133.19 km) of public roads in Richland Township, of which 26.73 miles (43.02 km) were maintained by the Pennsylvania Department of Transportation (PennDOT) and 56.03 miles (90.17 km) were maintained by the township.

Pennsylvania Route 309 is the most prominent highway serving Richland Township. It follows West End Boulevard along a southeast-to-northwest alignment in southern and western portions of the township. Pennsylvania Route 212 follows a southwest-to-northeast alignment across northeastern portions of the township, utilizing Richlandtown Road and Church Road. Pennsylvania Route 313 follows an east-west alignment via Doylestown Pike across the eastern portion of the township. Finally, Pennsylvania Route 663 follows a section of West Broad Street near the western edge of the township.

== Government and politics ==
=== Legislators ===
- State Representative Craig Staats, Republican, Pennsylvania House of Representatives, District 145
- State Senator Jarrett Coleman, Republican, Pennsylvania Senate, District 16
- US Representative Brian Fitzpatrick, Republican, Pennsylvania's 1st congressional district

=== Board of Supervisors ===
- Kathie Doyle
- Christopher Vanelli
- Mason Smith
