= Hoppenville, Pennsylvania =

Hoppenville
- Unincorporated community
- Location within the state of Pennsylvania Hoppenville (the United States)
- Coordinates: 40°22′42″N 75°27′37″W
- Country: United States
- State: Pennsylvania
- County: Montgomery
- Township: Marlborough
- Elevation: 371 ft (113 m)
- Time zone: UTC-5 (Eastern (EST))
  - Summer (DST): UTC-4 (EDT)
- GNIS feature ID: 1203838

Hoppenville is an unincorporated community located within Marlborough Township, Montgomery County, Pennsylvania. The municipal offices of the township are located in Hoppenville.
