= Quakertown Airport =

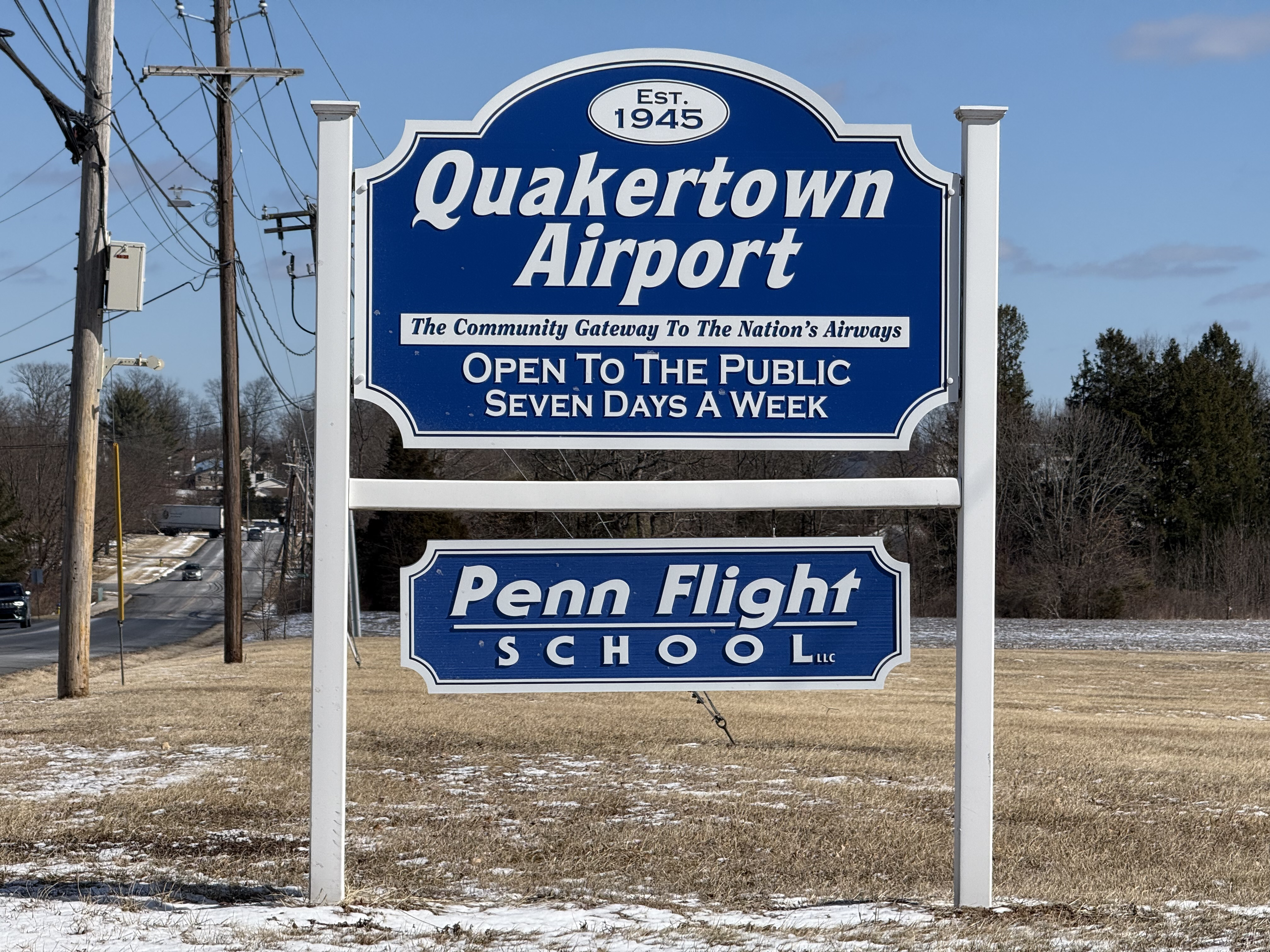
- IATA: UKT; ICAO: KUKT; FAA LID: UKT

Summary
- Airport type: Public
- Owner/Operator: Bucks County Airport Authority
- Serves: Quakertown, Pennsylvania
- Location: Milford Township, Bucks County, Pennsylvania
- Elevation AMSL: 526 ft / 160 m
- Coordinates: 40°26′11″N 75°22′49″W

Map
- Location within Pennsylvania UKT (the United States)

Runways
Direction	Length		Surface
Direction	ft	m	Surface
11/29	3,201	976	Asphalt

Statistics (2008)
- Aircraft operations: 29,642
- Based aircraft: 88
- Source: Federal Aviation Administration

Quakertown Airport (IATA: UKT, ICAO: KUKT, FAA LID: UKT) is a public airport in Milford Township, Bucks County, Pennsylvania, owned by the Bucks County Airport Authority. It is two miles west of Quakertown, Pennsylvania and was dedicated on 22 January 1965. It is home to the Civil Air Patrol Squadron 904.

== Facilities ==
Quakertown Airport covers 122 acres (49 ha) at an elevation of 526 feet (160 m). Its one runway, 11/29, is 3,201 by 50 feet (976 x 15 m) asphalt.

In the year ending 4 September 2008 the airport had 29,642 aircraft operations, average 81 per day: 99% general aviation and 1% air taxi. 88 aircraft were then based at the airport: 89% single-engine, 6% multi-engine, 2% jet, 1% helicopter and 2% ultralight.

A flight school, Penn Flight Academy, is based at the airport.

== See also ==
- List of airports in Pennsylvania
