= Craig Staats =

American politician (born 1961)

Member of the Pennsylvania House of Representatives from the 145th district
- Incumbent
- Assumed office January 6, 2015
- Preceded by: Paul Clymer

Personal details
- Born: February 4, 1961 (age 65) Doylestown, Pennsylvania, U.S.
- Party: Republican
- Spouse: Robin
- Children: Dylan, Nicholas
- Education: Johnson & Wales University
- Occupation: State legislator

Craig T. Staats (born February 4, 1961) is a member of the Pennsylvania House of Representatives, representing the 145th House district in Bucks County, Pennsylvania. Staats is a former Richland Township Supervisor, having served from 2006 to 2014. He succeeded Representative Paul Clymer who retired; in 2014 Craig Staats defeated Karen Chellew in the general election. In 2016, Craig Staats was re-elected, defeating challenger Vera Cole.

In 2016, Staats endorsed Donald Trump for President. Staats is the Marketing Chair of the Liquor Control Committee, working to modernize hotel license laws. Staats has been a vocal critic of Governor Tom Wolf, and a supporter of reopening businesses amid the COVID-19 pandemic in Pennsylvania.

Staats currently sits on the Education, Finance, Liquor Control, and State Government committees.
