= Paul Clymer =

American politician

Paul Irvin Clymer

Member of the Pennsylvania House of Representatives from the 145th district
- In office January 6, 1981 – January 6, 2015
- Preceded by: Marvin D. Weidner
- Succeeded by: Craig Staats

Personal details
- Born: July 8, 1937 (age 89) Sellersville, Pennsylvania
- Party: Republican
- Spouse: Single

Paul Irvin Clymer (born July 8, 1937) was a Republican member of the Pennsylvania House of Representatives, where he represented the 145th Legislative District in Bucks County. First elected in 1980, he served in the seat until January 6, 2015.

After high school, Clymer attended Muhlenberg College, where he served in the ROTC and earned a degree in Economics in 1959. Following graduation from college, he spent four years in the U.S. Army on active duty. Clymer worked as a credit manager at Lankenau Hospital between leaving active military service and his election to the House.

Clymer served as chairman of the House Education Committee. He was also a member of the House Gaming Oversight Committee and has been an outspoken critic of the legalization of gambling in the state, urging for more regulation in the industry.

In the 1990s, Clymer hosted a television program called The Legislative Report with Paul Clymer.

In January 2010, Clymer announced that he would not seek re-election in the November 2010 election. However, the next week, he reconsidered and said he would run for re-election.

Clymer announced in January 2014 that he would not be running for re-election in the Fall of 2014.
