= Unami Creek =

Tributary of Perkiomen Creek in southeastern Pennsylvania

Coordinates: 40.34569°N 75.43770°W

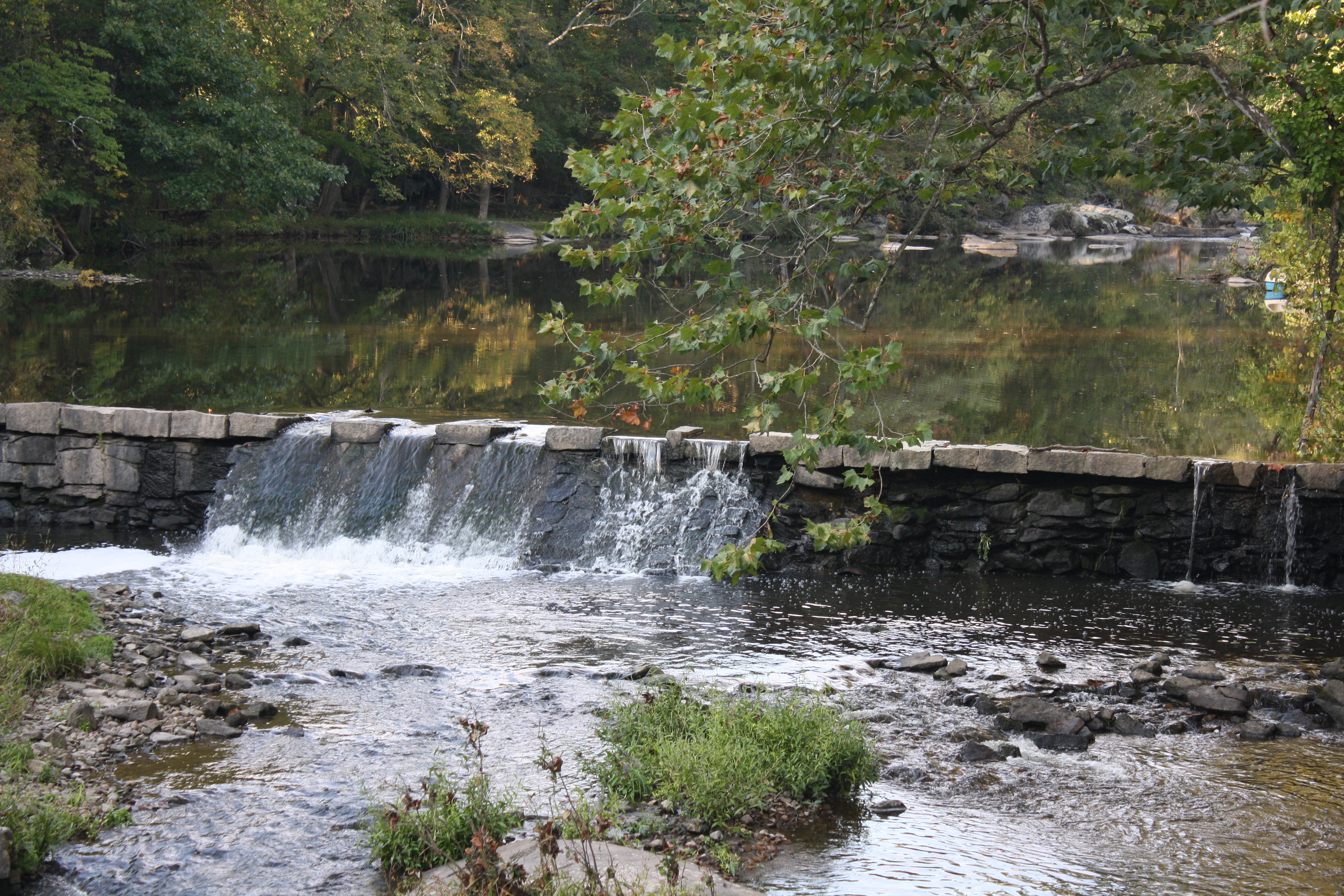
Unami Creek upstream from Sutch Road Bridge in Marlborough Township in Montgomery County, Pennsylvania

Unami Creek is a 16.5-mile-long (26.6 km) tributary of Perkiomen Creek in Lehigh, Bucks, and Montgomery counties in eastern and southeastern Pennsylvania.

Unami Creek is named for the Lenape's Unami language (/wə̆naːmiːw/). The creek originates in Lower Milford Township in Lehigh County, Pennsylvania and then crosses into Milford Township and Marlborough Township, and joins Perkiomen Creek near Perkiomenville. It was formerly called Swamp Creek. The name now applies to the current day West Swamp Creek.

== Bridges ==
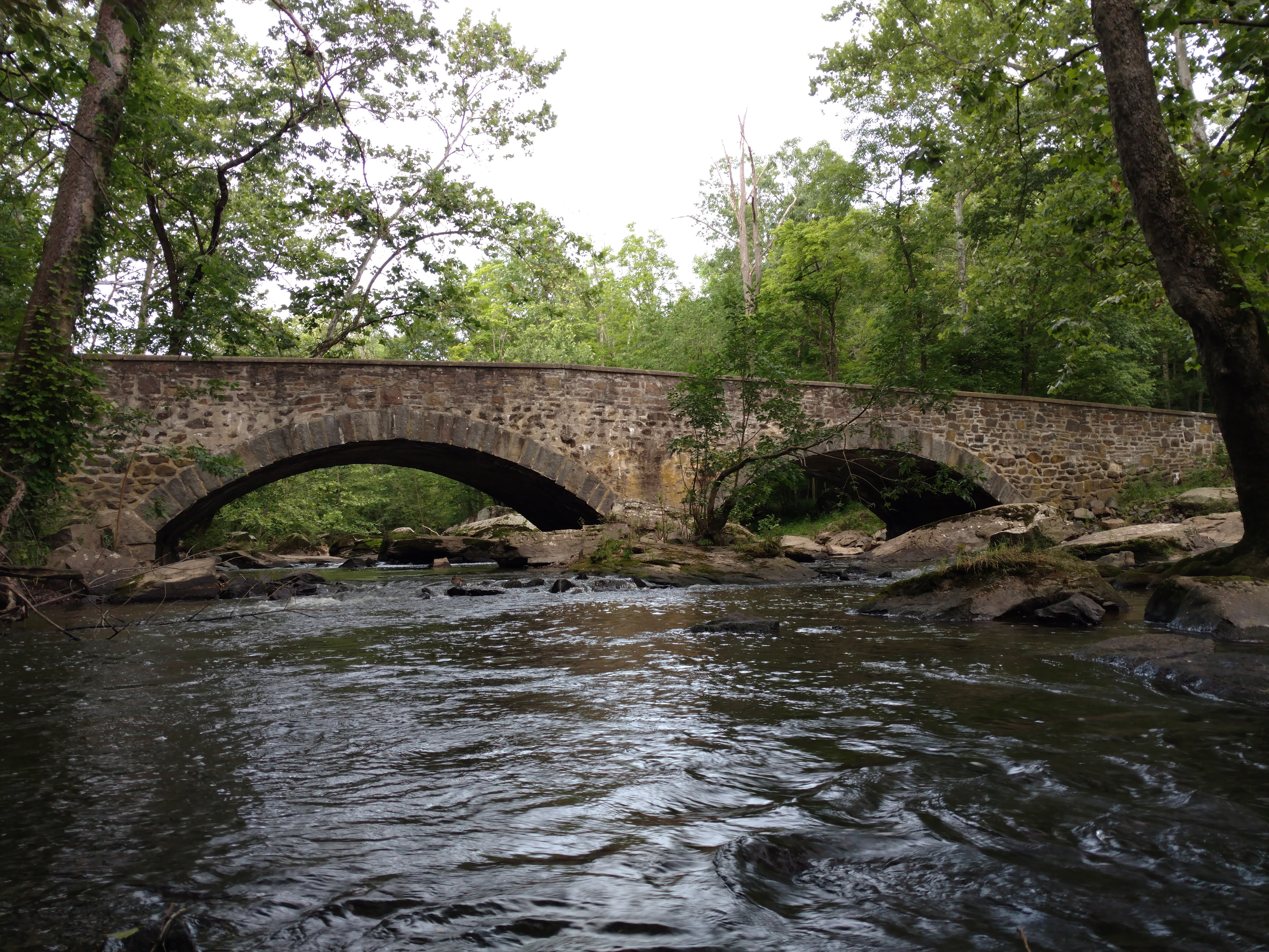
- Price Road Stone Arch Bridge
  Price Road Bridge
- Sutch Road Bridge in Marlborough Township
- Swamp Creek Road Bridge

== See also ==
- List of rivers of Pennsylvania
