= Milford Township, Bucks County, Pennsylvania =

Township in Pennsylvania, US

Milford Township
- Township
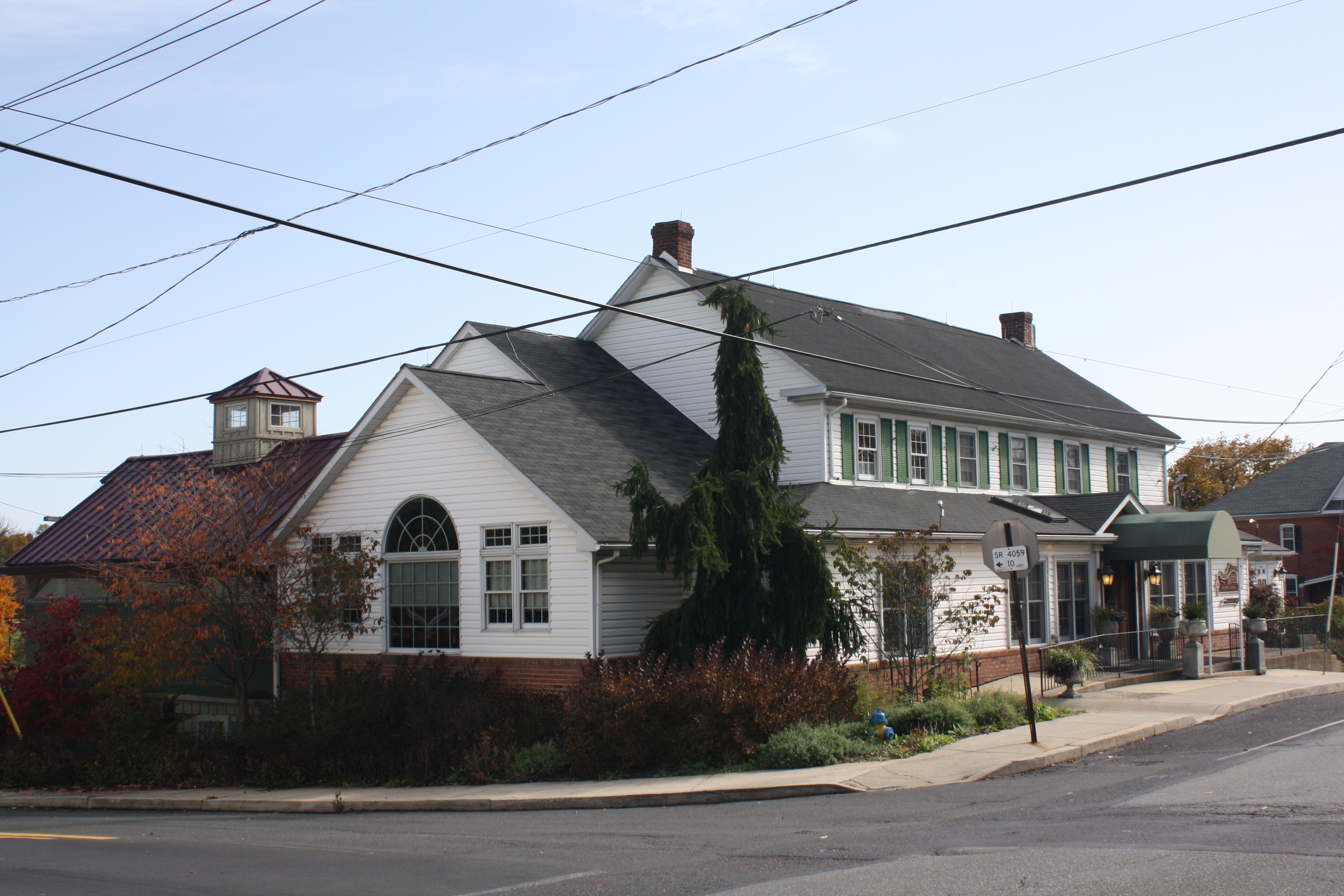
- Spinnerstown Hotel in Milford Township, Pennsylvania

- Logo

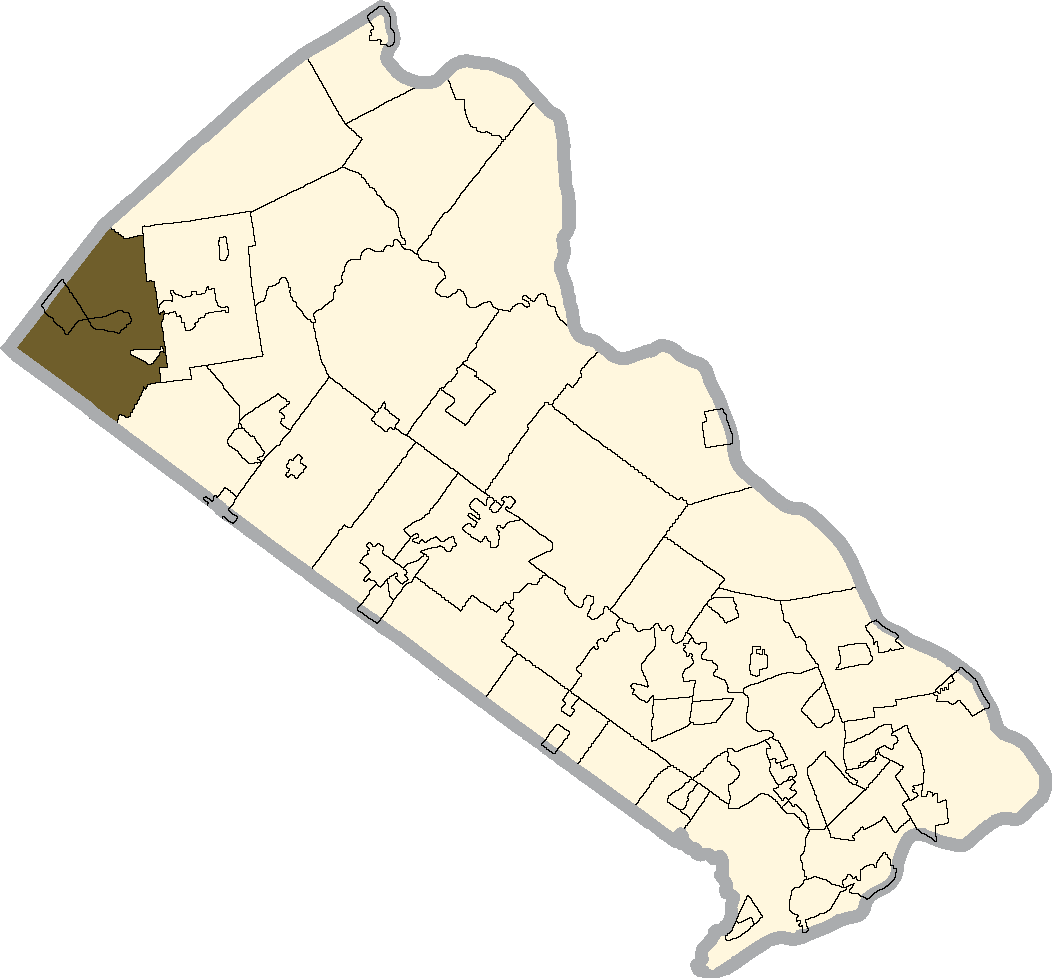
- Location of Milford Township in Bucks County

- Location of Milford Township in Pennsylvania and the United States Milford Township (the United States)
- Coordinates: 40°25′13″N 75°24′20″W
- Country: United States
- State: Pennsylvania
- County: Bucks

Area
  - Total: 27.97 sq mi (72.4 km^{2})
  - Land: 27.89 sq mi (72.2 km^{2})
  - Water: 0.08 sq mi (0.21 km^{2})
- Elevation: 433 ft (132 m)

Population (2010)
  - Total: 9,902
  - Estimate (2016): 10,073
  - Density: 355.0/sq mi (137.1/km^{2})
- Time zone: UTC-5 (EST)
  - Summer (DST): UTC-4 (EDT)
- ZIP Codes: 18036, 18041, 18054, 18073, 18935, mainly 18951, 18968
- Area codes: 215, 267 & 445
- FIPS code: 42-017-49384
- Website: www.milfordtownship.org

Milford Township is a township in Bucks County, Pennsylvania, United States. The population was 9,902 at the 2010 census.

== Geography ==
According to the U.S. Census Bureau, the township has a total area of 28.1 square miles (72.8 km^{2}), of which 28.1 square miles (72.7 km^{2}) is land and 0.04 square mile (0.1 km^{2}) (0.11%) is water. Milford Township is in the Delaware River watershed and most of it is drained by the Unami Creek and Macoby Creek into the Perkiomen Creek and Schuylkill River, but an area in the eastern portion is drained eastward by the Tohickon Creek. Other natural features include Butter Creek, Hazelback Creek, Kuglers Roost, Licking Creek, Morgan Run, and Schmoutz Creek.

The township's villages include Brick Tavern, Cressman, Finland, Geryville (also in Montgomery County and pronounced with a hard "g"), Kumry, Milford Square, Mumbauersville, Rosedale, Sleepy Hollow, Spinnerstown, and Steinsburg.

=== Adjacent municipalities ===
- Springfield Township (northeast)
- Richland Township (east)
- West Rockhill Township (southeast)
- Marlborough Township, Montgomery County (southwest)
- Upper Hanover Township, Montgomery County (southwest)
- Lower Milford Township, Lehigh County (northwest)
- Upper Saucon Township, Lehigh County (tangent to the north)

Trumbauersville is surrounded by Milford Township.

== Demographics ==
Historical population
Census	Pop.	Note	%±
1930	2,248		—
1940	2,521		12.1%
1950	2,865		13.6%
1960	3,524		23.0%
1970	4,812		36.5%
1980	6,053		25.8%
1990	7,360		21.6%
2000	8,810		19.7%
2010	9,902		12.4%
2020	10,243		3.4%

As of the 2010 census, the township was 94.1% White, 1.5% Black or African American, 0.1% Native American, 1.4% Asian, and 1.3% were two or more races. 1.8% of the population were of Hispanic or Latino ancestry.

As of the 2000 census, there were 8,810 people, 3,073 households, and 2,449 families residing in the township. The population density was 314.0 inhabitants per square mile (121.2/km^{2}). There were 3,161 housing units at an average density of 112.7 per square mile (43.5/km^{2}). The racial makeup of the township was 97.75% White, 0.69% African American, 0.09% Native American, 0.65% Asian, 0.01% Pacific Islander, 0.32% from other races, and 0.49% from two or more races. Hispanic or Latino of any race were 1.02% of the population.

There were 3,073 households, out of which 36.9% had children under the age of 18 living with them, 71.0% were married couples living together, 5.3% had a female householder with no husband present, and 20.3% were non-families. 15.9% of all households were made up of individuals, and 5.1% had someone living alone who was 65 years of age or older. The average household size was 2.80 and the average family size was 3.16.

In the township, the population was spread out, with 26.2% under the age of 18, 6.1% from 18 to 24, 31.4% from 25 to 44, 24.9% from 45 to 64, and 11.3% who were 65 years of age or older. The median age was 38 years. For every 100 females there were 99.1 males. For every 100 females age 18 and over, there were 96.2 males.

The median income for a household in the township was $59,683, and the median income for a family was $64,563. Males had a median income of $41,132 versus $30,773 for females. The per capita income for the township was $23,559. About 2.1% of families and 2.9% of the population were below the poverty line, including 3.6% of those under age 18 and 0.8% of those age 65 or over.

== Transportation ==
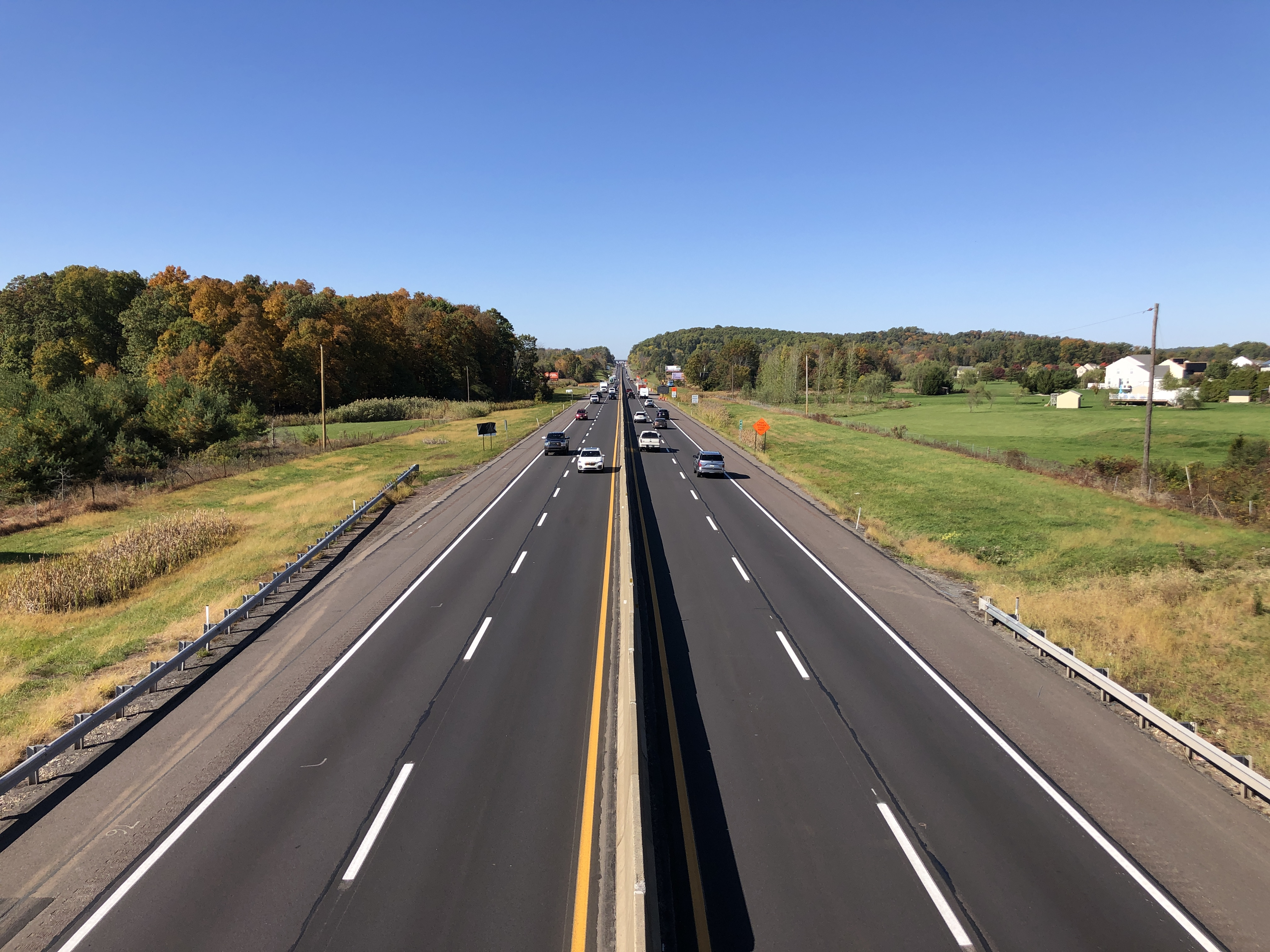
I-476/Pennsylvania Turnpike Northeast Extension northbound in Milford Township

As of 2018 there were 110.11 miles (177.20 km) of public roads in Milford Township, of which 6.30 miles (10.14 km) were maintained by the Pennsylvania Turnpike Commission (PTC), 27.33 miles (43.98 km) were maintained by the Pennsylvania Department of Transportation (PennDOT) and 76.48 miles (123.08 km) were maintained by the township.

The Pennsylvania Turnpike Northeast Extension (I-476) is the main highway serving Milford Township. It follows a southeast-to-northwest alignment through the center of the township, interchanging with Pennsylvania Route 663. PA 663, the only other numbered highway serving Milford, follows the Johh Fries Highway along a southwest-to-northeast alignment through central portions of the township. A local north-to-south thoroughfare is Allentown Road, which extends south from Coopersburg into Montgomery County. Other local roads of note include Geryville Pike, Krammes Road/Spinnerstown Road, Kumry Road, Old Bethlehem Pike, Sleepy Hollow Road/Steinburg Road, and Trumbauersville Road.

Milford Township has intercity bus service available at a park and ride lot along PA 663 at the interchange with I-476. Fullington Trailways provides service from the park and ride lot to the Philadelphia, Hazleton, Williamsport, and several other places in northern Pennsylvania. Martz Trailways provides service from the park and ride lot to Scranton, Wilkes-Barre, White Haven, Allentown, and Philadelphia. This is an Amtrak Thruway route, connecting to Amtrak trains at 30th Street Station in Philadelphia.

Quakertown Airport is located within the township.

== Government and politics ==
=== Legislators ===
- State Representative Craig T. Staats, Republican, 145th district
- State Senator Jarrett Coleman, Republican, 16th district
- US Representative Brian Fitzpatrick, Republican, Pennsylvania's 1st congressional district

=== Board of Supervisors ===
- Christian Haberle, Chairman
- John Mininger, Vice Chair
- Tim Johnson

=== Police ===
Milford Township is patrolled by the Pennsylvania State Police, Dublin Barracks.

== Climate ==
According to the Köppen climate classification system, Milford Twp has a Hot-summer, Humid continental climate (Dfa). Dfa climates are characterized by at least one month having an average mean temperature ≤ 32.0 °F (0.0 °C), at least four months with an average mean temperature ≥ 50.0 °F (10.0 °C), at least one month with an average mean temperature ≥ 71.6 °F (22.0 °C) and no significant precipitation difference between seasons. Although most summer days are slightly humid in Milford Twp, episodes of heat and high humidity can occur with heat index values > 104 °F (40 °C). Since 1981, the highest air temperature was 102.4 °F (39.1 °C) on 07/22/2011, and the highest daily average mean dew point was 74.5 °F (23.6 °C) on 08/01/2006. The average wettest month is July which corresponds with the annual peak in thunderstorm activity. Since 1981, the wettest calendar day was 7.74 inches (197 mm) on 09/30/2010. During the winter months, the average annual extreme minimum air temperature is −1.5 °F (−18.6 °C). Since 1981, the coldest air temperature was −13.6 °F (−25.3 °C) on 01/22/1984. Episodes of extreme cold and wind can occur with wind chill values < −12 °F (−24 °C). The average annual snowfall (Nov-Apr) is between 30 inches (76 cm) and 36 inches (91 cm). Ice storms and large snowstorms depositing ≥ 12 inches (30 cm) of snow occur once every few years, particularly during nor’easters from December through February.

Climate data for Milford Twp, Elevation 502 ft (153 m), 1981-2010 normals, extremes 1981-2018
Month	Jan	Feb	Mar	Apr	May	Jun	Jul	Aug	Sep	Oct	Nov	Dec	Year
Record high °F (°C)	69.9 (21.1)	77.6 (25.3)	86.2 (30.1)	92.2 (33.4)	94.0 (34.4)	95.4 (35.2)	102.4 (39.1)	98.7 (37.1)	96.3 (35.7)	89.0 (31.7)	79.5 (26.4)	74.2 (23.4)	102.4 (39.1)
Mean daily maximum °F (°C)	37.6 (3.1)	41.0 (5.0)	49.6 (9.8)	61.7 (16.5)	71.8 (22.1)	80.4 (26.9)	84.4 (29.1)	82.7 (28.2)	75.9 (24.4)	64.3 (17.9)	53.2 (11.8)	41.7 (5.4)	62.1 (16.7)
Daily mean °F (°C)	29.0 (−1.7)	31.6 (−0.2)	39.4 (4.1)	50.3 (10.2)	60.1 (15.6)	69.1 (20.6)	73.6 (23.1)	71.9 (22.2)	64.5 (18.1)	53.0 (11.7)	43.2 (6.2)	33.3 (0.7)	51.7 (10.9)
Mean daily minimum °F (°C)	20.3 (−6.5)	22.2 (−5.4)	29.2 (−1.6)	38.9 (3.8)	48.4 (9.1)	57.9 (14.4)	62.8 (17.1)	61.1 (16.2)	53.1 (11.7)	41.7 (5.4)	33.3 (0.7)	24.9 (−3.9)	41.2 (5.1)
Record low °F (°C)	−13.6 (−25.3)	−6.2 (−21.2)	0.9 (−17.3)	16.6 (−8.6)	31.0 (−0.6)	39.8 (4.3)	46.5 (8.1)	41.4 (5.2)	33.6 (0.9)	23.1 (−4.9)	10.1 (−12.2)	−2.5 (−19.2)	−13.6 (−25.3)
Average precipitation inches (mm)	3.40 (86)	2.77 (70)	3.64 (92)	3.97 (101)	4.30 (109)	4.27 (108)	4.89 (124)	3.86 (98)	4.67 (119)	4.34 (110)	3.75 (95)	3.94 (100)	47.80 (1,214)
Average relative humidity (%)	68.7	66.2	61.3	59.9	64.0	70.2	70.0	73.1	73.4	71.4	71.2	71.3	68.4
Average dew point °F (°C)	20.0 (−6.7)	21.6 (−5.8)	27.2 (−2.7)	36.9 (2.7)	47.9 (8.8)	59.0 (15.0)	63.2 (17.3)	62.8 (17.1)	55.8 (13.2)	44.0 (6.7)	34.5 (1.4)	25.0 (−3.9)	41.6 (5.3)
Source: PRISM

== Ecology ==
According to the A. W. Kuchler U.S. potential natural vegetation types, Milford Twp would have a dominant vegetation type of Appalachian Oak (104) with a dominant vegetation form of Eastern Hardwood Forest (25). The plant hardiness zone is 6b with an average annual extreme minimum air temperature of −1.5 °F (−18.6 °C). The spring bloom typically begins by April 15 and fall color usually peaks by October 26.
