= Trumbauersville, Pennsylvania =

Borough in Pennsylvania, US

- Borough
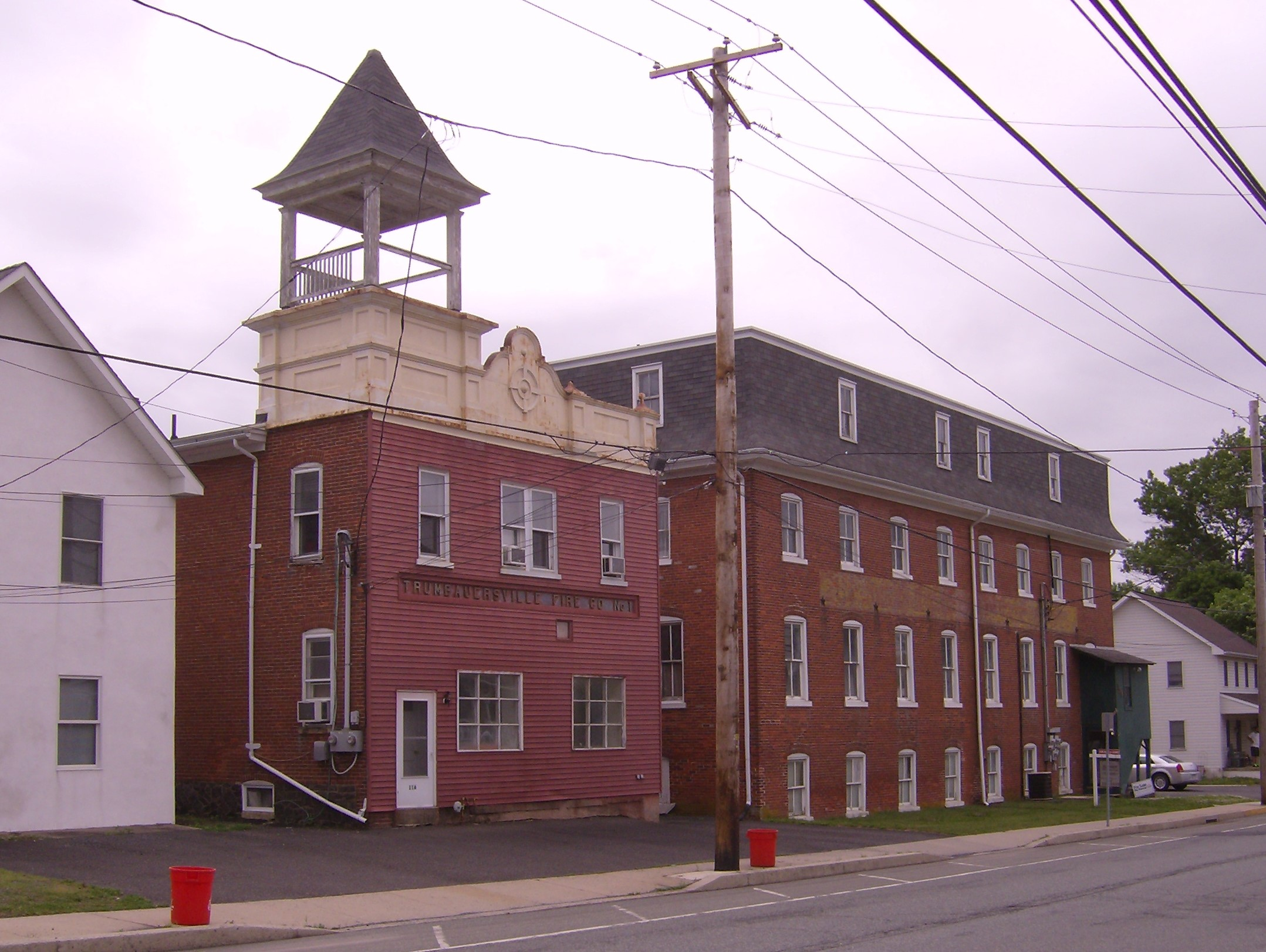
- Trumbauersville Fire Department

- Flag Seal

- Location in Bucks County, Pennsylvania

- Location in Pennsylvania Location in the United States
- Coordinates: 40°24′41″N 75°22′54″W
- Country: United States
- State: Pennsylvania
- County: Bucks
- Incorporated: 1908

Government
  - Mayor: James D Black

Area
  - Total: 0.44 sq mi (1.15 km^{2})
  - Land: 0.44 sq mi (1.15 km^{2})
  - Water: 0 sq mi (0.00 km^{2})
- Elevation: 538 ft (164 m)

Population (2020)
  - Total: 904
  - Density: 2,032.1/sq mi (784.58/km^{2})
- Time zone: UTC-5 (EST)
  - Summer (DST): UTC-4 (EDT)
- ZIP Code: 18970
- Area codes: 215, 267 and 445
- FIPS code: 42-77704
- Website: www.trumbauersvilleboro.org

Trumbauersville is a borough that is located in Bucks County, Pennsylvania, United States. As of the 2020 census, Trumbauersville had a population of 904.

== History ==
Trumbauersville was incorporated in 1908 and celebrated its centennial on May 2, 2008.

== Geography ==
Trumbauersville is located at 40°24′41″N 75°22′54″W (40.411305, -75.381577).

According to the United States Census Bureau, the borough has a total area of 0.4 square miles (1.0 km^{2}), all land.

== Demographics ==
Historical population
Census	Pop.	Note	%±
1910	611		—
1920	698		14.2%
1930	692		−0.9%
1940	746		7.8%
1950	838		12.3%
1960	785		−6.3%
1970	831		5.9%
1980	781		−6.0%
1990	894		14.5%
2000	1,059		18.5%
2010	974		−8.0%
2020	904		−7.2%
U.S. Decennial Census

As of the 2010 census, the borough was 95.4% White, 0.6% Black or African American, 0.3% Native American, 0.8% Asian, 0.1% Native Hawaiian or Other Pacific Islander, and 0.6% were two or more races. 3.1% of the population were of Hispanic or Latino ancestry.

As of the census of 2000, there were 1,059 people, 374 households, and 305 families residing in the borough.

The population density was 2,475.2 inhabitants per square mile (955.7/km^{2}). There were 382 housing units at an average density of 892.8 per square mile (344.7/km^{2}).

The racial makeup of the borough was 97.92% White, 0.57% African American, 0.66% Asian, 0.47% from other races, and 0.38% from two or more races. Hispanic or Latino of any race were 0.85% of the population.

There were 666 households, out of which 39.8% had children under the age of eighteen living with them; 69.0% were married couples living together, 7.8% had a female householder with no husband present, and 18.4% were non-families. 13.6% of all households were made up of individuals, and 4.5% had someone living alone who was sixty-five years of age or older.

The average household size was 2.82 and the average family size was 3.07.

Within the borough, the population was spread out, with 26.3% of residents who were under the age of eighteen, 6.6% who were aged eighteen to twenty-four, 32.4% who were aged twenty-five to forty-four, 23.2% who were aged forty-five to sixty-four, and 11.4% who were sixty-five years of age or older. The median age was thirty-seven years.

For every one hundred females, there were 96.8 males. For every one hundred females who were aged eighteen or older, there were 93.1 males.

The median income for a household in the borough was $52,250, and the median income for a family was $60,000. Males had a median income of $38,125 compared with that of $30,441 for females.

The per capita income for the borough was $20,778.

Approximately 1.9% of families and 5.6% of the population were living below the poverty line, including 5.9% of those who were under the age of eighteen and 4.9% of those who were aged sixty-five or older.

== Climate ==
According to the Köppen climate classification system, Trumbauersville has a Hot-summer, Humid continental climate (Dfa). Dfa climates are characterized by at least one month having an average mean temperature ≤ 32.0 °F (0.0 °C), at least four months with an average mean temperature ≥ 50.0 °F (10.0 °C), at least one month with an average mean temperature ≥ 71.6 °F (22.0 °C) and no significant precipitation difference between seasons. Although most summer days are slightly humid in Trumbauersville, episodes of heat and high humidity can occur with heat index values > 104 °F (40 °C).

Since 1981, the highest air temperature was 102.1 °F (38.9 °C) on July 22, 2011, and the highest daily average mean dew point was 74.5 °F (23.6 °C) on August 1, 2006. The average wettest month is July, which corresponds with the annual peak in thunderstorm activity. Since 1981, the wettest calendar day was 7.04 inches (179 mm) on September 30, 2010. During the winter months, the average annual extreme minimum air temperature is −1.7 °F (−18.7 °C).

Since 1981, the coldest air temperature was −13.6 °F (−25.3 °C) on January 21, 1994. Episodes of extreme cold and wind can occur, with wind chill values < −13 °F (−25 °C). The average annual snowfall (Nov-Apr) is between 30 inches (76 cm) and 36 inches (91 cm). Ice storms and large snowstorms depositing ≥ 12 inches (30 cm) of snow occur once every few years, particularly during nor’easters from December through February.

Climate data for Trumbauersville, Elevation 522 ft (159 m), 1981-2010 normals, extremes 1981-2018
Month	Jan	Feb	Mar	Apr	May	Jun	Jul	Aug	Sep	Oct	Nov	Dec	Year
Record high °F (°C)	69.8 (21.0)	77.6 (25.3)	86.1 (30.1)	92.3 (33.5)	93.9 (34.4)	95.2 (35.1)	102.1 (38.9)	98.7 (37.1)	96.3 (35.7)	88.9 (31.6)	79.4 (26.3)	74.1 (23.4)	102.1 (38.9)
Mean daily maximum °F (°C)	37.6 (3.1)	40.9 (4.9)	49.5 (9.7)	61.7 (16.5)	71.7 (22.1)	80.3 (26.8)	84.3 (29.1)	82.6 (28.1)	75.8 (24.3)	64.3 (17.9)	53.0 (11.7)	41.6 (5.3)	62.0 (16.7)
Daily mean °F (°C)	28.9 (−1.7)	31.5 (−0.3)	39.3 (4.1)	50.2 (10.1)	60.0 (15.6)	69.1 (20.6)	73.5 (23.1)	71.8 (22.1)	64.5 (18.1)	52.9 (11.6)	43.1 (6.2)	33.2 (0.7)	51.6 (10.9)
Mean daily minimum °F (°C)	20.2 (−6.6)	22.2 (−5.4)	29.1 (−1.6)	38.8 (3.8)	48.3 (9.1)	57.8 (14.3)	62.7 (17.1)	61.1 (16.2)	53.1 (11.7)	41.6 (5.3)	33.2 (0.7)	24.8 (−4.0)	41.2 (5.1)
Record low °F (°C)	−13.6 (−25.3)	−6.3 (−21.3)	1.1 (−17.2)	16.4 (−8.7)	30.5 (−0.8)	39.7 (4.3)	46.3 (7.9)	41.1 (5.1)	33.5 (0.8)	22.9 (−5.1)	10.2 (−12.1)	−2.7 (−19.3)	−13.6 (−25.3)
Average precipitation inches (mm)	3.47 (88)	2.82 (72)	3.73 (95)	4.06 (103)	4.33 (110)	4.34 (110)	4.80 (122)	3.86 (98)	4.60 (117)	4.35 (110)	3.76 (96)	4.01 (102)	48.13 (1,223)
Average relative humidity (%)	69.0	66.1	61.6	59.9	64.0	70.0	70.0	72.8	73.7	71.7	71.5	71.5	68.5
Average dew point °F (°C)	20.0 (−6.7)	21.5 (−5.8)	27.2 (−2.7)	36.8 (2.7)	47.8 (8.8)	58.9 (14.9)	63.1 (17.3)	62.6 (17.0)	55.9 (13.3)	44.0 (6.7)	34.5 (1.4)	25.0 (−3.9)	41.5 (5.3)
Source: PRISM

== Transportation ==
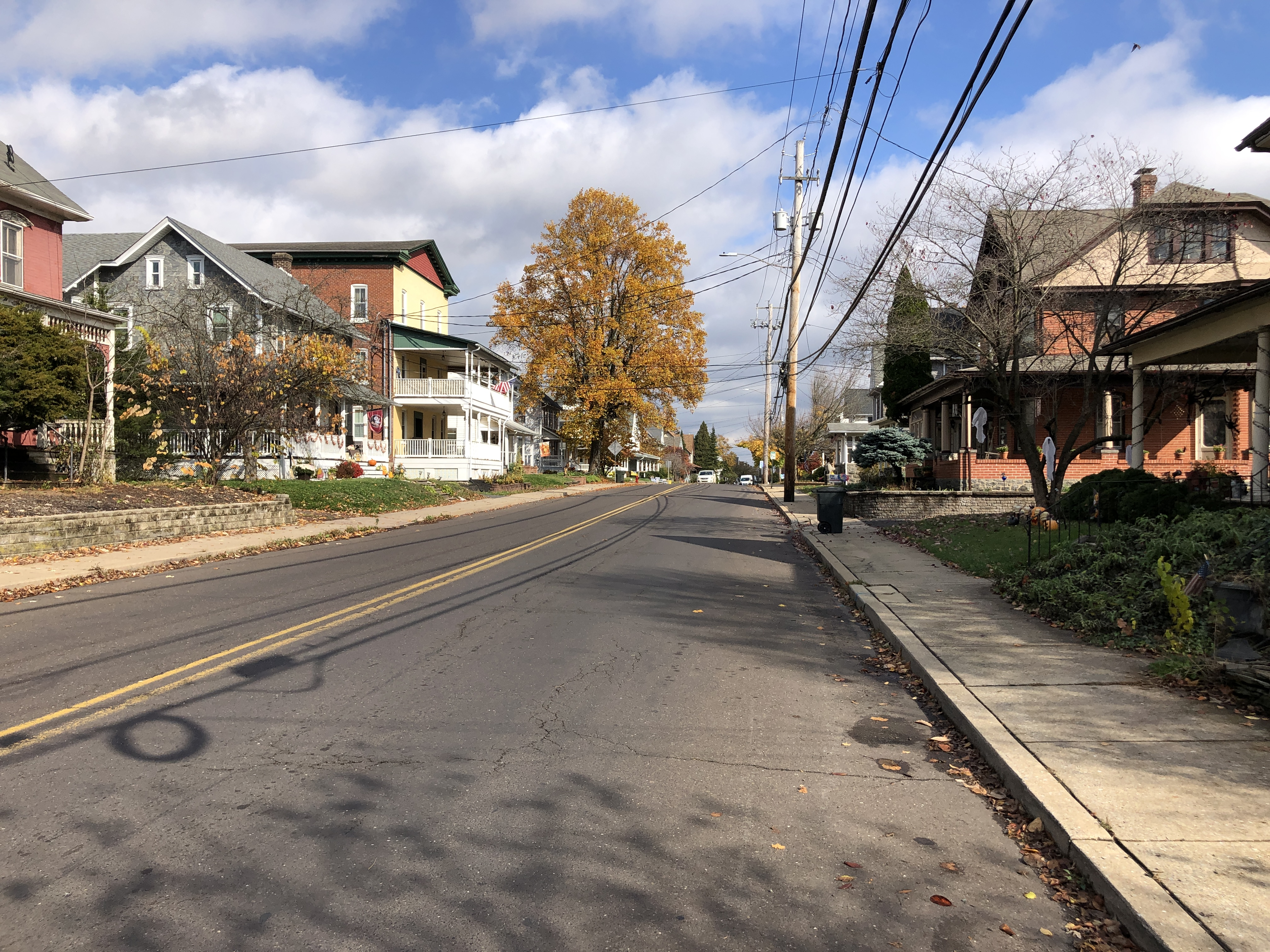
Broad Street in Trumbauersville

As of 2018 there were 3.74 miles (6.02 km) of public roads in Trumbauersville, of which 2.56 miles (4.12 km) were maintained by the Pennsylvania Department of Transportation (PennDOT) and 1.18 miles (1.90 km) were maintained by the borough.

No numbered highways serve Trumbauersville directly. The main thoroughfares in the borough are Broad Street, which follows a southwest-northeast alignment, and Main Street, which follows a northwest-southeast route. These two roads intersect near the center of town.

== Ecology ==
According to the A. W. Kuchler U.S. potential natural vegetation types, Trumbauersville would have a dominant vegetation type of Appalachian Oak (104) with a dominant vegetation form of Eastern Hardwood Forest (25). The plant hardiness zone is 6b with an average annual extreme minimum air temperature of −1.7 °F (−18.7 °C). The spring bloom typically begins by April 15 and fall color usually peaks by October 25.

== Education ==
Quakertown Community School District serves public school students in Trumbauersville. Trumbauersville Elementary School, in borough limits, serves students from Kindergarten to fifth grade. The Sixth Grade Center serves students in sixth grade, Strayer Middle School serves grades seven and eight, and Quakertown Community High School serves grades nine through twelve.

== Notable people ==
- Ducky Detweiler, an American professional baseball player and manager, Boston Braves
- John Fries, a Pennsylvania auctioneer and organizer of Fries's Rebellion
