= Gallows Run (Delaware River tributary) =

Gallows Run Gallows Hill Run, Kintnersville Creek
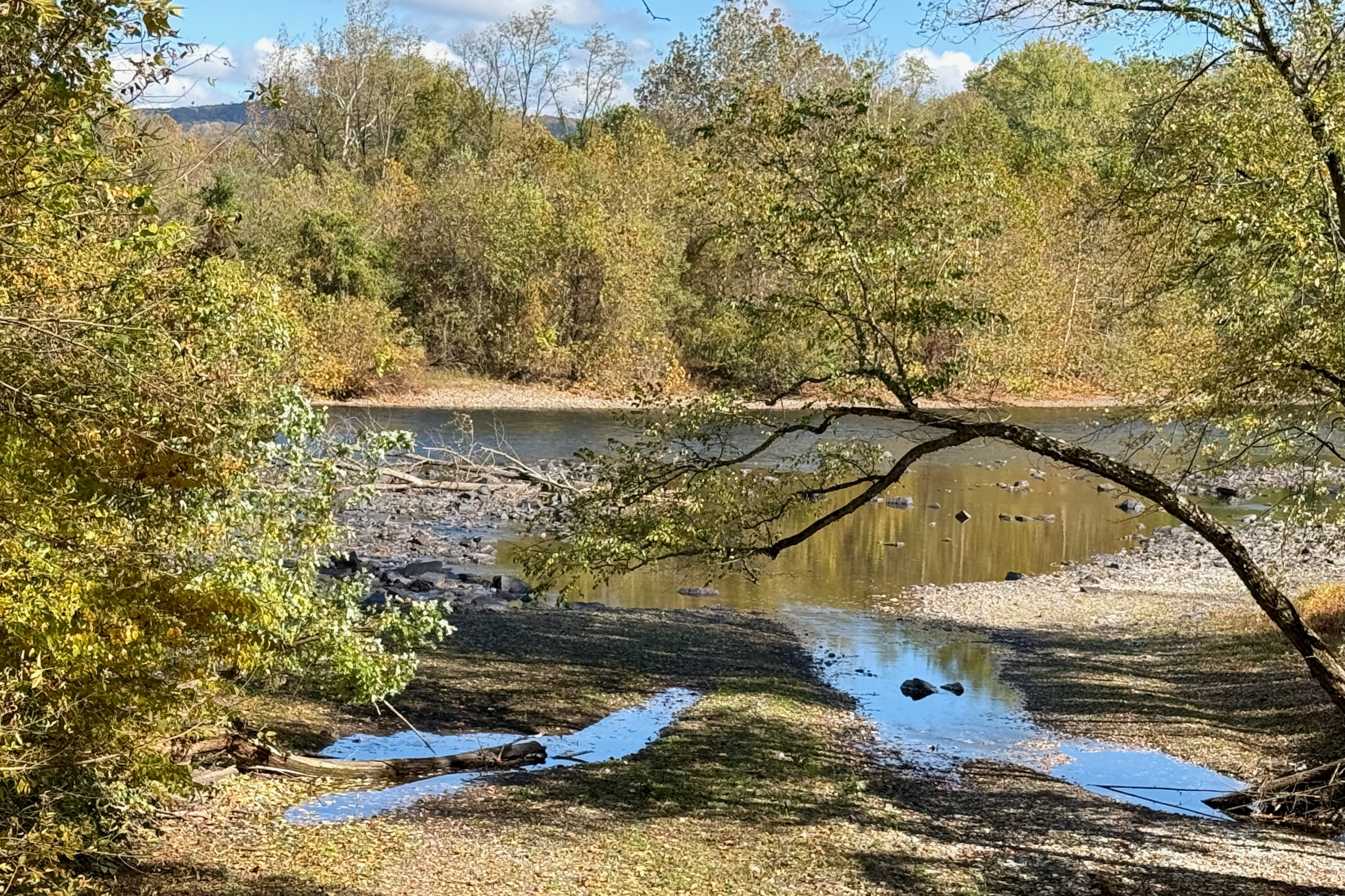
- Confluence with the Delaware River

- Gallows Run
- Native name: Pereletakon (Unami)

Location
- Country: United States
- State: Pennsylvania
- County: Bucks
- Township: Springfield
- Township: Nockamixon

Physical characteristics
- Source
  - coordinates: 40°32′39″N 75°13′58″W
  - elevation: 740 feet (230 m)
- Mouth: Delaware River
  - coordinates: 40°33′39″N 75°10′16″W
  - elevation: 141 feet (43 m)
- Length: 5.25 miles (8.45 km)
- Basin size: 8.72 square miles (22.6 km^{2})

Basin features
- Progression: Gallows Run→Delaware River
- River system: Delaware River
- Bridges: Buckwampum Road, Hunter Road, Gallows Hill Road, Traugers Crossing Road (two passes), Kintners Road, Pennsylvania Route 611 (Easton Road), Delaware Canal aqueduct and towpath

Gallows Run (Pereletakon, Gallows Hill Run, Kintnersville Creek) is a tributary of the Delaware River in Springfield and Nockamixon Townships, in Bucks County, Pennsylvania in the United States.

== Statistics ==
Gallows Run was entered into the Geographic Names Information System of the U.S. Geological Survey on 2 August 1979 as identification number 1175398, and is listed in the Pennsylvania Gazetteer of Streams as identification number 3278. The stream has a watershed of 8.72 square miles (22.6 km^{2}) and meets its confluence at the Delaware River's 171.8 river mile. The Total length of the Creek is 5.25 miles (8.45 km), the total elevation change is 599 feet (183 m). The average slope, therefore is approximately 114 feet per mile (22.1 meters per kilometer).

== Course ==
Gallows Run rises on the southern slope of Buckwampum Mountain in Springfield Township and is oriented south for about 0.66 miles (1.06 km) then turns east northeast for about 1.4 miles (2.3 km) where it receives a tributary from the left, and flows southeast. After another 0.75 miles (1.21 km) it receives another tributary from the right and turns to the east for another 0.7 miles (1.1 km) where it enters Nockamixon Township and receives another tributary from the left. Continuing northeast for 0.37 miles (0.60 km) it turns sharply north picking up two more tributaries from the right. Going north, it receives a tributary from the left, then from the right, then finally from the left, where it curves right, crosses under the aqueduct for the Delaware Canal, and finally meets the Delaware River.

== History ==
Gallows Run was sometimes referred to as Gallows Hill Run. The lower portion was also sometimes referred as Kintnersville Creek. The mouth of Gallows Run empties into the Delaware adjacent to an island in some old sources named Laughreys Island, some maps today refer to it as Lynn Island. The island is unlabeled in the National Map. A deed for the Durham Iron Works of 10 February 1727 names the stream Pereletakon, seemingly referring to a Lenape name. William J. Buck was the first to attempt an explanation for the name Gallows Hill and Gallows Run as the finding the body of a man who committed suicide by hanging on Gallows Hill, but that was disputed by Warren S. Ely, Librarian for the Bucks County Historical Society, by stating that it was that Edward Marshall, one of the runners of the Walking Purchase broke his gallowses (trouser braces) when he jumped across the creek, so, he hung his gallowses on a tree branch at the run, hence the name "Gallows Run". Marshall refers to the point where he left Durham in his deposition of 1757 as Gallows Hill. The will of Bartholomew Longstreth, of Warminster Township refers to a property he sold to Joseph Robinson of Rockhill Township on Gallows Hill on 5 June 1741. This was only fours years after the 'walk'. Near the mouth of Gallows Run was the site of a Lenape village known as Pechoqueolin, one of the largest native villages in Bucks County discovered by John A. Ruth noted in a paper read to the Bucks County Historical Society on 27 July 1886.

== Geology ==
- Appalachian Highlands Division
  - Piedmont Province
    - Gettysburg-Newark Lowland Section
      - Brunswick Formation
      - Diabase
      - Quartz Fanglomerate
- Atlantic Plain
  - Atlantic Coastal Plain Province
    - Lowland and Intermediate Upland Section
      - Trenton Gravel

Gallows Run begins in a bed of Quartz Fanglomerate, laid down during the Triassic and Jurassic, consisting of cobbles and boulders of quartzite, sandstone, quartz, and some metarhyolite in red sand. Turn to the eastern leg, it passes through the Brunswick Formation, also laid during the Triassic and Jurassic, consisting of mudstone and siltstone with beds of shale. Mineralogy includes argillite and hornfels. As it approaches the Delaware, it finally passes through the Trenton Gravel bed, formed during the Quaternary (current geological age), and consists of sand, clay, and silt.

== Crossings and bridges ==
Crossing	NBI Number	Length	Lanes	Spans	Material/Design	Built	Reconstructed	Latitude	Longitude
Buckwampum Road	-	-	-	-	-	-	-	-	-
Hunter Road	-	-	-	-	-	-	-	-	-
Gallows Hill Road	-	-	-	-	-	-	-	-	-
Traugers Crossing Road	7627	11 metres (36 ft)	2	2	Continuous steel stringer/multi-beam or girder	1950	1965	40°32'37.8"N	75°10'5939"W
Traugers Crossing Road	7626	8 metres (26 ft)	2	1	Steel Stringer/Multi-beam or Girder	1940	-	40°32'31.9"N	75°11'8.6"W
Kintners Road	7586	14 metres (46 ft)	1	1	Steel truss - thru	-	2014	40°33'21.6"N	75°11'2.4"W
Pennsylvania Route 611 (Easton Road)	47933	20 metres (66 ft)	3	1	Prestressed concrete box beam or girders - single or spread	2013	-	40°33'30"N	75°10'42"W
Delaware Canal Gallows Run Aqueduct	-	-	-	-	-	-	-	40°33'39.7"N	75°10'17.9"W

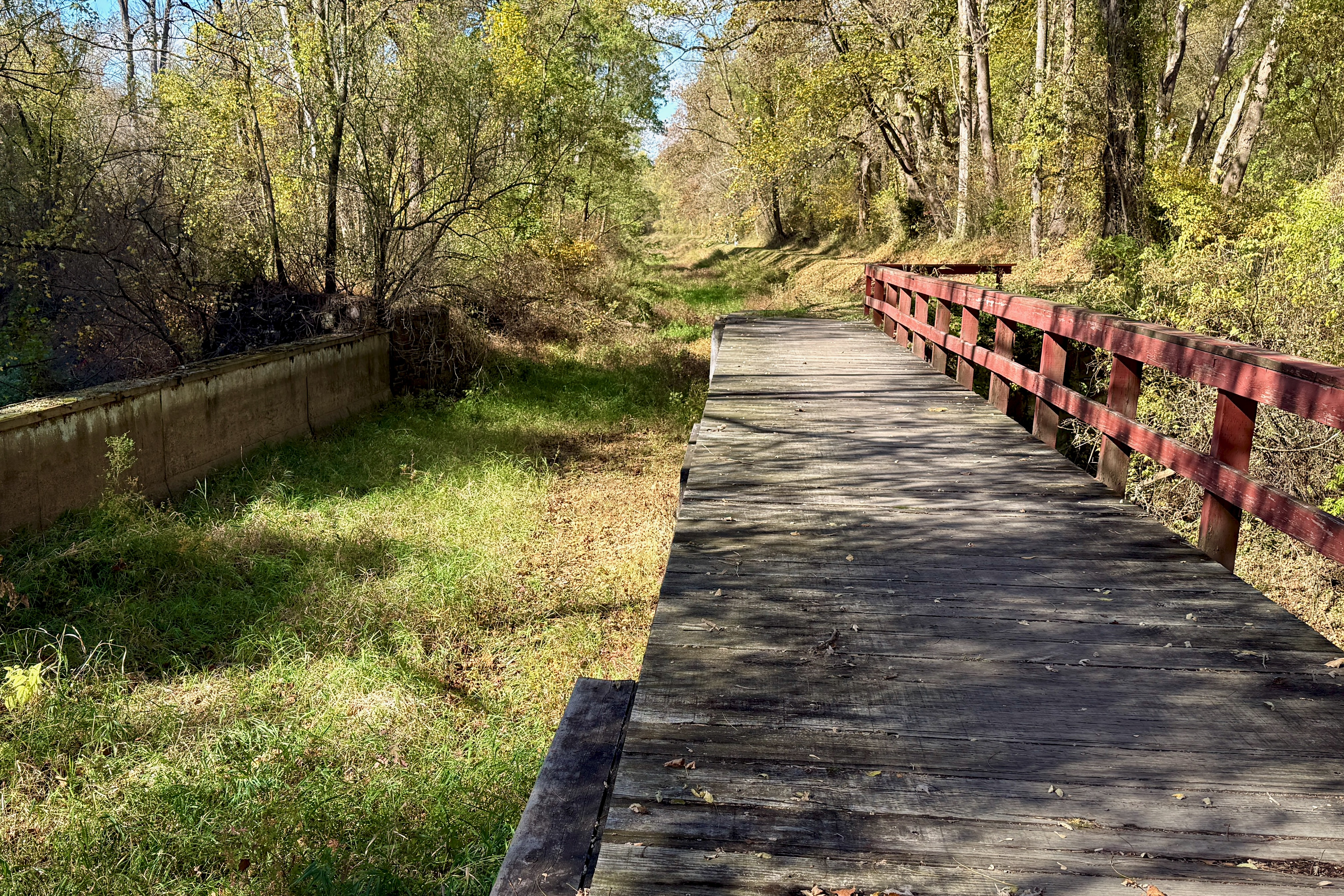
Gallows Run Aqueduct
