= Revere, Pennsylvania =

Unincorporated community in Pennsylvania, US

- Unincorporated community
- Location within Pennsylvania Location within the United States
- Coordinates: 40°30′55″N 75°09′40″W
- Country: United States
- State: Pennsylvania
- County: Bucks
- Township: Nockamixon
- Elevation: 502 ft (153 m)
- Time zone: UTC-5 (Eastern (EST))
  - Summer (DST): UTC-4 (EDT)
- ZIP Code: 18953
- Area codes: 610 and 484
- GNIS feature ID: 1184953

Revere is an unincorporated community in Nockamixon Township in Bucks County, Pennsylvania, United States. Revere is located at the intersection of Pennsylvania Route 611 and Marienstein Road. Residents of Revere are part of the Palisades School District.
