= Ferndale, Bucks County, Pennsylvania =

Unincorporated community in Pennsylvania, US

Ferndale, Pennsylvania
- Unincorporated community
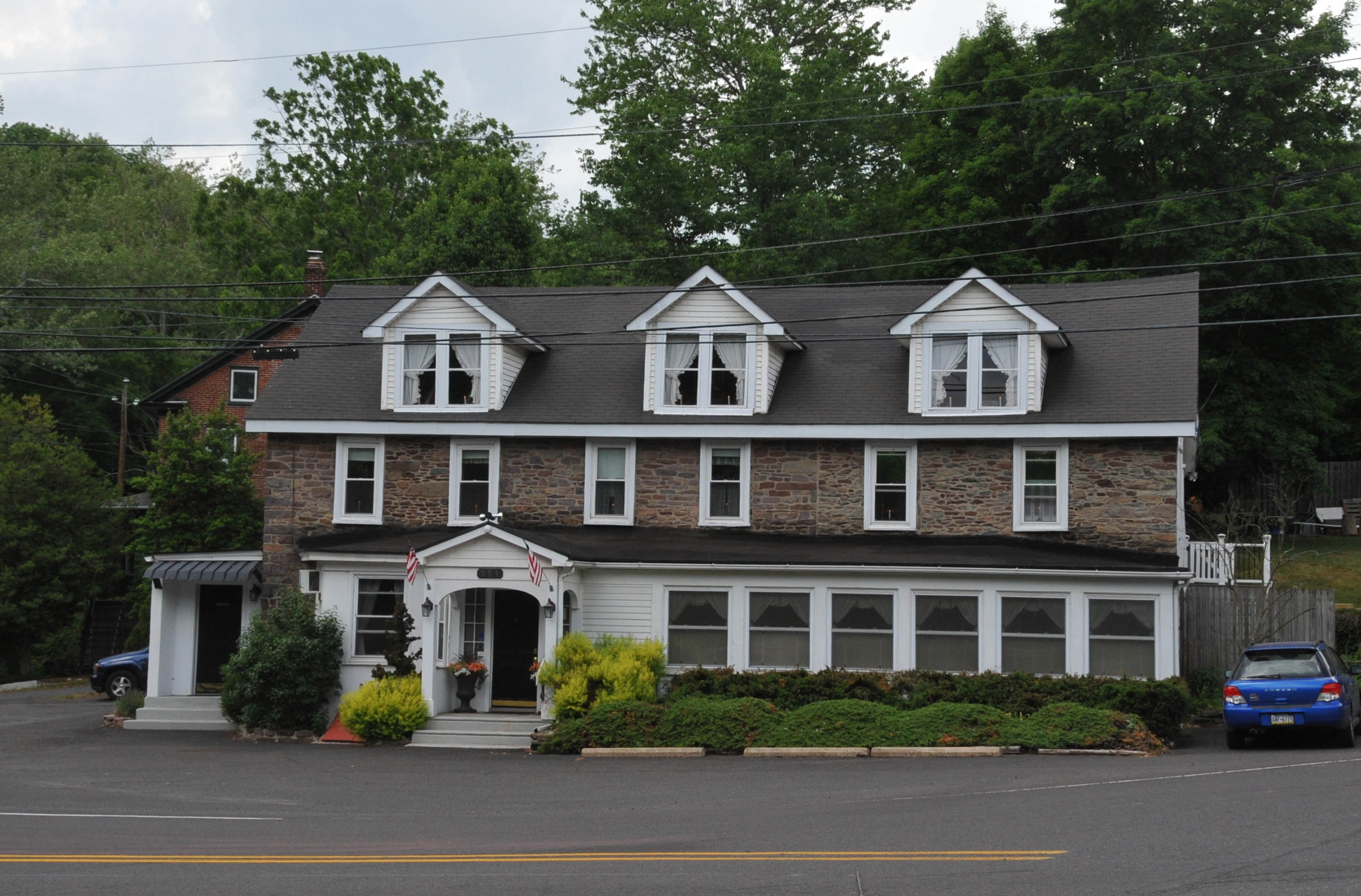
- Ferndale Inn

- Location within Pennsylvania Location within the United States
- Coordinates: 40°32′01″N 75°10′44″W
- Country: United States
- State: Pennsylvania
- County: Bucks
- Township: Nockamixon
- Elevation: 299 ft (91 m)
- Time zone: UTC-5 (Eastern (EST))
  - Summer (DST): UTC-4 (EDT)
- ZIP Code: 18921
- Area codes: 610 and 484
- GNIS feature ID: 1174701

Ferndale is an unincorporated community in Nockamixon Township in Bucks County, Pennsylvania, United States. Ferndale is located at the intersection of Pennsylvania Route 611 and Church Hill Road/Center Hill Road.
