= Pennsylvania Route 611 =

State highway in Pennsylvania, US

Pennsylvania Route 611

Route information
- Maintained by PennDOT, City of Philadelphia, and City of Easton
- Length: 109.685 mi (176.521 km)
- Existed: March 14, 1972–present
- Tourist routes: Delaware River Valley Scenic Byway

Major junctions
- South end: I-95 / Broad Street in Philadelphia
- I-76 in Philadelphia; I-676 / US 30 in Philadelphia; US 1 / US 13 in Philadelphia; PA 309 at the Philadelphia–Cheltenham line; I-276 Toll / Penna Turnpike in Willow Grove; US 202 in Doylestown; US 22 / PA 248 in Easton; Route 94 in Portland; I-80 / US 209 in Stroudsburg; I-80 / PA 33 in Stroud Township
- North end: I-380 in Coolbaugh Township

Location
- Country: United States
- State: Pennsylvania
- Counties: Philadelphia, Montgomery, Bucks, Northampton, Monroe

Highway system
- Pennsylvania State Route System; Interstate; US; State; Scenic; Legislative
← PA 607	→ PA 612
← PA 301	PA 302	→ PA 303
← PA 826	PA 827	→ PA 828

Pennsylvania Route 611 (PA 611) is a state highway in eastern Pennsylvania running 109.7 mi (176.5 km) from Interstate 95 (I-95) in the southern part of Philadelphia north to I-380 in Coolbaugh Township in the Pocono Mountains.

Through most of Philadelphia, PA 611 follows Broad Street, the main north-south street in Philadelphia. The route continues north through the northern suburbs of Philadelphia and serves Jenkintown, Willow Grove, and Doylestown, the latter of which it bypasses on a freeway. North of Doylestown, PA 611 heads through rural areas and runs along the west bank of the Delaware River to Easton in the Lehigh Valley. The route continues back into rural land and passes through the Delaware Water Gap, at which point it enters the Pocono Mountains region, heading northwest through Stroudsburg and Mount Pocono toward its northern terminus.

The current alignment of PA 611 is composed of several turnpikes that were built in the 19th century. What is now PA 611 was designated as part of U.S. Route 611 (US 611) in 1926, a U.S. highway that ran from Philadelphia City Hall in Philadelphia north to US 11 in Scranton. US 611 was designated along part of the Lackawanna Trail, which carried the PA 2 designation between 1924 and 1928. The location of the route's northern terminus in the Scranton region has changed numerous times.

In the 1930s, US 611 underwent two realignments along the stretch of the road connecting Easton and Stroudsburg. In 1953, US 611 was moved to a new alignment between Portland and Delaware Water Gap that crossed the Delaware River twice and ran through a section of New Jersey, with the former alignment becoming US 611 Alternate (US 611 Alt.). The alignment of the route in New Jersey and across the Delaware Water Gap back into Pennsylvania became part of I-80; US 611 was shifted back to its Pennsylvania alignment in 1965, replacing US 611 Alt.

US 611 was decommissioned in 1972 and the route was replaced with PA 611 between Philadelphia City Hall in Philadelphia, I-81E (now I-380) in Tobyhanna, and PA 435 between I-81E in Gouldsboro and I-81E in Dunmore. PA 611 was moved to a freeway bypass of Doylestown in 1976. The route was extended south from Philadelphia City Hall to its present terminus at I-95 in the 1980s, replacing a section of PA 291.

== Route description ==
=== Philadelphia County ===
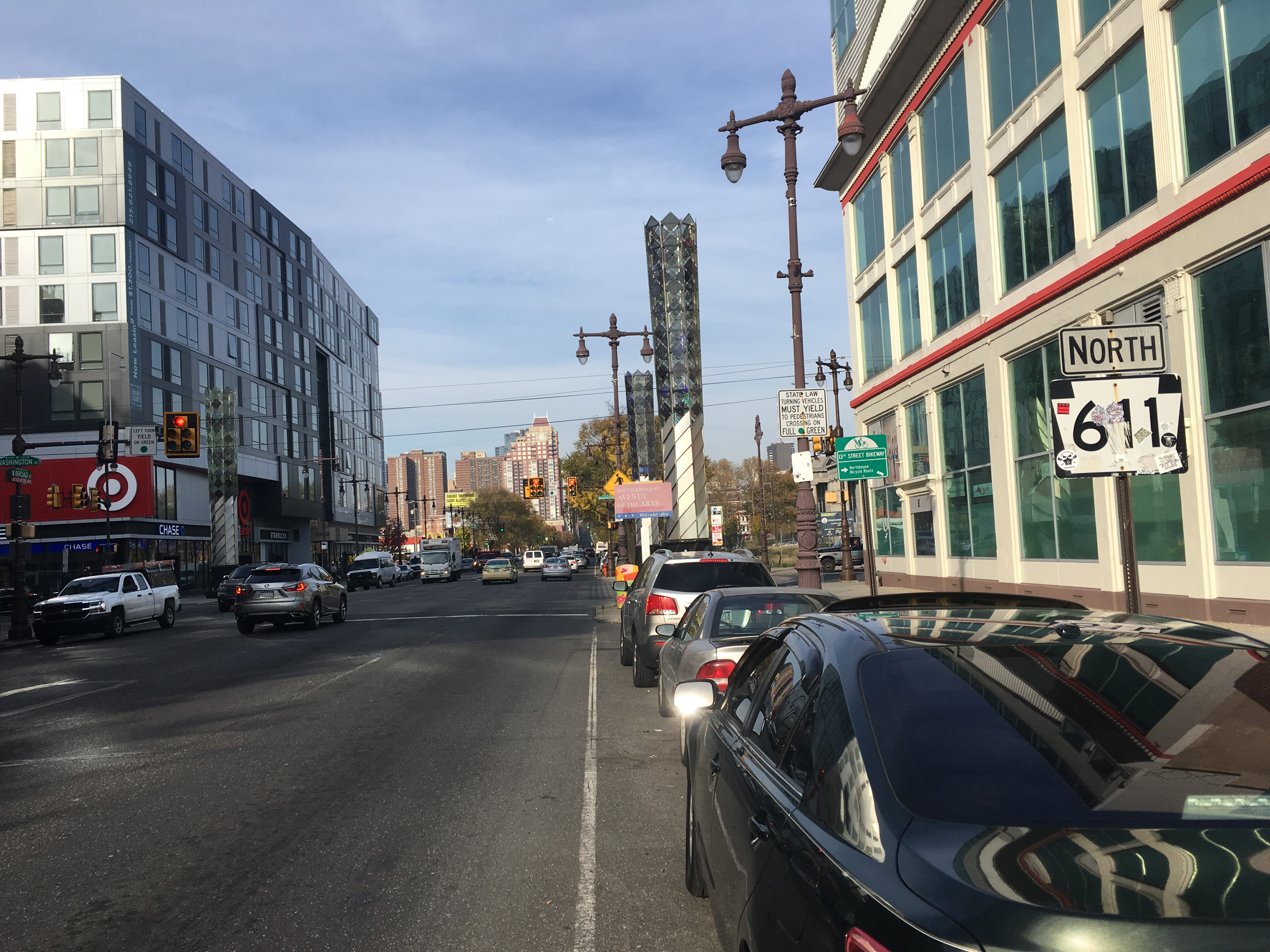
PA 611 northbound on Broad Street at Washington Avenue in South Philadelphia

PA 611 begins at an interchange with I-95 (Delaware Expressway) in the South Philadelphia section of Philadelphia in Philadelphia County, heading north on Broad Street. South of I-95, Broad Street continues into The Navy Yard, a mixed-use development that is located at the former Philadelphia Naval Shipyard.

From the southern terminus, the route follows an eight-lane divided section of Broad Street that is also known as the Southern Boulevard Parkway, running between Franklin Delano Roosevelt Park to the west and the South Philadelphia Sports Complex to the east. At Pattison Avenue, SEPTA's Broad Street Line, a subway line, begins to run under the route from its southern terminus at NRG Station. Past the sports complex, the road runs through urban neighborhoods and comes to an interchange with I-76 (Schuylkill Expressway), which heads west across Philadelphia and east toward the Walt Whitman Bridge over the Delaware River into New Jersey.

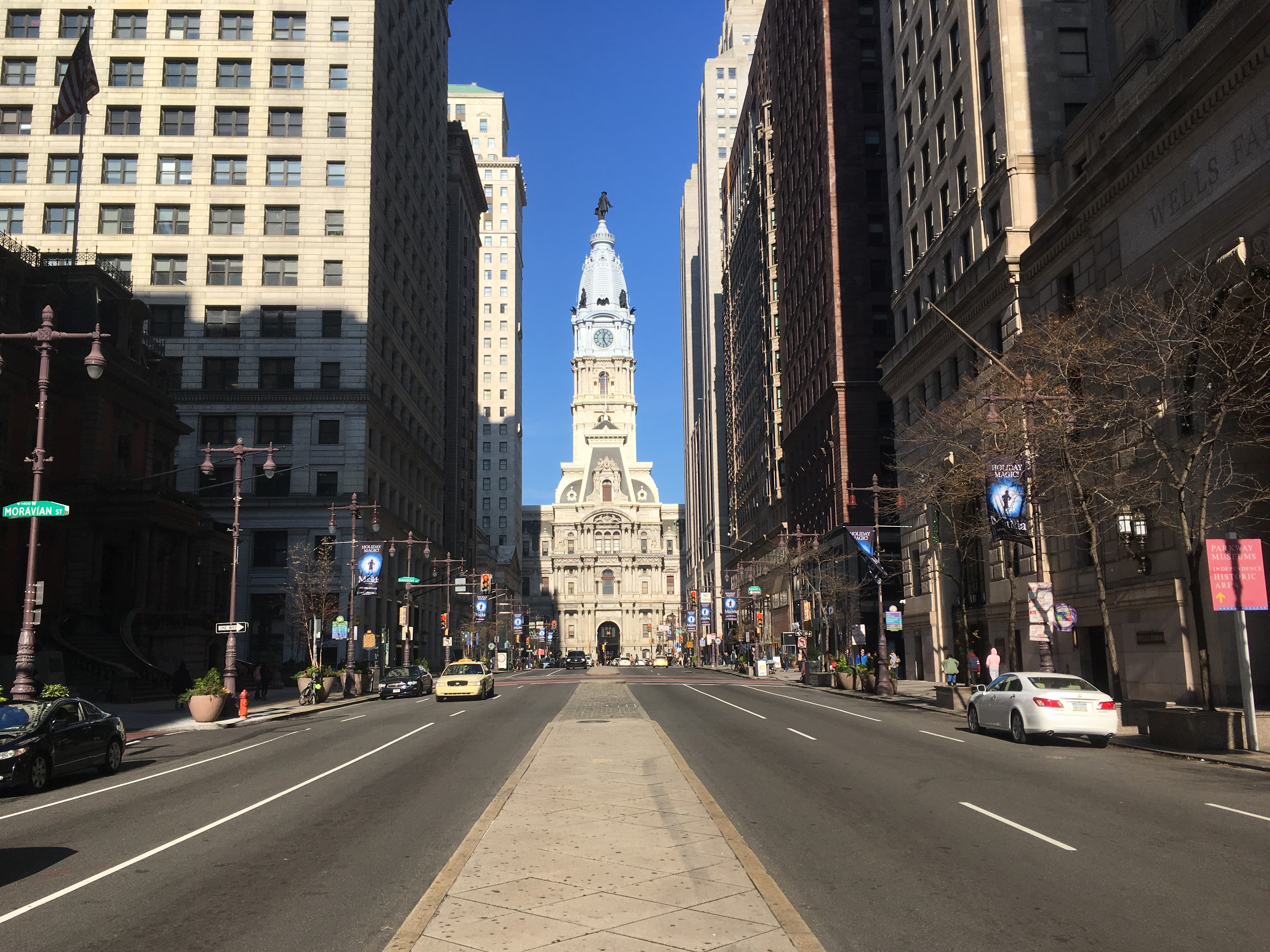
PA 611 northbound on Broad Street in Center City Philadelphia, approaching Philadelphia City Hall

Following this interchange, PA 611 narrows to a four-lane divided road and passes through Marconi Plaza before intersecting the eastern terminus of PA 291 at Oregon Avenue and Moyamensing Avenue. The route continues north as a four-lane road with alternating divided and undivided stretches through urban residential and commercial areas in South Philadelphia, passing to the west of Jefferson Methodist Hospital between Ritner Street and Wolf Street.

PA 611 runs to the west of South Philadelphia High School between Jackson Street and Snyder Avenue and to the east of Constitution Health Plaza between Passyunk Avenue/McKean Street and Mifflin Street. Farther north, the road crosses Washington Avenue, where it becomes the Avenue of the Arts (in addition to Broad Street), and heads west of the Philadelphia High School for the Creative and Performing Arts between Carpenter Street and Christian Street. PA 611 intersects South Street and Lombard Street, at which point it heads into Center City Philadelphia.

The route then transitions to a six-lane divided highway and runs past commercial development and high-rise buildings, including several theaters. The road passes to the east of the former University of the Arts and the Kimmel Center for the Performing Arts between the Pine Street and Spruce Street intersections and heads east of the Academy of Music at the Locust Street intersection. The route crosses Walnut Street and Chestnut Street before it comes to Penn Square, a square-shaped traffic circle that runs around Philadelphia City Hall which is formed by South Penn Square to the south, Juniper Street to the east, John F. Kennedy Boulevard to the north, and 15th Street to the west.

At Penn Square, PA 611 intersects Market Street along with the eastern terminus of PA 3, which is routed on the one-way pair of Market Street eastbound and John F. Kennedy Boulevard westbound.

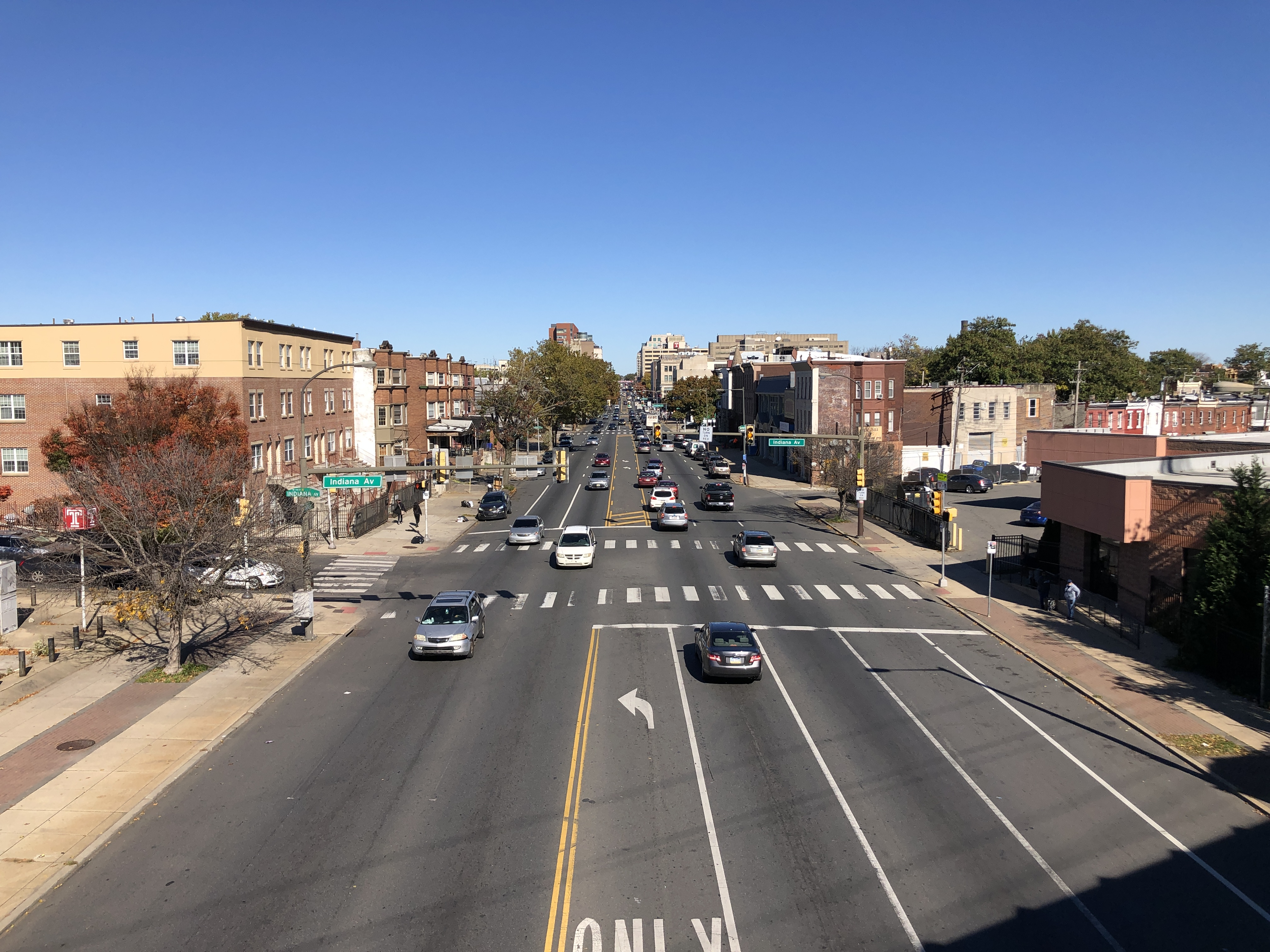
PA 611 northbound on Broad Street at Indiana Avenue in North Philadelphia

Past Penn Square, PA 611 continues north along six-lane divided Broad Street through more commercial development and high-rise buildings in Center City. The road passes to the west of the Pennsylvania Convention Center between Arch Street and Race Street and to the east of the former Hahnemann University Hospital between Race Street and Vine Street.

At Vine Street, the route comes to an interchange with I-676/US 30 (Vine Street Expressway), with access provided by the Vine Street frontage road. Roman Catholic High School is located east of the road just north of Vine Street. Following this, PA 611 passes more commercial development and crosses Spring Garden Street before running to the east of Benjamin Franklin High School.

The road then heads out of Center City and into North Philadelphia. The route continues north as a four-lane road with alternating divided and undivided stretches through urban residential and commercial development, crossing Ridge Avenue/Fairmount Avenue and Girard Avenue, the latter of which carries SEPTA's Route 15 trolley line. The road enters Cecil B. Moore and crosses Cecil B. Moore Avenue as it heads through the Temple University campus, passing to the east of the Liacouras Center multi-purpose arena between Cecil B. Moore Avenue and Montgomery Avenue. PA 611 leaves the university campus at the Diamond Street intersection and runs past more urban homes and businesses, crossing Dauphin Street and continuing into Glenwood.

Just south of the Lehigh Avenue intersection, the road passes over SEPTA's Main Line north of the North Broad station. After the Glenwood Avenue junction, the route passes under Amtrak's Northeast Corridor railroad line east of the North Philadelphia station serving Amtrak and SEPTA's Trenton Line and Chestnut Hill West Line. PA 611 heads into the Nicetown–Tioga section of Philadelphia and crosses Allegheny Avenue, at which point it runs to the west of the Maurice H. Kornberg School of Dentistry before intersecting Westmoreland Street/Rising Sun Avenue. The route passes between the Temple University School of Medicine to the west and Temple University Hospital and Shriners Hospital for Children to the east between Ontario Street and Venango Street. The road continues through urban areas as a five-lane road with a center left-turn lane and intersects Erie Avenue and Germantown Avenue before passing over Conrail Shared Assets Operations' Richmond Industrial Track line south of Lycoming Street. The route crosses Hunting Park Avenue before it comes to a junction with US 13 (Roosevelt Boulevard), where left turns are prohibited. A short distance later, PA 611 reaches a partial interchange with US 1 (Roosevelt Expressway), with access to southbound US 1 via Cayuga Street and from northbound US 1 via St. Lukes Street. The missing movements to and from US 1 are provided by US 13.

Past US 1, the route continues north through the Logan section of Philadelphia. After crossing Windrim Avenue, the road passes under railroad tracks carrying CSX's Trenton Subdivision line and SEPTA's Main Line. PA 611 continues past more urban homes and runs to the west of Jefferson Einstein Philadelphia Hospital between Somerville Avenue and Tabor Road. The route heads between the Philadelphia High School for Girls to the west and SEPTA's Olney Transportation Center to the east before it crosses Olney Avenue and Old York Road in a commercial area. At Grange Avenue, the Broad Street Line splits to the east to head toward its northern terminus at the Fern Rock Transportation Center. The road runs past urban homes and businesses, intersecting Stenton Avenue/Godfrey Avenue, as it continues into East Oak Lane. Here, PA 611 splits from Broad Street to head north-northeast along two-lane undivided Old York Road, passing more residences and businesses. The route comes to an interchange with the southern terminus of PA 309 at Cheltenham Avenue on the northern border of Philadelphia.

=== Montgomery County ===
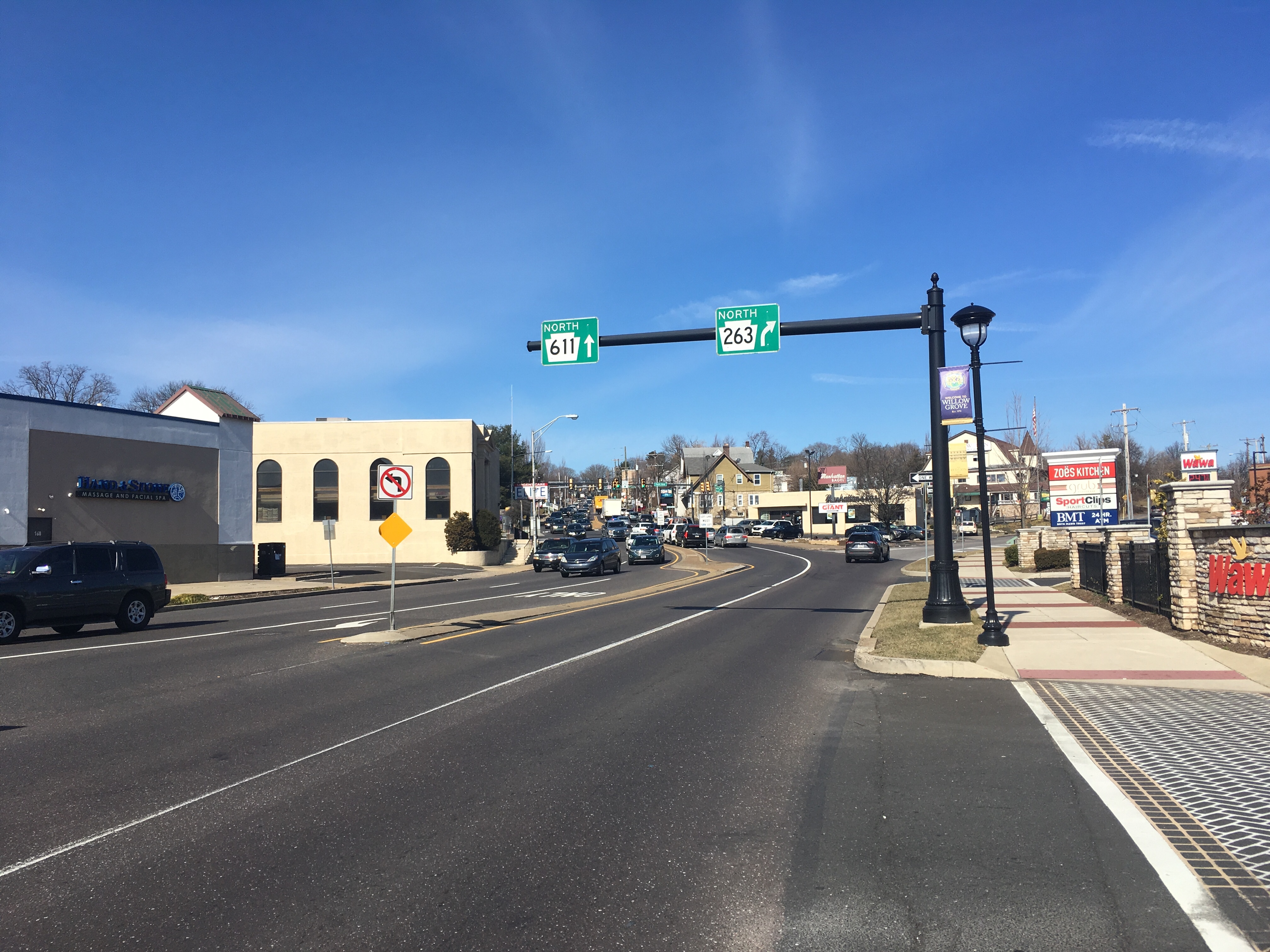
PA 611 northbound at southern terminus of PA 263 in Willow Grove

At the interchange with PA 309, PA 611 enters Cheltenham Township in Montgomery County and continues north along four-lane divided Old York Road, running past businesses before heading through Melrose Park and passing west of Gratz College. The road curves northeast at the Ashbourne Road intersection and passes under SEPTA's Main Line, at which point it heads into Elkins Park and runs past businesses, crossing Church Road and the Tacony Creek. The route turns back to the north and passes more residential development, heading to the east of Salus University before coming to an intersection with PA 73. Upon crossing PA 73, PA 611 enters Abington Township and passes east of a high-rise apartment complex as it runs through commercial areas, becoming the border between the borough of Jenkintown to the west and Abington Township to the east.

The route fully enters Jenkintown and turns into four-lane undivided York Road, heading through the downtown area. The road passes more commercial development and becomes the border between Abington Township to the west and Jenkintown to the east. PA 611 fully enters Abington Township again and turns into a divided highway called Old York Road, coming to a bridge over SEPTA's West Trenton Line west of the Noble station in Noble. The route continues north past businesses along with a few nearby homes, bending to the north-northeast. The road runs through Abington Township, where it reaches a junction with Susquehanna Road and heads to the east of Jefferson Abington Hospital. PA 611 continues north past more commercial development, passing under Edge Hill Road. Farther north, the route crosses Old Welsh Road before it comes to an intersection with PA 63, at which point it enters Upper Moreland Township. Here, the road becomes undivided North York Road and heads into Willow Grove, curving northwest and crossing Davisville Road and then SEPTA's Warminster Line at-grade south of the Willow Grove station.

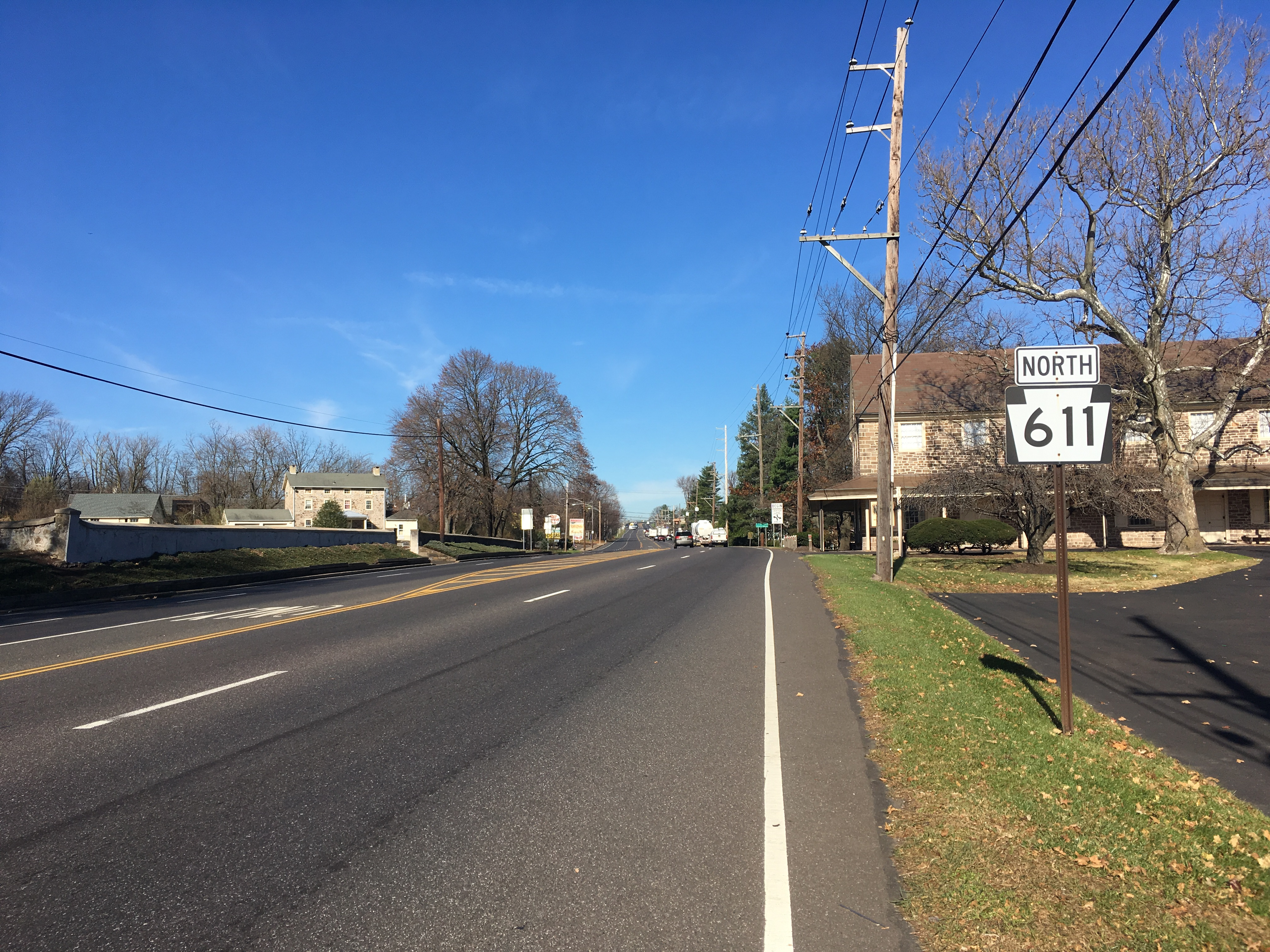
PA 611 northbound in Horsham

Past the train station, PA 611 intersects Easton Road, where it continues north along four-lane divided Easton Road. A short distance later, the route comes to a junction with the southern terminus of PA 263, which splits to the northeast along North York Road. This intersection has no direct access from southbound PA 611 to PA 263. Past this junction, PA 611 heads northwest as a four-lane undivided road past a mix of suburban homes and businesses. The road curves north and briefly becomes a divided highway at the Fitzwatertown Road intersection before passing more commercial development and crossing under Norfolk Southern's Morrisville Line. The route transitions into a divided highway again and reaches the Willow Grove interchange with the Pennsylvania Turnpike (I-276); this interchange is a double trumpet interchange. Past this interchange, the road widens to a six-lane divided highway and runs past businesses. Upon crossing Blair Mill Road, PA 611 heads into Horsham Township and turns into a five-lane road with a center left-turn lane.

The route then becomes a four-lane divided highway and curves northwest, crossing Pennypack Creek and coming to a junction with the eastern terminus of PA 463 in Horsham. This intersection has no direct access from PA 463 to northbound PA 611. A short distance later, the road intersects Dresher Road/Meetinghouse Road near Horsham Friends Meeting, with Dresher Road providing access to PA 463. PA 611 bends to the north-northwest and the median becomes a center turn lane, with the route passing more development and becoming the eastern border of the Biddle Air National Guard Base. The road runs through Hallowell and continues north between the air station to the west and commercial development to the east, coming to an intersection with County Line Road.

=== Bucks County ===
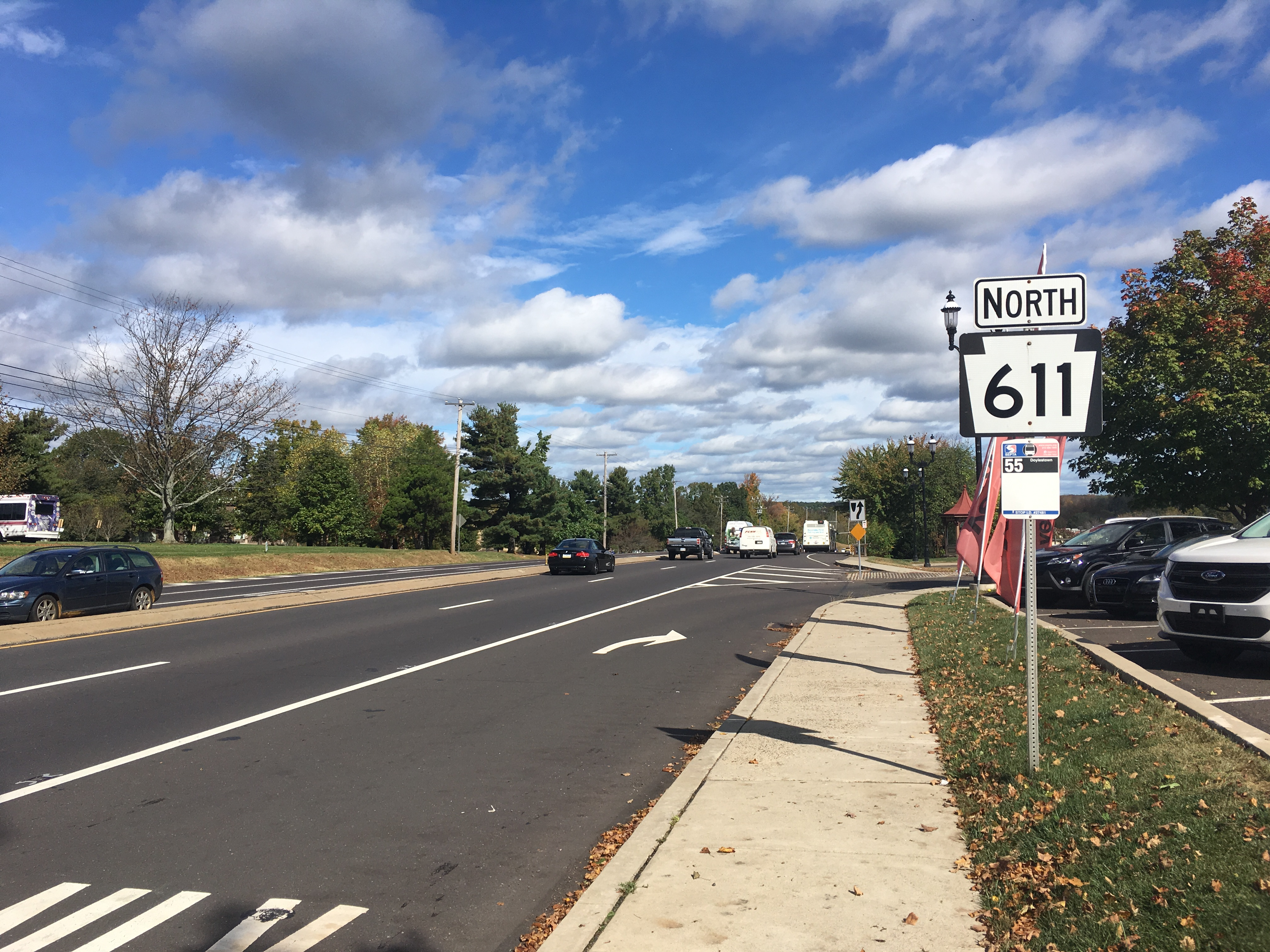
PA 611 northbound past Almshouse Road in Doylestown Township

Upon crossing County Line Road, PA 611 enters Warrington Township in Bucks County and continues north past multiple shopping centers. The road crosses Little Neshaminy Creek and curves northeast past more commercial development, coming to an intersection with the western terminus of PA 132 at Street Road in Neshaminy, where it is briefly a divided highway. Past this intersection, the route heads to the west of The Shops at Valley Square and becomes a five-lane road with a center left-turn lane that runs north through suburban residential and commercial development.

PA 611 bends to the north-northeast and turns into a divided highway as it reaches an intersection with Bristol Road in Warrington. The road loses the median for a center turn lane again and runs through wooded areas with some homes, passing to the east of a quarry. The route enters Doylestown Township and becomes a four-lane divided highway, heading past commercial development and intersecting Almshouse Road. PA 611 transitions to a five-lane road with a center turn lane and crosses Neshaminy Creek, passing through Edison.

North of here, the route becomes a four-lane freeway called the Doylestown Bypass, which bypasses the borough of Doylestown to the west. The first interchange is a northbound exit and southbound entrance for Main Street, which heads north into Doylestown. The freeway continues northwest through wooded areas with nearby development and comes to a cloverleaf interchange with US 202, which heads northeast as a freeway and southwest as a two-lane undivided expressway-grade parkway. Past US 202, PA 611 passes over SEPTA's Lansdale/Doylestown Line. The freeway curves north to reach a partial cloverleaf interchange with the northern terminus of US 202 Bus. at State Street; this interchange serves Doylestown Hospital to the east of the road. The route bends northeast as it runs near residential and commercial development, coming to a diamond interchange with Broad Street that provides access to the Bucks County Courthouse.

Past this interchange, the freeway passes through a small section of the borough of Doylestown before heading back into Doylestown Township and reaching a northbound exit and southbound entrance serving PA 313. At this point, PA 611 enters Plumstead Township and continues north, crossing Pine Run. The freeway ends and merges onto North Easton Road, with a southbound exit and northbound entrance for North Easton Road, which provides access to PA 313 and becomes Main Street in Doylestown.

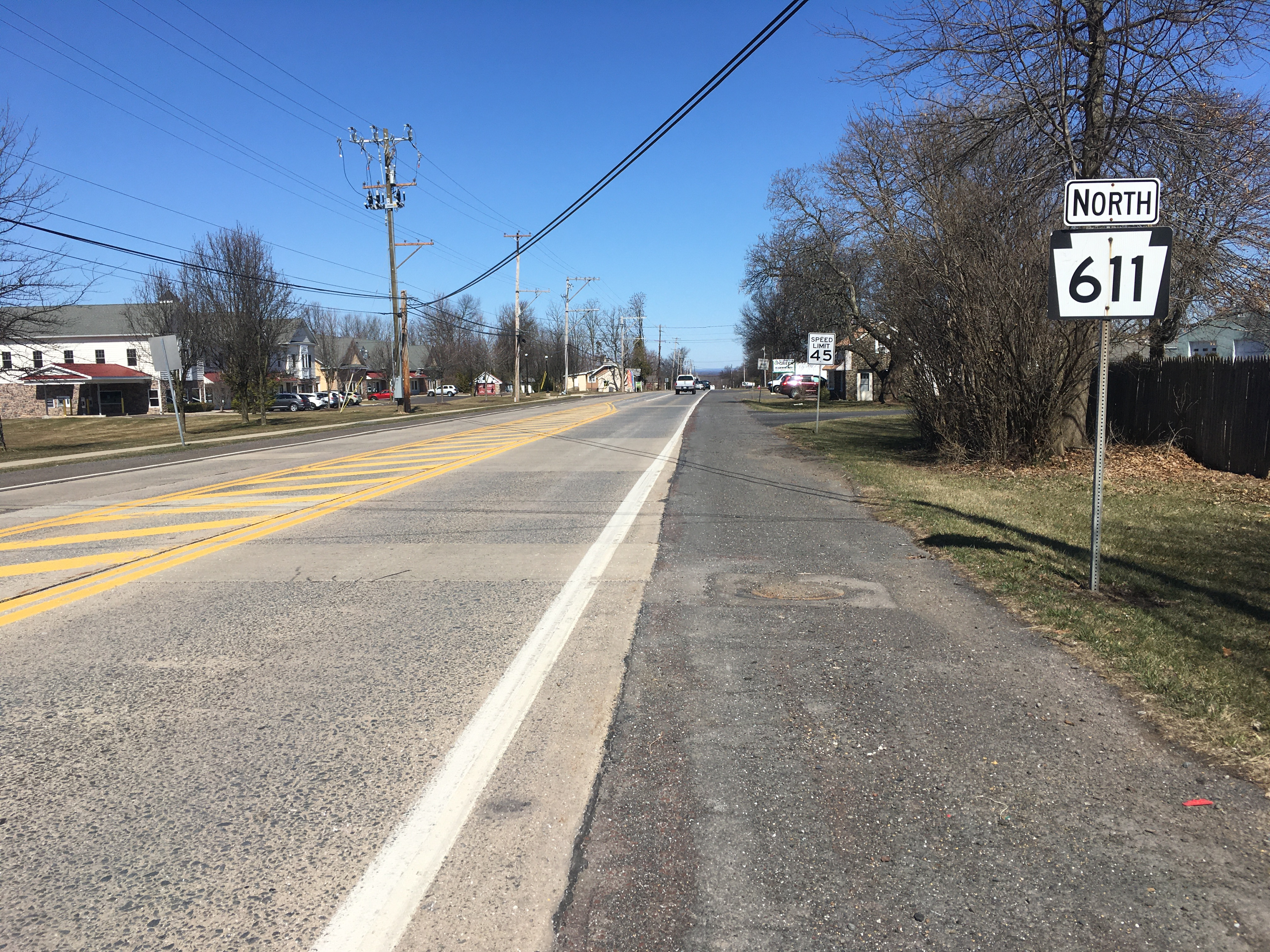
PA 611 northbound in Plumsteadville

PA 611 continues north-northwest on four-lane divided North Easton Road, passing under Ferry Road. The route turns into a four-lane road with two northbound lanes, one southbound lane, and a center left-turn lane before it comes to an intersection with Silo Hill Road that has a northbound jughandle. PA 611 narrows to a three-lane road with a center left-turn lane and runs through a mix of farm fields and woodland with some residential and commercial development, crossing the North Branch Neshaminy Creek. The road curves north and turns into a three-lane road with two northbound lanes and one southbound lane, with the name changing to Easton Road. PA 611 reaches Plumsteadville, where it becomes a three-lane road with a center turn lane and passes a mix of homes and businesses, crossing Stump Road. North of here, the route narrows to two lanes and passes some industrial development before heading into a mix of farms and woods with some homes and businesses and entering Bedminster Township. The road crosses Cabin Run and bends to the north-northeast as it continues through rural areas with some development, coming to an intersection with the northern terminus of PA 413 in Pipersville. PA 611 heads through wooded areas with some fields and homes, crossing Deep Run and curving to the northwest.

The route crosses Tohickon Creek into Tinicum Township and heads north to an intersection with the northern end of PA 113. Past this junction, the road runs north-northwest through a mix of farmland and woodland with some homes and businesses, passing to the west of Ottsville as it crosses over Creamery Road on a bridge. PA 611 enters Nockamixon Township and continues through rural land with scattered development. The road comes to an intersection with the southern terminus of PA 412 in Harrow; PA 412 provides access to Nockamixon State Park. From here, the route bends north and runs through wooded areas with some fields and development, curving northeast. PA 611 comes to Revere and makes a turn to the northwest.

The road then runs through forested areas with a few homes and businesses, passing through Ferndale, and winding north through more woodland with some development, with Gallows Run parallel to the west and then comes to Kintnersville, where it reaches a junction with the northern terminus of PA 32 and crosses Gallows Run. From here, PA 611 enters Durham Township and heads northwest through wooded areas as it begins to follow the Delaware Canal and the west bank of the Delaware River. The road continues along the canal and the river, crossing Rodges Run, and curves north to come to an intersection with the eastern terminus of PA 212 in Durham Furnace. Past this junction, the route crosses Cooks Creek and runs northeast through more rural land before entering the borough of Riegelsville. In Riegelsville, the road heads north-northwest past homes and a few businesses and intersects Delaware Road, which leads east to the Riegelsville Bridge over the Delaware River.

=== Northampton County ===
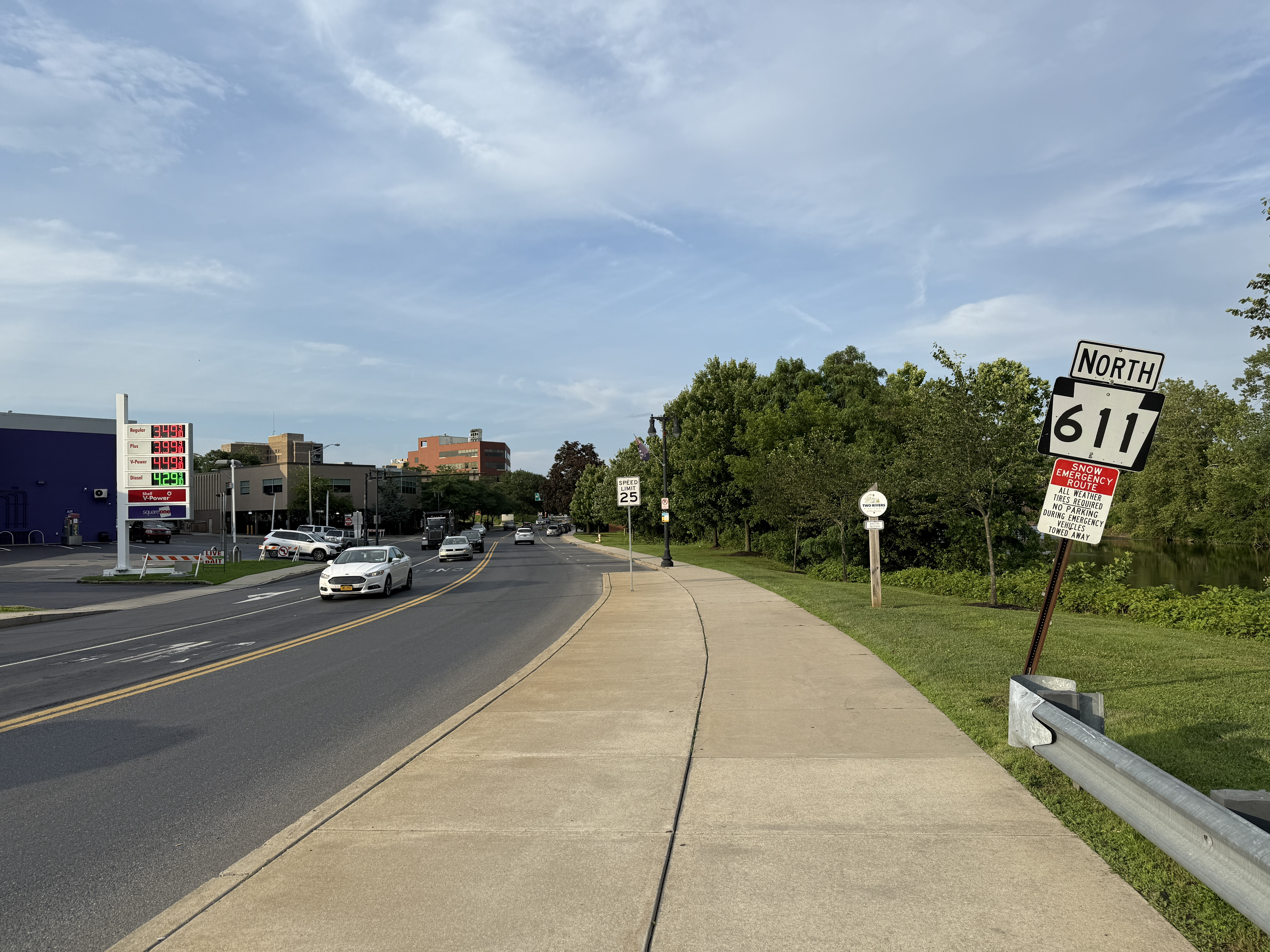
PA 611 northbound on Larry Holmes Drive in Easton

PA 611 leaves Riegelsville for Williams Township in Northampton County, which is in the Lehigh Valley region, and becomes South Delaware Drive, heading north-northwest through forested areas immediately to the west of the Delaware Canal and the Delaware River. The road bends east and runs through a mix of woods, fields, and homes, curving to the north again. The route passes through Raubsville and continues north-northwest through wooded areas with sparse development alongside the canal and river, curving northeast. PA 611 passes under the Interstate 78 Toll Bridge that carries I-78 over the Delaware River before PA 611, the canal, and the river make a sharp turn to the west. The road heads into the city of Easton and intersects Cedarville Road, which heads south and west to provide access to I-78. The route continues northwest through wooded areas alongside the Delaware Canal and Delaware River, with nearby residential development to the west.

PA 611 crosses under Norfolk Southern's Lehigh Line and Portland Secondary railroad line before turning southwest along the south bank of the Lehigh River, passing under an abandoned railroad line. The route turns northwest onto four-lane South 3rd Street and crosses the Lehigh River, with the abandoned railroad tracks passing over the bridge carrying the route over the river. On the north bank, PA 611 turns northeast onto two-lane undivided Larry Holmes Drive, which is named for former heavyweight boxing champion Larry Holmes, and passes through commercial areas to the east of downtown Easton, running along the north bank of the Lehigh River before curving north and following the west bank of the Delaware River.

The road intersects Northampton Street just west of the Northampton Street Bridge over the river before it comes to an intersection with the eastern terminus of PA 248. At this point, the route turns east onto North Delaware Drive and bends north as it comes to a partial interchange with the US 22 freeway just west of the Easton–Phillipsburg Toll Bridge, with access to eastbound US 22 and from westbound US 22; PA 248 provides the missing movements. Past this, the road crosses Bushkill Creek and continues north-northeast through wooded areas along the west bank of the Delaware River, with nearby development to the west.

PA 611 leaves Easton for Forks Township and runs through forested areas with some homes alongside the river, curving to the north. The road continues through rural areas parallel to the Delaware River, turning to the northwest and then to the northeast. The route enters Lower Mount Bethel Township and through Sandts Eddy. PA 611 curves north and runs through wooded areas with some homes and businesses, crossing a Norfolk Southern railroad spur.

The road turns northwest away from the Delaware River and runs to the southwest of Norfolk Southern's Portland Secondary, heading into Martins Creek. Here, the route turns east at an intersection with Front Street and Main Street to remain along North Delaware Drive, passing over the Norfolk Southern line and Martins Creek. PA 611 runs through woods before heading through farm fields and making a turn to the north.

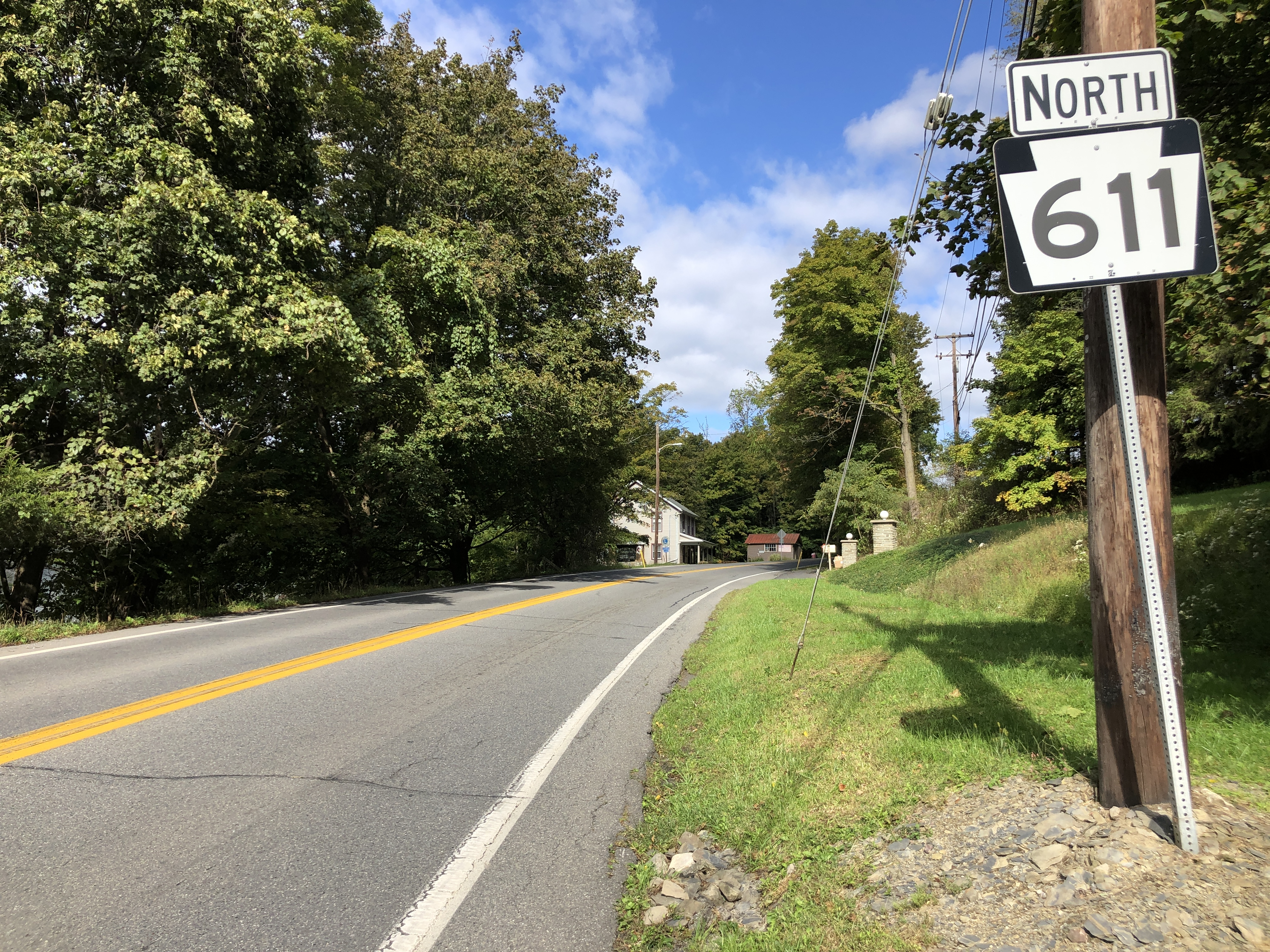
PA 611 northbound in Washington Township

The road heads northeast through farmland with some woods and homes, passing through Mount Pleasant. Farther along, the route cuts through a corner of Washington Township and runs through Richmond. PA 611 enters Upper Mount Bethel Township and heads through a mix of farm fields and woods with some homes, passing through Centerville. The road continues north through rural land and comes to an intersection with the northern terminus of PA 512 before it heads northeast through Mount Bethel. The route runs through wooded areas with some homes and businesses and passes under Norfolk Southern's Portland Secondary, at which point it enters the borough of Portland.

PA 611 widens to a four-lane divided highway and splits from the road at a partial cloverleaf interchange to head northwest on Delaware Avenue, with the divided highway leading to the Portland–Columbia Toll Bridge over the Delaware River to New Jersey, where the road becomes Route 94 and provides access to I-80 and the western terminus of US 46. From here, PA 611 follows two-lane undivided Delaware Avenue through downtown Portland before heading into wooded areas with homes to the southwest and Norfolk Southern's Stroudsburg Secondary railroad line and the Delaware River to the northeast. The road gains a second northbound lane and leaves Portland for Upper Mount Bethel Township, heading into forested areas and passing to the west of Slateford. The route crosses into the Delaware Water Gap National Recreation Area and narrows to two lanes, passing to the east of the eastern extent of Blue Mountain at Mount Minsi and to the west of a Delaware-Lackawanna Railroad line and the Delaware River as it traverses the Delaware Water Gap. Along this stretch, the road passes the Arrow Island Overlook.

=== Monroe County ===
PA 611 southbound in Delaware Water Gap

While traversing the Delaware Water Gap, PA 611 enters the borough of Delaware Water Gap in Monroe County and heads into the Pocono Mountains region of Pennsylvania. After passing the Point of Gap Overlook, the road curves west and the northwest along with the railroad tracks and the river through more dense forests. The route passes to the west of the Delaware Water Gap Toll Bridge carrying I-80 over the Delaware River at the Resort Point Overlook and bends northwest away from the river. The road leaves the recreation area, crosses the Appalachian Trail, and heads past homes and a few businesses as Main Street. PA 611 runs past businesses and turns southwest onto Foxtown Hill Road, with that road heading northeast to provide access to I-80. Past this intersection, the road passes north of the Martz Bus Terminal and a commuter parking lot serving Delaware Water Gap. The route becomes a three-lane road with two northbound lanes and one southbound lane that ascends a hill, running past homes before entering Smithfield Township and heading into forests. The road curves west and narrows to two lanes, entering Stroud Township, before it turns northwest and becomes three lanes with one northbound lane and two southbound lanes as it descends the hill.

PA 611 passes through Foxtown and enters the borough of Stroudsburg, curving west and coming to an intersection with PA 191. Here, the route becomes two-lane Park Avenue and turns north through residential areas, reaching a partial interchange with I-80/US 209 with access to and from the eastbound lanes of I-80/US 209; access to and from the westbound lanes is provided by PA 191. Past this interchange, the road becomes South 7th Street and crosses McMichael Creek before it heads into the commercial downtown of Stroudsburg, where it comes to an intersection with US 209 Bus. Here, PA 611 turns west for a wrong-way concurrency with US 209 Bus. on Main Street, passing through more of the downtown. Main Street has two southbound lanes and one northbound lane. PA 611 splits from US 209 Bus. by turning north onto two-lane North 9th Street, heading past homes and businesses and curving to the northwest.

The route leaves Stroudsburg for Stroud Township and runs west through commercial areas with some homes, passing through Arlington Heights. The road gains a center left-turn lane and passes more businesses, heading to the south of the Stroud Mall. PA 611 comes to a partial interchange providing access from northbound PA 611 to westbound I-80 and from eastbound I-80 to southbound PA 611 and turns to the northwest. The route continues through a mix of residential and commercial development and woods parallel to I-80. Farther west, the road passes north of St. Luke's Hospital–Monroe Campus and widens to five lanes, coming to an at-grade intersection with the northern terminus of the PA 33 freeway, which provides access to I-80 immediately to the south.

Past this junction, PA 611 narrows to an unnamed three-lane road with a center turn lane and heads northwest, passing through a corner of Hamilton Township before it crosses into Pocono Township and runs through Bartonsville. The route continues northwest through wooded areas and development, crossing Pocono Creek twice and passing through Lower Tannersville. In Tannersville, PA 611 forms a short wrong-way concurrency with PA 715. The road passes to the east of the Pocono Premium Outlets and runs through wooded areas before it comes to a partial interchange with I-80, with access from westbound I-80 to both directions of PA 611 and from southbound PA 611 to eastbound I-80.

PA 611 southbound past PA 940 in Mount Pocono

The route continues north through forests with some residential and commercial development, intersecting Great Wolf Drive, which leads west to the Great Wolf Lodge resort, and curving northwest in Scotrun. The highway runs north through wooded areas with some businesses. The route passes to the west of a Sanofi Pasteur plant before it comes to a junction with PA 314 in Swiftwater, where it turns into a four-lane divided highway.

PA 611 then curves northwest and forms a brief concurrency with PA 314 before that route splits to the west. PA 611 crosses into Paradise Township and reaches Wiscasset, where it intersects Woodland Road, which leads northeast to the Mount Airy Casino Resort. The road continues through forests with some development and enters the borough of Mount Pocono. The route becomes Pocono Boulevard and passes under a Delaware-Lackawanna Railroad line before it heads east of the Martz Express bus station serving Mount Pocono and the former Mount Pocono station, continuing north as a two-lane undivided road through residential areas with a few businesses. PA 611 heads into a commercial area and comes to an intersection with PA 940, with that route turning north for a short concurrency before it splits west at an intersection that also serves as the southern terminus of PA 196. From here, PA 611 becomes a three-lane road with a center left-turn lane and runs past businesses before it transitions to a three-lane road with two northbound lanes and one southbound lane, heading into forests and crossing into Coolbaugh Township, where the name changes to Memorial Boulevard.

The road becomes three lanes with a center turn lane again and passes to the northeast of Pocono Mountains Regional Airport before running near some commercial development. The route continues through forested areas with some homes and businesses, reaching a bridge over the Delaware-Lackawanna Railroad line and becoming a four-lane undivided road. Farther northwest, the road crosses Tobyhanna Creek and comes to an intersection with PA 423 southwest of Tobyhanna, with that route providing access to southbound I-380 and from northbound I-380. PA 611 continues northwest through forests as a three-lane road with one northbound lane and two southbound lanes and reaches its northern terminus at a partial interchange with I-380, with access to northbound I-380 and from southbound I-380.

== History ==
U.S. Route 611
- Location: Philadelphia–Scranton
- Existed: 1926–1972

What is now PA 611 between Philadelphia and Willow Grove was originally built as part of the Old York Road, a road established in the 18th century to connect Philadelphia to New York City. This portion of the road was planned in 1711 to run from Philadelphia to Centre Bridge. The Old York Road would later exist as a turnpike. In 1811, the Philadelphia and Great Bend Turnpike, a private turnpike, was chartered to run between Philadelphia and Great Bend. This turnpike was built to attract settlers to rural Pennsylvania. The section through Covington Township was built as a plank road between 1819 and 1826 by John Delong under the employment of Henry Drinker. The Philadelphia and Great Bend Turnpike, which was also known as the Drinker Turnpike, was built from 1826 to 1828.

In 1823, the Willow Grove and Doylestown Turnpike Company was chartered to build a turnpike between Willow Grove and Doylestown. The turnpike between Willow Grove and Doylestown was completed in the 1830s. The Easton Road between Doylestown and Plumsteadville was improved into a turnpike in the 1840s.

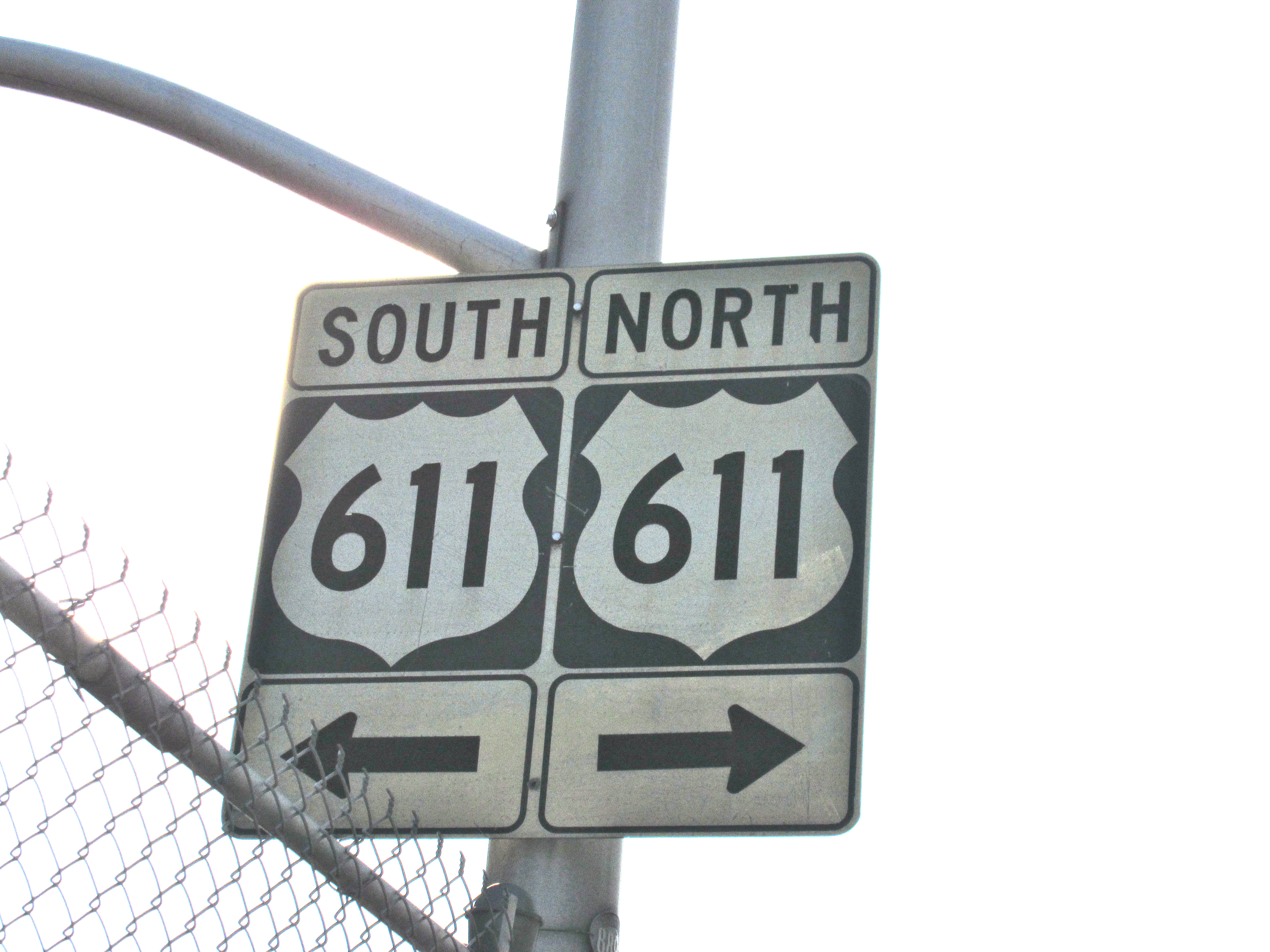
US 611 sign at the intersection of Cheltenham Avenue and PA 611 (Old York Road) on the border of Philadelphia and Cheltenham Township in 2014; the sign has since been removed.

Following the passage of the Sproul Road Bill in 1911, the route between Philadelphia and Scranton was designated as Legislative Route 151 between Philadelphia and Doylestown, Legislative Route 156 between Doylestown and Easton, Legislative Route 165 between Easton and Bangor, Legislative Route 166 between Bangor and Stroudsburg, and Legislative Route 168 between Stroudsburg and Scranton. In 1921, the Lackawanna Trail was built as a paved auto trail running from Easton north through Stroudsburg to Scranton and the New York border.

After being constructed, the trail was one of the best paved roads in the eastern part of the United States. The road between Philadelphia and Scranton was designated by the state in 1924 as part of the Lackawanna Trail, which continued north past Scranton to the New York state line in Great Bend. The Lackawanna Trail was numbered as PA 2. With the creation of the U.S. Highway System in 1926, US 611 was designated concurrent with PA 2 along the Lackawanna Trail between Philadelphia City Hall in Philadelphia and parent route US 11 in Scranton.

The entire length of US 611 was paved by 1926.

Pennsylvania Route 302
- Location: Stroudsburg
- Existed: 1928–1930

Pennsylvania Route 827
- Location: Martins Creek
- Existed: 1928–1930s

In 1928, the concurrent PA 2 designation was removed from US 611. The same year, PA 191 was designated onto Broad Street in Philadelphia between Moyamensing Avenue and Philadelphia City Hall. In 1928, PA 827 was designated onto the portion of Delaware Drive between US 611 in Martins Creek and Martins Creek Belvidere Highway; this road was paved. In addition, the section of Delaware Drive between east of Martins Creek and Mount Bethel was an unnumbered paved road. In 1928, PA 612 was designated onto unpaved Foxtown Hill Road between US 611 in Delaware Water Gap and south of Stroudsburg while PA 302 was designated onto paved Park Avenue between PA 612 and US 611 in Stroudsburg. By 1930, the portion of PA 612 along Foxtown Hill Road was paved while the PA 302 designation was removed. The northern end of US 611 was routed by 1930 to follow Drinker Street and Blakely Street in Dunmore to end at US 11 at Green Ridge Street, with US 11 having replaced US 611 along Green Ridge Street to Main Avenue in Scranton.

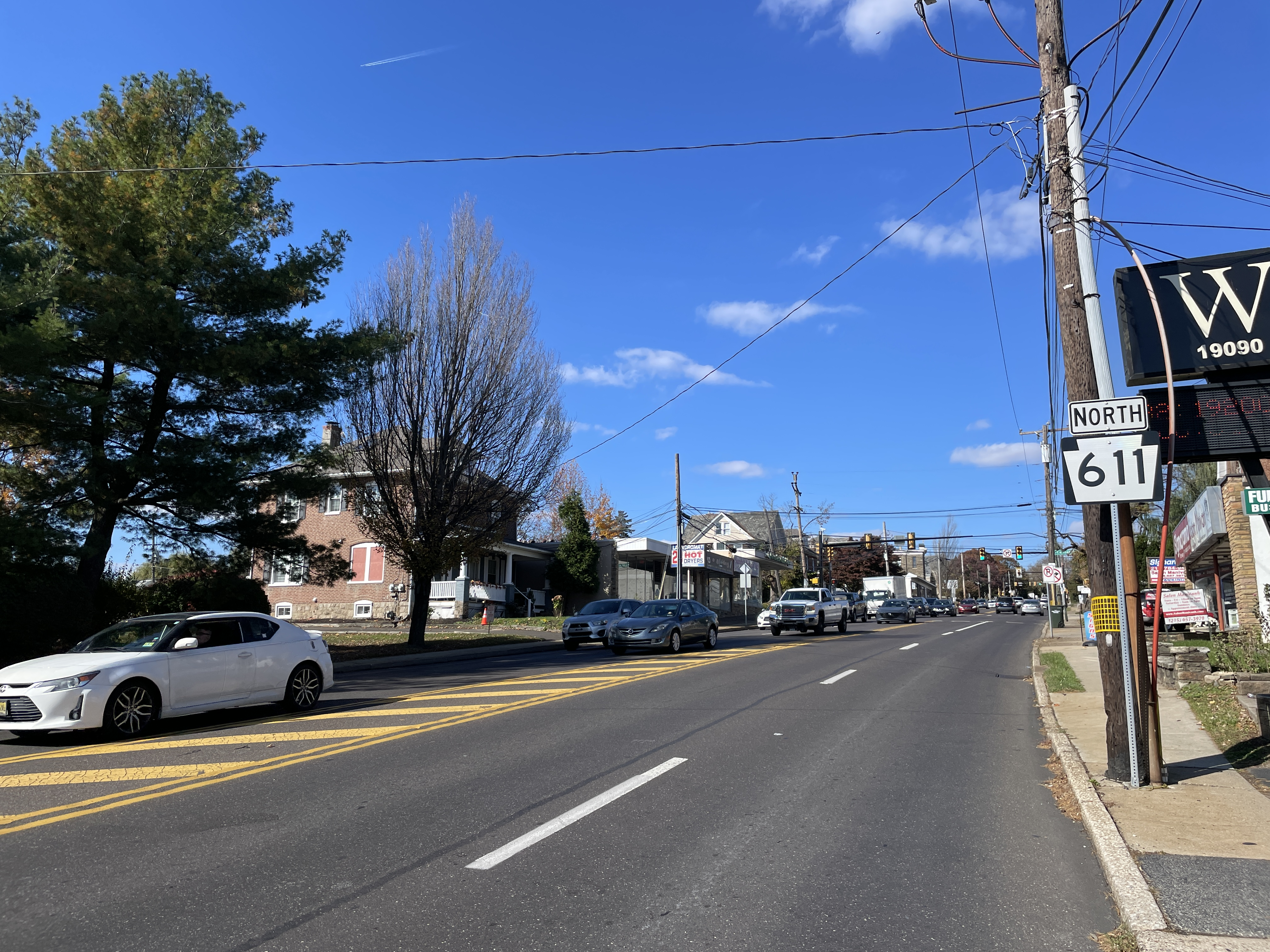
PA 611 northbound in Willow Grove

In the 1930s, US 611 was realigned to follow Delaware Drive between Martins Creek and Portland, replacing the entire length of PA 827. The former alignment of the route between Martins Creek and Mount Bethel via Bangor was designated as PA 712; this road is now unnumbered Main Street and Lower South Main Street between Martins Creek and Bangor and PA 512 between Bangor and Mount Bethel. US 611 and PA 612 switched alignments between Delaware Water Gap and Stroudsburg in the 1930s, with US 611 realigned to follow Foxtown Hill Road and Park Avenue between Delaware Water Gap and Stroudsburg and PA 612 designated to follow the former alignment of US 611 between Delaware Water Gap and Stroudsburg via East Stroudsburg along Broad Street, Brown Street, Prospect Street, Ridgeway Street, Bridge Street, and Main Street. By 1940, US 611 was extended north along US 11 to follow Green Ridge Street, Main Avenue, and Market Street to end at US 6 at Keyser Avenue in Scranton. In the 1930s, US 611 was widened into a multilane road across the Neshaminy Creek, between south of Doylestown and Plumsteadville, between US 46 in Portland and Slateford, between Delaware Water Gap and south of Stroudsburg, from a point north of the PA 507 intersection north to the newly-constructed PA 307 in southern Lackawanna County, and between south of Dunmore and Scranton. During the 1940s, US 611 was upgraded to a multilane road between Philadelphia and south of Doylestown, between south of Stroudsburg and north of the PA 507 intersection, and along a short stretch to the north of PA 348 in Lackawanna County. By 1950, US 611 was realigned to bypass Pipersville to the west, with the former alignment becoming Old Easton Road.

The route was also shifted west to a new alignment between north of PA 113 and north of Ottsville, with the former alignment becoming Durham Road. US 611 was extended further north along US 11 to end at US 6 at the northern edge of Scranton in the 1950s. In the 1950s, PA 291 replaced the PA 191 designation along Broad Street between Moyamensing Avenue and US 611 at Philadelphia City Hall. In the 1950s, US 611 was upgraded to a divided highway between Philadelphia and PA 63 in Willow Grove, between Scotrun and PA 196 in Mount Pocono, and along a short stretch south of PA 490 (now PA 423) in Tobyhanna. The section of US 611 between PA 590 in Elmhurst and Dunmore was improved to a divided highway in 1958, with the section of the route leading into Dunmore moved to a new alignment.

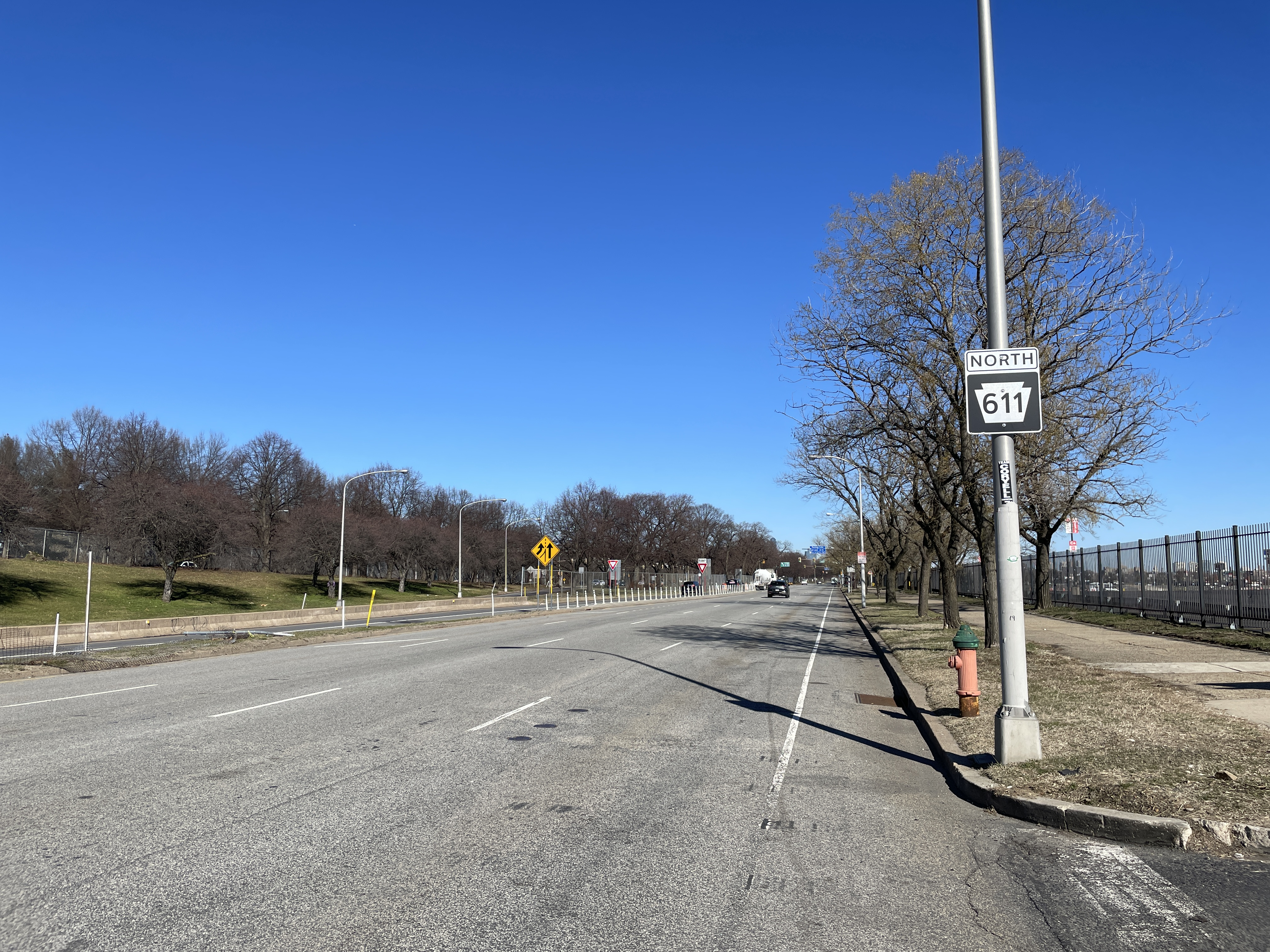
PA 611 northbound past its southern terminus at I-95 in South Philadelphia

In 1953, US 611 was realigned between Portland and Delaware Water Gap to cross the Delaware River on the Portland–Columbia Toll Bridge into New Jersey, where it continued along a new multilane road on the east bank of the Delaware River before crossing back into Pennsylvania on the Delaware Water Gap Toll Bridge. The former alignment of the route in Pennsylvania between Portland and Delaware Water Gap was designated as US 611 Alt. By 1960, the alignment of US 611 across the Delaware Water Gap Toll Bridge became part of I-80.

On December 1, 1962, the American Association of State Highway Officials (AASHO) approved realigning US 611 to follow I-80 between the northern terminus of US 611 Alt. in Delaware Water Gap and Scotrun. In 1963, the Pennsylvania Department of Highways (PDH) recommended replacing US 611 Alt. with US 611, with the US 611 designation to be removed from I-80. On December 5, 1964, approval was given by AASHO to realign US 611 to follow the alignment of US 611 Alt. between Portland and Stroudsburg and the former surface alignment between Stroudsburg and Scotrun instead of following I-80 and crossing the Delaware River twice to run through New Jersey. Signs reflecting the realignment were to be changed by April 1, 1965. US 611 was upgraded to a divided highway between County Line Road north of Horsham and Doylestown in the 1960s. The section of US 611 between Tobyhanna and Gouldsboro was upgraded to a freeway and became part of I-81E (now I-380) in the 1960s.

On December 5, 1964, AASHO approved eliminating the section of US 611 between I-81 in Dunmore and US 6/US 11 in Scranton, cutting back the northern terminus of US 611 to the interchange with I-81 in Dunmore. US 611 was rerouted to follow a section of the I-81E freeway in Dunmore to end at I-81.

On December 3, 1971, AASHO approved the elimination of the US 611 designation. On March 14, 1972, US 611 was decommissioned and replaced with PA 611 between Philadelphia and I-81E in Tobyhanna and PA 435 between I-81E in Gouldsboro and I-81E in Dunmore. Signs were changed by April of that year.

The southern terminus of PA 611 was located at PA 3 and PA 291 at Philadelphia City Hall. By 1989, PA 611 was extended south along Broad Street from Philadelphia City Hall to I-95 in South Philadelphia, replacing PA 291 between Moyamensing Avenue and Philadelphia City Hall. In the 1970s, PA 611 was realigned to follow Larry Holmes Drive through downtown Easton, having previously followed 3rd Street, a one-way pair along 3rd Street and Ferry Street northbound and 2nd Street southbound, Ferry Street, and Front Street.

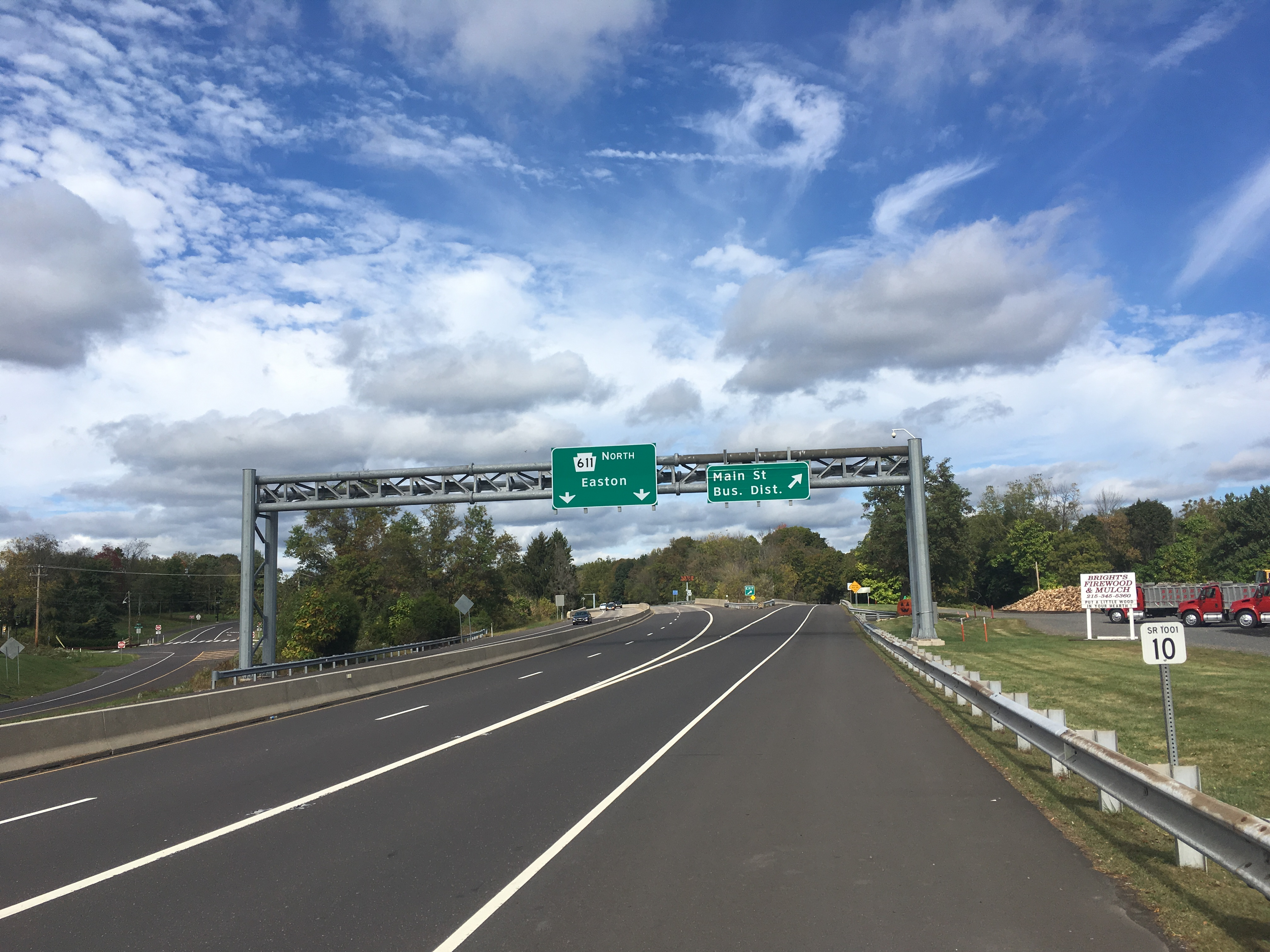
PA 611 northbound at the Main Street interchange along the Doylestown Bypass in Doylestown Township

In the 1950s and 1960s, plans were made for a freeway along the US 611 corridor between Philadelphia and Easton. The proposal called for extending the freeway section of PA 63 (Woodhaven Road) from Northeast Philadelphia northwest to an interchange with the Pennsylvania Turnpike (I-276) in Southampton. From here, the freeway would become the Cross County Expressway and parallel US 611, utilizing the present-day Doylestown Bypass and continuing north to the south end of the PA 33 freeway near Easton. Most of this proposed freeway was not built.

In 1970, the state awarded contracts to build a bypass for US 611 around Doylestown. The freeway bypass for PA 611 around Doylestown opened in 1976, removing the route from its former alignment that ran through Doylestown on Main Street. By 1989, PA 611 was upgraded to a divided highway between the Pennsylvania Turnpike (I-276) interchange in Willow Grove and PA 463 in Horsham.

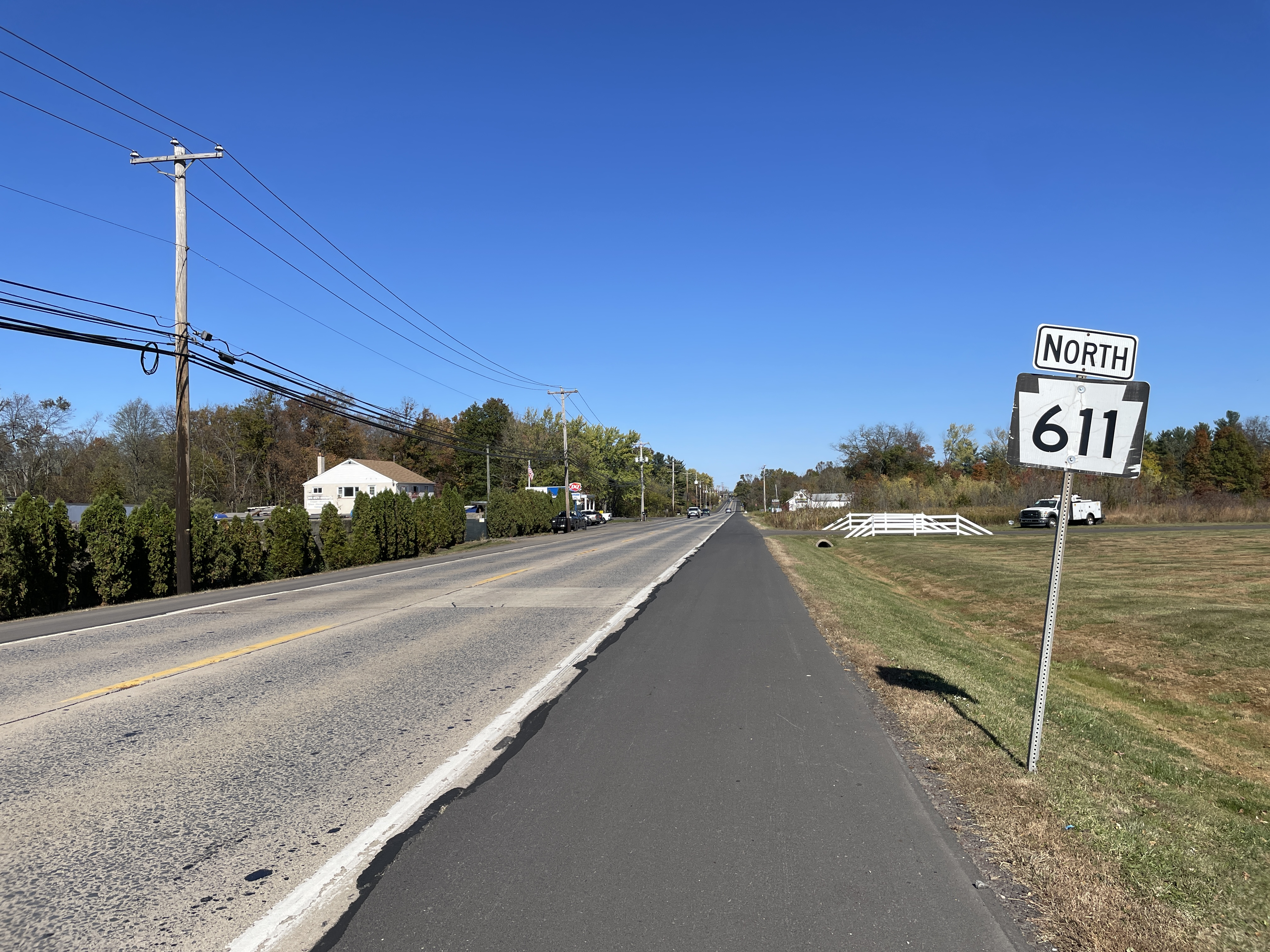
PA 611 northbound in Bedminster Township

In September 2021, the remnants of Hurricane Ida damaged an arch culvert along PA 611 in Williams Township, resulting in the closure of this portion of road. The road reopened to traffic on March 4, 2022, after repairs were made. In April 2022, heavy rains washed out a slope and retaining wall along a portion of PA 611 in the Delaware Water Gap National Recreation Area, resulting in the route being closed indefinitely between Portland and Delaware Water Gap until repairs could be completed. This section of road reopened to traffic in May 2022. On December 6, 2022, heavy rains caused a rockslide along PA 611 between Portland and Delaware Water Gap, resulting in the closure of this stretch of road indefinitely. The closure of this stretch of PA 611 impacted businesses in Delaware Water Gap, with some forced to close. The Pennsylvania Department of Transportation (PennDOT) plans to repair the road by removing loose rock from the side of Mount Minsi, after which a single lane would be reopened and long-term stabilization of the slope will begin. After the stabilization of the slope, the road will fully be reopened to traffic. Repairs were delayed until the National Park Service granted PennDOT a permit to remove rock. Construction to repair this section of road began on August 14, 2024. A single lane controlled by traffic signals reopened on November 5, 2024.

== Major intersections ==
County	Location	mi	km	Destinations	Notes
Philadelphia	Philadelphia	0.000	0.000	Broad Street south – The Navy Yard	Continuation south
Philadelphia	Philadelphia	0.000	0.000	I-95 to I-76 east – Central Philadelphia, International Airport	Exit 17 on I-95
Philadelphia	Philadelphia	0.936	1.506	I-76 – Valley Forge, Walt Whitman Bridge, New Jersey	Exit 349 on I-76
Philadelphia	Philadelphia	1.292	2.079	PA 291 west	Southbound access only; PA 291 not signed; eastern terminus of PA 291
Philadelphia	Philadelphia	3.933	6.330	PA 3 west (West John F. Kennedy Boulevard) to I-676	Eastern terminus of PA 3; Penn Square
Philadelphia	Philadelphia	4.245	6.832	I-676 / US 30	Access via Vine Street; US 30 not signed
Philadelphia	Philadelphia	8.464	13.621	US 13 (West Roosevelt Boulevard)	No left turns
Philadelphia	Philadelphia	8.578	13.805	US 1 south (Roosevelt Expressway)	Interchange; northbound exit and southbound entrance; access via Cayuga Street
Philadelphia–Montgomery county line	Philadelphia–Cheltenham Township line	11.582	18.639	PA 309 north / Cheltenham Avenue	Interchange; southern terminus of PA 309
Montgomery	Cheltenham–Abington township line	13.494	21.716	PA 73 (Township Line Road) – Whitemarsh, Cheltenham	
Montgomery	Abington–Upper Moreland township line	17.216	27.706	PA 63 (Moreland Road)	
Montgomery	Upper Moreland Township	17.716	28.511	PA 263 north	No access from PA 611 south to PA 263 north; southern terminus of PA 263
Montgomery	Upper Moreland Township	19.205	30.907	I-276 / Penna Turnpike – Philadelphia, Harrisburg	Exit 343 (Willow Grove) on I-276 / Penna Turnpike
Montgomery	Horsham Township	20.285	32.646	PA 463 west (Horsham Road)	No access from PA 463 east to PA 611 north; eastern terminus of PA 463
Bucks	Warrington Township	23.833	38.355	PA 132 east (Street Road) – Warminster	Western terminus of PA 132
Bucks	Doylestown Township	27.813	44.761	Southern end of freeway section	
Bucks	Doylestown Township	27.813	44.761	Main Street – Business District	Northbound exit and southbound entrance
Bucks	Doylestown Township	28.646– 28.665	46.101– 46.132	US 202 – New Hope, Norristown	
Bucks	Doylestown Township	29.527	47.519	US 202 Bus. south (State Street)	Northern terminus of US 202 Bus.; access to Delaware Valley University
Bucks	Doylestown Township	30.882	49.700	Broad Street	
Bucks	Doylestown–Plumstead township line	31.697	51.011	PA 313 – Dublin	Northbound exit and southbound entrance; access to Shrine of Czestochowa
Bucks	Plumstead Township	32.999	53.107	Main Street	Southbound exit and northbound entrance; to PA 313
Bucks	Plumstead Township	32.999	53.107	Northern end of freeway section	
Bucks	Bedminster Township	38.261	61.575	PA 413 south (Deep Run Road) – Pipersville	Northern terminus of PA 413
Bucks	Tinicum Township	40.156	64.625	PA 113 south (Bedminster Road)	Northern terminus of PA 113
Bucks	Nockamixon Township	43.684	70.303	PA 412 north (Durham Road) – Springtown	Southern terminus of PA 412
Bucks	Nockamixon Township	48.879	78.663	PA 32 south – Upper Black Eddy	Northern terminus of PA 32
Bucks	Durham Township	50.658	81.526	PA 212 west – Springtown	Eastern terminus of PA 212
Northampton	Easton	59.306	95.444	Cedarville Road to I-78	Exit 75 on I-78
Northampton	Easton	60.906	98.019	PA 248 west (Larry Holmes Drive) to US 22 west – Wind Gap, Allentown	Eastern terminus of PA 248
Northampton	Easton	60.995	98.162	US 22 east – New Jersey, New York	Interchange; access to US 22 east and from US 22 west
Northampton	Upper Mount Bethel Township	77.967	125.476	PA 512 south (Mount Bethel Highway) – Bangor	Northern terminus of PA 512
Northampton	Portland	79.603	128.109	To I-80 / US 46 east / Route 94 north – New Jersey, New York	Interchange; access via Portland–Columbia Toll Bridge
Monroe	Smithfield Township	86.200	138.725	Foxtown Hill Road to I-80 – New Jersey	Exit 310 on I-80
Monroe	Stroudsburg	88.534	142.482	PA 191 to I-80 west – Bangor, Analomink	
Monroe	Stroudsburg	88.932	143.122	I-80 east / US 209 north – Delaware Water Gap	Access to and from I-80 east/US 209 north; exit 307 on I-80/US 209
Monroe	Stroudsburg	89.156	143.483	US 209 Bus. north (Main Street)	South end of US 209 Bus. overlap
Monroe	Stroudsburg	89.337	143.774	US 209 Bus. south (Main Street)	North end of US 209 Bus. overlap
Monroe	Stroud Township	91.153	146.697	I-80 west – Hazleton	Northbound exit to I-80 west and southbound entrance from I-80 east; exit 303 on I-80
Monroe	Stroud Township	93.525	150.514	I-80 / PA 33 south to US 209 south – Allentown, Stroudsburg, Snydersville, Hazleton	Exit 302 on I-80; northern terminus of PA 33
Monroe	Pocono Township	97.367	156.697	PA 715 north – Henryville	South end of PA 715 overlap
Monroe	Pocono Township	97.435	156.806	PA 715 south to I-80 – Reeders	North end of PA 715 overlap
Monroe	Pocono Township	98.367	158.306	I-80 east – Stroudsburg	Southbound exit to I-80 east and full-access entrance from I-80 west; exit 298 on I-80
Monroe	Pocono Township	101.216	162.891	PA 314 east – Henryville, Cresco	South end of PA 314 overlap
Monroe	Pocono Township	101.436	163.245	PA 314 west – Pocono Manor, Pocono Summit	North end of PA 314 overlap
Monroe	Mount Pocono	103.960	167.307	PA 940 east – East Stroudsburg	South end of PA 940 overlap
Monroe	Mount Pocono	104.024	167.410	PA 196 north / PA 940 west to I-380 – Hamlin, Blakeslee	North end of PA 940 overlap; southern terminus of PA 196
Monroe	Coolbaugh Township	108.918	175.287	PA 423 to I-380 south – Pocono Pines, Tobyhanna, South Sterling	
Monroe	Coolbaugh Township	109.685	176.521	I-380 north – Scranton	Northern terminus; exit 8 on I-380
1.000 mi = 1.609 km; 1.000 km = 0.621 mi: Concurrency terminus; Electronic toll collection; Incomplete access

== Special routes ==
=== Bucks County truck route ===
Pennsylvania Route 611 Truck
- Location: Bedminster Township
- Length: 0.4 mi (640 m)

Pennsylvania Route 611 Truck (PA 611 Truck) signs are posted to direct trucks from northbound PA 413 directly to PA 611 in Bedminster Township in Bucks County, avoiding Old Easton Road. The route is concurrent with the northernmost portion of PA 413 and is signed only as "To Truck Route PA 611" in the northbound direction of PA 413 only.

=== Northampton County truck route ===
Pennsylvania Route 611 Truck
- Location: Easton
- Length: 2.9 mi (4.7 km)

Pennsylvania Route 611 Truck is a mostly unsigned truck route marked by a green arrow bypassing a low clearance bridge carrying the Lehigh Valley Railroad on which trucks over 12 feet 3 inches are prohibited. The route follows Smith Avenue, Saint John Street, Philadelphia Road, Morgan Hill Road, and Cedarville Road through the south part of Easton, Pennsylvania.

=== Former Monroe County truck route ===
Pennsylvania Route 611 Truck
- Location: Bartonsville–Tannersville
- Length: 5.0 mi (8.0 km)
- Existed: 2013–2015

Pennsylvania Route 611 Truck (PA 611 Truck) was a truck route of PA 611 that bypassed the stretch of the route between Bartonsville and Tannersville in Monroe County from 2013 to 2015. PA 611 Truck northbound started at the intersection of PA 33 and PA 611. When PA 33 interchanges with I-80, the truck route headed onto I-80 west. In Tannersville, it reached an interchange with PA 715 at exit 299 and a mile later, PA 611 Truck left I-80 at exit 298 to PA 611, coming to its northern terminus. PA 611 Truck southbound started at PA 611 and merged onto I-80 east at exit 298. It had an interchange with PA 715 at exit 299 and 3 miles later, exited I-80 onto PA 33 north. PA 611 Truck reached its southern terminus 0.13 miles (0.21 km) later at PA 611. However, the truck route was decommissioned in 2015.

=== Former Philadelphia alternate route ===
U.S. Route 611 Alternate
- Location: Philadelphia–Willow Grove
- Existed: 1946–1950s

U.S. Route 611 Alternate (US 611 Alt.) was an alternate route of US 611 between Philadelphia and Willow Grove. The route began at US 309, US 422, and US 309 Truck at the intersection of Germantown Avenue, Chew Avenue, and Mt. Airy Avenue in Philadelphia, heading northeast on Mt. Airy Avenue. The route became Easton Road as it entered Montgomery County at the Cheltenham Avenue intersection. A short distance after this, the alternate route formed a short concurrency with PA 152 near that route's intersection with PA 73.

US 611 Alt. continued northeast through Glenside and Roslyn before it reached Willow Grove, where it crossed PA 63 before ending at US 611 a short distance south of the southern terminus of PA 263. US 611 Alt. was first designated by 1946. The alternate route was decommissioned in the 1950s.

Major intersections

County	Location	mi	km	Destinations	Notes
Philadelphia	Philadelphia			US 309 south (Allens Lane) US 309 north / US 422 west / US 309 Truck south (Germantown Avenue) US 422 east (Chew Street)	Southern terminus
Montgomery	Cheltenham Township			PA 152 south (Limekiln Pike)	South end of PA 152 overlap
Montgomery	Cheltenham Township			PA 152 north (Limekiln Pike) to PA 73	North end of PA 152 overlap
Montgomery	Abington–Upper Moreland township line			PA 63 (Moreland Road)	
Montgomery	Upper Moreland Township			US 611 (Easton Road/Old York Road)	Northern terminus
1.000 mi = 1.609 km; 1.000 km = 0.621 mi: Concurrency terminus

=== Former Delaware Water Gap alternate route ===
U.S. Route 611 Alternate
- Location: Portland–Delaware Water Gap
- Existed: 1953–1965

U.S. Route 611 Alternate (US 611 Alt.) was an alternate route of US 611 that ran between Portland and Stroudsburg across the Delaware Water Gap. US 611 Alt. began at Portland in Northampton County, where US 611 crossed the Portland–Columbia Toll Bridge into New Jersey. From here, it headed north on the west bank of the Delaware River, passing through Slateford. The route traversed the Delaware Water Gap into Monroe County and continued to Delaware Water Gap, where US 611 Alt. reached its northern terminus at an intersection with US 611 at Foxtown Hill Road.

US 611 Alt. was designated in 1953 on the former alignment of US 611 when US 611 was realigned to use a new alignment across the river in New Jersey, crossing the Delaware River twice on the Portland–Columbia Toll Bridge and the Delaware Water Gap Toll Bridge. US 611 Alt. was proposed to be extended from Delaware Water Gap north along the former alignment of US 611 through Stroudsburg to Scotrun after US 611 was realigned to follow I-80. However, AASHO denied the extension of US 611 Alt. from Delaware Water Gap to Scotrun on December 1, 1962, and instead suggested that Pennsylvania resubmit the request by establishing a business route along the former alignment of US 611.

An extension of US 611 Alt. north along the former alignment of US 611 to an interchange with I-80 and US 611 west of Stroudsburg was denied by AASHO on June 18, 1963. In 1963, the PDH recommended replacing US 611 Alt. with US 611, with the US 611 designation to be removed from I-80.

On December 5, 1964, AASHO approved the elimination of the US 611 Alt. designation. US 611 Alt. was replaced by US 611 in 1965 when US 611 was rerouted out of New Jersey. I-80 had replaced the alignment of US 611 in New Jersey.

Major intersections

County	Location	mi	km	Destinations	Notes
Northampton	Portland			US 611 (Portland–Columbia Toll Bridge/North Delaware Drive) – Mount Bethel, Easton, New Jersey, New York	Interchange; southern terminus
Monroe	Delaware Water Gap			US 611 (Foxtown Hill Road) – Stroudsburg, New Jersey	Northern terminus
1.000 mi = 1.609 km; 1.000 km = 0.621 mi
