= Nockamixon Township, Pennsylvania =

Township in Pennsylvania, US

Nockamixon Township
- Township
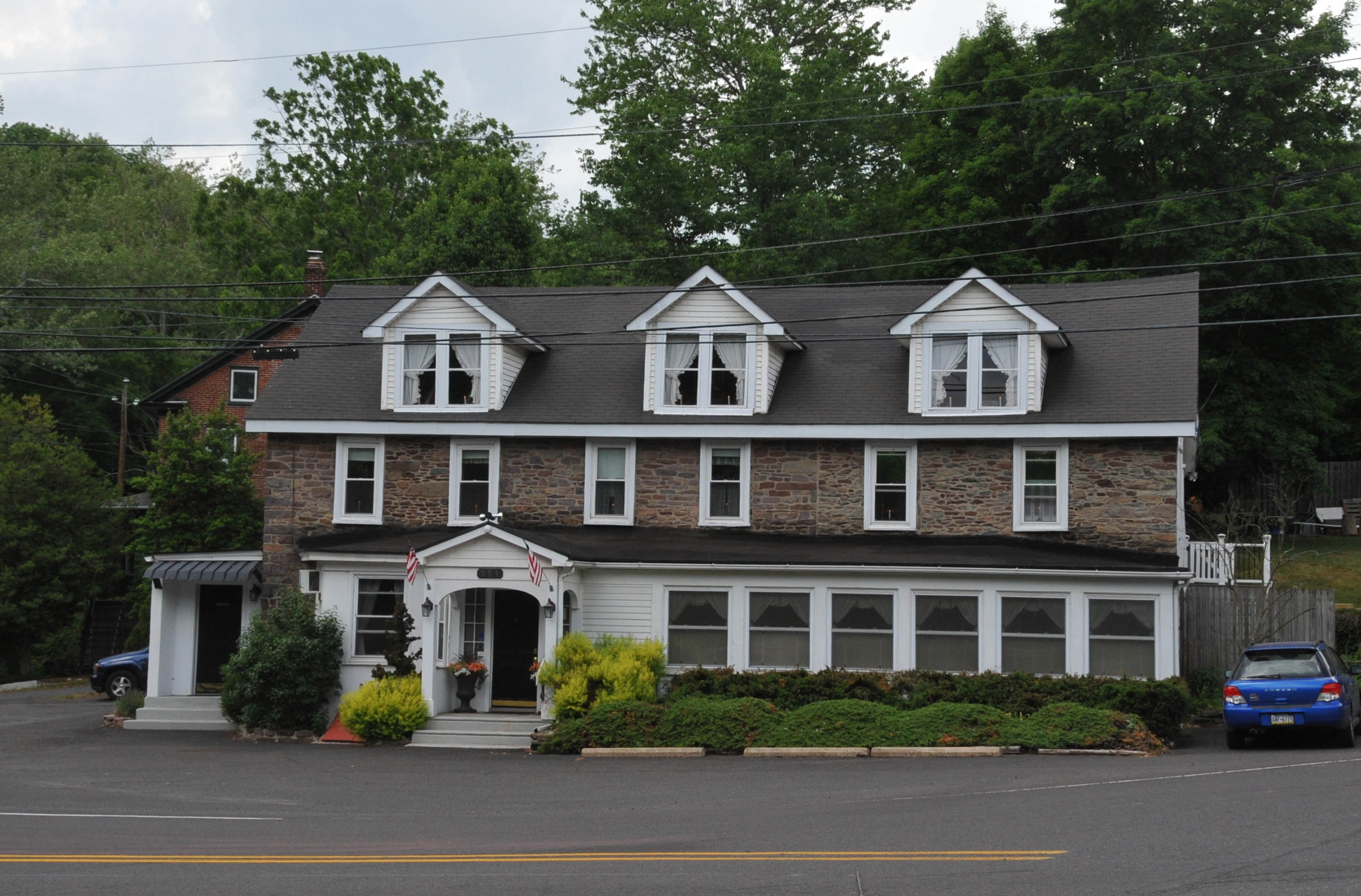
- Ferndale Inn in Nockamixon Township

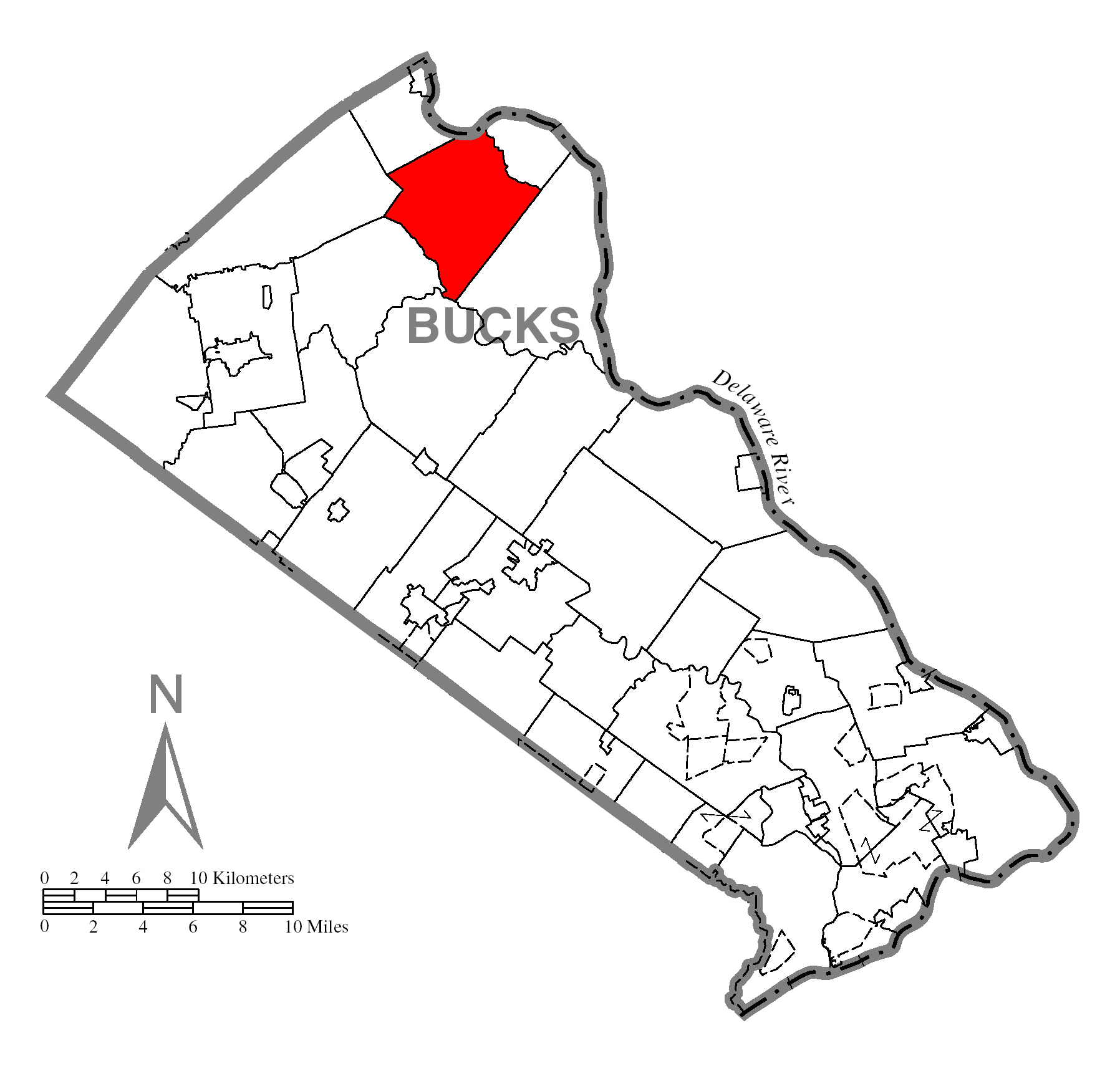
- Map of Nockamixon Township in Bucks County

- Location in Pennsylvania and the United States Nockamixon Township (the United States)
- Coordinates: 40°29′30″N 75°10′59″W
- Country: United States
- State: Pennsylvania
- County: Bucks

Area
  - Total: 22.37 sq mi (57.95 km^{2})
  - Land: 22.05 sq mi (57.10 km^{2})
  - Water: 0.33 sq mi (0.86 km^{2})
- Elevation: 495 ft (151 m)

Population (2010)
  - Total: 3,441
  - Estimate (2016): 3,394
  - Density: 153.9/sq mi (59.44/km^{2})
- Time zone: UTC-5 (EST)
  - Summer (DST): UTC-4 (EDT)
- Area code: 610
- FIPS code: 42-017-54576
- Website: www.nockamixontownship.org

Nockamixon Township is a township in Bucks County, Pennsylvania, United States. The population was 3,441 at the 2010 census.

== Geography ==
According to the U.S. Census Bureau, the township has a total area of 22.6 square miles (58.5 km^{2}), of which 22.2 square miles (57.5 km^{2}) is land and 0.4 square mile (1.0 km^{2}) (1.73%) is water. It is drained by the Delaware River, which separates it from New Jersey. The township's villages include Bucksville, Fehrtown, Ferndale, Frogtown, Harrow, Kintnersville (also in Durham Township), and Revere.

Natural features include Beaver Creek, Cauffman Hill, Gallows Hill, Gallows Run, Haycock Creek, Lake Warren, Narrows Creek, The Narrows (Nockamixon Cliffs), and Tinicum Creek.

The Delaware Canal and Pennsylvania Route 32 by the Nockamixon Cliffs

=== Neighboring municipalities ===
- Durham Township (northwest)
- Springfield Township (west)
- Haycock Township (southwest)
- Bedminster Township (south)
- Tinicum Township (southeast)
- Bridgeton Township (northeast)
- Holland Township, New Jersey (north)
- East Rockhill Township (south)

== Demographics ==
Historical population
Census	Pop.	Note	%±
1930	1,075		—
1940	1,079		0.4%
1950	1,305		20.9%
1960	1,785		36.8%
1970	2,095		17.4%
1980	2,787		33.0%
1990	3,329		19.4%
2000	3,517		5.6%
2010	3,441		−2.2%
2020	3,379		−1.8%

As of the 2010 census, the township was 96.2% White, 0.3% Black or African American, 0.1% Native American, 0.3% Asian, and 1.4% were two or more races. 1.7% of the population were of Hispanic or Latino ancestry.

As of the 2000 census, there were 3,517 people, 1,337 households, and 989 families residing in the township. The population density was 158.5 inhabitants per square mile (61.2/km^{2}). There were 1,411 housing units at an average density of 63.6 units per square mile (24.6 units/km^{2}). The racial makeup of the township was 98.29% White, 0.51% African American, 0.03% Native American, 0.11% Asian, 0.11% Pacific Islander, 0.14% from other races, and 0.80% from two or more races. Hispanic or Latino of any race were 0.60% of the population.

There were 1,337 households, out of which 31.1% had children under the age of 18 living with them, 62.5% were married couples living together, 7.4% had a female householder with no husband present, and 26.0% were non-families. 18.8% of all households were made up of individuals, and 5.5% had someone living alone who was 65 years of age or older. The average household size was 2.63 and the average family size was 3.04.

In the township, the population was spread out, with 23.5% under the age of 18, 7.3% from 18 to 24, 29.7% from 25 to 44, 29.9% from 45 to 64, and 9.6% who were 65 years of age or older. The median age was 40 years. For every 100 females, there were 105.8 males. For every 100 females age 18 and over, there were 105.2 males.

The median income for a household in the township was $60,231, and the median income for a family was $66,250. Males had a median income of $45,511 versus $32,446 for females. The per capita income for the township was $26,145. About 1.0% of families and 4.0% of the population were below the poverty line, including 5.0% of those under age 18 and 7.5% of those age 65 or over. Nockamixon township is patrolled by the Pennsylvania State Police, Dublin Barracks.

== Climate ==
According to the Köppen climate classification system, Nockamixon Township, Pennsylvania has a hot-summer, wet all year, humid continental climate (Dfa). Dfa climates are characterized by at least one month having an average mean temperature ≤ 32.0 °F (≤ 0.0 °C), at least four months with an average mean temperature ≥ 50.0 °F (≥ 10.0 °C), at least one month with an average mean temperature ≥ 71.6 °F (≥ 22.0 °C), and no significant precipitation difference between seasons. During the summer months, episodes of extreme heat and humidity can occur with heat index values ≥ 100 °F (≥ 38 °C). On average, the wettest month of the year is July which corresponds with the annual peak in thunderstorm activity. During the winter months, episodes of extreme cold and wind can occur with wind chill values < 0 °F (< -18 °C). The plant hardiness zone is 6b with an average annual extreme minimum air temperature of −2.9 °F (−19.4 °C). The average seasonal (Nov-Apr) snowfall total is between 30 and 36 inches (76 and 91 centimetres), and the average snowiest month is February which corresponds with the annual peak in nor'easter activity.

Climate data for Nockamixon Township, Bucks County, Pennsylvania (1981 – 2010 averages)
Month	Jan	Feb	Mar	Apr	May	Jun	Jul	Aug	Sep	Oct	Nov	Dec	Year
Mean daily maximum °F (°C)	37.4 (3.0)	41.0 (5.0)	49.4 (9.7)	61.8 (16.6)	71.6 (22.0)	80.1 (26.7)	84.3 (29.1)	82.5 (28.1)	75.7 (24.3)	64.4 (18.0)	53.4 (11.9)	41.8 (5.4)	62.0 (16.7)
Daily mean °F (°C)	28.8 (−1.8)	31.5 (−0.3)	39.2 (4.0)	50.3 (10.2)	60.1 (15.6)	69.1 (20.6)	73.6 (23.1)	71.9 (22.2)	64.6 (18.1)	53.3 (11.8)	43.6 (6.4)	33.5 (0.8)	51.7 (10.9)
Mean daily minimum °F (°C)	20.1 (−6.6)	22.1 (−5.5)	28.9 (−1.7)	38.8 (3.8)	48.5 (9.2)	58.1 (14.5)	62.8 (17.1)	61.3 (16.3)	53.6 (12.0)	42.2 (5.7)	33.8 (1.0)	25.1 (−3.8)	41.4 (5.2)
Average precipitation inches (mm)	3.50 (89)	2.87 (73)	3.74 (95)	4.20 (107)	4.25 (108)	4.33 (110)	5.12 (130)	4.12 (105)	4.46 (113)	4.54 (115)	3.79 (96)	4.16 (106)	49.08 (1,247)
Average relative humidity (%)	68.7	65.0	60.3	58.7	63.3	69.2	69.0	72.0	72.9	71.2	69.8	70.1	67.5
Average dew point °F (°C)	19.8 (−6.8)	21.1 (−6.1)	26.6 (−3.0)	36.4 (2.4)	47.6 (8.7)	58.6 (14.8)	62.8 (17.1)	62.4 (16.9)	55.7 (13.2)	44.2 (6.8)	34.4 (1.3)	24.8 (−4.0)	41.3 (5.2)
Source: PRISM Climate Group

== Transportation ==
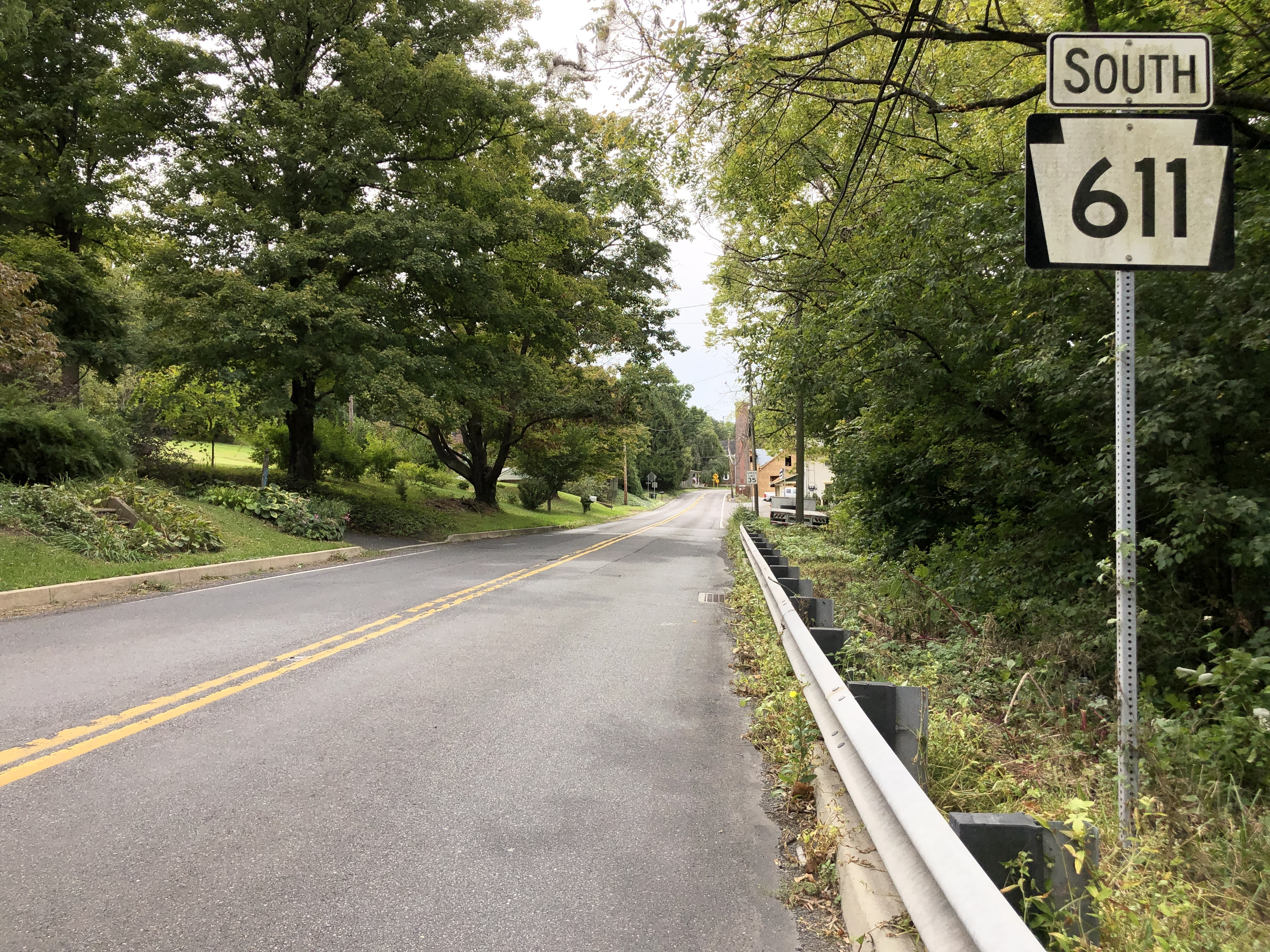
PA Route 611 south in Nockamixon Township

As of 2018 there were 58.48 miles (94.11 km) of public roads in Nockamixon Township, of which 20.35 miles (32.75 km) were maintained by the Pennsylvania Department of Transportation (PennDOT) and 38.13 miles (61.36 km) were maintained by the township.

Numbered highways traversing Nockamixon Township include Pennsylvania Route 32, Pennsylvania Route 412, Pennsylvania Route 563, and Pennsylvania Route 611. PA 611 utilizes Easton Road on a north–south alignment through the heart of the township. PA 32 follows River Road eastward from PA 611 adjacent to the Delaware River across the northern portion of the township. PA 412 utilizes Durham Road heading northwestward from PA 611 across southwestern portions of the township. PA 563 follows Mountain View Drive southwestward from PA 412 across the southwestern part of the township.

== Ecology ==
According to the A. W. Kuchler U.S. potential natural vegetation types, Nockamixon Township, Pennsylvania would have an Appalachian Oak (104) vegetation type with an Eastern Hardwood Forest (25) vegetation form.
