= Upper Black Eddy, Pennsylvania =

Unincorporated community in Pennsylvania, US

- Unincorporated community
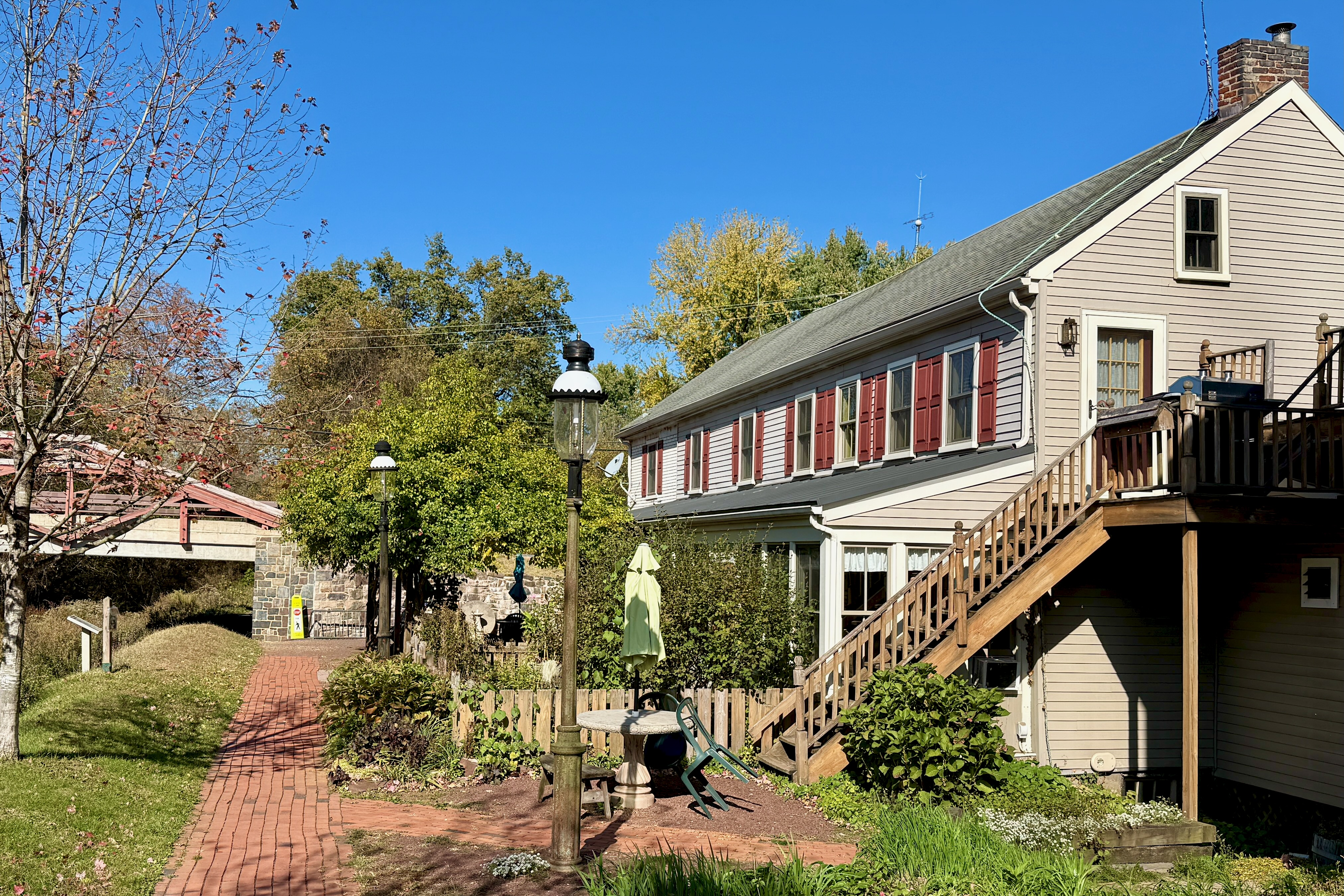
- Homestead General Store along the Delaware Canal

- Location within Pennsylvania
- Coordinates: 40°33′55″N 75°05′59″W
- Country: United States
- State: Pennsylvania
- County: Bucks
- Township: Bridgeton
- Elevation: 131 ft (40 m)
- Time zone: UTC-5 (Eastern (EST))
  - Summer (DST): UTC-4 (EDT)
- ZIP Code: 18972
- Area codes: 484 and 610
- GNIS feature ID: 1190224

Upper Black Eddy is a village located in northern Bucks County, Pennsylvania, United States. The village is 58 miles (93 km) west-southwest of New York City and 45 miles (72 km) north of Philadelphia.

Upper Black Eddy is part of Bridgeton Township, which also borders the adjacent borough of Milford via the Delaware River Joint Toll Bridge Commission's free Upper Black Eddy–Milford Bridge over the Delaware River.

== History ==
Upper Black Eddy originates from the Black family, who operated a hotel at this point on the Delaware River and did share part of its unique name with the former village of (Lower Black Eddy) now known as Point Pleasant, Pennsylvania.

The village's growth in the early 19th century was due to the opening of the Pennsylvania Canal passing through the village as a result canal-related businesses sprang up quickly, including a shipyard, mule stables, general store and several hotels; the most notable was the Upper Black Eddy Inn. This was later transformed into Chef Tell's Manor House, which closed in 2004 and was demolished in 2010.

The Upper Black Eddy portion of the Pennsylvania Canal was also known as "Candy Bend". Origins of that name are due to the canal boats throwing coal to the residents as they threw candy back to the boats. There is no conclusive evidence to validate this local lore.

Upper Black Eddy has two notable geographic features:

- Ringing Rocks Park. This is a four-acre (16,000 m^{2}) boulder field of weathered Diabase rocks, some of which "ring" much like a bell when struck with a hammer. This park also includes Buck County's highest waterfall situated on High Falls Creek.
- Nockamixon Cliffs. 400 foot shale cliffs overlooking the Delaware River is located within the Delaware Canal State Park.
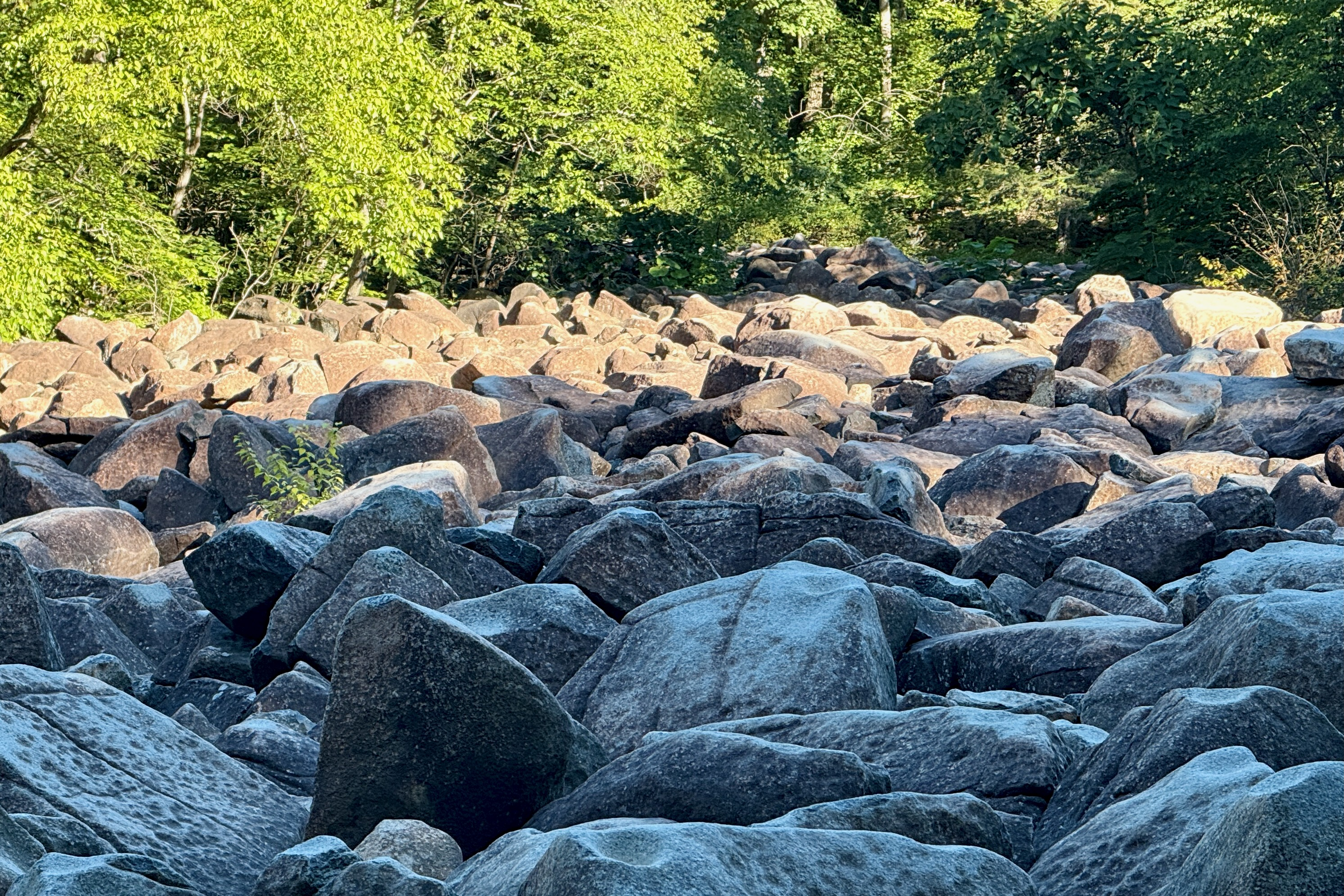
Boulder field at Ringing Rocks Park

Nockamixon Cliffs next to the Delaware Canal

== Notable people ==
- Danny Federici, organ, glockenspiel, and accordion player for Bruce Springsteen's E Street Band
- Leslie Parrish, actress, The Manchurian Candidate and Li'l Abner
- Bill White, former Major League Baseball player and executive who later became a New York Yankees sportscaster
- Wolfgang Zuckermann, musician
