= Bell stone =

Rock that produces a bell-like sound when struck

A phonolite bell stone is struck at Cerro de la Campana in Hermosillo, Mexico

A bell stone (also bellstone) is a rock that produces a bell-like sound when struck. A type of lithophone, bell stones are significant in ethnography and are typically identified through local written history and folklore in combination with physical archeological details such as cup-shaped depressions.

== Instances ==
=== In the Andes ===
Bell stones are present in the Andes, and feature in one local creation myth involving God and Supay.

=== In Mexico ===
People in and around San Lucas Xolos in Tizayuca, Hidalgo, Mexico tell stories of "stones that sound like bells" which ring when struck with other stones. Some such stones exist at the site of the first Xolotl Chichimeca capital, located near the town. The stones are located in an outcropping of andesite at the top of the hill, which is represented in the Codex Xolotl.

=== In Norway ===
Rocks that ring when struck are mentioned in historical documents from Norway; about 10 have been identified. One such stone near Lom is mentioned in 18th-century documents as the most treasured item in the parish, and is still locally known as the "Bell Stone" or "Singing Stone".

=== In South Africa ===
An ironstone rock near the grave of Ntsikana in the Eastern Cape of South Africa is known as Intsimbi kaNtsikana, literally "Ntsikana's bell". Local legend states that Ntsikana struck the rock to produce bell tones at dawn and dusk every day between 1815 and his 1821 death, and that it produced the notes with which he composed his hymns. In the 1980s, the rock was found to be capable of producing three notes in the first inversion of a triad.

=== In the United States ===
==== Hawaii ====
Various phonolite stones were created by volcanic activity on Oahu. These stones are known in the Hawaiian language as pohaku kani or pohaku kikeke.

The Wailua Bellstone, located near the Poliahu Heiau at the Wailua Complex of Heiaus and made of reddish basalt, produces a hollow bell-like sound when struck with a cobble. It was used to announce important events including the births of aliʻi and the approach of religious or royal processions.

==== Pennsylvania ====
A hill known as the Klingelberg or "Ringing Hill" near Pottsgrove, Pennsylvania was reported in 1945 to be covered with rock fragments which produced bell-like tones when struck with another stone. The report compared them to "the bell stone mentioned by Linnaeus in the Westgothische Reise".

==== Puerto Rico ====
A stone known as the Piedra de la Campana ("Bell Stone") in the Río Grande de Loíza near Gurabo, Puerto Rico stands on top of two other stones and is said to have been used as a bell by the indigenous people.

==== Arizona ====
Tonopah, Palo Verde Hills, at a minor summit described as Geocache GCA4FE is a Bell Stone or Bell Rock. https://www.geocaching.com/geocache/GCA4FE.

=== In Uruguay ===
Seams of diabase in southwestern Uruguay have produced some stones that vibrate with a bell-like tone when struck. Two large boulders of this material are located three meters apart in a forested area near the Arroyo de la Virgen; the smaller one produces two distinct tones separated by a minor third. Little is known about the possible use of the stones by the indigenous people of Uruguay.

== See also ==
- Rock gong
