= Rock gong =

Musical instrument made of rock

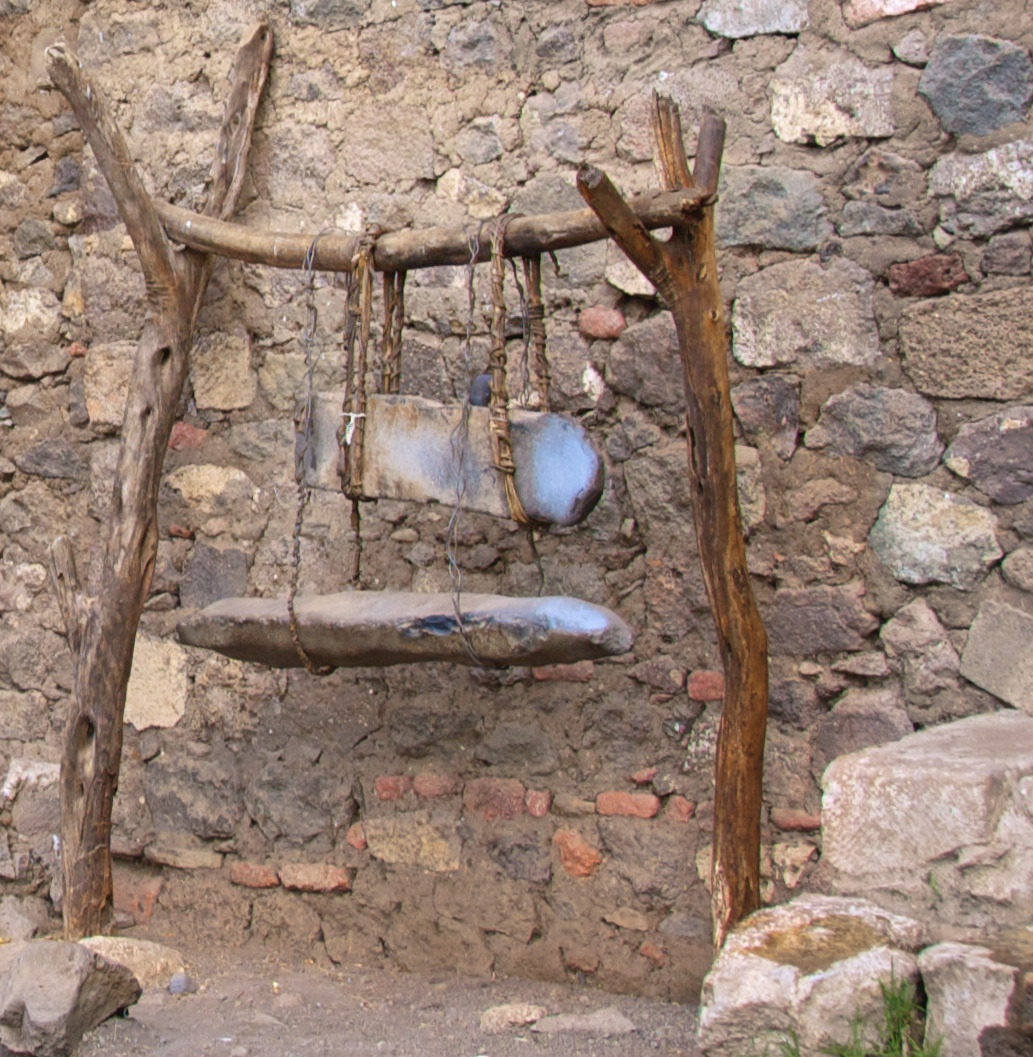
- Ethiopian Lithophones with Stand, Monastery of Na’akuto La’ab

Percussion instrument
- Other names: Kid Kongil
- Hornbostel–Sachs classification: 111.22 (Directly struck idiophone)
- Developed: Antiquity

Related instruments
- Ringing rocks

A rock gong is a slab of rock that is hit like a drum, and is an example of a lithophone. Examples have been found in Africa, Asia, and Europe. Regional names for the rock gong include kungering, kwerent dutse, gwangalan, kungereng, kongworian, and kuge. These names are all onomatopœic, except for "kuge" which is the Hausa word for a double iron bell and "dawal" which is the Ge`ez word for a church's stone gong.

== History ==
Rock gongs have been found in various African locations, such as sites in Burkina Faso, Niger, Nigeria, Sudan, Tanzania in Siuyu and Ughaugha, also in Serengeti (see Itambu, et al. 2018), Uganda, and Zambia. The Kupgal petroglyph site in India, which was originally discovered in 1892 (though lost and rediscovered in the 21st century), includes a large number of rock gongs alongside rock art. The site dates to the Neolithic period.

Rock gongs were brought to the attention of the anthropological community in 1956 by archaeologist Bernard Fagg. Fagg identified that the first recorded discovery of rock gongs (or "ringing rocks used for the production of musical notes") was in Birnin Kudu, Nigeria, in June 1955. He drew a link between the geographic distribution of rock gongs and cave paintings, stating that the gongs' proximity to cave paintings "leaves little doubt that they are associated in some way".

== Description ==
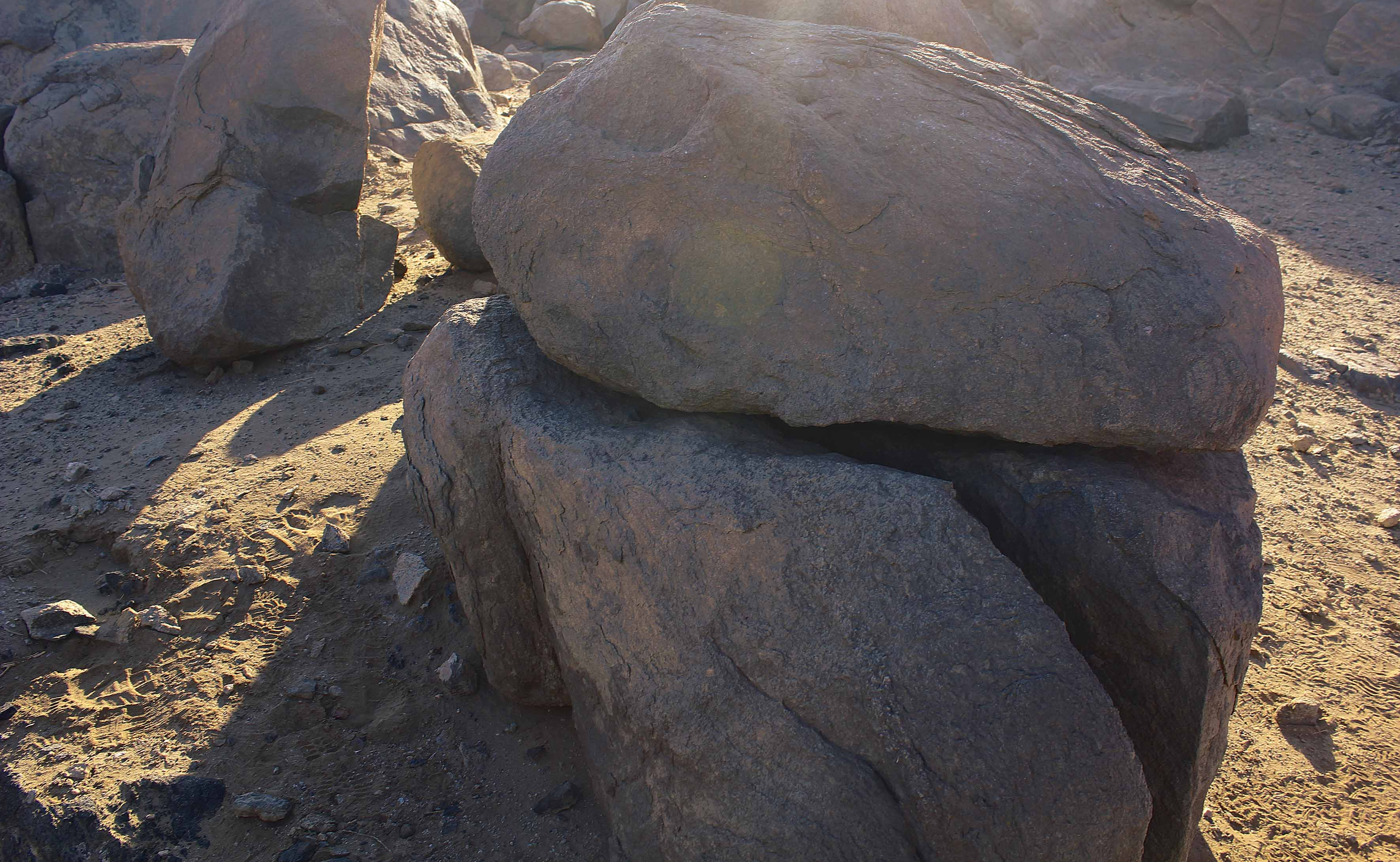
Rock Gong at Tombos (Nubia)

Rock gongs are often large dolerite rocks; Fagg describes examples that weigh up to several tons. They are almost always entirely solid, as playing rocks in other such states would result in a hollow and less metallic tone. Fagg identifies that the tone produced by the vibrating rock is not necessarily influenced by the size of the rock, provided that the resonating stone is not dampened by the solid earth.

Rock gongs would be played by striking the rock's surface with a hand-held stone. This beater would often be made of igneous stone, but examples of metamorphic quartzite beaters have been discovered.

Although often played solo, gongs can be played as an ensemble, with evidence that gongs for four players were sometimes used. These larger stones can have up to 50 tuned depressions. When measured against a tuning fork, a depression on one particular gong was found to have a fundamental frequency of 216 Hz.

Continuous playing of the instrument produces smooth indentations in the rock and a matte-like texture.

== See also ==
- Bell stone
- Ringing rocks

== Sources ==
- Tahir, Yahia Fadl (2012), Rock Gongs from the Nile Cataract Region; In: Archaeological and Traditional Contexts, NYAME AKUMA, vol. 77
- BBC (2004-03-19), Ancient Indians Made 'Rock Music', London: BBC Online
- Beck, John (1995), Encyclopedia of Percussion, London: Taylor and Francis, ISBN 0-8240-4788-5
- Fagg, Bernard (1956), "The Discovery of Multiple Rock Gongs in Nigeria", African Music, 1, Johannesburg, South Africa: International Library of African Music
- Fagg, M Catherine (1997), Rock Music, Oxford: Pitt Rivers Museum, ISBN 0-902793-39-X
- Goodwin, A J H (1957), "Rock Gongs, Chutes, Paintings and Fertility", The South African Archaeological Bulletin, 12, Cape Town, South Africa: South African Archaeological Society
- Integrated Sustainable Rural Development Strategy (2005), Site 1: The Rock Gong Complex, Department of Environmental Affairs and Tourism
- Historical Society of Nigeria (1962), Journal of the Historical Society of Nigeria, vol. 1, The Society
- King, Anthony (1958), "A Report on the Use of Stone Clappers for the Accompaniment of Sacred Songs", African Music, 2, Johannesburg, South Africa: International Library of African Music
- Montagu, Jeremy (2007), Origins and Development of Musical Instruments, Lanham, MD: Scarecrow Press, ISBN 0-8108-5657-3
- Soper, Robert C (2006), The Terrace Builders of Nyanga, Oxford: African Books Collective, ISBN 1-77922-061-8
