= Falls Creek (Delaware River tributary) =

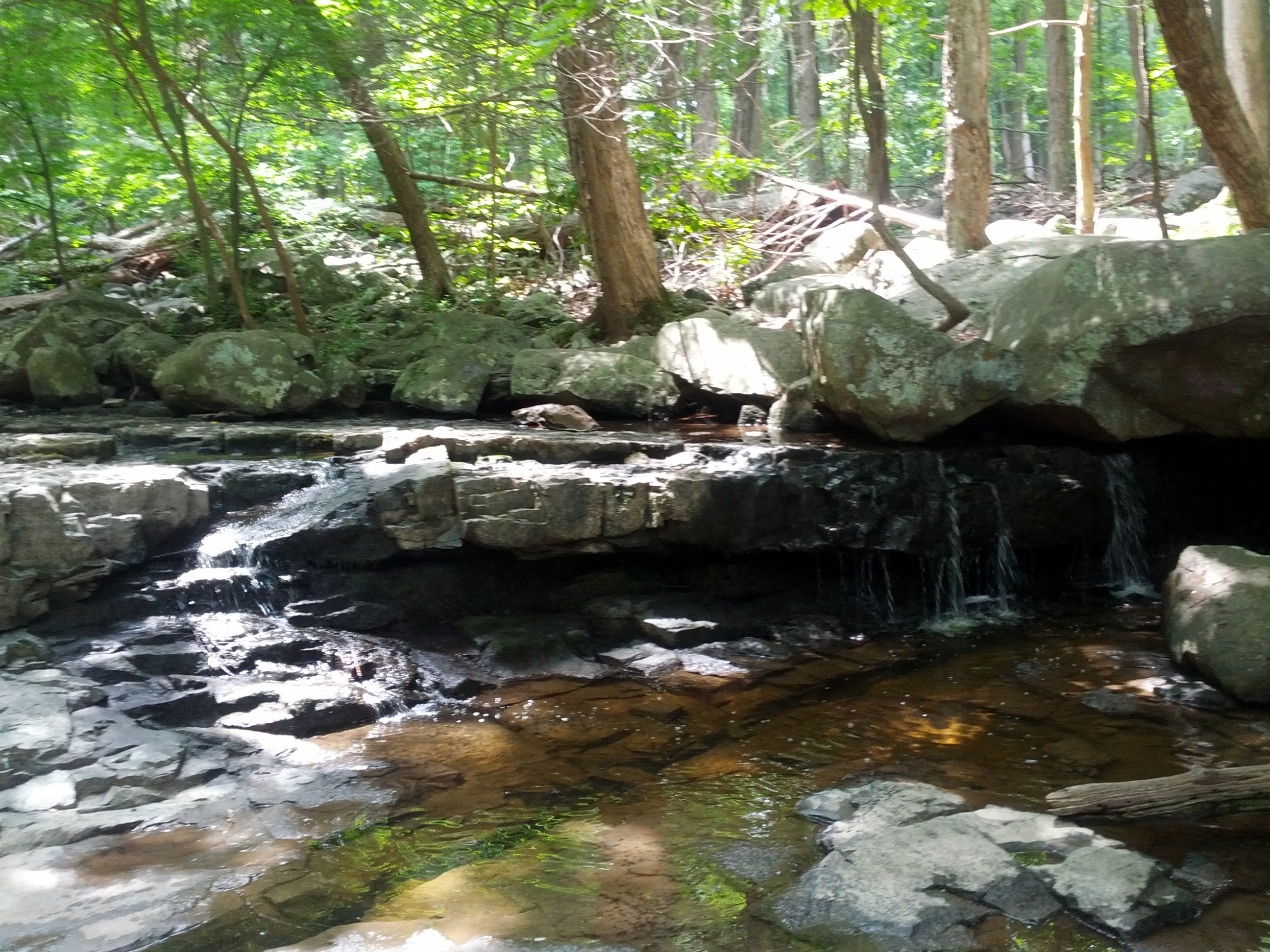

Location
- State: Pennsylvania
- County: Bucks County
- Township: Bridgeton Township

Physical characteristics
- Source
  - coordinates: 40°33′17″N 75°8′32″W
  - elevation: 535 feet (163 m)
- Mouth: Delaware River
  - coordinates: 40°34′21″N 75°7′15″W
  - elevation: 140 feet (43 m)
- Length: 1.40 miles (2.25 km)

Basin features
- Progression: Falls Creek → Delaware River
- River system: Delaware River
- Bridges: Woodland Drive, Ringing Rocks Road, Pennsylvania Route 32 (River Road), Delaware Canal

Falls Creek, also known as High Falls Creek, is a tributary of the Delaware River wholly contained in Bridgeton Township, Bucks County, Pennsylvania in the United States. The creek boasts the highest falls in Bucks County.

== Statistics ==
Falls Creek was entered into the Geographic Names Information System on 1 February 1990 as identification number 1202458. Its length is approximately 1.4 miles (2.3 km), the elevation at the source is 535 feet (163 m) and at the mouth is 140 feet (43 m). The average slope is about 282 feet per mile, or 52 meters per kilometer. However, the stretch through the falls is about 2,040 feet (620 m) (0.386 miles (0.621 km)) in length with a drop of about 300 feet (91 m), so the slope in that region is about 750 feet per mile or 146 meters per kilometer.

== Course ==
Falls Creek rises with Pennsylvania State Game Lands Number 56 to the west and Ringing Rocks Park to the northeast. The creek flows for a very short distance to the east then turns north where it receives a tributary from the right, then continues north until it flows under the Delaware Canal and then empties into the Delaware River. Just a short distance from the canal, it passes over High Falls, the highest waterfall in Bucks County.

== Geology ==
- Appalachian Highlands Division
  - Piedmont Province
    - Gettysburg-Newark Lowland Section
      - Brunswick Formation
      - Diabase
- Atlantic Plain
  - Atlantic Coastal Plain Province
    - Lowland and Intermediate Upland Section
      - Trenton Gravel

Most of the path of Falls Creek lies in a bed of igneous rock of diabase formed as an intrusion into the surrounding Brunswick Formation. The diabase consists of dark gray to black rock, mineralogy consists of labradorite and augite. As it flows down the High Falls, it transitions into the Brunswick, laid down during the Jurassic and Triassic and consists of mudstone, siltstone, and shale. Mineralogy includes argillite and hornfels. Lastly, it enters the river lowland known as Trenton Gravel, a bed laid down during the Quaternary, consisting of sand and clay.

== Crossings and Bridges ==
Crossing	NBI Number	Length	Lanes	Spans	Material/Design	Built	Reconstructed	Latitude	Longitude
Woodland Drive	-	-	-	-	-	-	-	-	-
Ringing Rocks Road	7581	27.9 feet (8.5 m)	2	1	Concrete cast-in-place stringer/multi-beam or girder, bituminous wearing surface	1927	-	40°33'31"N	75°7'31"W
Pennsylvania Route 32 (River Road)	-	-	-	-	-	-	-	-	-
Delaware Canal High Falls Creek Culvert	-	-	-	-	-	-	2026	40°34′18.1″N	75°07′15″W

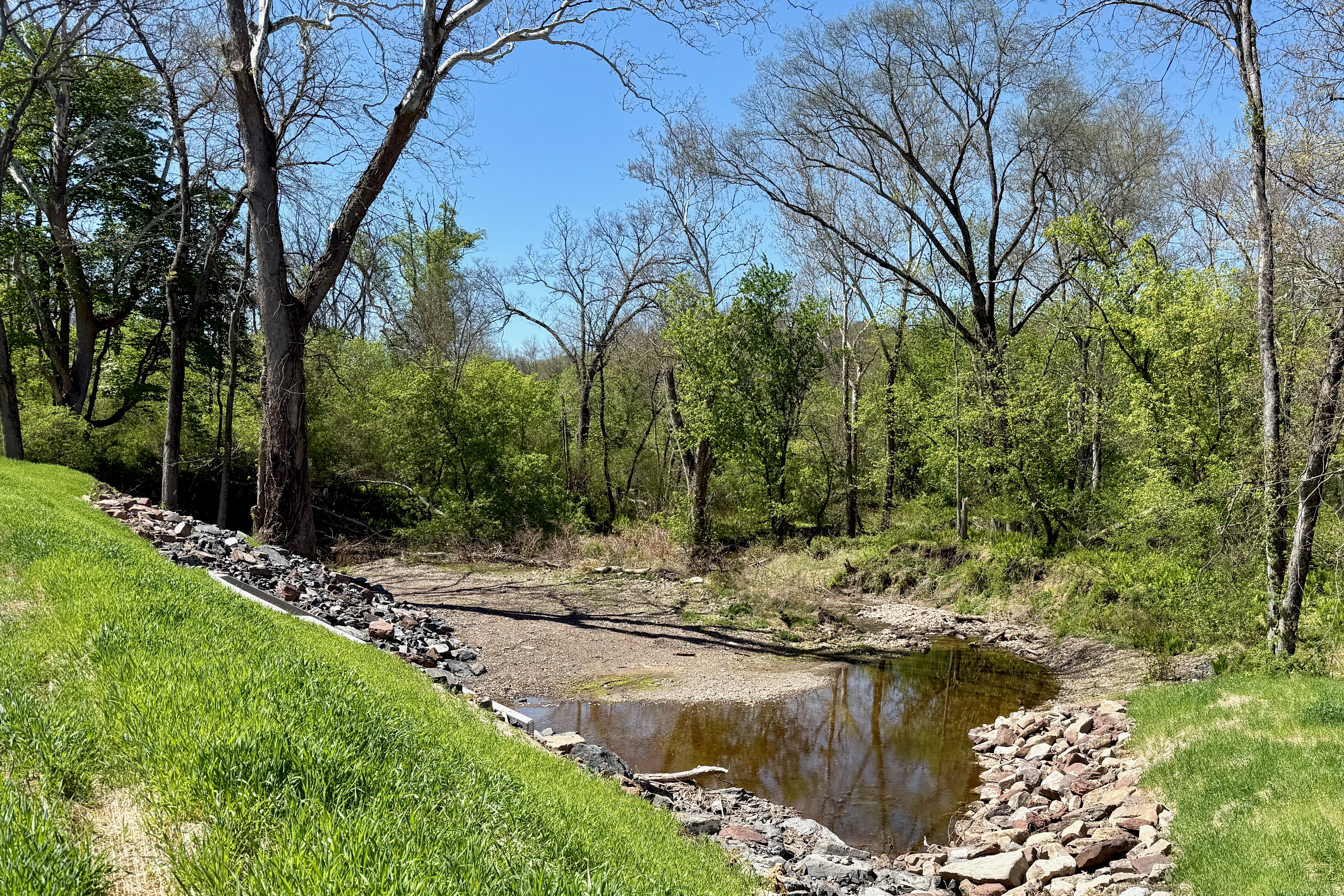
High Falls Creek Culvert

== See also ==
- List of rivers of the United States
- List of rivers of Pennsylvania
- List of Delaware River tributaries
