= Friedman Paul Erhardt =

American chef

- Born: November 5, 1943; Stuttgart, Germany
- Died: October 26, 2007 (aged 63); Upper Black Eddy, Pennsylvania, U.S.
- Occupation: Chef

Friedman Paul Erhardt (November 5, 1943 – October 26, 2007) was a German American pioneering early television chef. He was known as "Chef Tell" to his 40 million fans. He is widely regarded as one of the first chefs to enjoy widespread popularity on American television. Former Philadelphia Inquirer food writer, Elaine Tait, wrote, "Chef Tell is America's pioneer TV showman chef whose food always tastes good." Erhardt's thick German accent reportedly made him the inspiration for the Swedish Chef, a well known Muppet character on The Muppet Show, although Brian Henson denies this.

== Early life and education ==
Friedman Paul Erhardt was born in Stuttgart, Germany on November 5, 1943. He was the son of a German newspaper publisher. Erhardt earned the nickname "Tell" when he played the character William Tell in a school play. Later, when asked by his TV producer, Art Moore, what he would like to take as his TV persona, he replied, "I'm known as Tell, so call me 'Chef Tell.'"

Erhardt began his mandatory, three-year training to be a cook and a chef at the age of 13. Following his apprenticeship and further study and work in several hotels and restaurants in Europe, in 1970, he graduated at the age of 27 as Germany's youngest master chef up to that time. That same year, he led a team of chefs to the Gold Medal in the Cooking Olympics in West Germany, and was also named Chef of the Year. Two years later, invited by a former Miss Philadelphia, Janet Louise Nicoletti, whom he later married, he moved to the United States where he became the Executive Chef at the Barclay Hotel in Philadelphia.

== Career ==
Erhardt made his first television debut on a local Philadelphia television show called Dialing for Dollars in 1974. He was employed as a chef at the Marriott Hotel on City Avenue at the time. Now more commonly known as Chef Tell, his work on the show later earned him a regular 90-second cooking spot on a nationally syndicated show, PM Magazine. He often used the phrase, with his thick accent, "very simple, very easy" while cooking during his PM Magazine spots. His career led to guest appearances on Lifestyles of the Rich and Famous and earned Chef Tell time on QVC. He also hosted a show on PBS called In the Kitchen With Chef Tell. Chef Tell was known for his speed, for using humor in his cooking shows, and for his famous sign-off, "I SEE YOU!" He also was famous for his saying "I wish you had smellavision."

"He was the first of the great showman chefs," commented Elaine Tait, the former restaurant critic for The Philadelphia Inquirer. "Up until his era, chefs stayed in the kitchen."

Chef Tell's popularity with home cooks, and his German-accented personality, earned him a place in American popular culture as a true culinary icon. He was often parodied in comedy skits on Saturday Night Live and became a regular guest on Live with Regis and Kathie Lee.

In addition to his work in television, Chef Tell worked in a number of other culinary positions. He owned several restaurants in Philadelphia in the 1970s and 1980s. Walt Disney World commissioned him to design and bake an enormous cake for Donald Duck's 50th birthday in 1984, which was part of a grand celebration at Walt Disney World in Florida. For over 10 years in the 1980s and '90's, he owned and operated Chef Tell's Grand Old House on Grand Cayman Island. He later opened two restaurants in neighboring Bucks County, Pennsylvania, the short-lived Harrow Inne in Ottsville and the famous Chef Tell's Manor House in Upper Black Eddy, Pennsylvania.

Former U.S. President Richard Nixon, who often visited his daughter Julie Eisenhower in Pennsylvania, sometimes dined at another of Chef Tell's restaurants in Wayne. Nixon personally sponsored Erhardt's citizenship application in 1986. Nixon reportedly was the guest speaker at his oath of citizenship ceremony. Senator Arlen Specter sent to Tell the US flag that flew over the US Congress building that day, at Nixon's request.

Chef Tell became a spokesperson for major corporate food and cookware product lines, including Nordic Ware and Health Craft Cookware, among others. He also wrote and edited cookbooks, and was a best-selling author as a result of his Chef Tell's Quick Cuisine cookbook. Another cookbook intended specifically for people with diabetes was never published after his death. Erhardt was diagnosed as diabetic, but overcame this condition, and a need for diabetic medicines, with dietary changes, and exercise.

Tell spent the last two and half years of his life teaching culinary skills at The Restaurant School at Walnut Hill College in Philadelphia.

== Death ==
Tell died on October 26, 2007, of heart failure at his home in Upper Black Eddy, Pennsylvania, at the age of 63, 10 days before his 64th birthday. He was survived by his wife of 19 years, Bunny, his son, Torsten, and a grandson.
