= Bridgeton Township, Pennsylvania =

Township in Pennsylvania, US

- Township
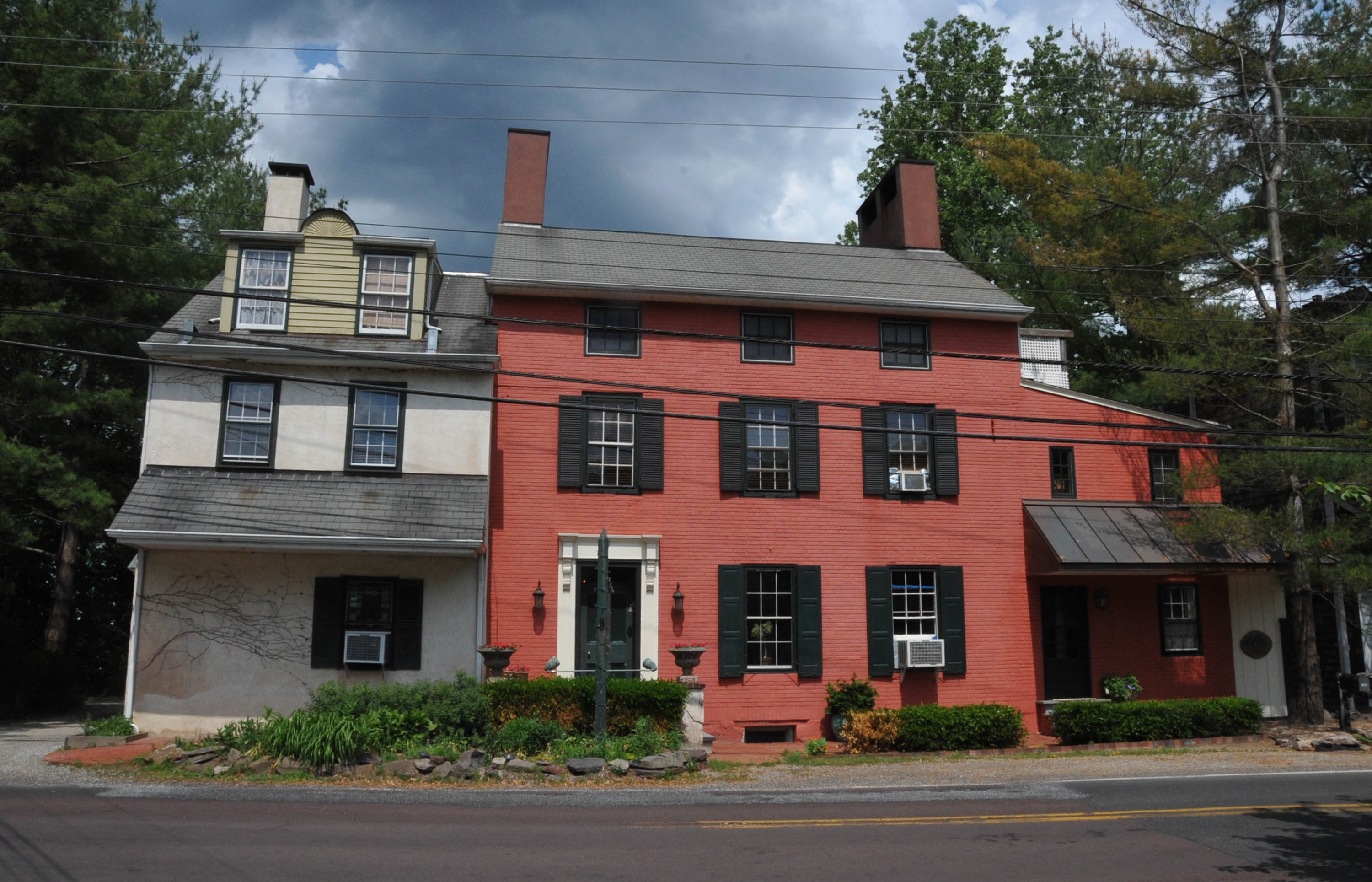
- House in Upper Black Eddy in the township

- Seal

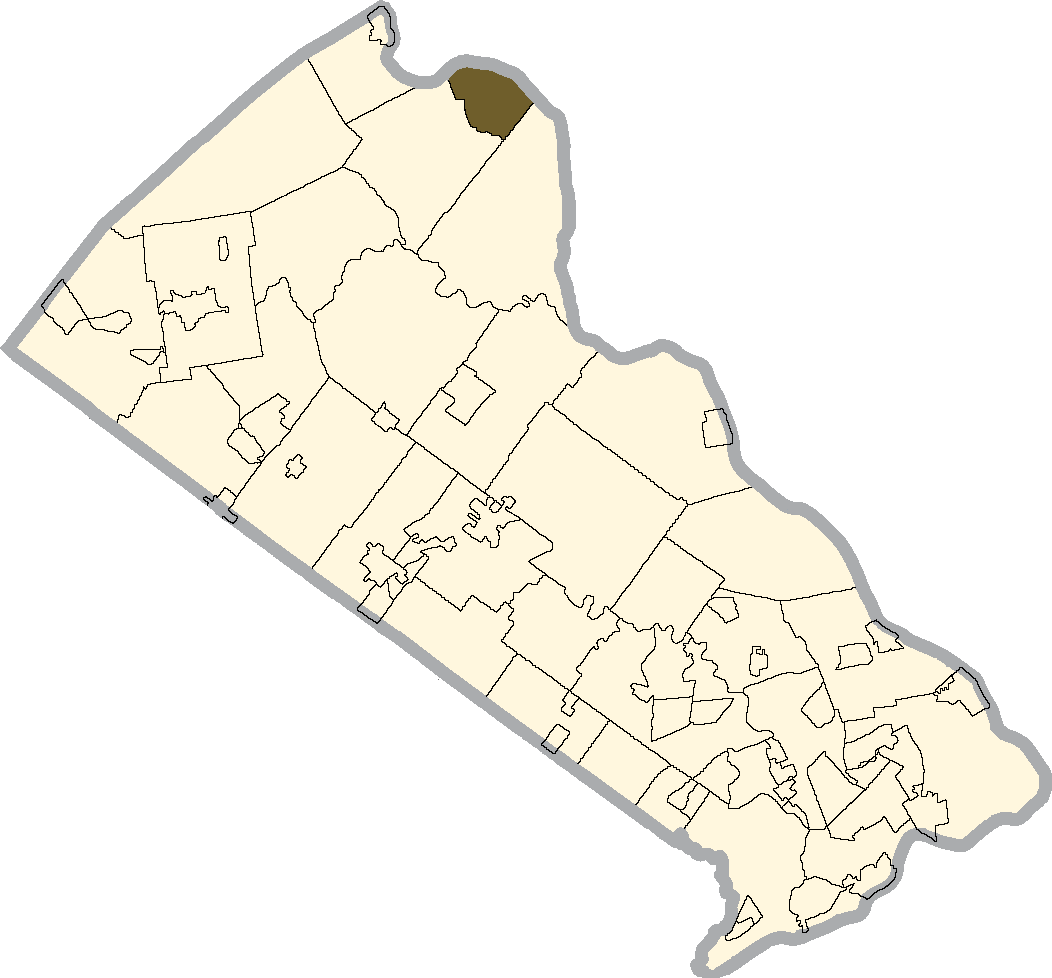
- Location of Bridgeton Township in Bucks County, Pennsylvania

- Location of Bridgeton Township in Pennsylvania and the United States Bridgeton Township (the United States)
- Coordinates: 40°33′29″N 75°06′37″W
- Country: United States
- State: Pennsylvania
- County: Bucks

Area
  - Total: 6.80 sq mi (17.62 km^{2})
  - Land: 6.58 sq mi (17.05 km^{2})
  - Water: 0.22 sq mi (0.57 km^{2})
- Elevation: 568 ft (173 m)

Population (2020)
  - Total: 1,234
  - Density: 187.5/sq mi (72.38/km^{2})
- Time zone: UTC-5 (EST)
  - Summer (DST): UTC-4 (EDT)
- Area code: 610
- FIPS code: 42-017-08592
- Website: bridgetontwp.org

Bridgeton Township is a township in Bucks County, Pennsylvania, United States. The population was 1,234 at the 2020 census. The township was originally a part of adjacent Nockamixon Township, but a division was arranged and signed on May 24, 1890. This accord split an area of Nockamixon which ran west from the banks of the Delaware River to approximately one third the breadth of the original township. This smaller area was named "Bridgeton", since it was the site of Upper Black Eddy–Milford Bridge covered wooden truss bridge built in 1842, which connected the towns of Upper Black Eddy, Pennsylvania and Milford, New Jersey. The original covered bridge was replaced by a truss bridge in 1933.

The township originally contained several tiny hamlets, such as the aforementioned Upper Black Eddy, Narrowsville, and Rupletown. Upper Black's Eddy, as it was originally called, and Raubsville were named for notable landholders, while Narrowsville was named for a particularly thin portion of the Delaware River. With the construction of a centralized post office in Upper Black Eddy, the usage of separate names for the smaller towns ceased in an official capacity, and the everyday errands of residents became centered on the largest of the towns.

What little commercial trade exists in the township is now centered solely in Upper Black Eddy, with any evidence of there being any distinctive, smaller villages existing only on outdated road-signs and maps. Ringing Rocks Park is located within the township, as well as state game hunting lands. Bridgeton Township is also home to the Homestead General Store, the oldest continually operating general store on the Delaware Canal.

== Geography ==
According to the U.S. Census Bureau, the township has a total area of 6.8 square miles (18 km^{2}), of which 6.6 square miles (17 km^{2}) is land and 0.2 square miles (0.52 km^{2}) (3.24%) is water. It is drained by the Delaware River, which separates it from New Jersey. Its villages include Narrowsville, Rupletown, and Upper Black Eddy.

=== Natural Features ===
Cauffman Hill (alt. spellings: Coffman Hill [USGS], Kauffman Hill [hist. namesake]), Falls Creek, Mine Spring, Narrows Creek, The Narrows (Nockamixon Cliffs), and Ringing Rocks.

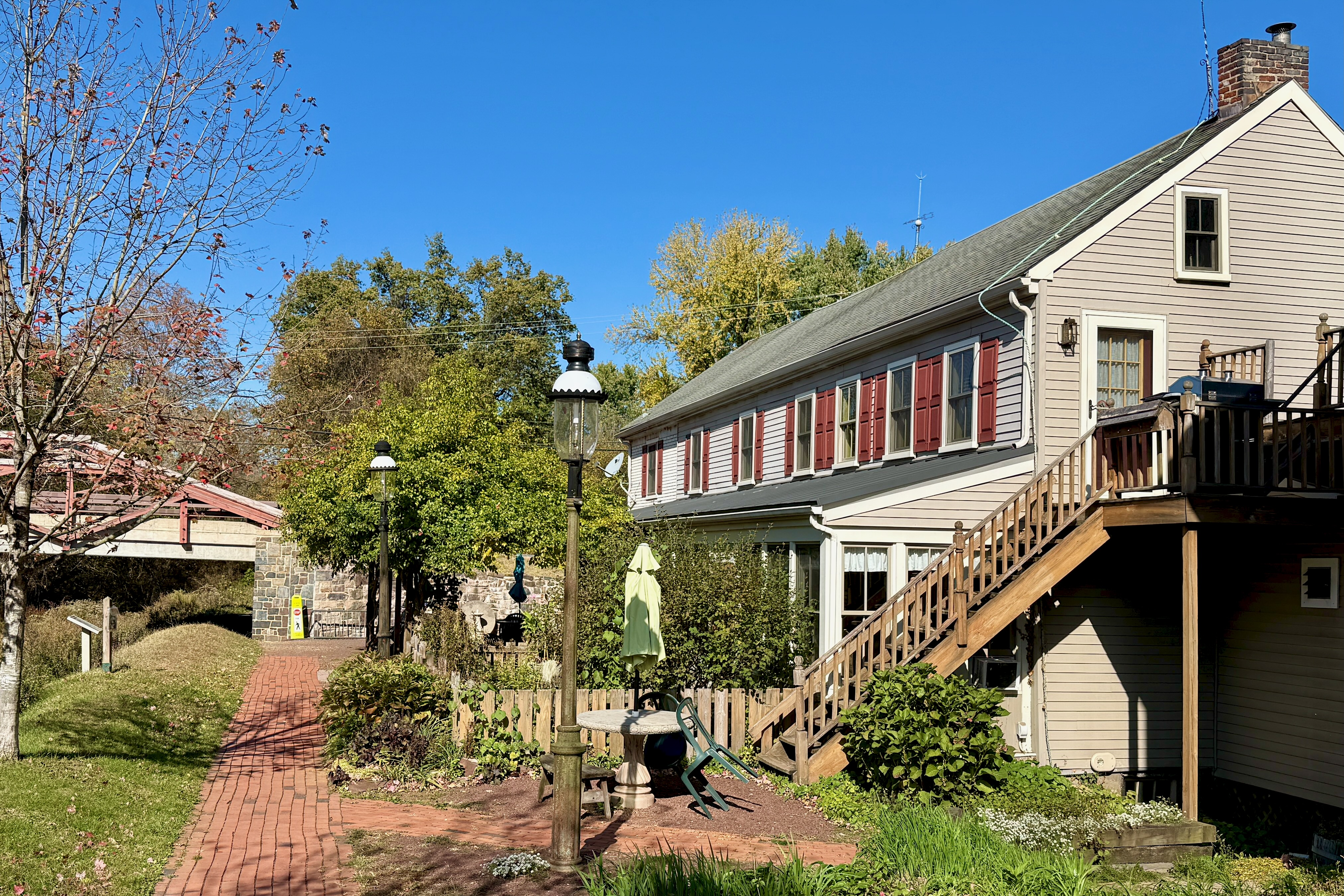
Homestead General Store along the Delaware Canal in Upper Black Eddy

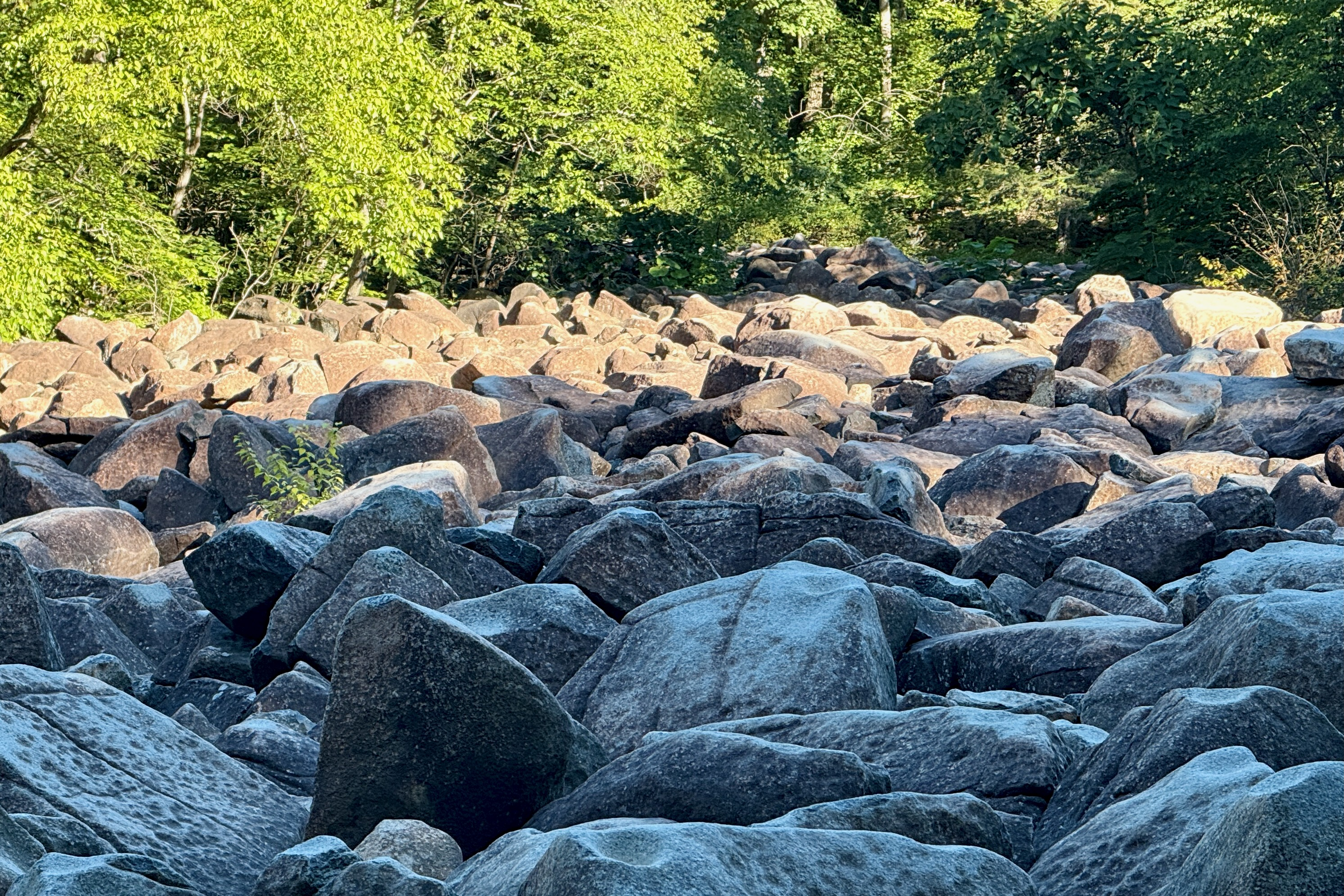
Boulder field at Ringing Rocks Park

=== Neighboring municipalities ===
- Tinicum Township (southeast)
- Nockamixon Township (southwest)
- Holland Township, New Jersey (north)

== Demographics ==
Historical population
Census	Pop.	Note	%±
1930	682		—
1940	845		23.9%
1950	944		11.7%
1960	948		0.4%
1970	1,092		15.2%
1980	1,242		13.7%
1990	1,378		11.0%
2000	1,408		2.2%
2010	1,277		−9.3%
2020	1,234		−3.4%

As of the 2010 census, the township was 96.5% White, 0.4% Black or African American, 0.1% Native American, 0.5% Asian, and 0.8% were two or more races. 1.7% of the population were of Hispanic or Latino ancestry.

As of the 2000 census, there were 1,408 people, 559 households, and 398 families residing in the township. The population density was 217.5 inhabitants per square mile (84.0/km^{2}). There were 612 housing units at an average density of 94.6 per square mile (36.5/km^{2}). The racial makeup of the township was 99.15% White, 0.43% African American, 0.07% Native American, 0.28% Asian, and 0.07% from two or more races. Hispanic or Latino of any race were 0.85% of the population.

There were 559 households, out of which 29.3% had children under the age of 18 living with them, 59.7% were married couples living together, 8.2% had a female householder with no husband present, and 28.8% were non-families. 21.3% of all households were made up of individuals, and 7.3% had someone living alone who was 65 years of age or older. The average household size was 2.52 and the average family size was 2.97.

In the township the population was spread out, with 22.4% under the age of 18, 5.8% from 18 to 24, 29.0% from 25 to 44, 29.8% from 45 to 64, and 13.0% who were 65 years of age or older. The median age was 41 years. For every 100 females, there were 99.4 males. For every 100 females age 18 and over, there were 100.9 males.

The median income for a household in the township was $52,083, and the median income for a family was $53,958. Males had a median income of $36,765 versus $29,338 for females. The per capita income for the township was $23,779. About 4.3% of families and 4.9% of the population were below the poverty line, including 8.4% of those under age 18 and 6.5% of those age 65 or over.

== Education ==
Bridgeton Township lies within the Palisades School District.

== Climate ==
According to the Köppen climate classification system, Bridgeton Twp has a Hot-summer, Humid continental climate (Dfa). Dfa climates are characterized by at least one month having an average mean temperature ≤ 32.0 °F (0.0 °C), at least four months with an average mean temperature ≥ 50.0 °F (10.0 °C), at least one month with an average mean temperature ≥ 71.6 °F (22.0 °C) and no significant precipitation difference between seasons. Although most summer days are slightly humid in Bridgeton Twp, episodes of heat and high humidity can occur with heat index values > 103 °F (39 °C). Since 1981, the highest air temperature was 101.4 °F (38.6 °C) on July 22, 2011, and the highest daily average mean dew point was 73.6 °F (23.1 °C) on August 12, 2016. The average wettest month is July, which corresponds with the annual peak in thunderstorm activity. Since 1981, the wettest calendar day was 6.66 inches (169 mm), on August 27, 2011. During the winter months, the average annual extreme minimum air temperature is −3.7 °F (−19.8 °C). Since 1981, the coldest air temperature was −14.3 °F (−25.7 °C) on January 22, 1984. Episodes of extreme cold and wind can occur, with wind chill values < −15 °F (−26 °C). The average annual snowfall (Nov-Apr) is between 30 inches (76 cm) and 36 inches (91 cm). Ice storms and large snowstorms depositing ≥ 12 inches (30 cm) of snow occur once every few years, particularly during nor’easters from December through February.

Climate data for Bridgeton Twp, Elevation 535 ft (163 m), 1981-2010 normals, extremes 1981-2018
Month	Jan	Feb	Mar	Apr	May	Jun	Jul	Aug	Sep	Oct	Nov	Dec	Year
Record high °F (°C)	69.7 (20.9)	77.9 (25.5)	86.7 (30.4)	93.3 (34.1)	94.1 (34.5)	94.6 (34.8)	101.4 (38.6)	98.7 (37.1)	96.7 (35.9)	89.1 (31.7)	79.8 (26.6)	73.8 (23.2)	101.4 (38.6)
Mean daily maximum °F (°C)	37.4 (3.0)	40.9 (4.9)	49.3 (9.6)	61.7 (16.5)	71.5 (21.9)	79.9 (26.6)	84.2 (29.0)	82.4 (28.0)	75.6 (24.2)	64.4 (18.0)	53.3 (11.8)	41.8 (5.4)	62.0 (16.7)
Daily mean °F (°C)	28.7 (−1.8)	31.4 (−0.3)	39.0 (3.9)	50.3 (10.2)	60.0 (15.6)	68.9 (20.5)	73.4 (23.0)	71.8 (22.1)	64.6 (18.1)	53.3 (11.8)	43.6 (6.4)	33.4 (0.8)	51.6 (10.9)
Mean daily minimum °F (°C)	20.0 (−6.7)	22.0 (−5.6)	28.8 (−1.8)	38.8 (3.8)	48.5 (9.2)	58.0 (14.4)	62.7 (17.1)	61.3 (16.3)	53.6 (12.0)	42.3 (5.7)	33.9 (1.1)	25.1 (−3.8)	41.3 (5.2)
Record low °F (°C)	−14.3 (−25.7)	−6.2 (−21.2)	0.2 (−17.7)	16.3 (−8.7)	31.4 (−0.3)	39.1 (3.9)	45.2 (7.3)	39.8 (4.3)	33.7 (0.9)	22.4 (−5.3)	9.4 (−12.6)	−2.9 (−19.4)	−14.3 (−25.7)
Average precipitation inches (mm)	3.48 (88)	2.82 (72)	3.77 (96)	4.16 (106)	4.30 (109)	4.35 (110)	5.02 (128)	4.08 (104)	4.46 (113)	4.42 (112)	3.76 (96)	4.06 (103)	48.68 (1,236)
Average relative humidity (%)	68.7	64.8	60.3	58.5	63.1	69.5	69.2	72.3	72.9	71.2	69.6	70.1	67.5
Average dew point °F (°C)	19.7 (−6.8)	20.9 (−6.2)	26.4 (−3.1)	36.3 (2.4)	47.4 (8.6)	58.5 (14.7)	62.7 (17.1)	62.4 (16.9)	55.7 (13.2)	44.2 (6.8)	34.3 (1.3)	24.7 (−4.1)	41.2 (5.1)
Source: PRISM

== Transportation ==
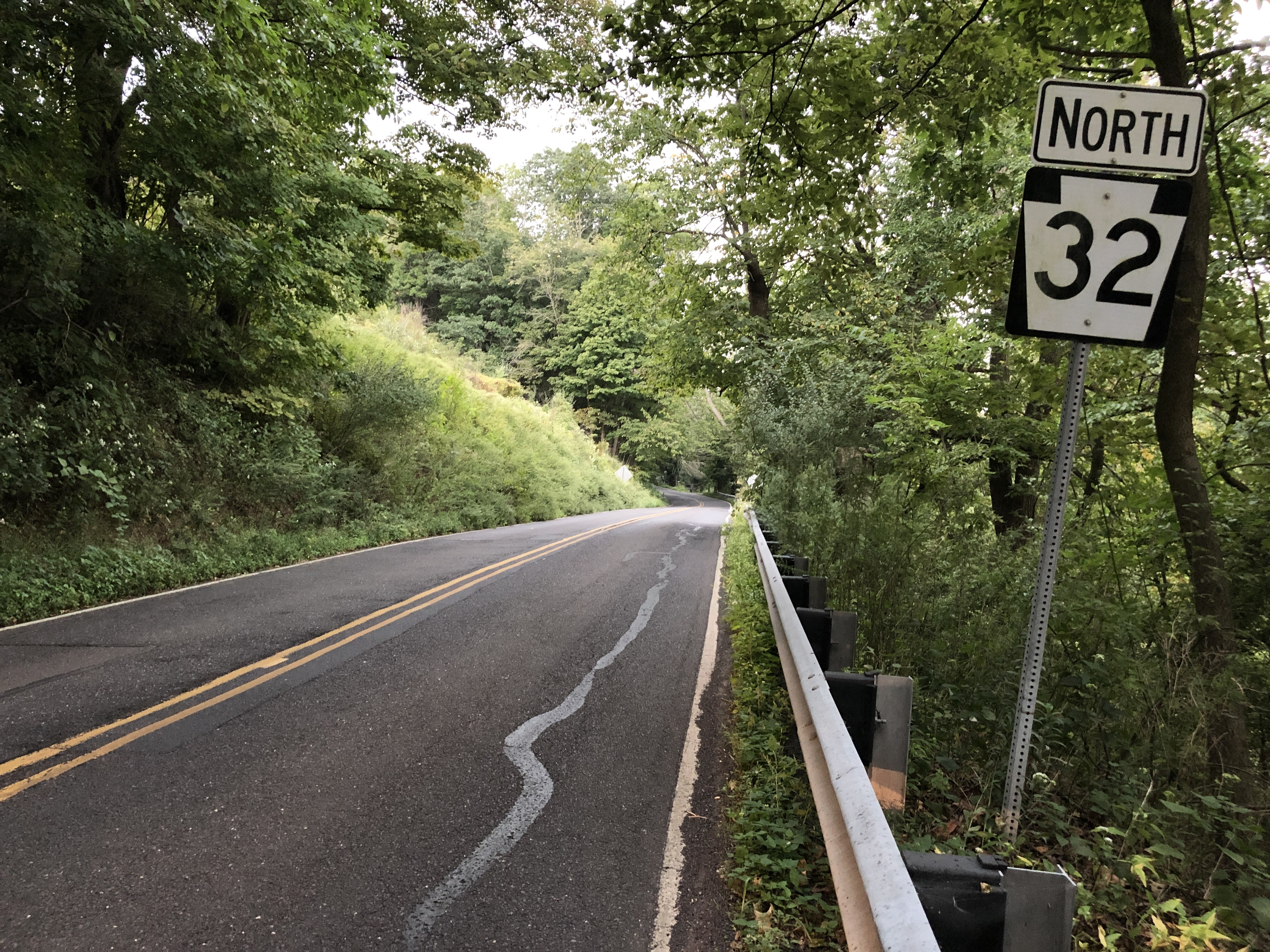
PA 32 northbound in Bridgeton Township

As of 2018 there were 17.78 miles (28.61 km) of public roads in Bridgeton Township, of which 9.23 miles (14.85 km) were maintained by the Pennsylvania Department of Transportation (PennDOT) and 8.55 miles (13.76 km) were maintained by the township.

The only numbered highway serving Bridgeton Township is Pennsylvania Route 32. It follows River Road on a northwest-to-southeast alignment parallel to the Delaware River across the northern and northeastern portions of the township.

== Ecology ==
According to the A. W. Kuchler U.S. potential natural vegetation types, Bridgeton Twp would have a dominant vegetation type of Appalachian Oak (104) with a dominant vegetation form of Eastern Hardwood Forest (25). The plant hardiness zone is 6b with an average annual extreme minimum air temperature of −3.7 °F (−19.8 °C). The spring bloom typically begins by April 15 and fall color usually peaks by October 26.
