= Cerro de la Campana =

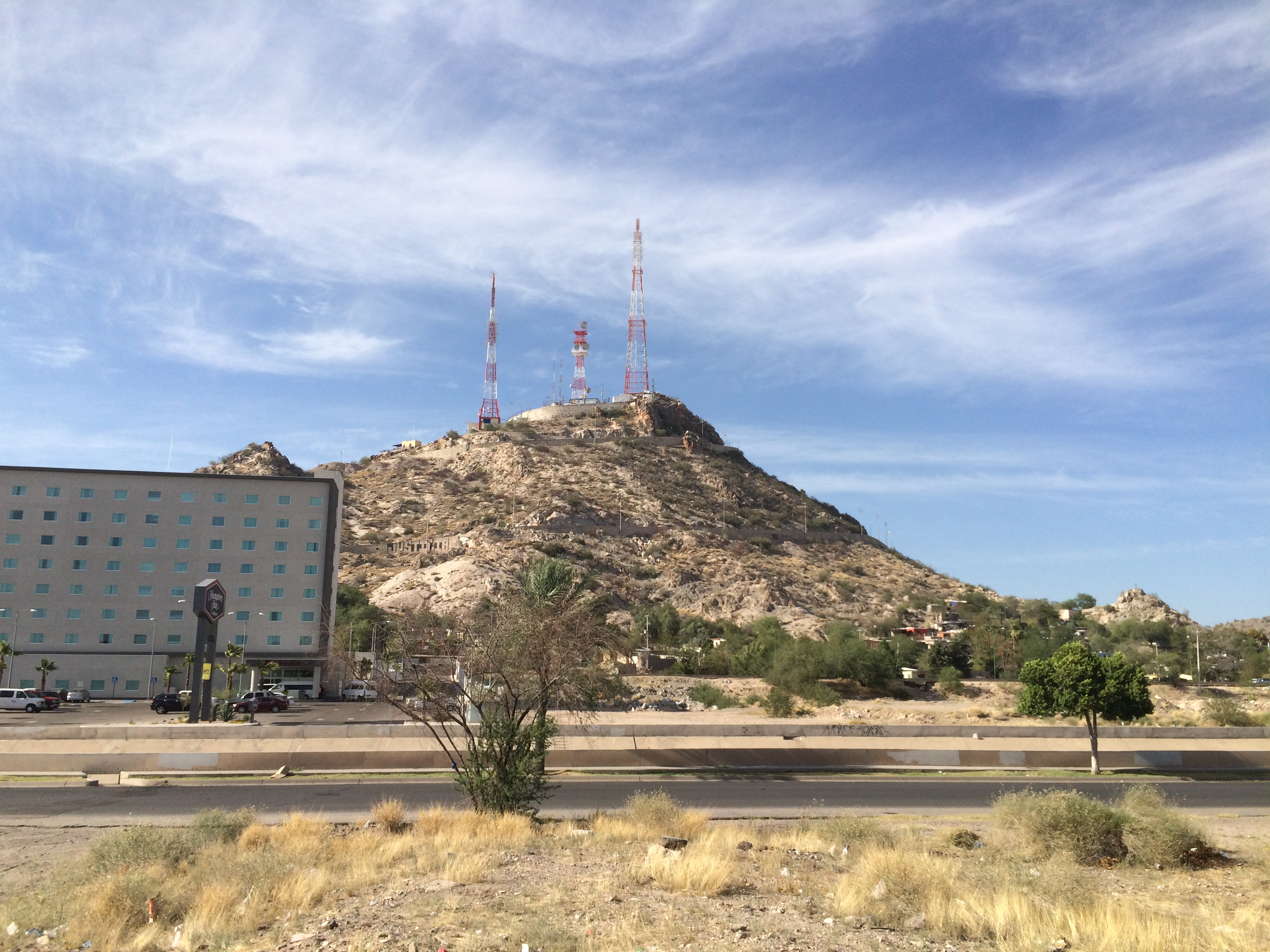
View of Cerro de la Campana

Cerro de la Campana (Bell Hill) is a rocky landform and a symbol of the city of Hermosillo, Sonora, in Mexico. This place is an excellent viewpoint for tourists, because from the rocky hilltop you can see an almost complete panoramic view of the City of the Sun (Ciudad del Sol). It was inaugurated in 1909 as the viewpoint of the city. Its name comes from its shape, which is similar to a bell as seen from the west, even though other theories prompt that its name comes from the sound similar to a bell as rocks crash on the hill.

== Location ==
Cerro de la Campana is in the center Hermosillo. The street Cucurpe takes you from the bottom of the hill to the viewpoint in the colony Cerro de la campana.

== Height ==
1048 feet (319 m)

The main streets that surround the hill are:

- Par Vial Rosales-Pino Suárez to the west.
- No Reelección Avenue to the north.
- California Street to the east, and
- Boulevard Serna to the south.

There are other streets that are closer, but because they are hard to access and shorter, it is hard to go around the hill effectively.
