= Doylestown Historic District =

Historic district in Pennsylvania, United States

- U.S. National Register of Historic Places
- U.S. Historic district
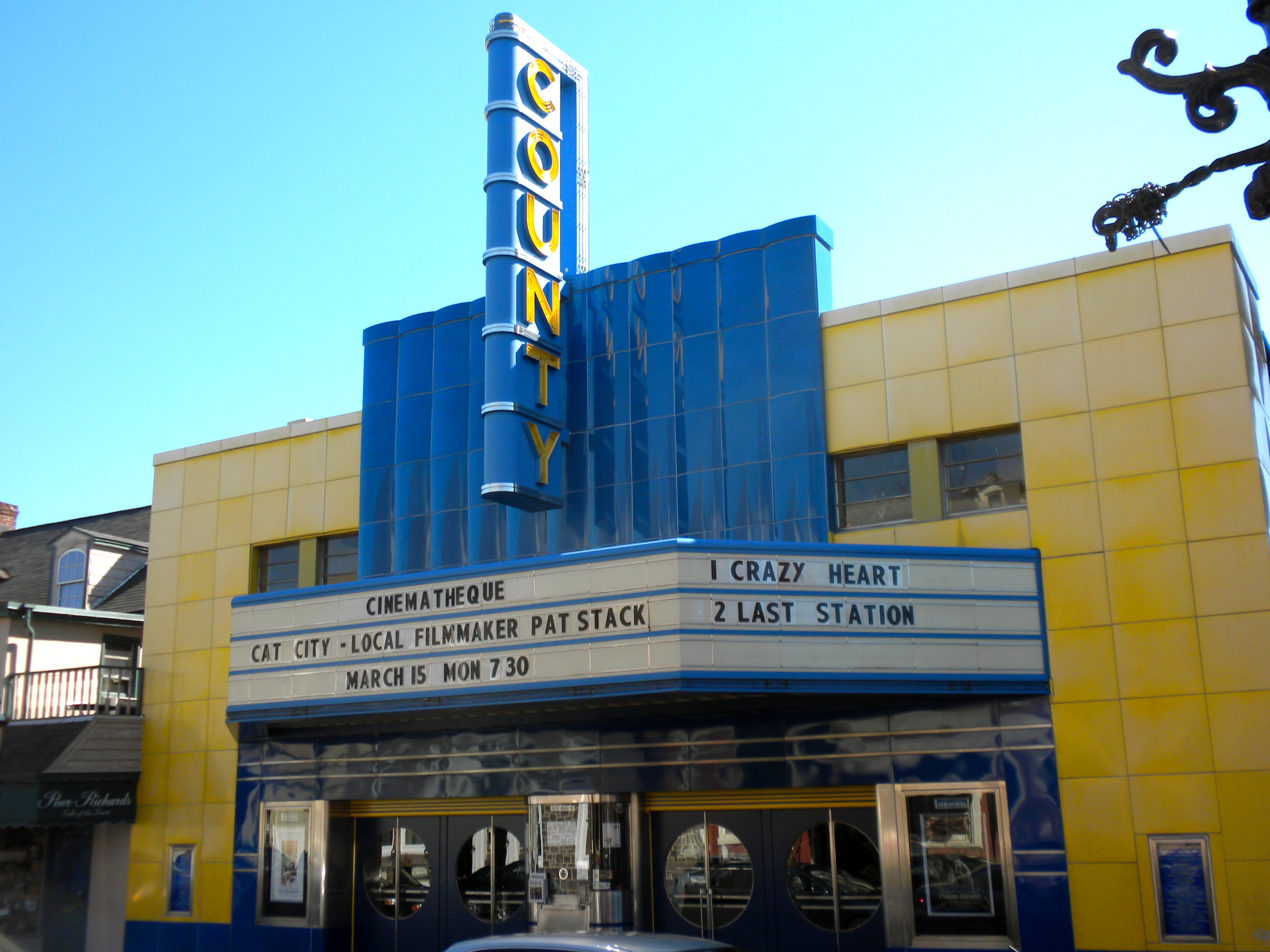
- County Cinema, Doylestown Historic District, March 2010

- Location within Pennsylvania Location within the United States
- Location: Roughly bounded by Union, Cottage and E. Ashland Sts, Hillside Ave. and S. and N. West Sts., Doylestown, Pennsylvania
- Coordinates: 40°18′35″N 75°08′14″W
- Area: 206 acres (83 ha)
- Architect: Multiple
- Architectural style: Late 19th And 20th Century Revivals, Late Victorian, Federal
- NRHP reference No.: 85001012
- Added to NRHP: May 10, 1985

The Doylestown Historic District is a national historic district located in Doylestown, Bucks County, Pennsylvania. The district is composed of one thousand fifty-five contributing buildings in the central business district and surrounding residential areas of Doylestown, including a variety of residential, commercial, industrial, and institutional buildings and notable examples of Late Victorian and Federal style architecture.

Notable buildings include the Intelligencer Building (1876), Lenape Hall (1874), Hart Bank (1850), County Jail (1885), Henry Lear House (1875), Charles E. Meyers House (1887), John Barclay House (1814), Meredith Shaw Mansion (c. 1812), and Shive's Hardware Store (c. 1833).

Located in the district and separately listed are the Fountain House, James-Lorah House, Mercer Museum (1916), Pugh Dungan House, and Shaw Historic District.

It was added to the National Register of Historic Places in 1985.
