= Shaw Historic District =

Shaw Historic District may refer to:

- Shaw Historic District, Doylestown, Pennsylvania, on the NRHP
- Shaw (Washington, D.C.) (Shaw Historic District), Washington, D.C.
