= Henry Chapman (American politician) =

American politician

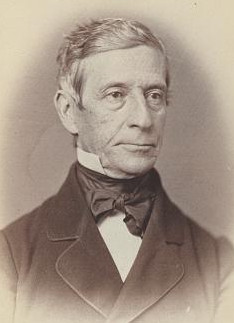

Member of the U.S. House of Representatives from Pennsylvania's 7th district
- In office March 4, 1857 – March 3, 1859
- Preceded by: Samuel C. Bradshaw
- Succeeded by: Henry C. Longnecker

Personal details
- Born: February 4, 1804 Newtown, Pennsylvania, US
- Died: April 11, 1891 (aged 87) Doylestown, Pennsylvania, US
- Party: Democratic

Henry Chapman (February 4, 1804 – April 11, 1891) was an American politician from Pennsylvania who served as a Democratic member of the U.S. House of Representatives for Pennsylvania's 7th congressional district from 1857 to 1859.

== Biography and career ==
Henry Chapman was born in Newtown, Pennsylvania, the son of Abraham Chapman, a lawyer, and Elizabeth Meredith, the daughter of a lawyer. He attended Doylestown Academy and Doctor Gummere's private boys' school near Burlington, New Jersey. He studied law, was admitted to the bar in 1825 and commenced practice in Doylestown. He served as a member of the Pennsylvania State Senate for the 6th district from 1843 to 1846. He was a judge of the fifteenth judicial district from 1845 to 1849.

Chapman was elected as a Democrat to the Thirty-fifth Congress. He declined to be a candidate for renomination in 1858. He served as judge of the Bucks County Court in 1861. He retired in 1871. He died at "Frosterley," near Doylestown, Pennsylvania.

In 1844, he built the James-Lorah House, listed on the National Register of Historic Places in 1972.

== Personal life and family ==
Chapman's first wife was Rebecca Stewart. Their children were Elizabeth, Mary Rebecca, Henry A., and Thomas Stewart. Elizabeth married the diplomat Colonel Timothy Bigelow Lawrence, son of the extremely wealthy Abbott Lawrence. Mary Rebecca married William Robert Mercer, son of Colonel John Francis Mercer, son of former Maryland governor John Francis Mercer. Upon Lawrence's early death, the childless Elizabeth inherited and moved in with the Mercer family, lavishly supporting their children, especially Henry Chapman Mercer who became her travelling companion.

Chapman's second wife was Nancy Findlay Shunk, daughter of Governor Francis R. Shunk and Jane, who herself was the daughter of Governor William Findlay. Their children were Fanny and Arthur. Nancy's sister Elizabeth married Congressman Charles Brown, their children included a future state Attorney General Francis Shunk Brown.

The two half-sisters, Elizabeth and Fanny, would be the role models for Madeleine Lee and Sybil Ross in the Henry Adams novel Democracy. James Michener, who grew up as next-door neighbors to the Mercers in Doylestown, claims Elizabeth "can be taken as the prototype for many of [Henry James'] heroines." A similar claim has been made about Michener's novels also.

Pennsylvania State Senate
Preceded by William Hiester	Member of the Pennsylvania Senate, 6th district 1843-1846	Succeeded by Josiah Rich
U.S. House of Representatives
Preceded by Samuel Carey Bradshaw	Member of the U.S. House of Representatives from Pennsylvania's 7th congressional district 1857–1859	Succeeded by Henry Clay Longnecker
