= Oscar Hammerstein II Farm =

Historic house in Pennsylvania, United States

- U.S. National Register of Historic Places
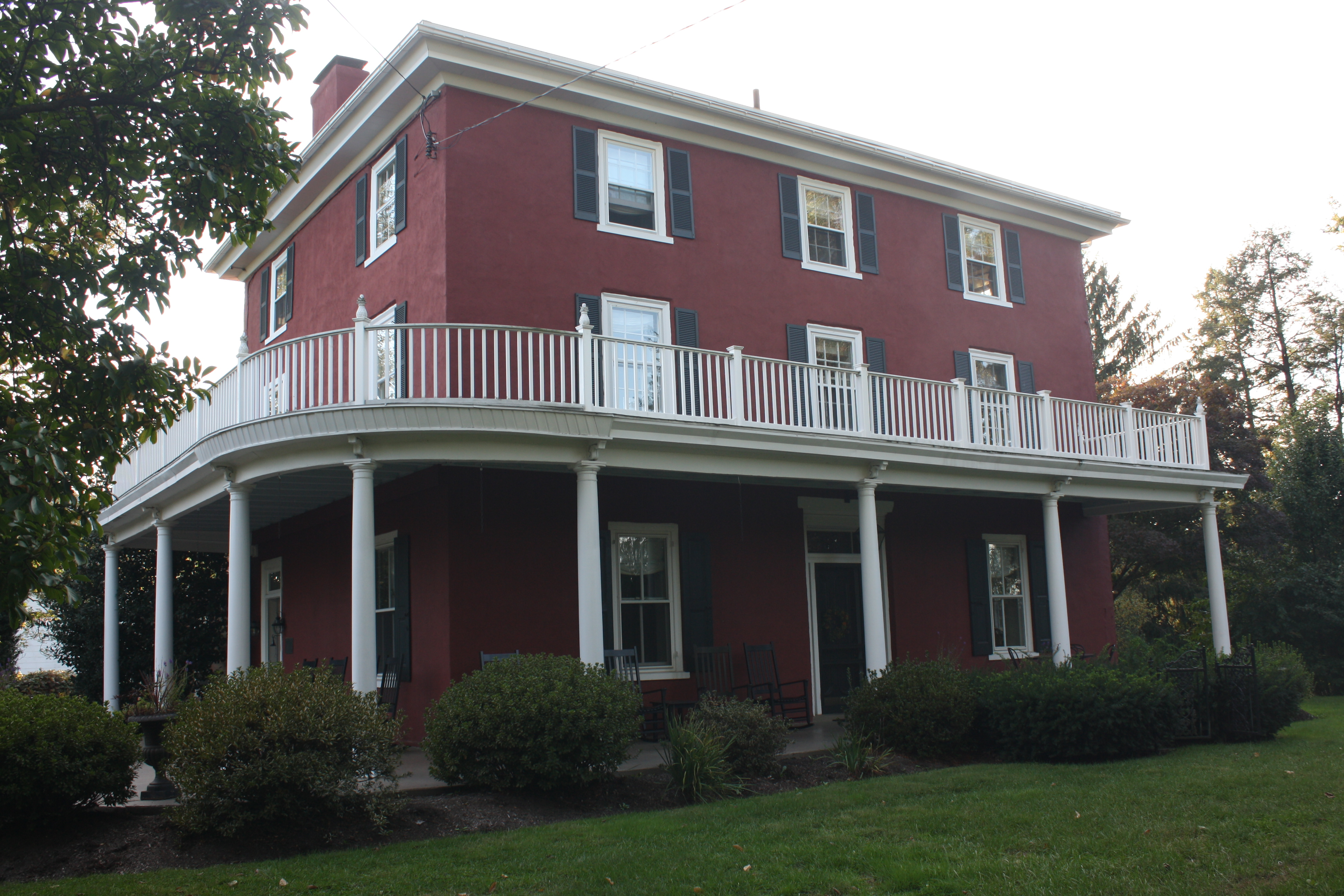
- Oscar Hammerstein II Farmhouse, October 2012

- Location within Pennsylvania Location within the United States
- Location: 70 East Rd., Doylestown, Pennsylvania
- Coordinates: 40°18′35″N 75°6′45″W
- Area: 4.9 acres (2.0 ha)
- NRHP reference No.: 88002374
- Added to NRHP: November 17, 1988

The Oscar Hammerstein II Farm, also known as the Highland Farm, is an historic home and farm complex that is located in Doylestown Township, Bucks County, Pennsylvania.

It was added to the National Register of Historic Places in 1988.

== History and architectural features ==
The farmhouse was built in 1840, and is a three-story, three-bay, stuccoed masonry residence with a hipped roof. It features a one-story wraparound porch. A decorative balustrade was added in 1954. Also located on the property is a contributing bank barn.

Lyricist Oscar Hammerstein II (1895–1960) purchased the farm in 1940 and died there on August 23, 1960.
