= Benjamin Markley Boyer =

American politician (1823-1887)

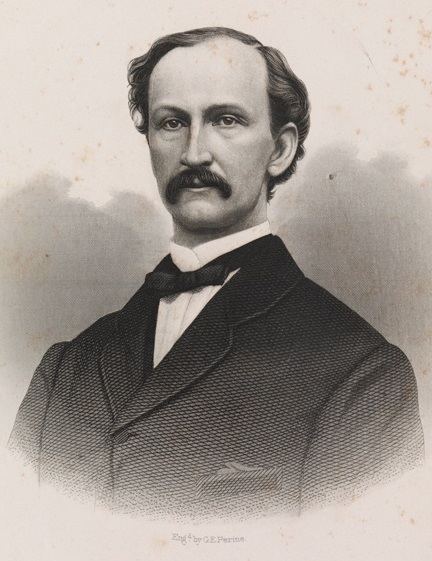

Member of the U.S. House of Representatives from Pennsylvania's 6th district
- In office March 4, 1865 – March 3, 1869
- Preceded by: John D. Stiles
- Succeeded by: John D. Stiles

Personal details
- Born: January 22, 1823 New Hanover Township, Pennsylvania, U.S.
- Died: August 16, 1887 (aged 64) Norristown, Pennsylvania, U.S.
- Resting place: West Laurel Hill Cemetery, Bala Cynwyd, Pennsylvania, U.S.
- Party: Whig; Democratic

Benjamin Markley Boyer (January 22, 1823 – August 16, 1887) was an American politician who served as a Democratic member of the U.S. House of Representatives for Pennsylvania's 6th congressional district from 1865 to 1869. He served as president judge of the Montgomery County Court from 1882 to 1887.

== Early life and education ==
Boyer was born on January 22, 1823, in New Hanover Township, Pennsylvania, and was raised and attended elementary school in Pottstown, Pennsylvania. In 1836, he entered Lafayette College in Easton, Pennsylvania. He transferred to Marshall College and then to University of Pennsylvania where he graduated in 1841. He studied law in Carlisle, Pennsylvania, and was admitted to the bar in 1844. During the American Civil War, he served as captain of the 41st Pennsylvania militia, a company of volunteers established when Pennsylvania was invaded by confederate troops. He received an A.M. degree from Lafayette College in 1866.

== Career ==
He returned to Montgomery County, Pennsylvania, and began the practice of law. He served as deputy attorney general of Montgomery County from 1848 to 1850. He began his political career as a Whig, but switched to the Democratic party in 1856. In 1864 he was elected a Representative from Pennsylvania to the Thirty-Ninth Congress as a Democrat, and was re-elected to the Fortieth Congress. He made several passionate speeches against the Republican plans for reconstruction of the South after the American Civil War. He was not a candidate for renomination in 1868.

In 1866 he accepted stocks from Thomas Durant in the early stages of the Crédit Mobilier scandal. He was elected president judge of Montgomery County Court in 1882. He died on August 16, 1887, in Norristown, Pennsylvania, and was interred at West Laurel Hill Cemetery in Bala Cynwyd, Pennsylvania.

== Personal life ==
He married Eleanor Pryor and together they had two children.

== Publications ==
- Relief of the Famishing Poor of the South and Southwest. Speeches of Hon. Benjamin M. Boyer, of Pennsylvania, Hon. J.A. Bingham, of Ohio, Hon. Samuel J. Randall, of Pennsylvania, and Hon. Ignatius Donnelly, of Minnesota. House of Representatives, March 13, 1867, Washington: Congressional Globe Office, 1867
- Report of the Select Committee on the New Orleans Riots, Washington: Government Printing Office, 1867

U.S. House of Representatives
| Preceded by John D. Stiles | Member of the U.S. House of Representatives from Pennsylvania's 6th congressional district 1865–1869 | Succeeded by John D. Stiles |
