= Thomas Buchecker Cooper =

American politician (1823–1862)

Member of the U.S. House of Representatives from Pennsylvania's 7th district
- In office March 4, 1861 – April 4, 1862
- Preceded by: Henry C. Longnecker
- Succeeded by: John D. Stiles

Personal details
- Born: December 29, 1823 Coopersburg, Pennsylvania
- Died: April 4, 1862 (aged 38)
- Party: Democratic

Thomas Buchecker Cooper (December 29, 1823 – April 4, 1862) was a Democratic member of the U.S. House of Representatives from Pennsylvania.

Thomas B. Cooper was born in Coopersburg, Pennsylvania. He attended the public schools and Pennsylvania College at Gettysburg, Pennsylvania. He graduated from the medical department of the University of Pennsylvania at Philadelphia in 1843 and commenced practice in Coopersburg.

Cooper was elected as a Democrat to the Thirty-seventh Congress and served until his death in Coopersburg in 1862. Interment is in Woodland Cemetery.

== See also ==
- List of members of the United States Congress who died in office (1790–1899)

== Sources ==
- United States Congress. "Thomas Buchecker Cooper (id: C000763)". Biographical Directory of the United States Congress.
- The Political Graveyard

U.S. House of Representatives
Preceded by Henry Clay Longnecker	Member of the U.S. House of Representatives from Pennsylvania's 7th congressional district 1861–1862	Succeeded by John Dodson Stiles
