= Henry Clay Longnecker =

American politician

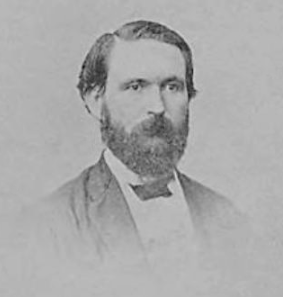

Member of the U.S. House of Representatives from Pennsylvania
- In office March 4, 1859 – March 3, 1861
- Preceded by: Henry Chapman
- Succeeded by: Thomas B. Cooper

Personal details
- Born: April 17, 1820 Lower Allen Township, Pennsylvania, U.S.
- Died: September 16, 1871 (aged 51) Allentown, Pennsylvania, U.S.
- Party: Republican

Henry Clay Longnecker (April 17, 1820 – September 16, 1871) was a Republican member of the U.S. House of Representatives from Pennsylvania.

== Early life ==
Longnecker was born in Allen Township, Pennsylvania. He graduated from the Norwich Military Academy in Vermont and from Lafayette College in Easton, Pennsylvania. He studied law, was admitted to the bar and practiced in Easton.

He served during the Mexican–American War as first lieutenant, captain, and adjutant in all principal engagements under General Winfield Scott. He was wounded at the Battle of Chapultepec on September 13, 1847. He returned to Pennsylvania, and served as district attorney of Lehigh County, Pennsylvania, from 1848 to 1850.

Longnecker was elected as a Republican to the Thirty-sixth Congress. During the American Civil War, Longnecker participated in organizing Pennsylvania troops and served in the Union Army as colonel of the Fifth Regiment, Pennsylvania Volunteers. He resumed the practice of his profession in Allentown, Pennsylvania, in 1865. He served as associate judge of Lehigh County in 1867. He died in Allentown on September 16, 1871, and was interred in Fairview Cemetery.

U.S. House of Representatives
| Preceded by Henry Chapman | Member of the U.S. House of Representatives from Pennsylvania's 7th congressional district 1859–1861 | Succeeded by Thomas B. Cooper |
