= Doylestown Airport =

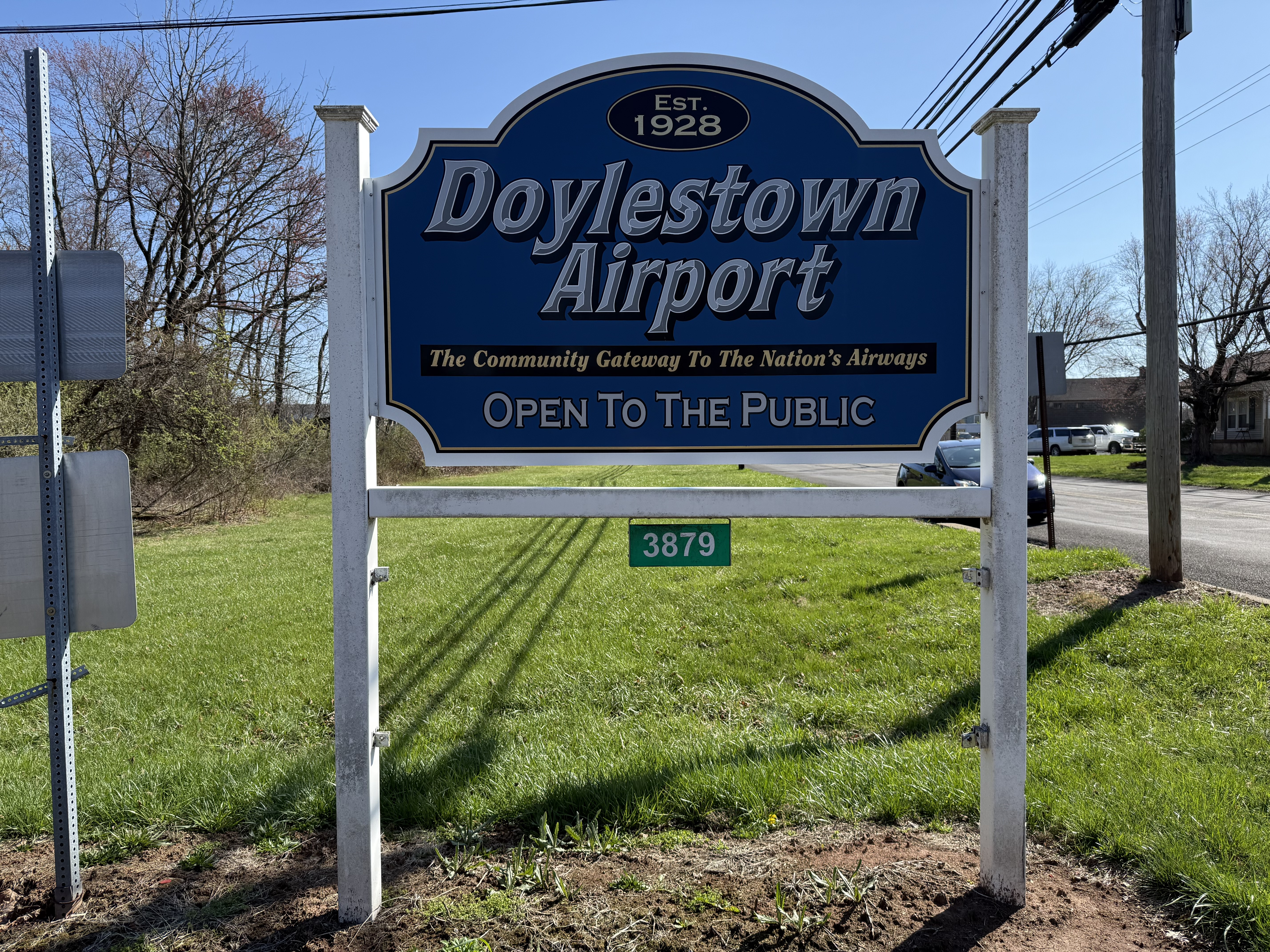
- IATA: DYL; ICAO: KDYL; FAA LID: DYL

Summary
- Airport type: Public
- Owner: Bucks County Airport Authority (BCAA)
- Operator: Leading Edge Aviation
- Serves: Doylestown, Pennsylvania, U.S.
- Location: Buckingham Township, Bucks County, Pennsylvania
- Built: 05/1942
- Elevation AMSL: 393.7 ft (120.0 m)
- Coordinates: 40°19′59″N 75°07′19″W
- Website: https://www.doylestownairport.com/

Map
- Location of Doylestown Airport in Pennsylvania DYL (the United States)

Runways
Direction	Length		Surface
Direction	ft	m	Surface
5/23	3,002	915	Asphalt

Statistics (2022)
- Aircraft operations: avg 72,635
- Aircraft based on field: 136
- Source: https://www.airnav.com/airport/kdyl

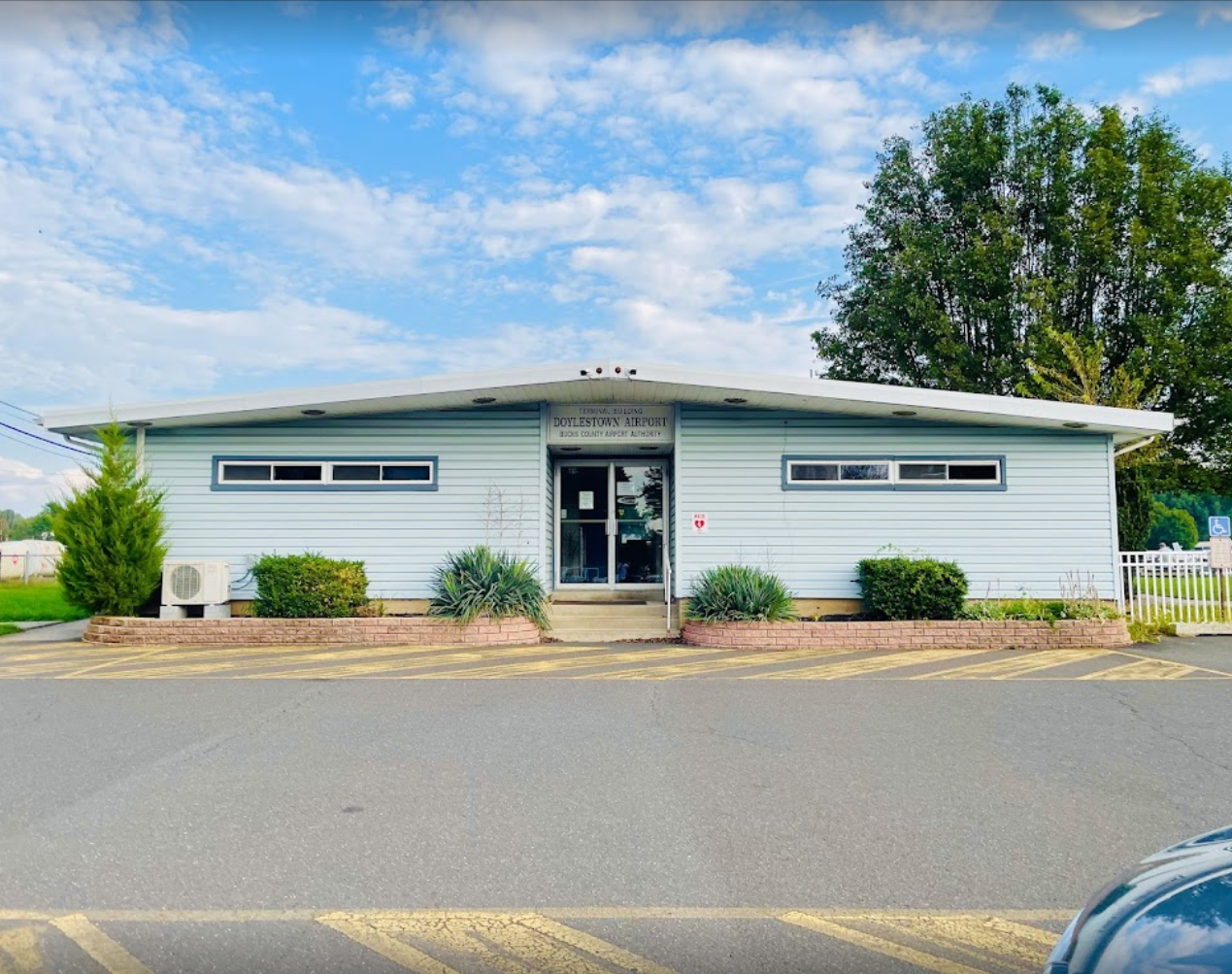
Leading Edge Aviation (FBO) building

Doylestown Airport (IATA: DYL, ICAO: KDYL, FAA LID: DYL) is a public airport in Buckingham Township, Bucks County, Pennsylvania, owned by the Bucks County Airport Authority (BCAA). It is two nautical miles north of Doylestown, Pennsylvania and has a single fixed-base operator, Leading Edge Aviation, Civil Air Patrol squadron 907, flight training, and aircraft rentals.

== History ==
The airport was founded in May 1942 as a dual use airport and farm. Between 1957 and 1960, the airport was converted from a pig farm that was owned and managed by John Van Sant, a popular aviator in Pennsylvania and founder of the Van Sant Airport. John Van Sant led the development of Vansant airport after the Bucks County Airport Authority purchase of Doylestown Airport in 1962. The airport has been continually managed by the Bucks County Airport Authority (BCAA).

== Facilities ==
Doylestown Airport covers 200 acres (81 ha) at an elevation of 394 feet (120 m) above mean sea level. Its one runway, 5/23, is asphalt 3,002 by 60 feet (916 x 18 m).

As of 27 January 2022, the airport had an average of 72,635 aircraft operations per year, 119 per day: 69% local general aviation, 24% transient general aviation, 7% air taxi and <1% military. 136 aircraft are based at the airport: 122 single-engine, 11 multi-engine, 2 helicopter, and 1 glider.

== Expansion proposals ==
In 2017, commissioners voted unanimously in favor to secure a $660,000 loan to the Bucks County Airport Authority. The airport will be borrowing funs to purchase property adjacent to the airport in Buckingham, containing wooded land and a barn. A chairman stated the county is looking to add a terminal and additional parking in this space.

== See also ==
- List of airports in Pennsylvania
