= Samuel Carey Bradshaw =

American politician

Member of the U.S. House of Representatives from Pennsylvania's 7th district
- In office March 4, 1855 – March 3, 1857
- Preceded by: Samuel A. Bridges
- Succeeded by: Henry Chapman

Personal details
- Born: June 10, 1809 Plumstead, Pennsylvania
- Died: June 9, 1872 (aged 62)
- Party: Whig

Samuel Carey Bradshaw (June 10, 1809 – June 9, 1872) was a Whig Party member of the U.S. House of Representatives from Pennsylvania.

Samuel Carey Bradshaw was born in Plumstead, Pennsylvania. He attended the public schools, graduated from the University of Pennsylvania School of Medicine in 1833 and practiced in Quakertown, Pennsylvania.

Bradshaw was elected as an Whig candidate to the Thirty-fourth Congress. He was an unsuccessful candidate for reelection in 1856. He died in Quakertown in 1872. Interment in Friends Burial Ground.

== Sources ==
- United States Congress. "Samuel Carey Bradshaw (id: B000751)". Biographical Directory of the United States Congress.
- The Political Graveyard

U.S. House of Representatives
Preceded by Samuel A. Bridges	Member of the U.S. House of Representatives from Pennsylvania's 7th congressional district 1855–1857	Succeeded by Henry Chapman
