= Doylestown, Pennsylvania =

Borough in Pennsylvania, US

- Borough
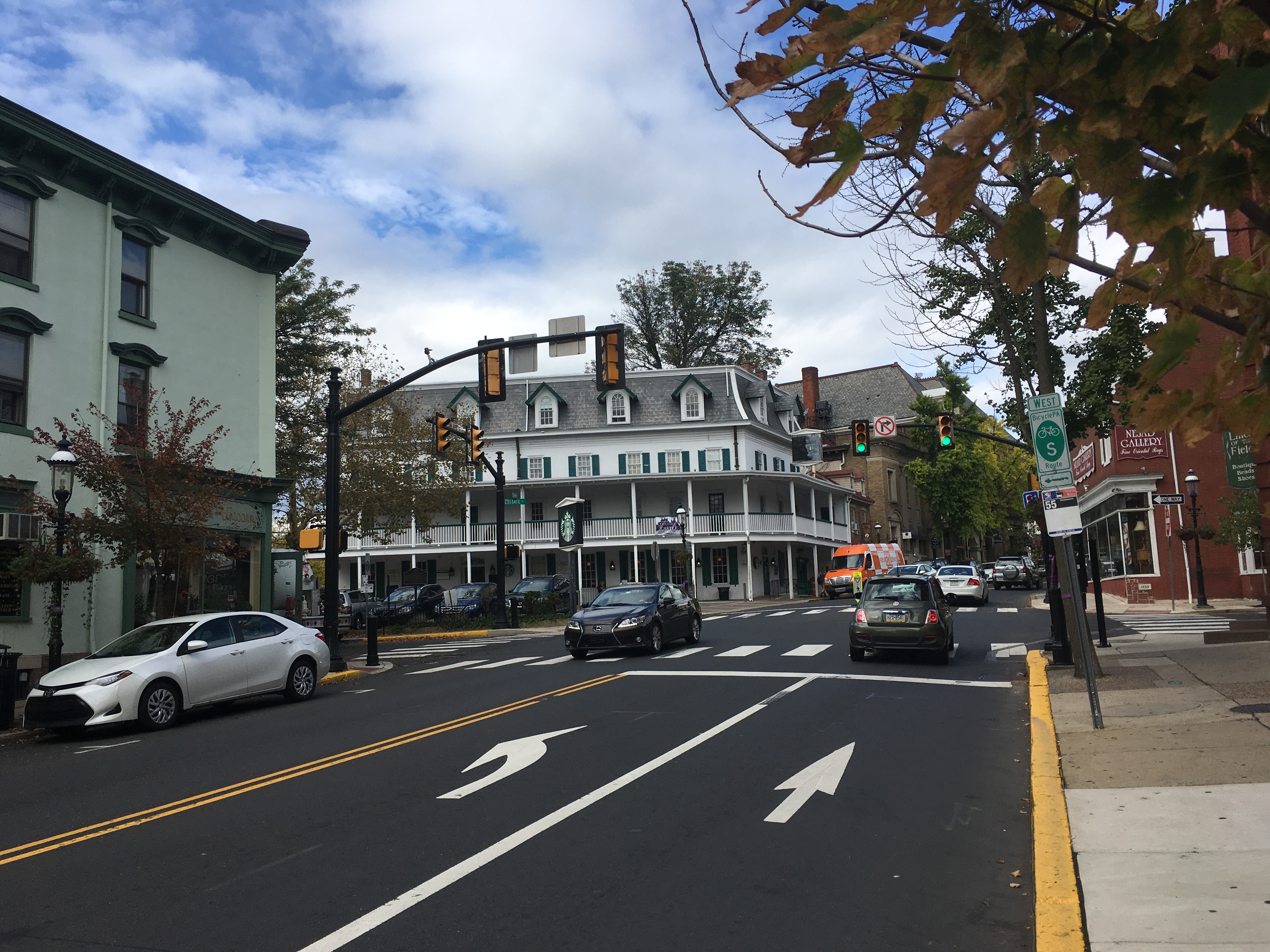
- Main Street in Doylestown in October 2017

- Flag Seal
- Etymology: William Doyle
- Location of Doylestown in Bucks County, Pennsylvania

- Location in Pennsylvania Location in the United States
- Coordinates: 40°18′46″N 75°07′44″W
- Country: United States
- State: Pennsylvania
- County: Bucks
- Founded: 1745
- Incorporated as a borough: 1838

Government
  - Type: Council-manager
  - Mayor: Noni West (D)

Area
  - Total: 2.16 sq mi (5.59 km^{2})
  - Land: 2.16 sq mi (5.59 km^{2})
  - Water: 0 sq mi (0.00 km^{2})
- Elevation: 456 ft (139 m)

Population (2020)
  - Total: 8,300
  - Density: 3,847.6/sq mi (1,485.56/km^{2})
- Time zone: UTC−5 (Eastern (EST))
  - Summer (DST): UTC−4 (EDT)
- ZIP Codes: 18901–18902
- Area codes: 215, 267, and 445
- FIPS code: 42-19784
- Website: www.doylestownborough.net

Doylestown is a borough and the county seat of Bucks County, Pennsylvania, United States. As of the 2020 census, the population was 8,300. Known for its preserved historic downtown and concentration of cultural institutions, it is a prominent part of Bucks County and a historic town within the Philadelphia metropolitan area. In 2019, Doylestown was named the Best Small-Town Cultural Scene in America by USA Today readers.

Doylestown is home to three museums, including the James A. Michener Art Museum, which hosts exhibitions by artists such as Keith Haring (2022) and Eric Carle (2026), and houses a major collection of Pennsylvania Impressionist art. The "Mercer Mile", a one-mile span, comprises three early 20th-century structures built by archaeologist Henry Chapman Mercer: the Mercer Museum, Fonthill Castle, and the Moravian Pottery and Tile Works.

Doylestown has connections to American theater, music, film, and literature. Oscar Hammerstein II wrote The Sound of Music, Oklahoma!, and South Pacific while living in the area, where he mentored Stephen Sondheim, who wrote West Side Story. James A. Michener wrote Tales of the South Pacific nearby. The borough is home to the County Theater, a restored 1930s Art Deco cinema specializing in independent and foreign films.

The borough is served by the Central Bucks School District, recognized for academic performance, and by Doylestown Hospital, part of Penn Medicine. Its downtown includes independently owned restaurants and retail establishments. The area is connected to parks and multi-use trails in the surrounding region.

Doylestown is located in southeastern Pennsylvania, approximately 25 miles (40 km) north of Philadelphia and 65 miles (105 km) southwest of New York City, within the Philadelphia metropolitan area.

== History ==
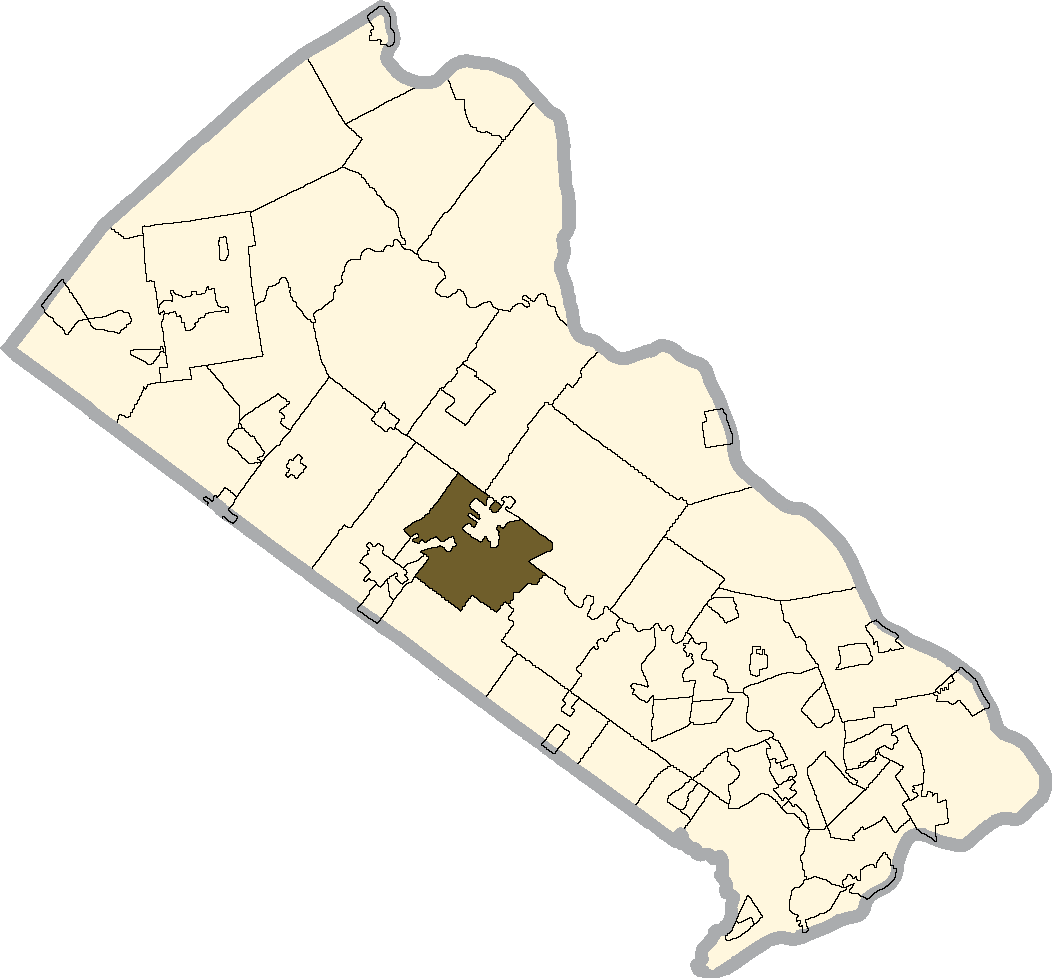
Map of the Doylestown Township inside Bucks County

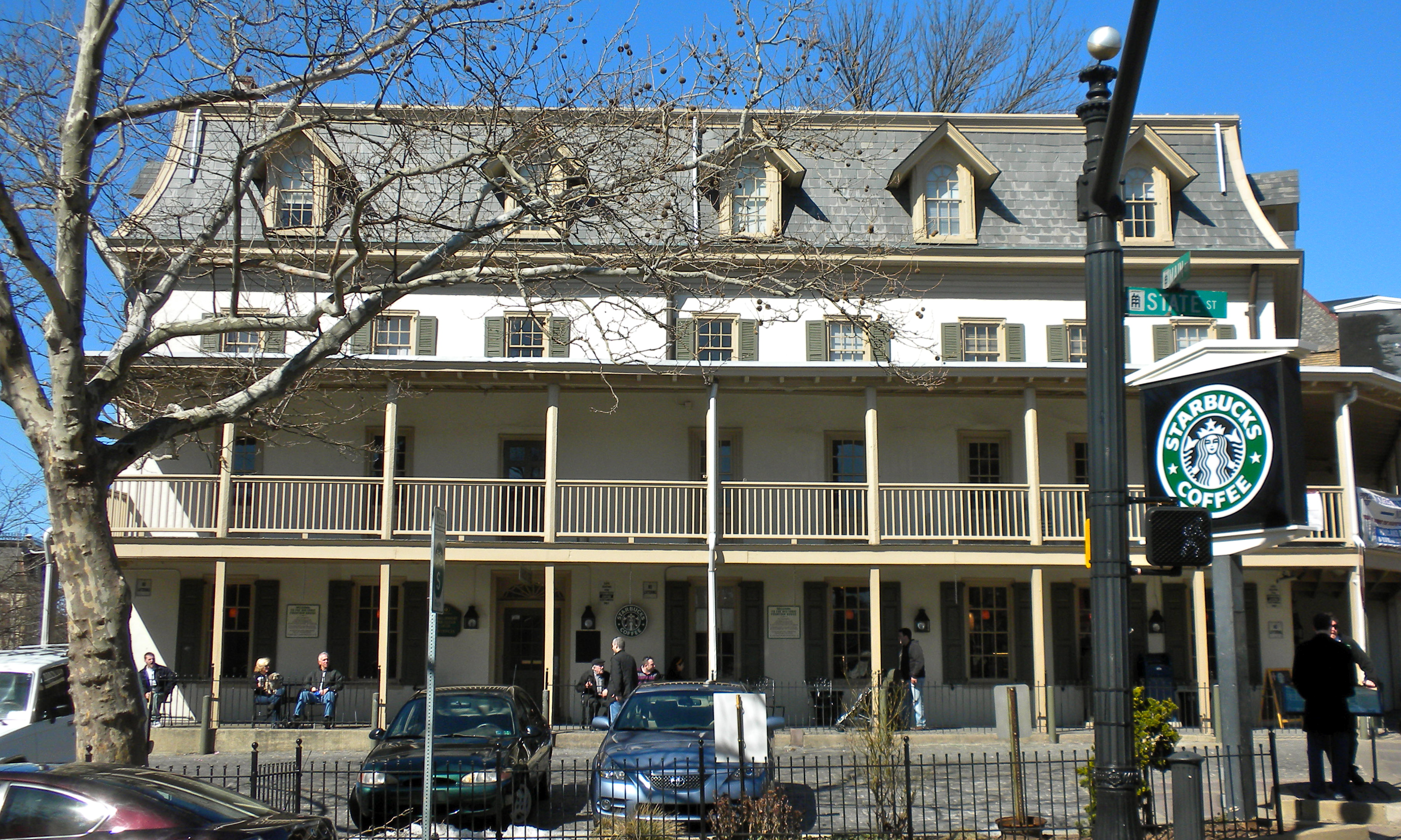
The Fountain House, at the corner of State and Main Streets, was built in 1758 and is on the National Register of Historic Places.

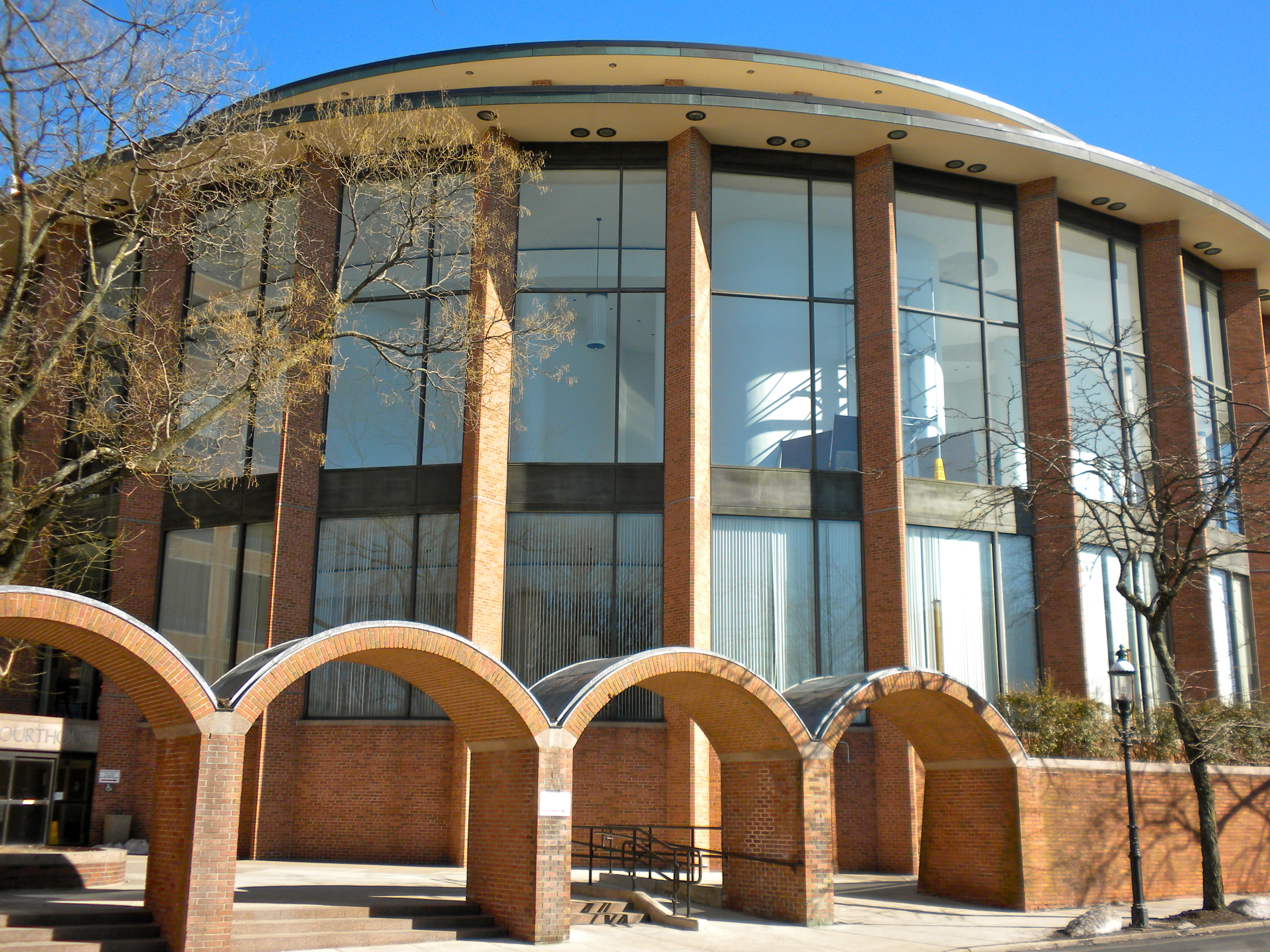
The Bucks County Administration Building

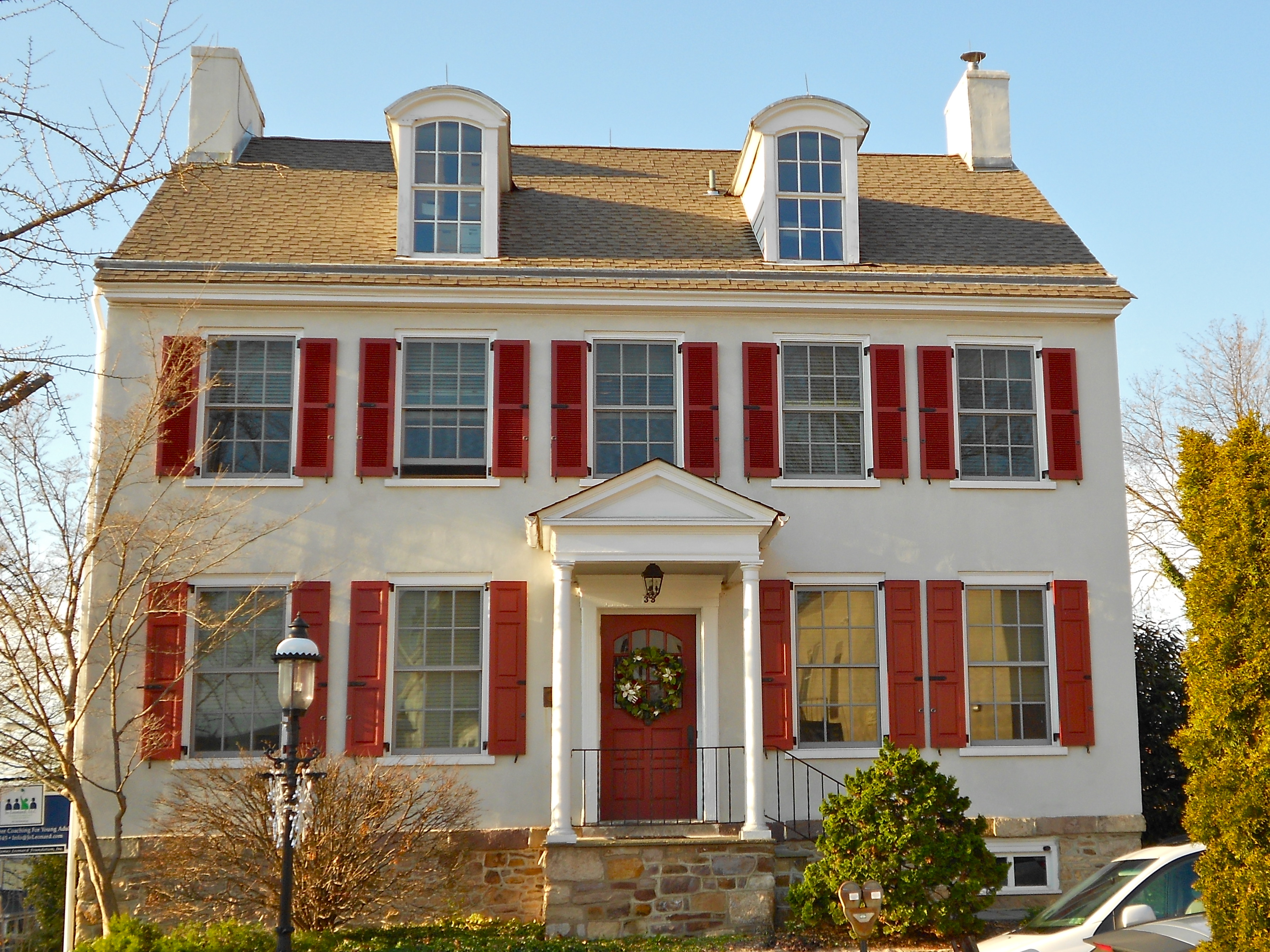
Pugh Dungan House

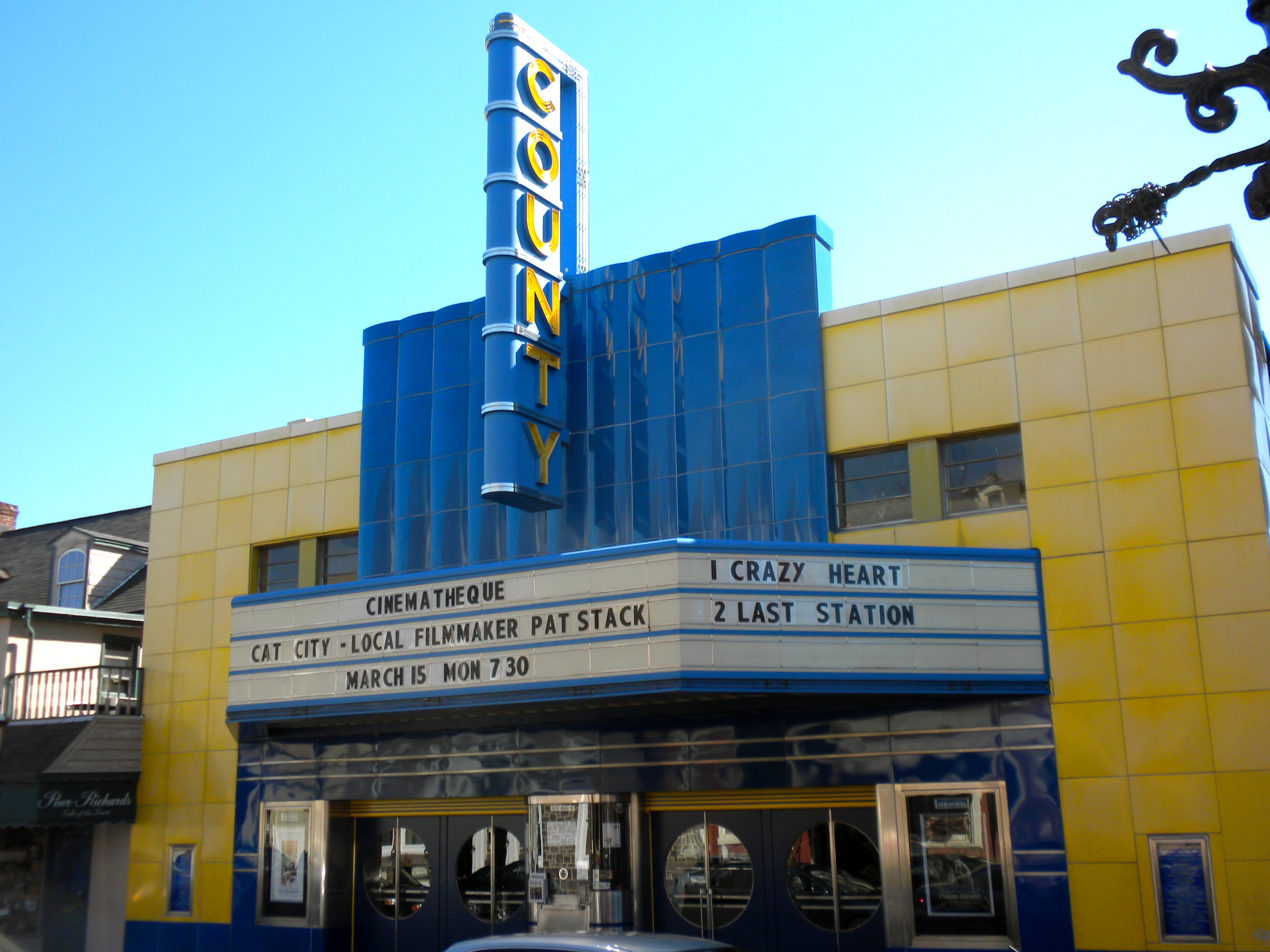
Doylestown Historic District

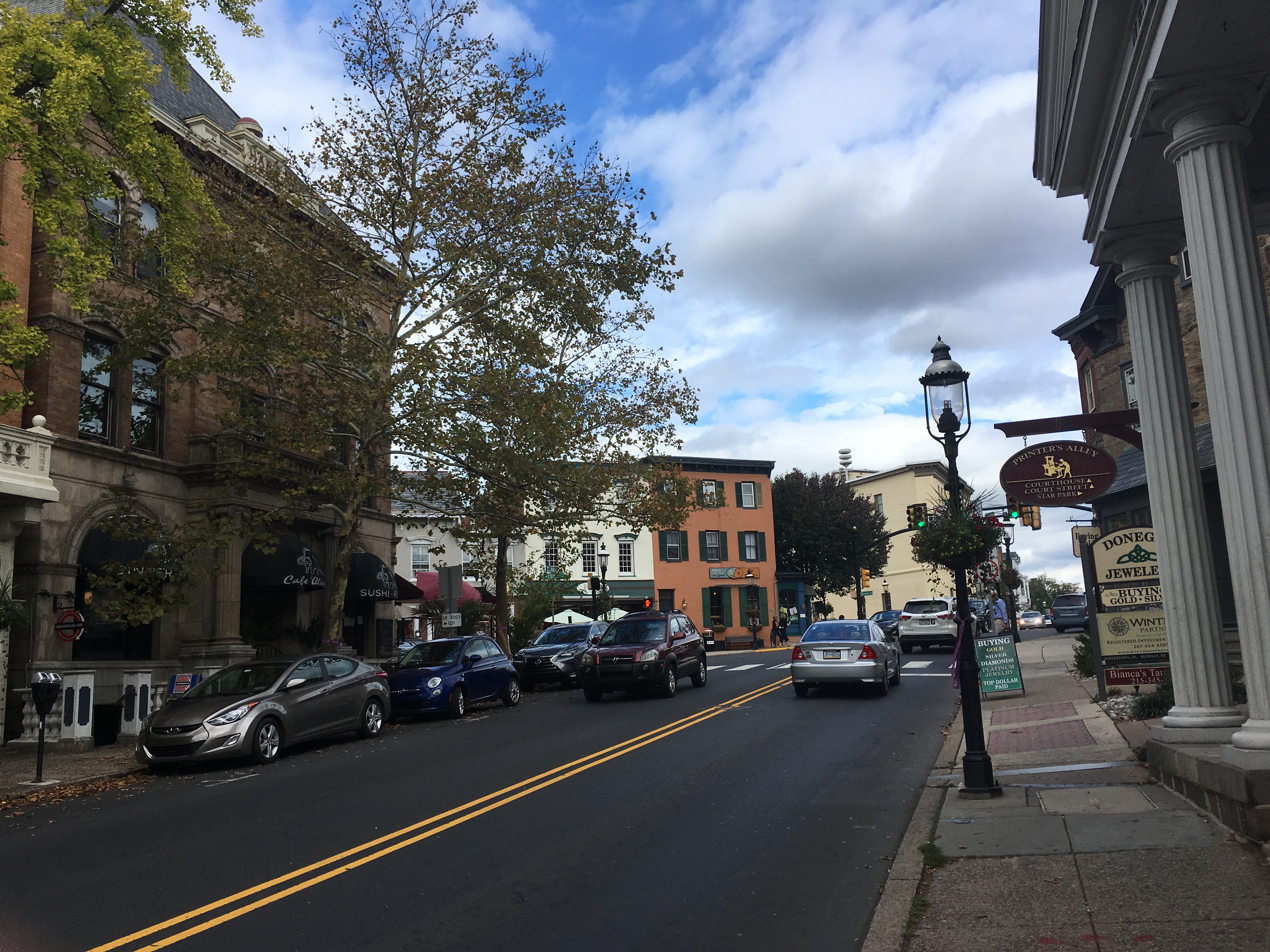
Main Street

Like most of eastern Pennsylvania, present-day Doylestown was inhabited by the Lenape people prior to European settlement. The Lenape, who called the region Lenapehoking, lived along the waterways of the Delaware Valley for thousands of years before William Penn began colonizing Pennsylvania in 1681. European settlers arrived in the area in the early 18th century, drawn by the fertile land of central Bucks County and the crossroads that would become Doylestown's defining geographic feature.

=== 18th century ===
In March 1745, William Doyle, an Irish settler, obtained a license to build a tavern, then known as William Doyle's Tavern, on what is now the northwest corner of Dyers Road and Coryell's Ferry Road at present-day Main and State Streets. The tavern's strategic location at the junction of present-day U.S. Route 202, which links Norristown and New Hope, and Pennsylvania Route 611, which links Philadelphia and Easton, contributed to Doylestown's early growth.

A second inn, named Sign of the Ship, was established in 1774, built diagonally across from the Doyle Tavern. Samuel Flack was innkeeper in 1778.

=== 19th century ===
On January 1, 1802, a post office was established in present-day Doylestown. Charles Stewart, the first postmaster, carried letters to recipients in the bell-shaped crown of his high beaver hat as he walked about the village. When Stewart died on February 7, 1804, his son-in-law Enoch Harvey became the next postmaster. On October 9, 1804 Harvey advertised in the Pennsylvania Correspondent, published in Doylestown, of a list of letters remaining in the post office for Wm. R. Hanna, Esq., Newtown; Doct. Felix Robertson, Bucks County; Robert Wehir, Shamony, Bucks County; Robert A. Farmer, Esq., Birdsborough; Israel Childs, Buckingham.

In 1815, the first church was erected; it was followed by the construction of a succession of churches for various congregations throughout the 19th century.

As the population of Central and Upper Bucks County grew throughout the 18th and into the 19th century, discontent developed with the county seat's location in Newtown, where it had been since 1725. Eight petitions with a total of 184 signers were submitted to the General Assembly, some as early as 1784, requesting the move of the county seat to Doylestown. Among the signers were Andrew Armstrong, John Armstrong, John Davis, Andrew Denison, Jesse Fell, Joseph Fell, John Ingham (of Ingham Springs), Michael Frederick Kolb, Zebulon M. Pike (of Lumberton), Samuel Preston, Robert Shewell, Walter Shewell, and Fulkerd Sebring.

The Pennsylvania General Assembly approved the move by an Act on February 28, 1810, and the first Court session was opened on May 11, 1813. An outgrowth of Doylestown's new courthouse was the development of "lawyers row", a collection of Federal-style offices. One positive consequence of early 19th-century investment in the new county seat was organized fire protection, which began in 1825 with the Doylestown Fire Engine Company.

A bill to erect Doylestown into a borough was introduced into Legislature in February 1830, but failed, as well as a second attempt in the session of 1832. "An Act to erect the Village of Doylestown, in the County of Bucks, into a Borough" was passed and signed into law by Governor Joseph Ritner on April 16, 1838.

An electric telegraph station was built in 1846, and the North Pennsylvania Railroad completed a branch to Doylestown in 1856. The first gas lights were introduced in 1854. Because of the town's relatively high elevation and a lack of strong water power, substantial industrial development never occurred and Doylestown evolved to have a professional and residential character.

During the mid-19th century, several large tracts located east of the courthouse area were subdivided into neighborhoods. The next significant wave of development occurred after the Civil War, when the 30-acre (12 ha) Magill property to the southwest of the town's core was subdivided for residential lots.

In 1869, Doylestown established a water works. The first telephone line arrived in 1878, the same year that a new courthouse was erected. 1897 saw the first of several trolley lines connecting Doylestown with Willow Grove, Newtown, and Easton. A private sewer system and treatment plant were authorized in 1903. The borough took over and expanded sewer service to about three-quarters of the town in 1921.

=== 20th century ===
In the early 20th century, Doylestown became best known to the outside world through the "Tools of the Nation-Maker" museum of the Bucks County Historical Society. Henry Chapman Mercer constructed the reinforced concrete building in 1916 to house his collection of mechanical tools and utensils. Upon his death in 1930, Mercer also left his similarly constructed home Fonthill and adjacent Moravian Pottery and Tile Works, to be operated as a museum. The home was left on the condition that his housekeeper be allowed to live there for the rest of her life. She lived there and gave tours until the mid-1970s.

In 1916, Doylestown Country Club was established and still operates a private golf course and caddy program.

By 1931, the advent of the automobile and improved highway service had put the last trolley line out of business as Doylestonians used the automobile as the primary means of travel within the region. The Great Depression took its toll on Doylestown; many grand old houses constructed a century earlier fell into disrepair. During the 1930s, the borough also expanded its land area to the north by admission of the tract known as the Doylestown Annex.

In the decade following World War II, however, Doylestown's business community boomed. During the 1940s, streets were paved for the first time in two decades and parking meters were introduced downtown in 1948. However, the postwar housing boom did not begin in earnest until the 1950s, when 550 new homes were built. The housing boom continued into the 1960s and 1970s, as more than 1,600 new homes were built during those decades and the borough's population grew from 5,917 in 1960 to 8,717 in 1980.

By the 1960s, the competition presented by the emergence of shopping malls proved detrimental to many local Doylestown businesses, resulting in vacant buildings and dilapidated storefronts. Bucks County Redevelopment Authority responded with a federal urban renewal scheme that called for the demolition of 27 historic buildings. The local business community objected to such wholesale clearance and responded with its own plan called Operation '64, the Doylestown Plan for Self-Help Downtown Renewal. This private initiative was successful in saving Doylestown's old buildings and historic character, while improving business at the same time. One historic landmark that could not be saved was the 80-year-old courthouse and clock tower, which was replaced by the present county complex in the early 1960s.

By the end of the 1980s, the downtown business district was again showing the toll of massive new competition from the latest wave of suburban shopping centers, as well as the recession that hit hardest in the northeastern states. In response, the borough council established a volunteer group of civic-minded representatives from business organizations, government, and the residential community to begin formulating plans for the downtown area in 1992. This effort resulted in streetscape improvements composed of cast iron street lamps and brick pavers, façade improvements and other beautification efforts, and the establishment of a Main Street Manager Program.

In the 1990s, the downtown area rebuilt itself largely by turning to an out-of-town audience. Doylestown had long been respected as a bucolic tourist destination. The gentry of Philadelphia and New York City, including figures associated with theater and literary in Manhattan, maintained country estates in the area and often summered in Doylestown. The Mercer Museum, Moravian Pottery and Tile Works, and the local National Shrine of Our Lady of Czestochowa brought a regular stream of short-term visitors through the area as well.

With charitable support, the County Theater, an art-deco-styled building, was restored and reopened showing art-house fare, and a new main library and art museum were built around the ruins of the old stone jail, across the street from the Mercer Museum. Doylestown also was designated an official resort town and was exempted from liquor license caps. Empty commercial spaces soon began to be replaced with dense and vibrant bars and restaurants, contributing to a lively nightlife in Doylestown.

As the Philadelphia metropolitan area expanded from southern into central Bucks County, the fields and farms of the communities around Doylestown quickly began to sprout housing developments. This development brought thousands of people to the area, but the neighborhoods created often lacked longstanding institutions or discernible centers. Doylestown, more centrally located than the Delaware River border town of New Hope, which had traditionally served this function, was able to position itself as the regional center of culture and nightlife.

Archival collection and community programming are two functions of the Doylestown Historical Society, established in 1995, whose mission is "to commemorate and preserve the history of Doylestown so that its people, places and events may long be remembered."

The Doylestown Historic District, Pugh Dungan House, Fonthill, Fountain House, Oscar Hammerstein II Farm, James-Lorah House, Mercer Museum, Moravian Pottery and Tile Works, and Shaw Historic District are listed on the National Register of Historic Places.

== Geography ==
Doylestown is located 20 miles (32 km) northwest of Trenton, 25 miles (40 km) north of Center City Philadelphia, 27 miles (43 km) southeast of Allentown, and 65 miles (105 km) southwest of New York City. It is part of the Philadelphia metropolitan area. Many cultural institutions, parks, and landmarks commonly associated with Doylestown are located in the adjacent Doylestown Township; the two municipalities share a postal address, school district, and community identity.

According to the U.S. Census Bureau, Doylestown Borough has a total land area of 2.2 square miles (5.7 km^{2}). Doylestown Borough is bordered by Doylestown Township, except to the northeast where it borders Buckingham Township.

Natural features of Doylestown Borough include Cooks Run and Neshaminy Creek.

== Points of interest ==
=== Museums and cultural institutions ===
- Mercer Museum
- James A. Michener Art Museum
- Moravian Pottery and Tile Works (in Doylestown Township, Pennsylvania)
- Fonthill Castle (in Doylestown Township, Pennsylvania)

=== Historic sites ===
- The Fountain House
- Doylestown Historic District
- Oscar Hammerstein II Farm (in Doylestown Township)
- Pearl S. Buck House (in Hilltown Township)

=== Parks ===
The Borough of Doylestown owns and maintains eleven municipal parks spanning more than 80 acres.

Some area parks:

- Burpee Park
- Chapman Park
- Veterans Memorial Park
- Broad Commons Park
- Peace Valley Park (New Britain Township)
- Central Park and Kids Castle (Doylestown Township)

=== Historic religious congregations ===
- National Shrine of Our Lady of Czestochowa
- Doylestown Friends Meetinghouse (est. 1836)
- Our Lady of Mount Carmel Roman Catholic Church (est. 1850)
- Doylestown Presbyterian Church (est. 1815)
- St. Paul's Episcopal Church (est. 1846)
- Salem United Church of Christ (est. 1861)

== Economy ==
Doylestown's economy is anchored by professional services, healthcare, education, tourism, and small businesses. As the county seat of Bucks County, it serves as a regional hub for government, legal, and administrative services; Bucks County government employs nearly 2,400 people with its administrative center in Doylestown. The borough's largest employment sectors are educational services, retail trade, and management occupations, with employment growing 2.64% between 2023 and 2024.

Because of its distance from the Delaware River, Doylestown did not experience the industrialization that transformed many Pennsylvania boroughs in the 19th and 20th centuries, and has remained a largely residential and professional community. Its location within commuting distance of both Philadelphia and the New Jersey pharmaceutical corridor has made it a residential destination for professionals in the life sciences, finance, and technology sectors. The Pennsylvania Biotechnology Center on Swamp Road in Doylestown Township, described by Chemical & Engineering News as a hub of the "Doylestown Corridor," has attracted biotech startups and researchers displaced from larger pharmaceutical companies in the region, including alumni of Merck & Co., Johnson & Johnson, and other major firms. The average commute time for Doylestown residents is 24.4 minutes, reflecting a workforce that commutes regionally while living in the borough.

The downtown business district supports a concentration of locally owned retail shops, restaurants, and cultural institutions. In 2001, the National Trust for Historic Preservation named Doylestown one of America's Dozen Distinctive Destinations, and in 2024 the borough was recognized as the Best Downtown/Main Street in Bucks County by the Bucks County Herald. Cultural tourism is a significant economic driver, with the Mercer Museum, James A. Michener Art Museum, Fonthill Castle, and Moravian Pottery and Tile Works drawing visitors from the broader Philadelphia metropolitan area. The James A. Michener Art Museum alone welcomes more than 135,000 visitors annually.

== Education ==
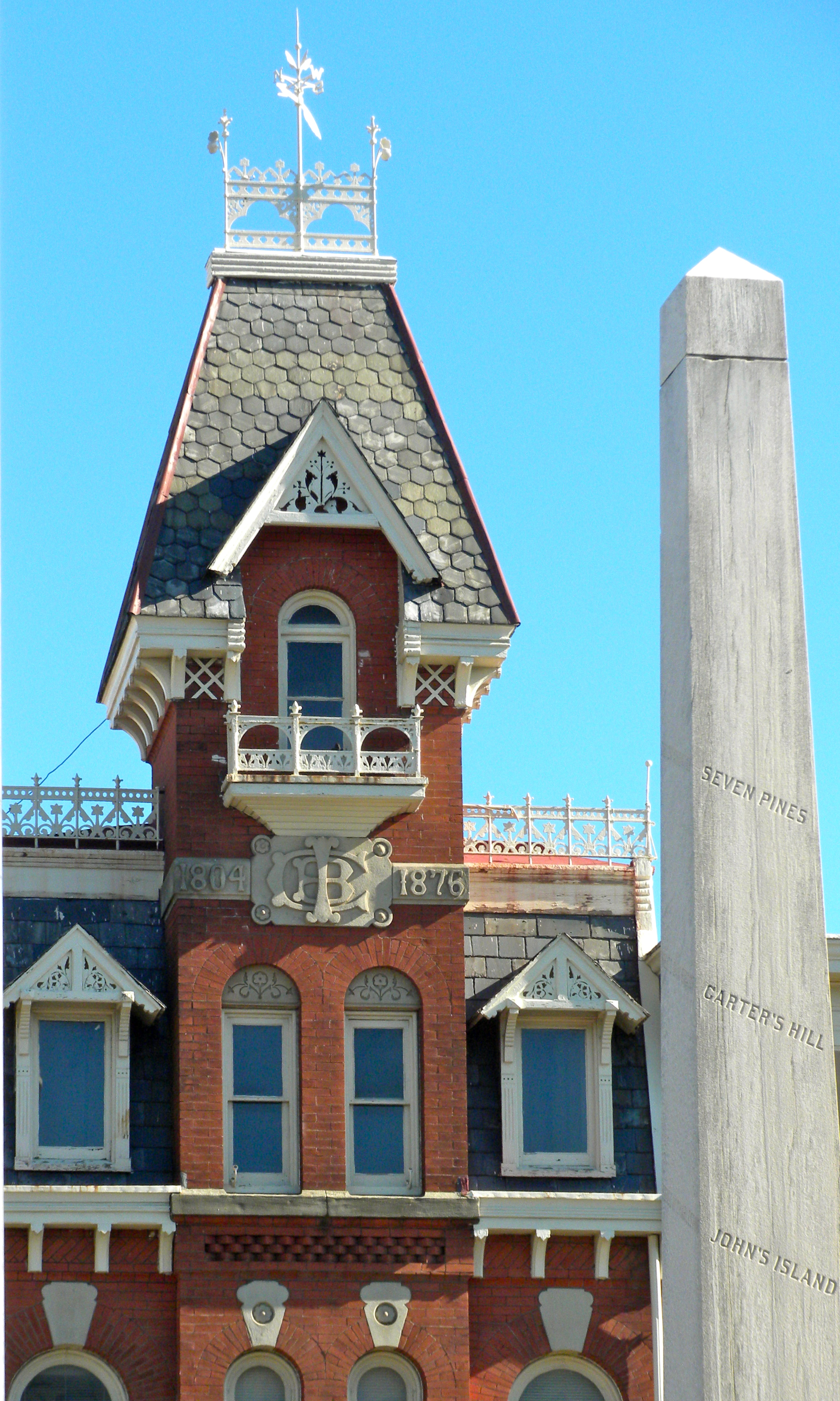
Downtown Doylestown

Doylestown Borough is served by the Central Bucks School District.

This borough is zoned to the following schools:

High schools

The municipality is divided between the zones of:

- Central Bucks High School West (areas south of Swamp Road, the majority of the municipality)
- Central Bucks High School East (areas north of Swamp Road)

Middle schools

The municipality is divided between the zones of:

- Lenape Middle School (areas south of Swamp Road, the majority of the municipality)
- Holicong Middle School (areas north of Swamp Road)

Elementary schools

The municipality is divided between the zones of:

- Doyle Elementary School
- Linden Elementary School

== Higher education ==
Delaware Valley University (DelVal), a private university founded in 1896 as the National Farm School, has a Doylestown postal address but is located primarily in Doylestown Township. Its 570-acre campus enrolls approximately 1,900 students and offers more than 28 undergraduate majors, 12 master's programs, and a doctoral program across three schools: the School of Agriculture and Environmental Science, the School of Business, Arts and Sciences, and the School of Graduate and Professional Studies. The university was founded by Reform rabbi Joseph Krauskopf, who was inspired by conversations with Leo Tolstoy to train Jewish immigrants as farmers, and gained university status in 2015. Nearly 35 percent of students participate in varsity athletics; the university competes in NCAA Division III in the Middle Atlantic Conference, fielding teams in football, lacrosse, soccer, basketball, and other sports. The university operates Kids U!, a summer youth program now in its twelfth year serving children ages 5 to 14 with weekly camps in STEM, animal science, performing arts, coding, and sports, as well as Inspire U!, a program for teens ages 14 to 18. The campus hosts public lectures, concerts, and community events throughout the academic year.

=== Climate ===
According to the Köppen climate classification system, Doylestown has a hot-summer, humid continental climate (Dfa). Dfa climates are characterized by at least one month having an average mean temperature ≤ 32.0 °F (0.0 °C), at least four months with an average mean temperature ≥ 50.0 °F (10.0 °C), at least one month with an average mean temperature ≥ 71.6 °F (22.0 °C) and no significant precipitation difference between seasons. Although most summer days are slightly humid in Doylestown, episodes of heat and high humidity can occur with heat index values > 105 °F (41 °C). Since 1981, the highest air temperature was 102.8 °F (39.3 °C) on July 22, 2011, and the highest daily average mean dew point was 75.3 °F (24.1 °C) on December 8, 2016. The average wettest month is July which corresponds with the annual peak in thunderstorm activity. Since 1981, the wettest calendar day was 7.11 inches (181 mm) on September 16, 1999.

During winter months, the average annual extreme minimum air temperature is −1.3 °F (−18.5 °C). Since 1981, the coldest air temperature was −12.1 °F (−24.5 °C) on January 22, 1984. Episodes of extreme cold and wind can occur with wind chill values < −12 °F (−24 °C). The average annual snowfall (Nov-Apr) is between 30 inches (76 cm) and 36 inches (91 cm). Ice storms and large snowstorms depositing ≥ 12 inches (30 cm) of snow occur once every few years, particularly during nor’easters from December through February.

Climate data for Doylestown, Elevation 387 ft (118 m), 1981–2010 normals, extremes 1981–2018
Month	Jan	Feb	Mar	Apr	May	Jun	Jul	Aug	Sep	Oct	Nov	Dec	Year
Record high °F (°C)	70.7 (21.5)	77.6 (25.3)	86.9 (30.5)	93.8 (34.3)	94.5 (34.7)	95.6 (35.3)	102.8 (39.3)	99.2 (37.3)	97.2 (36.2)	89.2 (31.8)	80.7 (27.1)	75.0 (23.9)	102.8 (39.3)
Mean daily maximum °F (°C)	38.6 (3.7)	41.9 (5.5)	50.3 (10.2)	62.1 (16.7)	72.1 (22.3)	80.9 (27.2)	85.0 (29.4)	83.3 (28.5)	76.5 (24.7)	65.1 (18.4)	54.2 (12.3)	42.8 (6.0)	62.8 (17.1)
Daily mean °F (°C)	29.9 (−1.2)	32.7 (0.4)	40.3 (4.6)	51.0 (10.6)	60.7 (15.9)	70.0 (21.1)	74.5 (23.6)	72.9 (22.7)	65.6 (18.7)	53.9 (12.2)	44.3 (6.8)	34.4 (1.3)	52.6 (11.4)
Mean daily minimum °F (°C)	21.3 (−5.9)	23.5 (−4.7)	30.4 (−0.9)	40.0 (4.4)	49.4 (9.7)	59.1 (15.1)	64.0 (17.8)	62.5 (16.9)	54.8 (12.7)	42.7 (5.9)	34.3 (1.3)	25.9 (−3.4)	42.4 (5.8)
Record low °F (°C)	−12.1 (−24.5)	−4.4 (−20.2)	2.3 (−16.5)	16.6 (−8.6)	33.2 (0.7)	40.6 (4.8)	47.1 (8.4)	41.8 (5.4)	34.6 (1.4)	23.3 (−4.8)	11.0 (−11.7)	−2.7 (−19.3)	−12.1 (−24.5)
Average precipitation inches (mm)	3.23 (82)	2.62 (67)	3.71 (94)	3.90 (99)	4.36 (111)	4.33 (110)	5.02 (128)	4.05 (103)	4.46 (113)	4.24 (108)	3.63 (92)	3.90 (99)	47.45 (1,205)
Average relative humidity (%)	67.4	64.1	59.7	58.8	63.2	68.4	67.9	70.6	72.2	70.7	69.4	69.1	66.8
Average dew point °F (°C)	20.4 (−6.4)	21.9 (−5.6)	27.4 (−2.6)	37.1 (2.8)	48.1 (8.9)	59.1 (15.1)	63.2 (17.3)	62.8 (17.1)	56.4 (13.6)	44.6 (7.0)	34.9 (1.6)	25.3 (−3.7)	41.9 (5.5)
Source: PRISM

== Demographics ==
Historical population
Census	Pop.	Note	%±
1840	627		—
1850	1,006		60.4%
1860	1,432		42.3%
1870	1,601		11.8%
1880	2,070		29.3%
1890	1,733		−16.3%
1900	1,764		1.8%
1910	1,854		5.1%
1920	1,369		−26.2%
1930	1,371		0.1%
1940	4,976		262.9%
1950	5,262		5.7%
1960	5,917		12.4%
1970	8,270		39.8%
1980	8,717		5.4%
1990	8,575		−1.6%
2000	8,227		−4.1%
2010	8,380		1.9%
2020	8,300		−1.0%

As of the 2010 census, the borough was 94.8% Non-Hispanic White, 2.3% Black or African American, 0.2% Native American, 1.9% Asian, 0.1% Pacific Islander, and 1.5% were two or more races. 2.8% of the population were of Hispanic or Latino ancestry.

As of the census of 2000, there were 8,227 people, 3,952 households, and 1,908 families residing in the borough. The population density was 3,822.5 inhabitants per square mile (1,475.9/km^{2}). There were 4,055 housing units at an average density of 1,884.1 per square mile (727.5/km^{2}). The racial makeup of the borough was 95.24% White, 0.30% African American, 0.11% Native American, 1.42% Asian, 0.07% Pacific Islander, 0.43% from other races, and 0.63% from two or more races. Hispanic or Latino of any race were 2.20% of the population

There were 3,952 households, out of which 19.0% had children under the age of 18 living with them, 39.0% were married couples living together, 7.2% had a female householder with no husband present, and 51.7% were non-families. 44.4% of all households were made up of individuals, and 22.8% had someone living alone who was 65 years of age or older. The average household size was 1.98 and the average family size was 2.82.

In the borough, the population was spread out, with 16.5% under the age of 18, 5.7% from 18 to 24, 28.8% from 25 to 44, 23.5% from 45 to 64, and 25.4% who were 65 years of age or older. The median age was 44 years. For every 100 females there were 79.3 males. For every 100 females age 18 and over, there were 75.7 males.

The median income for a household in the borough was $46,148, and the median income for a family was $71,988. Males had a median income of $48,553 versus $31,703 for females. The per capita income for the borough was $32,249. About 2.5% of families and 4.4% of the population were below the poverty line, including 1.7% of those under age 18 and 9.6% of those age 65 or over. By 2024, the median household income had risen to $99,322.

=== Housing ===
According to the American Community Survey, the median property value in Doylestown was $527,700 in 2024, approximately 1.6 times the national median of $332,700 and among the highest of any borough in Pennsylvania. The homeownership rate was 47%, below the national average of 65%, reflecting the borough's high concentration of rental units, apartments, and mixed-use residential buildings in its walkable downtown core.

As of early 2026, the median sale price for homes in Doylestown was approximately $675,000, with properties in the Doylestown Historic District selling at a median of $1.1 million. Townhouses typically range from $350,000 to $600,000; single-family homes range from $600,000 to $950,000, with a significant number exceeding $1 million.

== Government ==
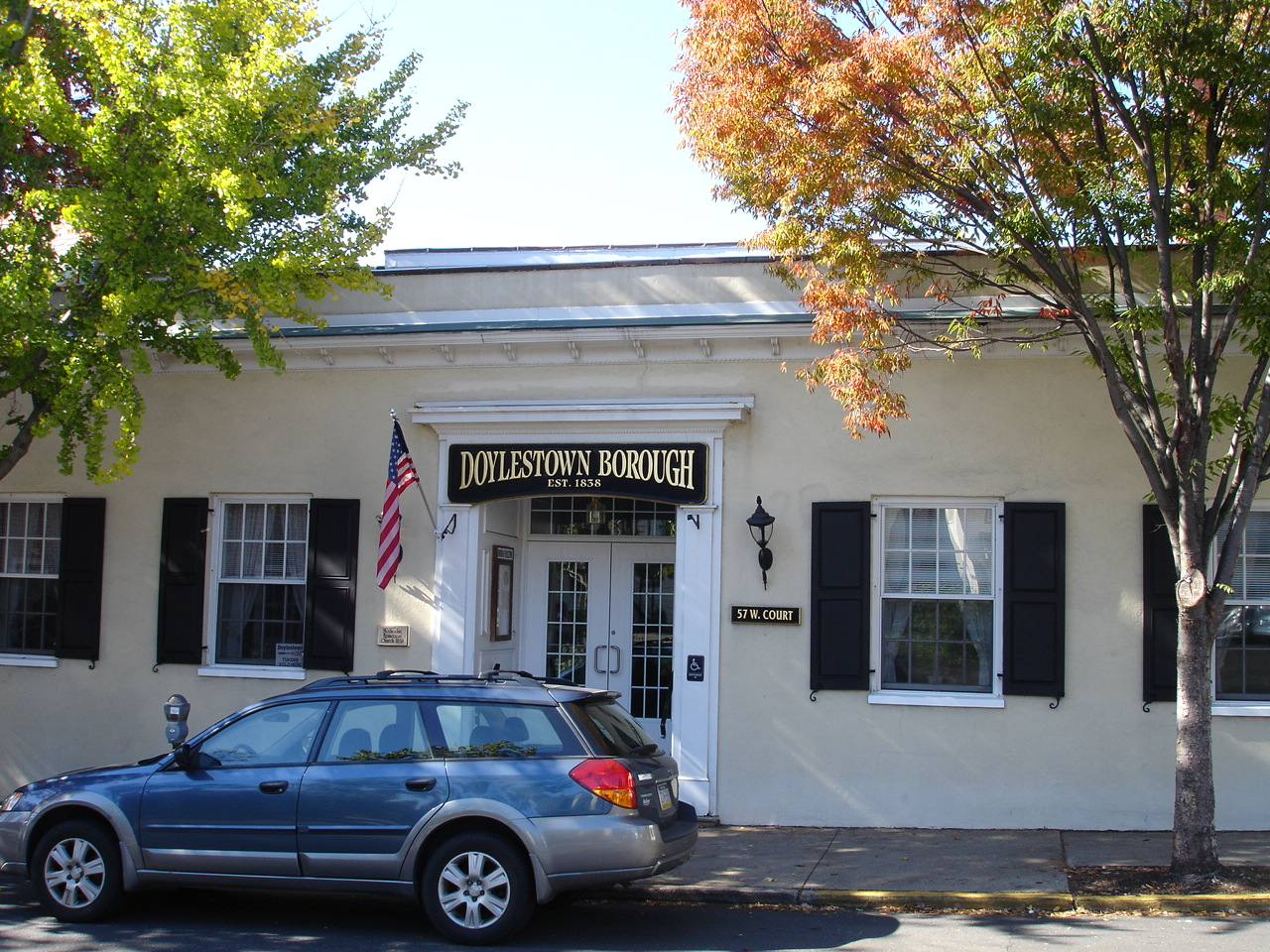
Former Borough Hall of Doylestown

Doylestown has a council-manager form of government consisting of a Mayor and a nine-member borough council. The mayor is elected at-large to a term of four years. The borough council is divided into three wards, with each ward electing three members to terms of four years. Borough council is in charge of enacting legislation, raising and spending public money, regulating land use, and providing public services. The council is required to meet once a month to conduct business. The borough council contains seven subcommittees.

As of 2022, the mayor of Doylestown is Elnora "Noni" West. The borough council consists of Council President Jack O'Brien, Council Vice-President Wendy Margolis, Ben Bell, Tim Brennan, Lawrence Browne, Dennis Livrone, Joe Frederick, Jennifer Jarret, and Amy Taylor Popkin.

== Media ==
The Intelligencer, a daily newspaper serving central and northern Bucks County along with nearby areas of eastern Montgomery County, is headquartered in Doylestown. In 1948, WBUX signed-on with 5,000 watts at 1570 on the AM dial. Today as WISP the station airs an All-Catholic format.

== Infrastructure ==
=== Transportation ===
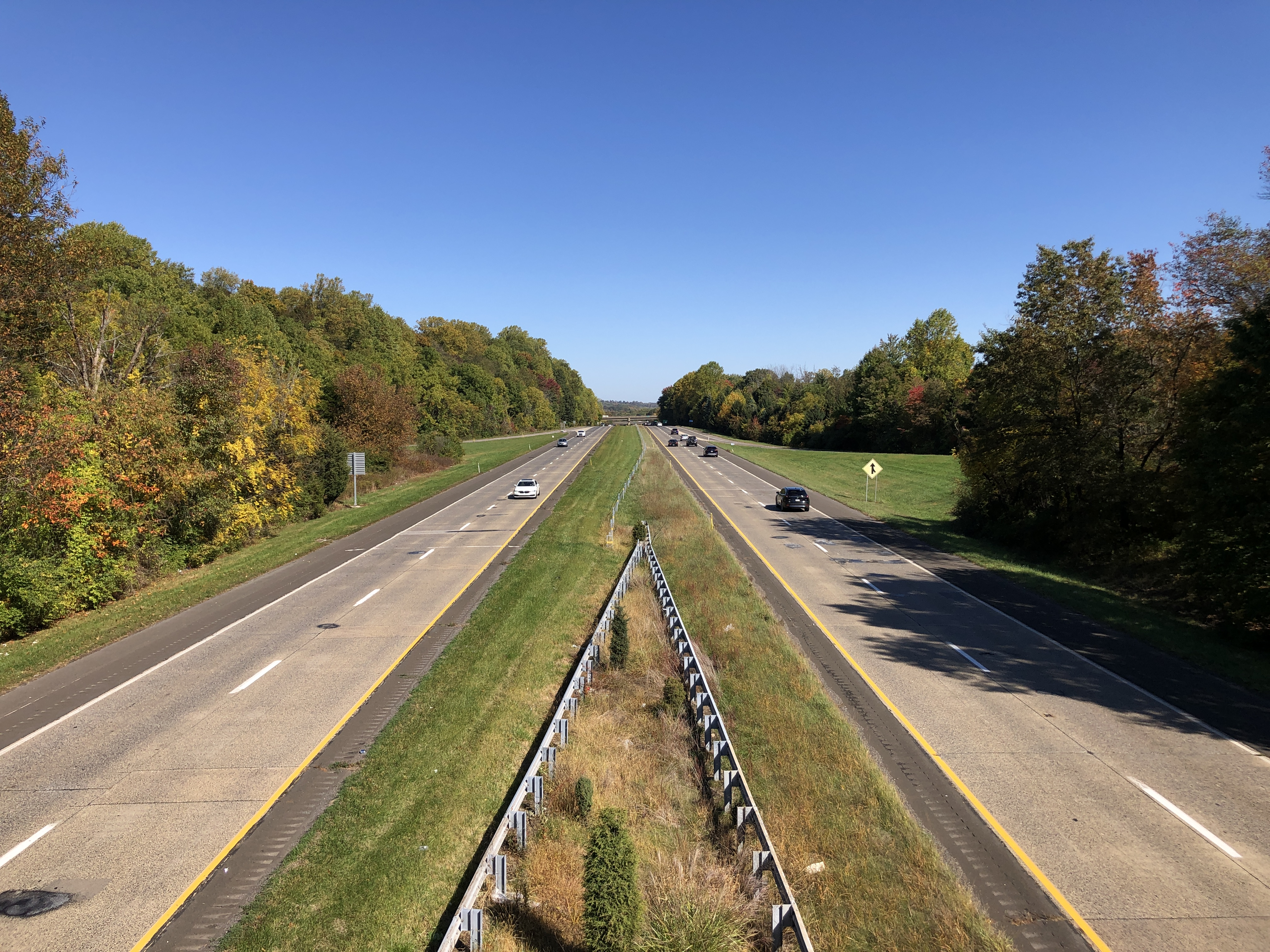
PA 611 northbound in Doylestown

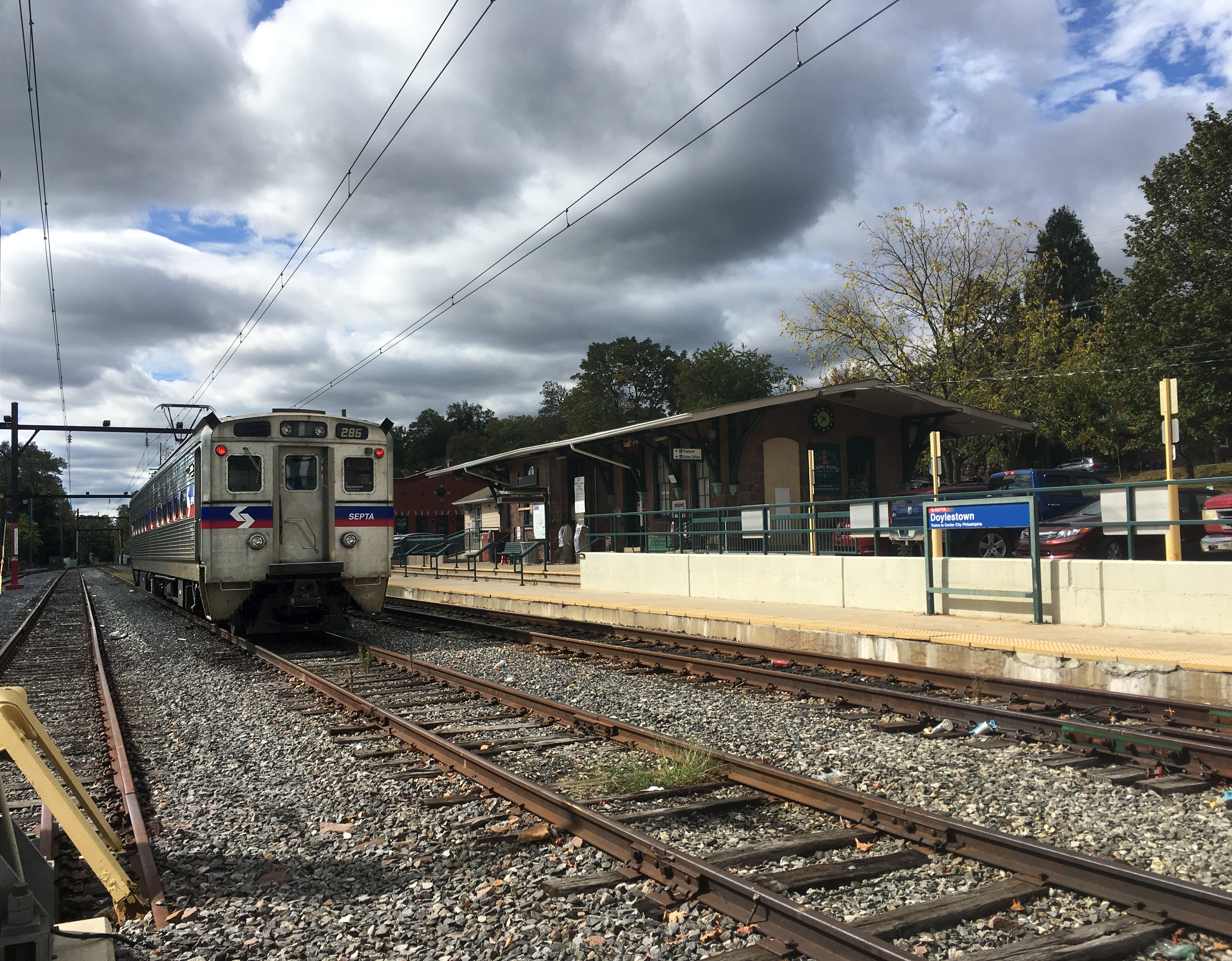
Doylestown station, which serves as the terminus of the Lansdale/Doylestown Line

As of 2018 there were 34.88 miles (56.13 km) of public roads in Doylestown, of which 5.59 miles (9.00 km) were maintained by the Pennsylvania Department of Transportation (PennDOT) and 29.29 miles (47.14 km) were maintained by the borough.

Highways include:

- U.S. Route 202
- Route 611

Bus service includes:

- The Lansdale/Doylestown Line of SEPTA Regional Rail, which connects Doylestown to Center City Philadelphia. Doylestown station is the northernmost stop.
- SEPTA Route 55 bus, which runs south to Olney Transit Center in Philadelphia.
- Trans-Bridge Lines, which connects Doylestown to New Jersey and the Port Authority Bus Terminal in New York City.
- Greyhound Lines, which provides intercity bus service to Doylestown along a route running between Philadelphia and Scranton.
- Fullington Trailways provides intercity bus service to Doylestown along a route running between the Philadelphia and Williamsport.
- Doylestown DART, a local bus operated by Bucks County Transport, providing a single weekday and Saturday route. Other local buses include DART West and DART South. The Bucks County Courthouse Shuttle is operated weekdays by Bucks County Transport.

Doylestown Airport, a general aviation airport operated by the Bucks County Airport Authority, is located to the north of Doylestown.

The Doylestown Community Bike and Hike System—founded in 1992—consists of over 25 miles (40 km) of trails and side paths for pedestrians and bicycles serving both the borough of Doylestown and Doylestown Township.

=== Utilities ===
Electricity and natural gas in Doylestown is provided by PECO Energy Company, a subsidiary of Exelon. The Doylestown Borough Water Department provides water to the borough and some surrounding areas. Bucks County Water and Sewer owns and operates the sewer system in Doylestown. Trash and recycling collection in Doylestown is provided by the borough's Public Works department.

=== Health care ===
Penn Medicine Doylestown Hospital, located on West State Street in Doylestown Township, is a not-for-profit community teaching hospital founded in 1923, when it opened as an eight-bed emergency facility. Affiliated with the University of Pennsylvania Health System, the hospital has grown to 245 beds with more than 435 physicians and health care providers across more than 50 specialty areas, and employs more than 2,700 people. It serves patients across Bucks and Montgomery counties in Pennsylvania and Hunterdon and Mercer counties in New Jersey.

The Lenape Valley Foundation, a nonprofit behavioral health organization headquartered in Doylestown and serving Bucks County for more than 60 years, provides mental health, substance use, intellectual disability, and early intervention services to more than 10,000 adults and 4,000 children annually. In partnership with Doylestown Health, Bucks County government, and local health organizations, the foundation is constructing the Bright Path Center, a 22,000-square-foot behavioral health crisis stabilization center at 500 North West Street in Doylestown. Described as the first facility of its kind in Pennsylvania, the center will offer trauma-informed crisis care for adults and children in separate dedicated spaces, reducing reliance on hospital emergency rooms. Groundbreaking occurred in spring 2024 with completion expected in 2026.

The Dementia Society of America, a national nonprofit organization focused on awareness, education, and research across all forms of dementia, is headquartered in Doylestown. Founded in 2013, the organization operates programs spanning arts, music, and community engagement for individuals and caregivers affected by dementia, and holds a four-star rating from Charity Navigator.

The Hepatitis B Foundation, a nonprofit biomedical research organization dedicated to the prevention and treatment of hepatitis B and liver cancer, is headquartered in Doylestown at the Pennsylvania Biotechnology Center on Swamp Road. The foundation operates one of the leading hepatitis B research programs in the United States and maintains a global patient registry.

The Pennsylvania Biotechnology Center, located on Swamp Road in Doylestown Township, is a life sciences incubator housing biomedical research and pharmaceutical companies and serving as a hub for biotechnology development in the Philadelphia region.

== Arts & culture ==
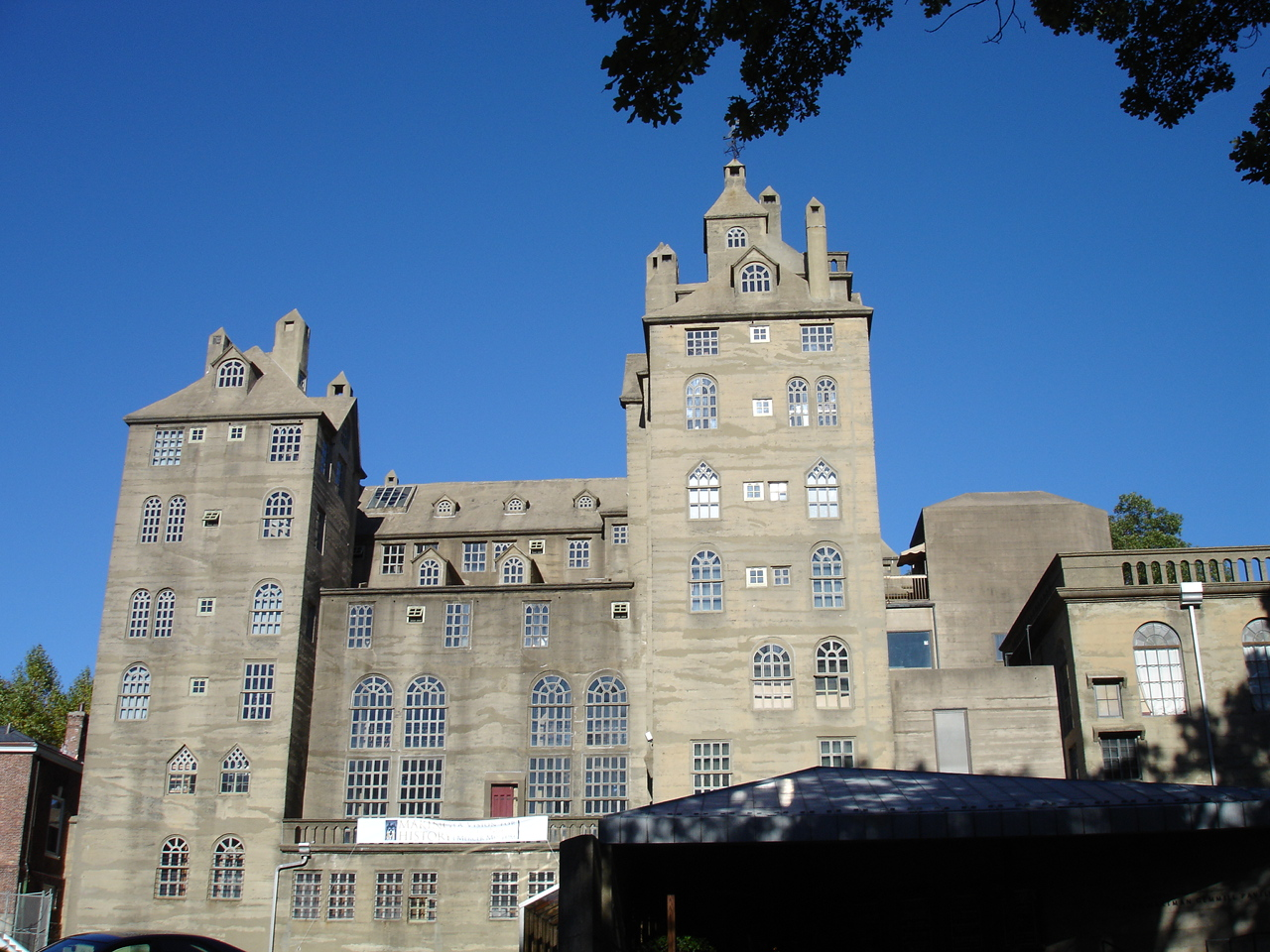
Mercer Museum

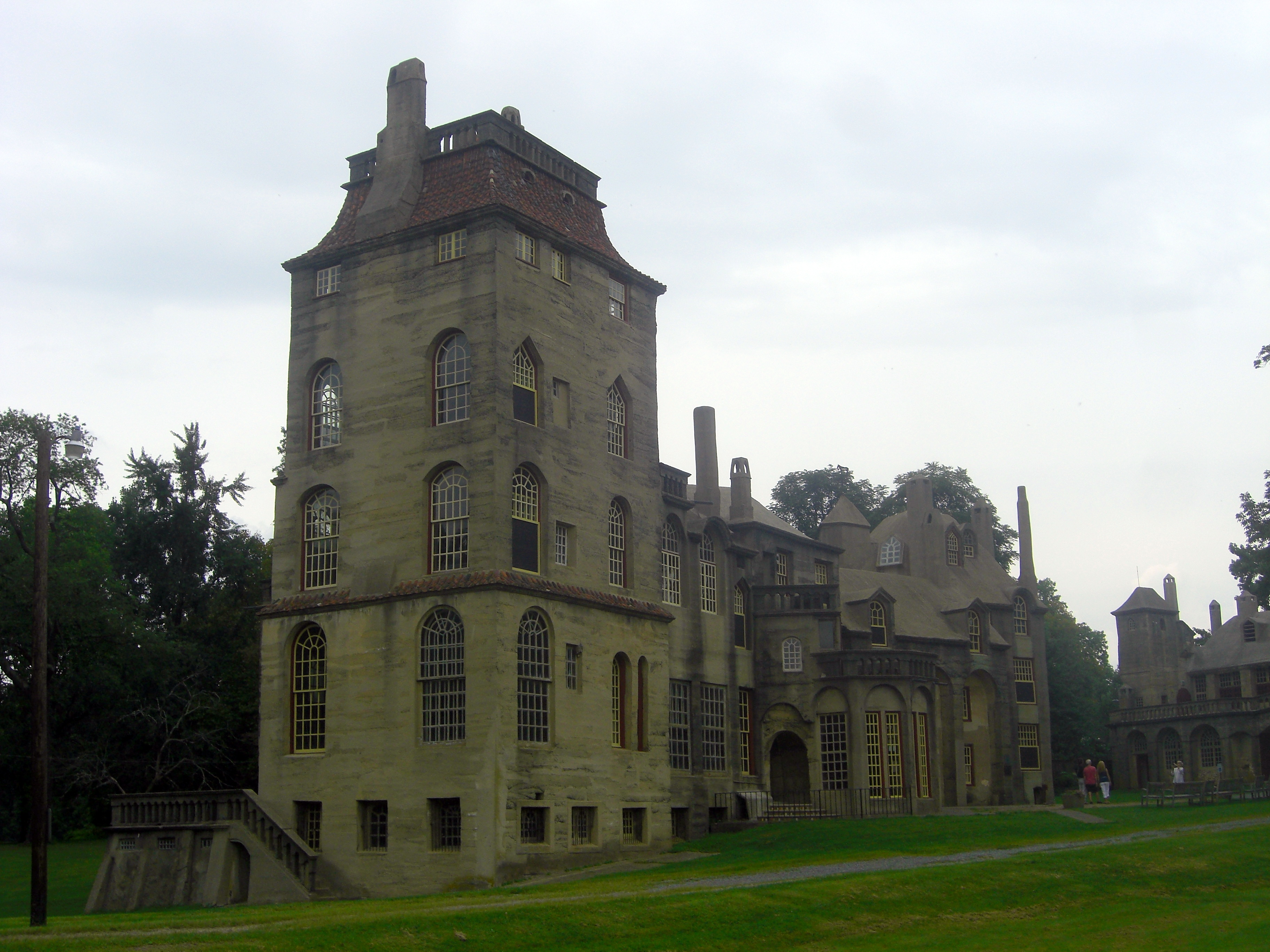
Fonthill Castle

=== The Mercer Mile ===
Doylestown Borough is home to three structures designed and built by Henry Chapman Mercer. The Mercer Museum, built in poured concrete, houses his collection of early American artifacts including the collection known as "Tools of the Nation-Maker", one of the most important of its kind in the world. The Bucks County Historical Society also maintains the Spruance Library, a research library adjoining the museum. Fonthill (also known as "Mercer's Castle") in Doylestown Township was Mercer's home and houses his collection of artifacts from around the world. The Moravian Pottery and Tile Works in Doylestown Township is an operational facility utilizing the tools and techniques used by Pennsylvania German potters in the 18th and 19th centuries.

=== James A. Michener Art Museum ===
The former county prison, across the street from the Mercer Museum, has been converted into the James A. Michener Art Museum, which holds one of the most significant collections of Pennsylvania Impressionist art in the world. The borough also boasts a small music conservatory, writers' and artists' organizations, and other cultural activities.

==== Notable exhibitions ====
- Keith Haring: A Radiant Legacy (March 12 – July 31, 2022) at the James A. Michener Art Museum featured more than 100 works from a private collection, including two rare Subway drawings and Medusa Head, the largest print in Keith Haring's oeuvre. Haring, who was born in Reading and raised in nearby Kutztown, had deep ties to the region.
- Small Living Things: The Magical Art of Eric Carle (February 14 – May 24, 2026) at the James A. Michener Art Museum featured 86 original illustrations from classics including The Very Hungry Caterpillar, The Very Quiet Cricket, and Brown Bear, Brown Bear, What Do You See?, Carle's collaboration with Bill Martin Jr. Organized by the Eric Carle Museum of Picture Book Art in Amherst, Massachusetts, the exhibition extended into a borough-wide scavenger hunt and programming across all seven branches of the Bucks County Free Library.

=== Bucks County Free Library ===
The Doylestown branch of the Bucks County Free Library, located at 150 South Pine Street, is the system's primary hub serving the county's 627,000+ residents across seven branches. The library traces its origins to the Doylestown Library Company, founded in 1856, and the Melinda Cox Free Library, which opened in 1917. The branch moved to its current location in 1977 and maintains a Local History Collection featuring materials documenting Doylestown's history from its founding through the 20th century.

=== National Shrine of Our Lady of Czestochowa ===
The National Shrine of Our Lady of Czestochowa, a Polish-American Roman Catholic shrine located near Doylestown, houses a painting of the Black Madonna of Częstochowa, Poland.

== Events and festivals ==
Doylestown hosts a number of annual community events that draw visitors from across Bucks County and the greater Philadelphia region.

=== Doylestown Arts Festival and Bucks County Classic ===
The Doylestown Arts Festival, held annually on the second weekend of September, transforms the streets of historic downtown Doylestown into a two-day outdoor celebration of art and music. Founded in 1991 by a small group of volunteers, the festival has grown into one of the largest arts festivals in the region, featuring more than 160 juried independent artists, live music across five stages, interactive demonstrations, and a food court. Free to attend, the festival draws an estimated 20,000 to 30,000 attendees each year.

On the Sunday of the festival weekend, the Bucks County Classic criterium bicycle race circles the festival perimeter on a 1.4-mile, eight-turn course through downtown Doylestown. Now in its 21st year, the race draws professional men's and women's fields including national and international competitors, alongside amateur, masters, and children's races. The combined weekend is widely described as "Bucks County's Biggest Weekend," drawing over 30,000 spectators to the borough.

=== Doylestown at Dusk Car Show ===
The Doylestown at Dusk Car Show, held annually on the third Saturday of July, is hosted by the Doylestown Rotary Club and spans the streets of downtown Doylestown from 5 to 10 p.m. The show features more than 500 vehicles including muscle cars, vintage automobiles, trucks, and high-performance imports set against the backdrop of the historic borough streetscape. Free to attend, the show draws approximately 30,000 visitors and raises funds for local nonprofits including the Bucks County Opportunity Council and Doylestown Health.

=== Doylestown Winterfest and Annual Tree Lighting ===
The Doylestown Winterfest is an annual holiday celebration organized by Discover Doylestown spanning the weeks between Thanksgiving and Christmas. The centerpiece is the Annual Tree Lighting and Santa Parade, held on the Friday after Thanksgiving at the intersection of State and Main Streets. First held in 1913, the tree lighting has become one of the borough's most enduring traditions, drawing thousands of residents and visitors each year to watch the illumination of a towering Norway Spruce donated annually to the town.

=== Doylestown Memorial Day Parade ===
The Doylestown Memorial Day Parade, first held in 1868 — the same year Decoration Day was first observed in the United States — is one of the oldest Memorial Day parades in the nation. The parade steps off at 10 a.m. from Central Bucks High School West, marching east on West Court Street, east on West State Street, north on Main Street, and ending at Doylestown Cemetery with a 30-minute wreath-laying ceremony conducted by the United Veterans of Doylestown. The parade typically draws approximately 1,700 participants across more than 100 units, including eight school bands, and an estimated 15,000 spectators.

=== Spooktacular Costume Parade and Witches Ride ===
The Spooktacular Costume Contest and Parade, held annually in late October, is a free family Halloween event organized by Discover Doylestown on the lawn of the Bucks County Administration Building at 55 East Court Street. The event features a judged costume contest for children, pets, and families, followed by a costumed parade led through downtown Doylestown by the Doylestown Bike Witches — a group of costumed cyclists who have become a signature feature of the borough's Halloween tradition. After the parade, participating businesses along the route offer trick-or-treating. The Witches Ride is a separate pre-registered slow bicycle ride through town for costume-wearing participants of all ages held the same morning.

=== Movies at the Mercer ===
Movies at the Mercer is an outdoor film series presented by the Mercer Museum and the County Theater, held monthly on the museum's green from spring through October. Films are screened after dusk against the backdrop of Mercer's towering concrete castle, with gates opening before showtime for picnicking. The series is produced in partnership with Shankweiler's Drive-In, one of the oldest operating drive-in theaters in the United States. Programming ranges from classic Hollywood films to family favorites.

== Dining ==
Doylestown's downtown is home to a concentration of independently owned restaurants, cafes, bars, and breweries. East State Street, known locally as Restaurant Row, is lined with dining establishments ranging from wood-fired pizza and farm-to-table American cuisine to Greek, Italian, Mexican, and Asian fare. The borough also supports a craft brewery, an independent winery, and multiple gastropubs along its historic streets.

From May through October, the Borough of Doylestown operates a recurring Pedestrian Zone program — known locally as Borough Block Parties — in which designated downtown streets close to vehicle traffic on Friday and Saturday evenings from 5 to 11 p.m. The closures rotate among West State Street, North Main Street, East State Street, and Printers Alley, allowing restaurants and shops to expand seating and displays into the street. The program began in June 2020 as part of Operation Doylestown, a borough initiative to support small businesses during the COVID-19 pandemic, and has since become a permanent seasonal fixture drawing residents and visitors to the downtown on weekend evenings. Downtown parking is free after 5 p.m. on Fridays and Saturdays during the program.

== Music culture ==
Doylestown has a musical history spanning Broadway, pop, rock, and jazz. Oscar Hammerstein II lived and wrote at Highland Farm in Doylestown for 20 years, producing some of the most celebrated musicals in American theater history. His protégé Stephen Sondheim, who grew up in the area under Hammerstein's mentorship, went on to win eight Tony Awards. Singer P!nk, who attended Central Bucks High School West, has won three Grammy Awards and sold more than 60 million records worldwide.

=== Historical ===
- Oscar Hammerstein II, lyricist and theatrical producer, purchased Highland Farm in Doylestown in 1940 and lived there for 20 years until his death on August 23, 1960. Working with composer Richard Rodgers, he wrote the book and lyrics for Oklahoma! (1943), Carousel (1945), South Pacific (1949), The King and I (1951), and The Sound of Music (1959), earning five Tony Awards and two Pulitzer Prizes.
- James A. Michener wrote Tales of the South Pacific while living in Doylestown, a collection that won the Pulitzer Prize for Fiction in 1948.
- Stephen Sondheim moved to Bucks County after his parents divorced and attended George School, a Quaker preparatory school near Doylestown. His neighbor was Oscar Hammerstein II, who became a mentor and had a lasting influence on his development as a songwriter.

=== Contemporary ===
- Singer P!nk, born Alecia Moore, attended Central Bucks High School West before achieving international success as a pop and rock recording artist, winning three Grammy Awards including for "Lady Marmalade" (2002) and "Imagine" (2011).
- Singer-songwriter Ryan Adams named his 2019 single "Doylestown Girl" after the borough, with the track premiering on WXPN 88.5 FM in Philadelphia.
- Ceramic Animal, a rock band formed in Doylestown, self-released three albums before signing to Dan Auerbach's Easy Eye Sound label and touring North America as a supporting act for The Black Keys in 2022.
- Balance and Composure and Superheaven, both alternative rock bands with roots in the Doylestown area, built national followings through independent releases and touring.
- Philadelphia pop-punk band The Wonder Years have performed in Doylestown and maintain connections to the region’s music scene.
- Justin Guarini, runner-up on the first season of American Idol in 2002, attended Central Bucks High School East in Doylestown and went on to a career spanning music, Broadway, and television.

=== Music events and venues ===
- Siren Records, an independent record store established in 1988, carries new and used vinyl and CDs and hosts live in-store performances.
- The James A. Michener Art Museum hosts an annual Jazz Night concert series featuring world-class performers in an intimate setting. The 25th anniversary series in 2023 featured jazz ensemble Hudson — keyboardist John Medeski, guitarist John Scofield, drummer Jack DeJohnette, and bassist Larry Grenadier.
- Stage United, a nonprofit concert organization founded in 2024 by Doylestown resident Joe Montone, produces recurring free outdoor concert series at Broad Commons Park in partnership with the Borough of Doylestown, including the Concerts at the Commons series held across spring and fall.
- Picnics on Pine is an outdoor block party concert series that transforms Pine Street into a neighborhood amphitheater featuring live music, food vendors, and a craft market.
- A Night of Song is an indoor concert series held inside the Big Room at the Moravian Pottery and Tile Works, produced by Stage United in partnership with WXPN 88.5 FM.
- AbbeyFest, an annual Catholic faith and music festival now in its twelfth year, has been held at the National Shrine of Our Lady of Czestochowa in Doylestown since 2025. The day-long festival features contemporary Christian music, drawing more than 6,000 attendees.

== In popular culture ==
- The HBO series The Gilded Age (2022) begins in Doylestown and references to Doylestown are made throughout the series.
- The 2024 drama film The Brutalist, directed by Brady Corbet, focuses on fictional architect László Tóth being commissioned to build an enormous community center in the borough.
- The 2002 science fiction horror film Signs, directed by M. Night Shyamalan, was filmed in Doylestown at Delaware Valley University.
- The 2009 short film Revenge of the Don” was filmed in Doylestown.

== Recreation ==
=== River Crossing YMCA ===
The River Crossing YMCA operates a branch in Doylestown Township at 2500 Lower State Road. The facility was established in the mid-1960s and moved to its current location in 1974 when David and Mary Burpee donated a 7.5-acre site. The building opened in 1979 and expanded most recently in 2009 with the addition of a second indoor pool, expanded fitness center, and new studio spaces. The branch features a six-lane, 25-meter competition pool, a waterpark pool with water slide and hot tub, a full-size gymnasium, fitness center, four group fitness studios, sauna, and teen center.

The branch also operates an indoor skatepark designed by skatepark architect Gene Rosmarin, open to skaters of all levels for recreational sessions, lessons, and seasonal tournaments. It is among the few YMCA-operated skateparks in the United States.

=== Central Park ===
Doylestown Township completed a $12.9 million Central Park Improvement Project in 2025, opening an 18,000-square-foot Community Recreation Center at 425 Wells Road. The facility includes a 7,700-square-foot gymnasium, three multi-purpose rooms, a warming kitchen, and an indoor-outdoor patio. The project also added new lighted outdoor courts including four tennis courts, six pickleball courts, two basketball courts, and two bocce ball courts — the latter designated as home base for a Special Olympics bocce ball team.

=== Peace Valley Park ===
Peace Valley Park, a 1,500-acre Bucks County park located adjacent to Doylestown Township, surrounds Lake Galena, a 365-acre lake formed by the damming of the north branch of the Neshaminy Creek. The park offers a 6.1-mile paved trail around the lake popular for hiking, running, and cycling, as well as fishing, and seasonal boat rentals including rowboats, canoes, pedal boats, and single and double kayaks. The Peace Valley Nature Center, located at the northeastern end of the park, maintains more than fifteen miles of trails and has been designated an Important Bird Area by the Pennsylvania Audubon Society. Over 297 bird species have been confirmed in the park, including bald eagles and various birds of prey.

=== Privately Owned Recreation ===
Doylestown includes a range of privately operated recreational facilities, including a tennis club, indoor rock climbing gym, golf simulator studio, ski and snowboard training center, aviation training services at Doylestown Airport, and an escape room, among others.

== Notable people ==
- Tony Angelo, racing driver
- Jay Ansill, folk musician
- Robert C. Atherton, former magazine editor, writer, and artist
- Stefan Avalos, filmmaker
- Balance and Composure, alternative rock band
- Amos W. Barber, former surgeon and second governor of Wyoming
- Christian Bauman, novelist and NPR commentator
- Stan and Jan Berenstain, authors and illustrators
- Weyes Blood, musician
- Bill Bloom, songwriter and musician
- Kathy Boockvar, former Pennsylvania Secretary of State
- Władysław Bortnowski, former Polish general
- Pearl S. Buck, author, winner of 1938 Nobel Prize in Literature
- Clarence Buckman, politician
- Alan Campbell, screenwriter
- Gil Cohen, artist
- Caroline Doty, basketball player
- Molly Ephraim, actress
- Chris Forsberg, drifting driver
- William Edgar Geil, unordained evangelist, explorer, lecturer, photographer, and author
- Anthony Green, musician
- Scott Green, NFL referee
- William Godshalk, member of the U.S. House of Representatives
- David Gordon, classical tenor
- Roy M. Gulick, Major General and Quartermaster
- Justin Guarini, singer and actor
- Oscar Hammerstein II, lyricist and theatrical producer
- George Michener Hart, pioneer in American railroad preservation
- Annie Haslam, singer, songwriter, artist
- Samantha Hoopes, model
- Charles T. Horner Jr., U.S. Army officer
- Edward L. Howard, politician
- Josh Izewski, distance runner
- Joe Judge, former New York Giants head coach
- William A. McCain, US Army brigadier general
- Margaret Mead, anthropologist
- Henry Chapman Mercer, archaeologist, artist, and tile maker
- James A. Michener, novelist
- Anthony Morelli, blogger
- Jeff Musselman, former MLB pitcher
- Irene Molloy, singer and actress
- Mike Pettine, Cleveland Browns head coach
- Pink, pop and rock singer
- Camille Schrier, American pageant titleholder
- Mike Senica, race car driver
- Charles Sheeler, artist
- Sinch, rock band
- Michael Smerconish, radio and television host
- Dodie Smith, author
- Stephen Sondheim, composer and lyricist
- Timothy Stack, actor
- Stephen Susco, screenwriter
- Dave Taber, retired soccer player
- Colin Thompson, racing driver
- Jean Toomer, author
- Jon Van Dine, drummer of indie-pop band CRUISR
- Jeremy Kipp Walker, film producer
- John Hosea Washburn, college president
- Michael E. Wegscheider, U.S. Army major general
- John Wexley, playwright, screenwriter, and author
- R. Foster Winans, former Wall Street Journal columnist
- Robert Morris Yardley, member of the U.S. House of Representatives
