= John D. Stiles =

American politician

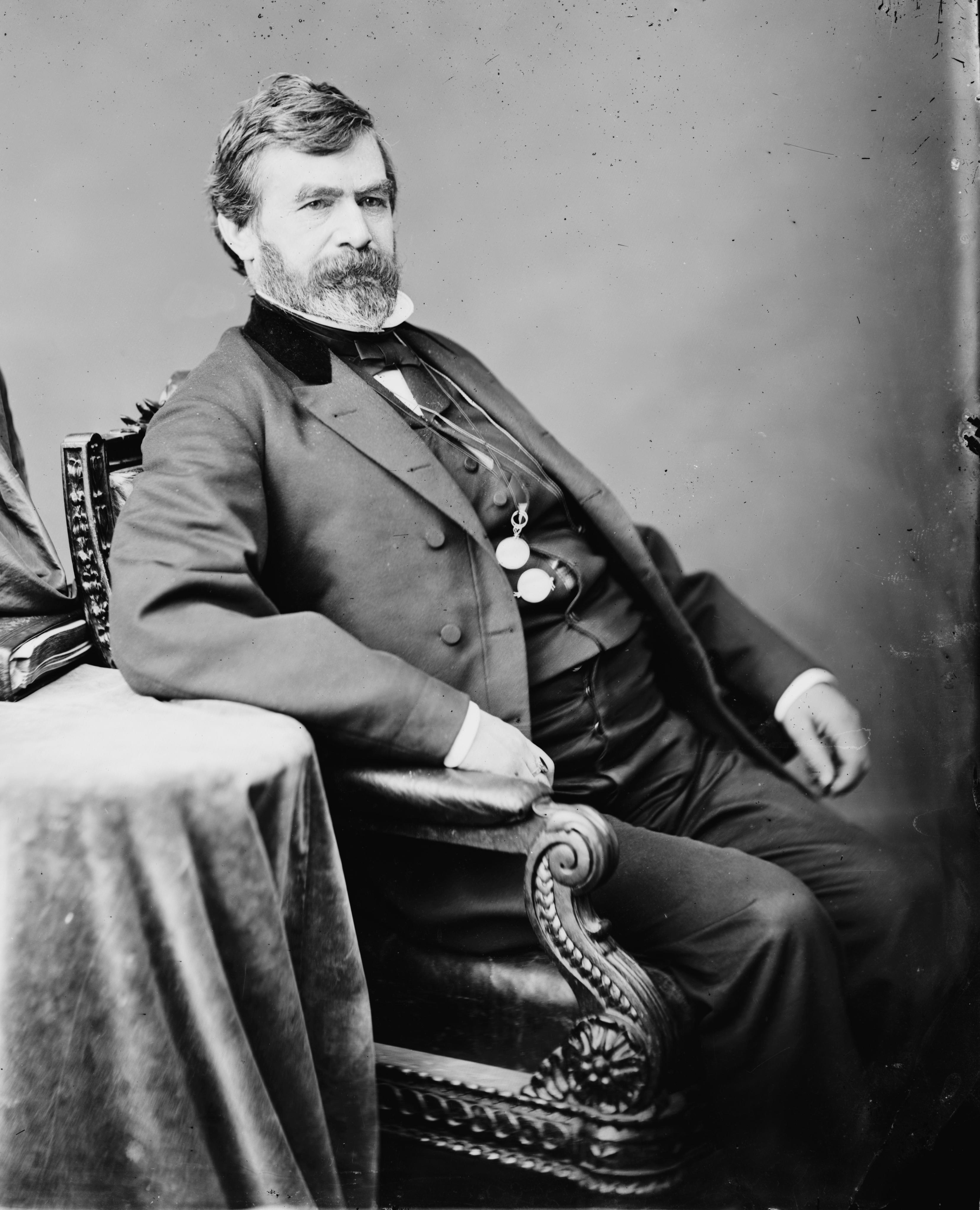
John Dodson Stiles

John Dodson Stiles (January 15, 1822 – October 29, 1896) was a Democratic member of the U.S. House of Representatives from Pennsylvania.

John D. Stiles was born in Town Hill, Pennsylvania. He studied law, was admitted to the bar in 1844 and practiced in Allentown, Pennsylvania. He was elected district attorney of Lehigh County, Pennsylvania, in 1853 and served three years. He was a delegate to the Democratic National Convention in 1856, 1864, and 1868. He was also a delegate to the Union National Convention at Philadelphia in 1866.

Stiles was elected as a Democrat to the Thirty-seventh Congress to fill the vacancy caused by the death of Thomas B. Cooper. He was reelected to the Thirty-eighth Congress. He was again elected to the Forty-first Congress. He was not a candidate for renomination in 1870. He resumed the practice of law and died in Allentown in 1896. Interment in Fairview Cemetery.

== Sources ==
- United States Congress. "John D. Stiles (id: S000924)". Biographical Directory of the United States Congress.
- The Political Graveyard

U.S. House of Representatives
Preceded by Thomas B. Cooper	Member of the U.S. House of Representatives from Pennsylvania's 7th congressional district 1862–1863	Succeeded by John M. Broomall
Preceded by John Hickman	Member of the U.S. House of Representatives from Pennsylvania's 6th congressional district 1863–1865	Succeeded by Benjamin M. Boyer
Preceded by Benjamin M. Boyer	Member of the U.S. House of Representatives from Pennsylvania's 6th congressional district 1869–1871	Succeeded by Ephraim L. Acker
