= R. Foster Winans =

Foster Winans
- Born: August 5, 1948 (age 78); Philadelphia, Pennsylvania
- Occupations: Journalist, author, ghostwriter, commentator
- Writing career
- Genres: Business, finance, memoir
- Notable works: Trading Secrets: Seduction and Scandal at The Wall Street Journal
- Website: wkpublishing.com

Robert Foster Winans (born August 5, 1948) is a former columnist for The Wall Street Journal who co-wrote the "Heard on the Street" column from 1982 to 1984 and was convicted of insider trading and mail fraud. He was indicted by then-U.S. Attorney Rudolph Giuliani and convicted in 1985 of violating Federal law by leaking advance word of the contents of his columns to a stockbroker, Peter N. Brant, at Kidder, Peabody & Co., an old-line brokerage firm. Brant was decades later labeled a recidivist by the U.S. Securities and Exchange Commission. Winans' conviction for violating securities law was affirmed by the U.S. Supreme Court in 1987 as Carpenter v. United States (1987) by a rare 4–4 deadlocked vote. However, the Supreme Court unanimously affirmed his convictions for committing federal mail and wire fraud. He served nine months in federal prison.

== Conviction ==
Winans admitted his participation in the scheme and to earning $31,000 from it, but pleaded not guilty, arguing that his behavior was unethical but not criminal. Winans was found guilty and sentenced to 18 months in prison, later reduced to a year and a day. In a 2006 speech on the importance of ethical journalism as a necessary aid to help the SEC combat stock market fraud, Christopher Cox, chairman of the SEC, stated that "Winans, who was found guilty of 59 separate counts of securities fraud, is by no means the only journalist who has stood accused of law breaking, and who brought disgrace to (journalism)."

Both the securities industry and the First Amendment lobby criticized the prosecution as overstepping the bounds of the securities laws, and filed amicus briefs during the appeals process. Winans's case included two co-defendants and reached the U.S. Supreme Court in 1987 as Carpenter v. United States, where the conviction was affirmed by a rare 4–4 deadlock. The missing member was due to the retirement of Justice Lewis F. Powell Jr. The Supreme Court unanimously affirmed his convictions for committing federal mail and wire fraud, however. The case is still taught in law and journalism schools. Winans's book about the case, Trading Secrets, was published in 1986 by St. Martin's Press in the U.S. and under the title Wall Street in France. It was excerpted in Esquire magazine and was a Book-of-the-Month Club Selection.

== Later life ==
Winans has ghosted, co-written, and/or independently produced more than 30 books in the two decades since serving nine months in Federal prison in 1988. In 1999, he founded a nonprofit writers resource center in Bucks County, Pennsylvania, and ran it for six years before returning to writing and producing books.

Between 2003 and 2005, with the indictment and conviction of Martha Stewart in connection with suspicious trades in Imclone stock, Winans frequently appeared on television and radio programs discussing the issue of insider trading, Stewart's likely fate, and business ethics. He has appeared before law-enforcement and academic audiences speaking about his experiences and the psychology behind white-collar crime.

Winans once asserted, "The only reason to invest in the market is because you think you know something others don't." He is now the President and Chief Creative Officer of Winans Kuenstler Publishing, which claims to be involved in "Ghost Writing, Production, Distribution, and Marketing of Books That Make a Difference by Authors with Fresh Ideas."
