= The Fountain House (Doylestown, Pennsylvania) =

Historic house in Pennsylvania, United States

- Fountain House
- U.S. National Register of Historic Places
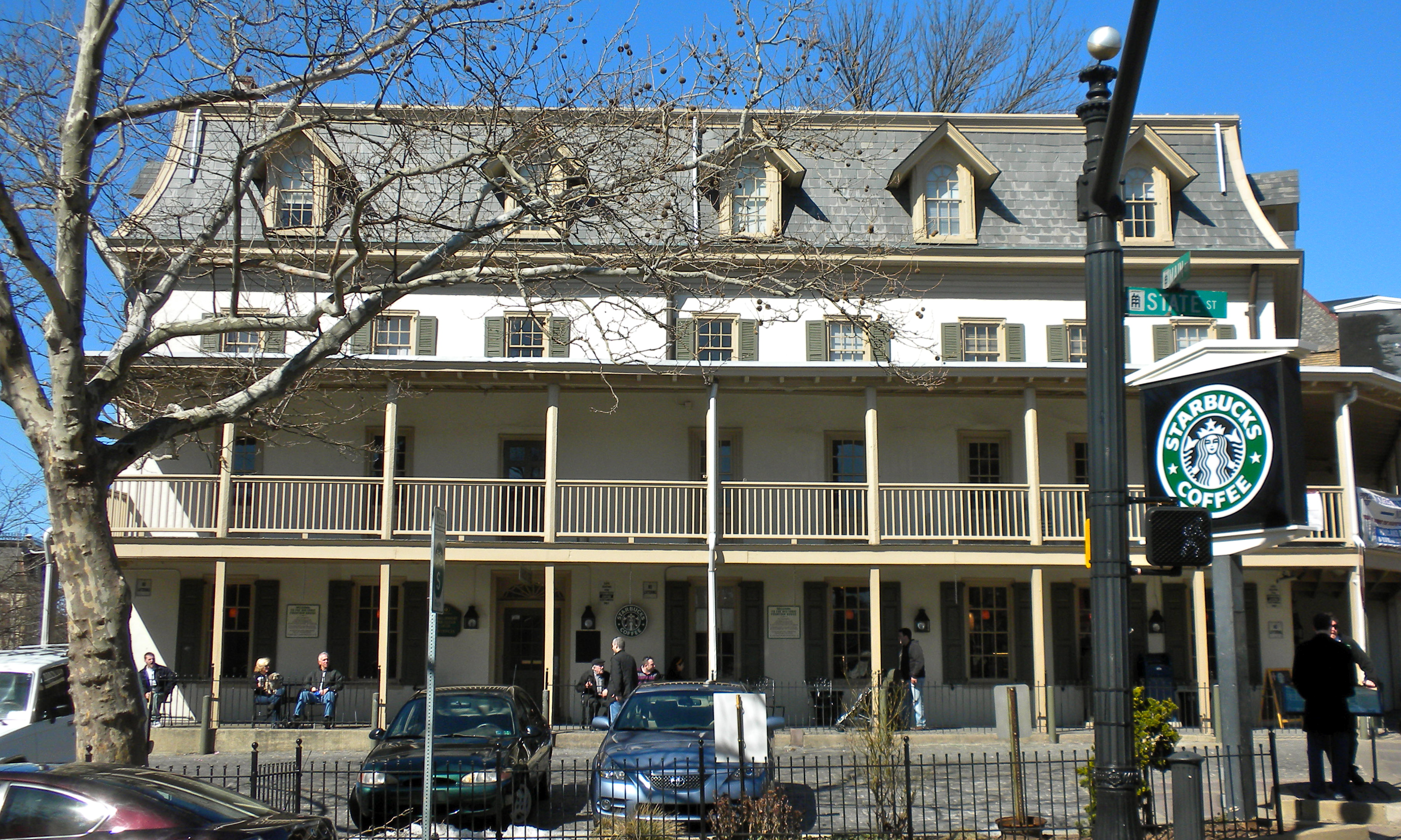
- The Fountain House in 2010

- Location within Pennsylvania Location within the United States
- Location: State and Main Sts., Doylestown, Pennsylvania
- Coordinates: 40°18′36″N 75°7′51″W
- Area: less than one acre
- Built: 1758
- Architectural style: Late Victorian
- NRHP reference No.: 72001095
- Added to NRHP: March 16, 1972

The Fountain House is a historic tavern building located in the borough of Doylestown, Pennsylvania, in the central commercial district. The four-story building is a major landmark of the Bucks County area. It was added to the National Register of Historic Places in 1972.

== History ==
The Fountain House, Ca 1850–1880

The Fountain House was one of seven taverns in pre-revolutionary Doylestown. It was constructed by William Doyle, the founder of Doylestown. The first part of the building was constructed in 1758. Owned by a Tory during the American Revolutionary War, it was seized by government authorities and sold at auction. Throughout the 19th century, The Fountain House hosted, in addition to a tavern, the first Doylestown post office, and a stagecoach line connecting Philadelphia and Easton.

== Construction ==
The Fountain House, built primarily in the Victorian style, has gone through a number of changes.

- 1758: Original stone structure built
- 1830: Third story added
- 1849: Two additional structures built on either side
- 1876: Gabled Roof replaced with Mansard Roof
- 1971: Restored

== Current occupants ==
Currently, The Fountain House hosts several business occupants, including a Starbucks coffee shop which occupies the entire first floor. Several law offices and apartments are located on the second and third floors. It is a major social gathering location in Doylestown. The town's Christmas Tree is placed in front of the building annually.
