= Shaw Historic District, Doylestown, Pennsylvania =

Historic district in Pennsylvania, United States

- Shaw Historic District
- U.S. National Register of Historic Places
- U.S. Historic district
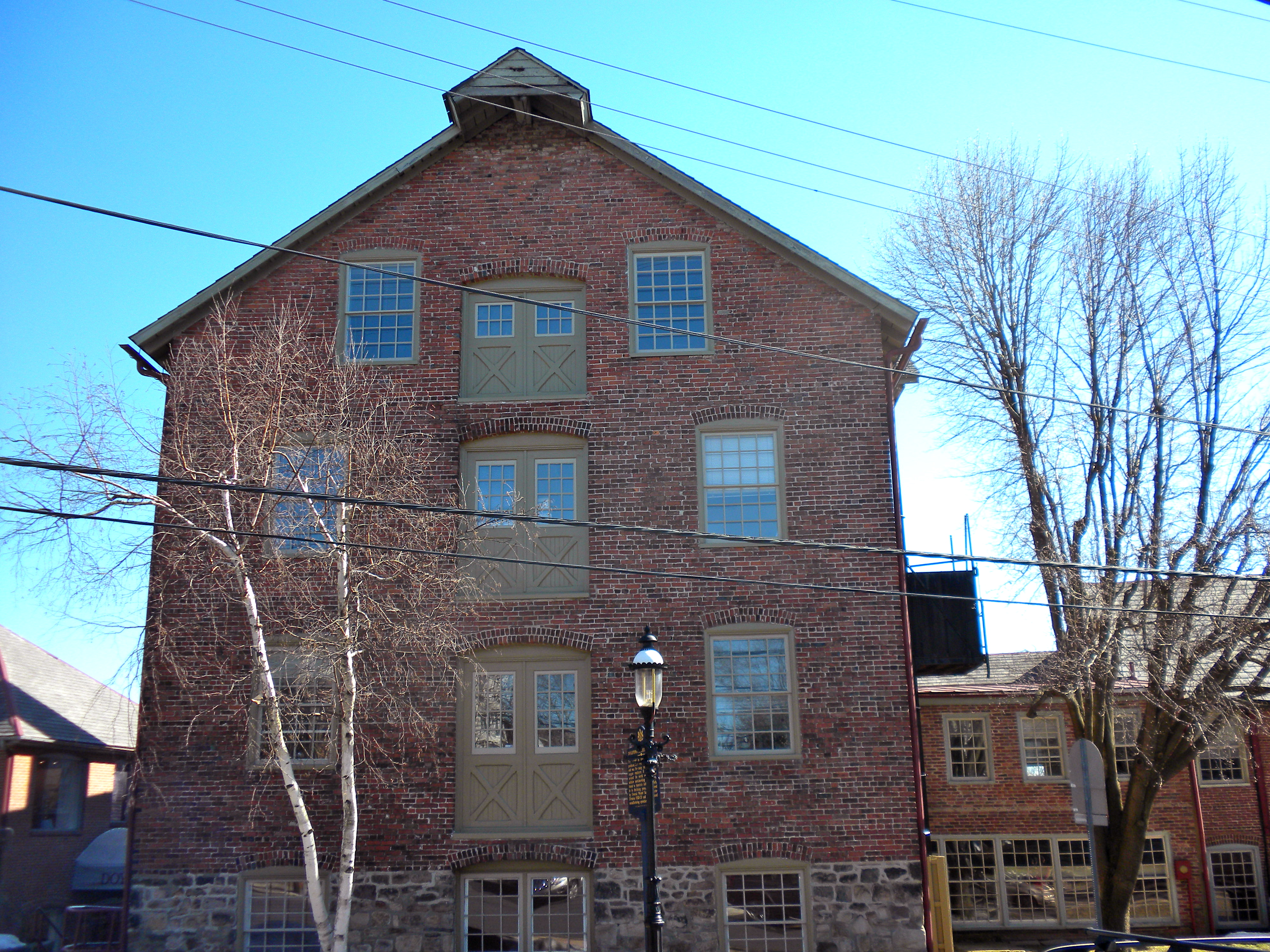
- Doylestown Agricultural Works, Shaw Historic District, March 2010

- Location within Pennsylvania Location within the United States
- Location: Bounded by S. Main, Ashland, Bridge, and S. Clinton Sts., Doylestown, Pennsylvania
- Coordinates: 40°18′35″N 75°08′14″W
- Area: 1.9 acres (0.77 ha)
- Built: 1833-1914
- Architectural style: Late Victorian
- NRHP reference No.: 79002172
- Added to NRHP: December 17, 1979

The Shaw Historic District, also known as the Francis B. Shaw Block Historic District, is a national historic district that is located in Doylestown, Bucks County, Pennsylvania.

Added to the National Register of Historic Places in 1979, it was incorporated into the Doylestown Historic District in 1985.

== History and architectural features ==
This district includes seven contributing buildings that are located in a residential and industrial area of Doylestown. The block was developed between 1833 and 1914, and includes the Bryan House (c. 1833), the Clemens Double House (pre-1874), the Goodman House (c. 1835), the Kulp House (c. 1849), the Late Victorian-style Rhodes House (1891), the Rhodes Livery Stable (1914), and the Doylestown Agricultural Works complex (1867, 1914). The Doylestown Agricultural Works was rebuilt after a fire in 1913; it closed in 1968.
