= James-Lorah House =

Historic house in Pennsylvania, United States

- U.S. National Register of Historic Places
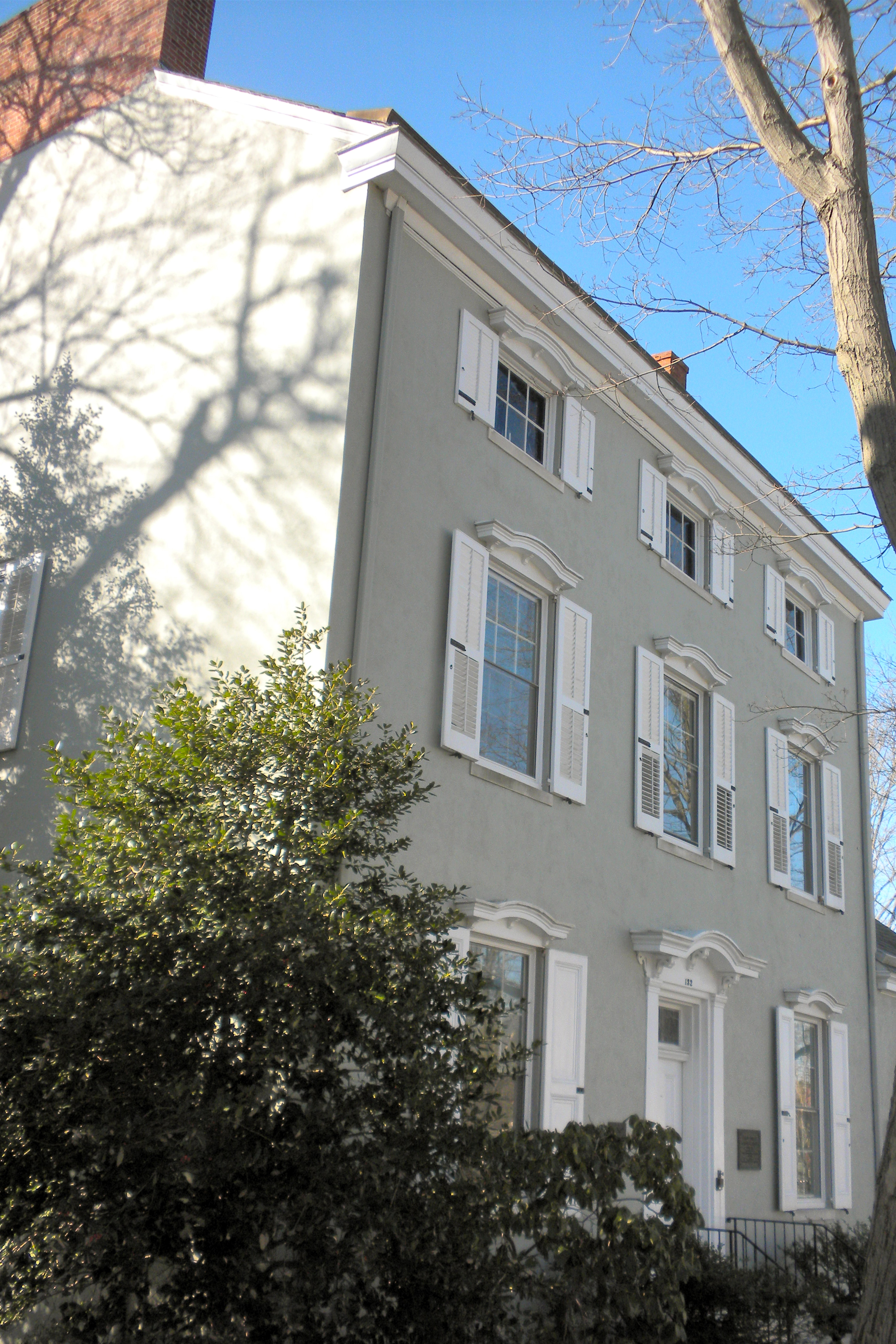
- James-Lorah House, March 2010

- Location within Pennsylvania Location within the United States
- Location: 132 N. Main St., Doylestown, Pennsylvania
- Coordinates: 40°18′46″N 75°7′52″W
- Area: 0.5 acres (0.20 ha)
- Built: 1844
- Built by: Martin, Fred A.
- Architectural style: Late Victorian
- NRHP reference No.: 72001096
- Added to NRHP: October 17, 1972

The James-Lorah House, also known as the Judge Chapman House and VIA House, is an historic home that is located in Doylestown, Bucks County, Pennsylvania, United States.

It was added to the National Register of Historic Places in 1972.

== History and architectural features ==
Built circa 1844, this historic structure is a 2 1/2-story, stuccoed townhouse with a medium gable roof. It has a 1 1/2-story rear wing with a high gable roof and end chimney. The house features eyebrow windows and marble entrance steps. It was built for Henry Chapman, who served in the U.S. House of Representatives. It was the birthplace of Henry Chapman Mercer on June 24, 1856.
