= Pugh Dungan House =

- U.S. National Register of Historic Places
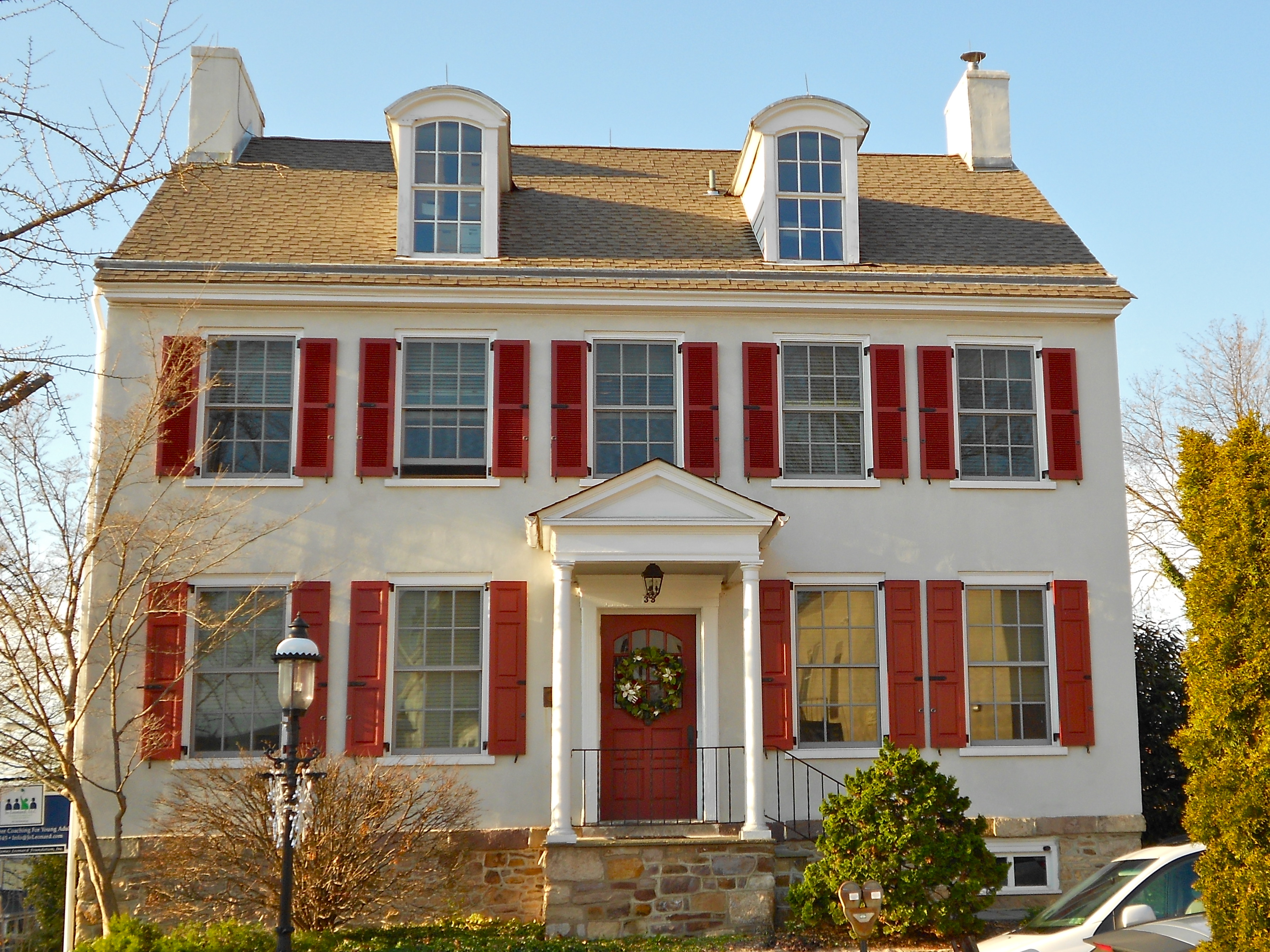
- Pugh Dungan House, December 2011

- Location within Pennsylvania Location within the United States
- Location: 33 W. Court St., Doylestown, Pennsylvania
- Coordinates: 40°18′37″N 75°7′54″W
- Area: 0.4 acres (0.16 ha)
- Built: c. 1830
- Built by: Dungan, Pugh
- Architectural style: Federal
- NRHP reference No.: 80003430
- Added to NRHP: March 20, 1980

Pugh Dungan House is a historic home located in Doylestown, Bucks County, Pennsylvania. It was built about 1830, and is a 2 1/2-story, five-bay, stuccoed brick and fieldstone dwelling in the Federal style. It features a single bay, pedimented portico supported by Doric order columns. A two-story rear porch was added in the mid- to late-19th century.

It was added to the National Register of Historic Places in 1980.
