= Fonthill, Mercer Museum and Moravian Pottery and Tile Works =

- U.S. National Register of Historic Places
- U.S. National Historic Landmark District
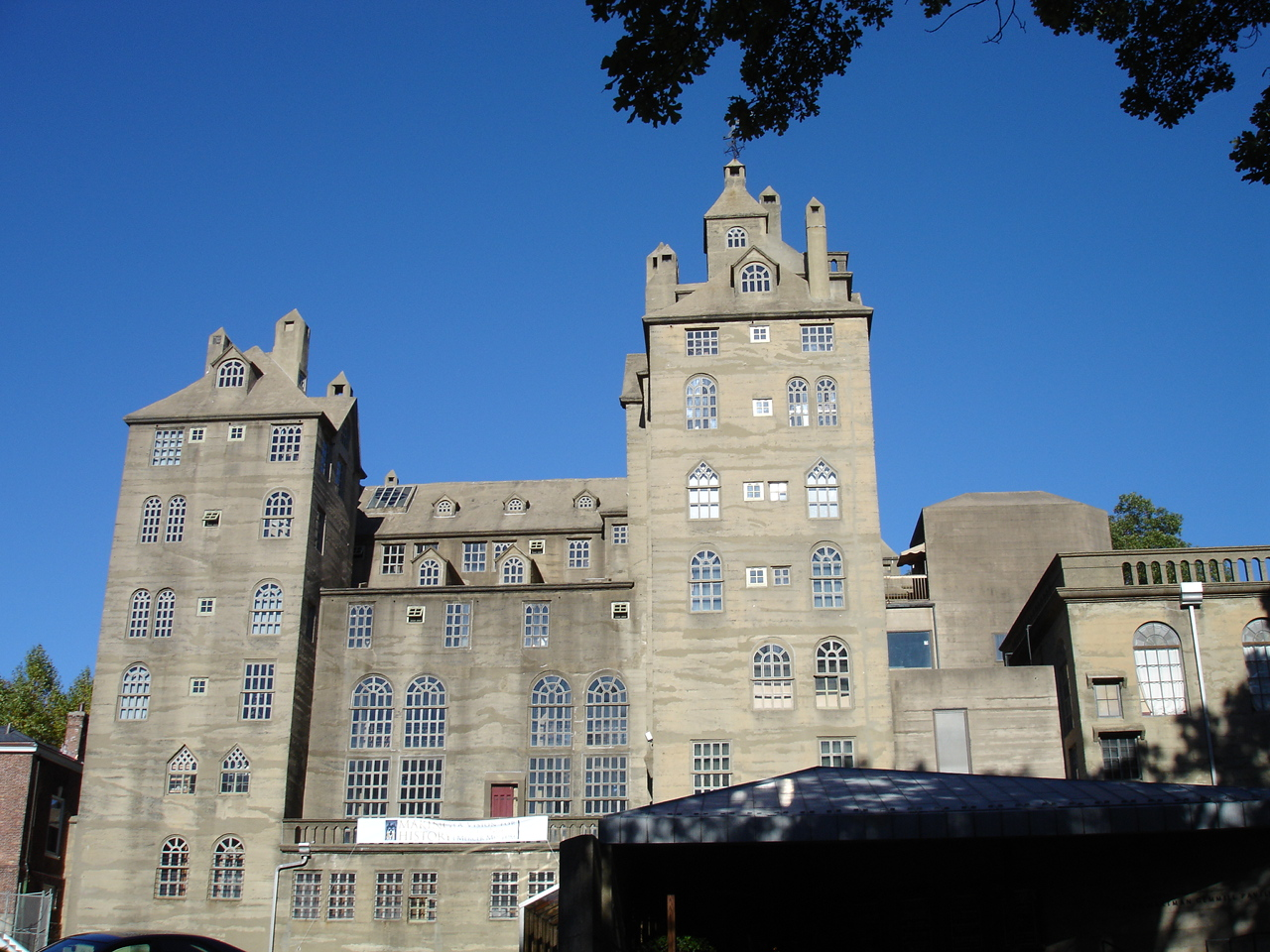
- Mercer Museum, October 2006

- Location within Pennsylvania Location within the United States
- Location: Court St. and Swamp Rd. and Pine and Ashland Sts., Doylestown, Pennsylvania
- Coordinates: 40°19′01″N 75°07′30″W
- Built: 1907
- Built by: Mercer, Henry C.
- Architectural style: Colonial Revival, Other, Neo-Georgian
- NRHP reference No.: 85002366
- Added to NRHP: February 4, 1985

Fonthill, Mercer Museum and Moravian Pottery and Tile Works is a National Historic Landmark District located at Doylestown, Bucks County, Pennsylvania. It consists of three properties built by Henry Chapman Mercer (1856-1930) in a distinctive application of the principles of the Arts and Crafts movement, which are also notable for the early use of poured concrete: Fonthill, the Mercer Museum, and the Moravian Pottery and Tile Works. All three are now museum properties of the Bucks County Historical Society. The landmark designation for the group was made in 1985; each property is also individually listed on the National Register of Historic Places.

== Background ==
Henry Chapman Mercer was a native of Doylestown, who was educated as a lawyer. He never practiced law formally, and eventually landed a job as a curator at the University of Pennsylvania Museum. Concerned about the rise of industrialization, he began collecting hand-made artifacts and implements of American life and industry, and also investigated Germany pottery and tile-making techniques. Influenced by the rising Arts and Crafts Movement, he founded the Moravian Pottery and Tile Works in his hometown in 1898. Its tiles met with great success, and have been widely used in the United States. In 1907 he began construction of Fonthill, one of the earliest uses of reinforced poured concrete in the United States. Mercer designed it, as well as the current Mercer Museum, using an organic process. Both of those buildings, as well as the current surviving tile works building, use poured reinforced concrete as the primary building material.

== Fonthill ==
Fonthill is located north of the town center of Doylestown, on the west side of East Court Street, just south of the tile works. Its appearance is loosely based on European medieval castles, and has walls of concrete 2 feet (0.61 m) thick. The exterior is adorned by decorative tiles, the interior is furnished and decorated with Chapman's collections. The house was completed in 1912. It is open for tours by appointment.

== Mercer Museum ==
The Mercer Museum is located just southeast of the town center, at East Ashland and Green Streets. Its exterior is similar in inspiration to that of Fonthill, but features more numerous exterior protrusions, giving it a more fortified appearance. The interior includes a large open space surrounded by a ramp of galleries, in which Mercer's collection of agricultural and industrial implements are displayed in alcoves and nooks. Completed in 1916, it was augmented in the 1930s by a similarly styled library addition.

== Moravian Pottery and Tile Works ==
The tile works complex is located just north of Fonthill, off Swamp Road. Built in 1911-12, it resembles a medieval cloister, with an arched colonnade surrounding a central courtyard. The main portion of the structure is 2-1/2 stories in height, and houses five kilns. The facility continues to actively produce tile, using molds created by Chapman.

== See also ==
- List of National Historic Landmarks in Pennsylvania
- National Register of Historic Places listings in Bucks County, Pennsylvania
