= Henry Chapman Mercer =

Archeologist and designer in the US

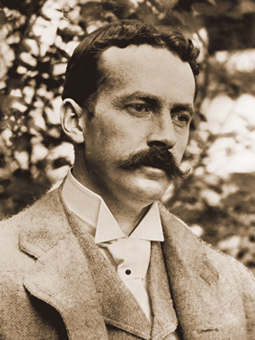
- Born: June 24, 1856; Doylestown, Pennsylvania, United States
- Died: March 9, 1930 (aged 73); Bucks County, Pennsylvania, United States
- Known for: Tile
- Movement: Arts and Crafts Movement influence

Henry Chapman Mercer (June 24, 1856 – March 9, 1930) was an American archeologist, collector and tile-maker, who was the designer of three distinctive poured concrete structures: Fonthill, his home; the Moravian Pottery and Tile Works; and the Mercer Museum.

== Family and early life ==
Henry Mercer was born in Doylestown, Pennsylvania, on June 24, 1856, to Mary Rebecca Chapman Mercer and William Mercer. The Mercer family was wealthy and locally prominent; his father, a grandson of Founding Father John Francis Mercer, was a former naval officer who became a judge and gentleman farmer, and his mother was a daughter of congressman Henry Chapman. Mercer's travels, education, and business pursuits would be largely financed by his wealthy maternal aunt Elizabeth, the widow of Timothy Bigelow Lawrence (son of industrialist Abbott Lawrence).

Mercer had two siblings: William (1858–1939) and Elizabeth (1858–1919). His brother also was an artist, training in sculpture at the Pennsylvania Academy of Fine Arts and marrying into the wealthy Dana family. He lived near his brother in Doylestown and erected Aldie mansion, a source of conflict between the brothers. His sister married the Austrian Baron Hubert Fidler von Isarborn and spent the rest of her life in Europe.

== Career ==
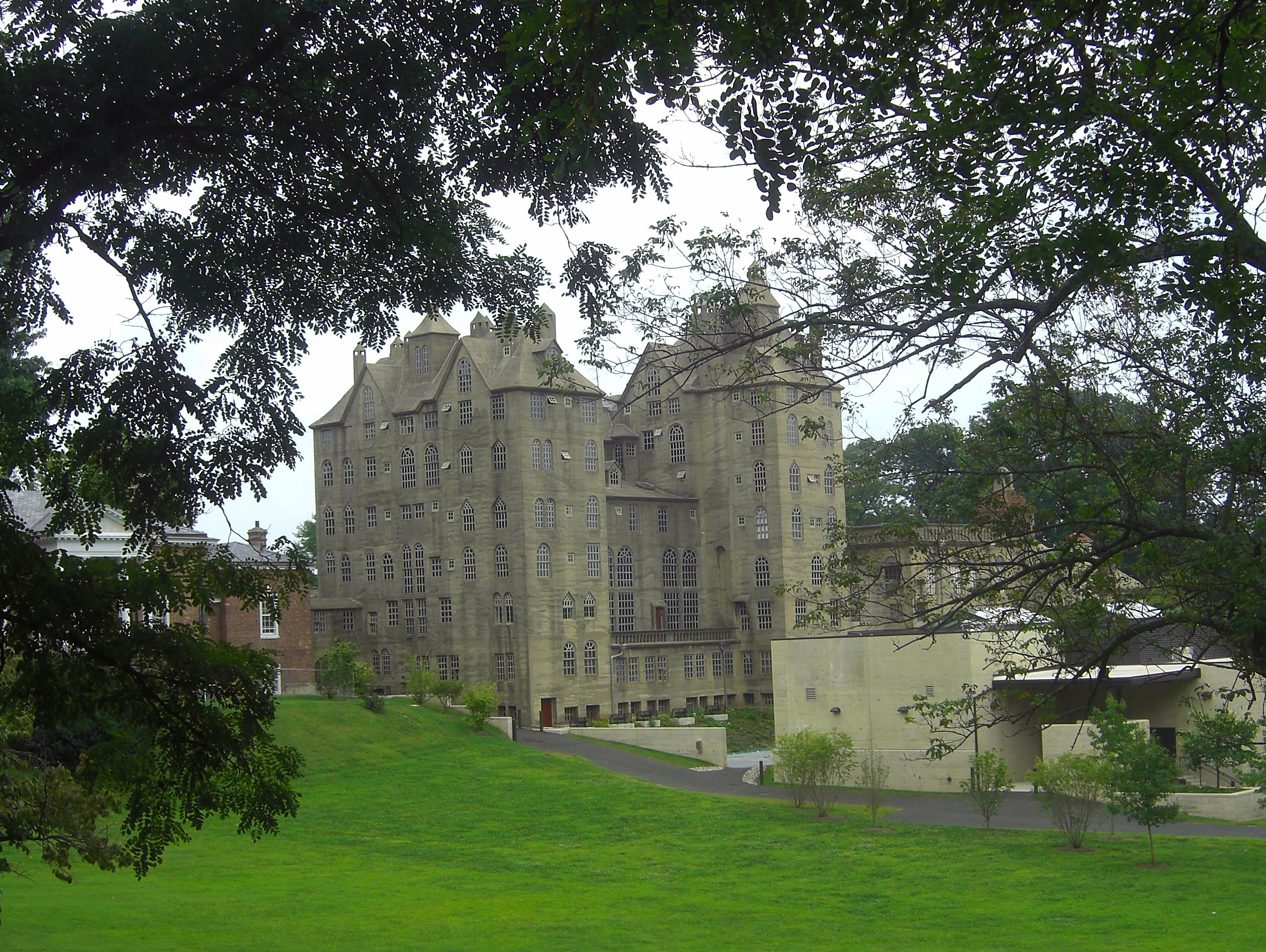
The Mercer Museum in Doylestown, Pennsylvania

Mercer first traveled to Europe in 1870 with his aunt. He attended Harvard University between 1875 and 1879, obtaining a liberal arts degree. Mercer went on to study law at the University of Pennsylvania Law School between 1880 and 1881, and he read law with the firm of Freedley and Hollingsworth. The same year he began studying at the University of Pennsylvania, he became a founding member of the Bucks County Historical Society.

Mercer, however, never practiced law; he was admitted to the Philadelphia County Bar on November 9, 1881, but departed for Europe the same month. From 1881 to 1889, he traveled extensively through France and Germany.

The University of Pennsylvania Museum appointed Mercer as the Curator of American and Prehistoric Archaeology in the early 1890s. He was elected to the American Philosophical Society in 1895. Leaving his position with the Museum in the late 1890s, Mercer devoted himself to finding old American artifacts and learning about German pottery. Mercer believed that American society was being destroyed by industrialism, which inspired his search for American artifacts. Mercer founded Moravian Pottery and Tile Works in 1898 after apprenticing himself to a Pennsylvania German potter. He was also influenced by the American Arts and Crafts Movement.

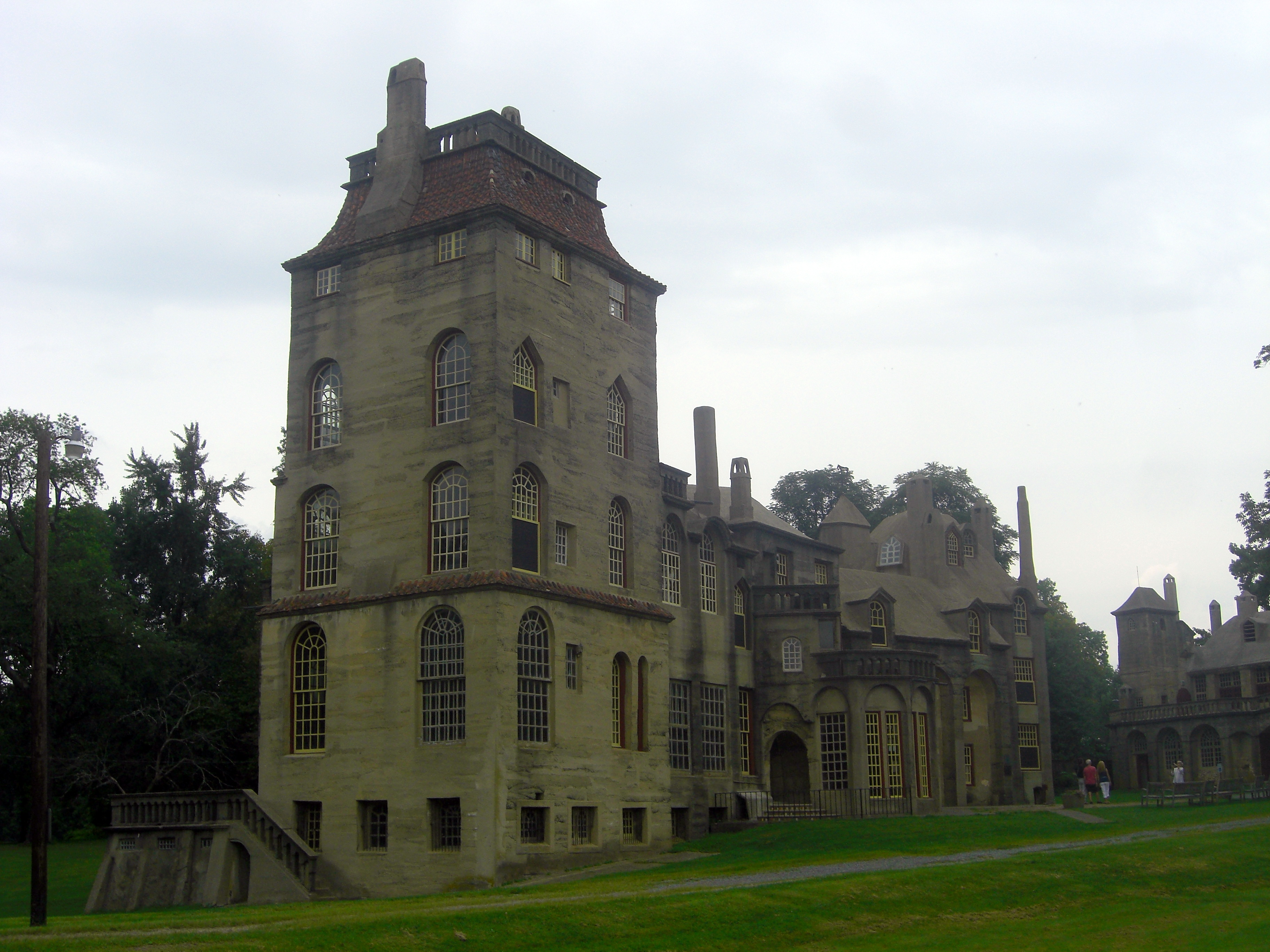
Fonthill Castle

Mercer is well known for his research and books about ancient tool making, his ceramic tile creations, and his engineering and architecture. He was among the paleontologists who investigated Port Kennedy Bone Cave. He wrote extensively on his interests, which included archaeology, early tool making, German stove plates, and ceramics. He also published a collection of tales of the supernatural, November Night Tales in 1928. He assembled the collection of early American tools now housed in the Mercer Museum. Mercer's tiles are used in the floor of the Pennsylvania State Capitol Building in Harrisburg, Pennsylvania and in many other noteworthy buildings and houses. In the Pennsylvania State Capitol, Mercer created a series of mosaic images for the floor of the building. The series of four hundred mosaics trace the history of the Commonwealth of Pennsylvania from prehistoric times, and is the largest single collection of Mercer's tiles. Other collections of tiles by Mercer can be found at Kykuit, the Rockefeller estate in Pocantico Hills, New York; Grauman's Chinese Theatre in Hollywood, California; the Casino at Monte Carlo in Monaco; the St. Louis Public Library; and the former Morton (Richmond) High School Building in Richmond, Indiana.

Besides making mosaics, Mercer also painted, drew, and wrote poetry. Sometimes, he blended these interests together, such as in the pastel painting October, which also showcases his fascination with rural life.

Mercer was an outspoken opponent of the plume trade.

Henry Ford stated that the Mercer museum was the only museum worth visiting in the United States, and the Mercer Museum was apparently Henry Ford's inspiration for his own museum, the Henry Ford Museum, located in Dearborn, Michigan. The Mercer Museum houses over forty thousand artifacts from early American society. Mercer died on March 9, 1930, at Fonthill, the house he designed and constructed from reinforced concrete in 1908–1912.

The Bucks County Historical Society now owns Fonthill, which is open to the public, and the Mercer Museum. The Moravian Pottery and Tile Works is owned by the Bucks County Department of Parks & Recreation and operated as a working history museum by The TileWorks of Bucks County, a non-profit organization. These three buildings make up "the Mercer Mile". All three buildings were designed and constructed by Henry Mercer in the early part of the 20th century.

== Publications ==
- The Lenape Stone, or the Indian and the Mammoth (1885)
- The Hill-Caves of Yucatan (1895)
- The Antiquity of Man in the Delaware Valley and the Eastern United States (1897)
- Guidebook to the Tiled Pavement in the Pennsylvania State Capitol (1908)
- The Bible in Iron (1914)
- November Night Tales (1928)
- Ancient Carpenters' Tools (1929)

== Gallery ==
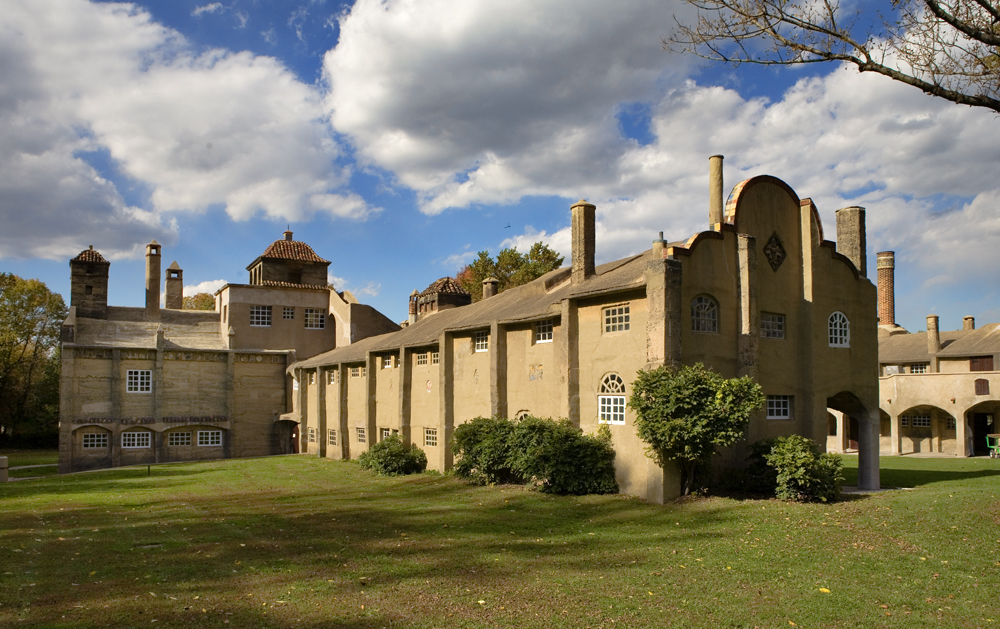
Moravian Pottery and Tile Works, Doylestown, Pennsylvania.

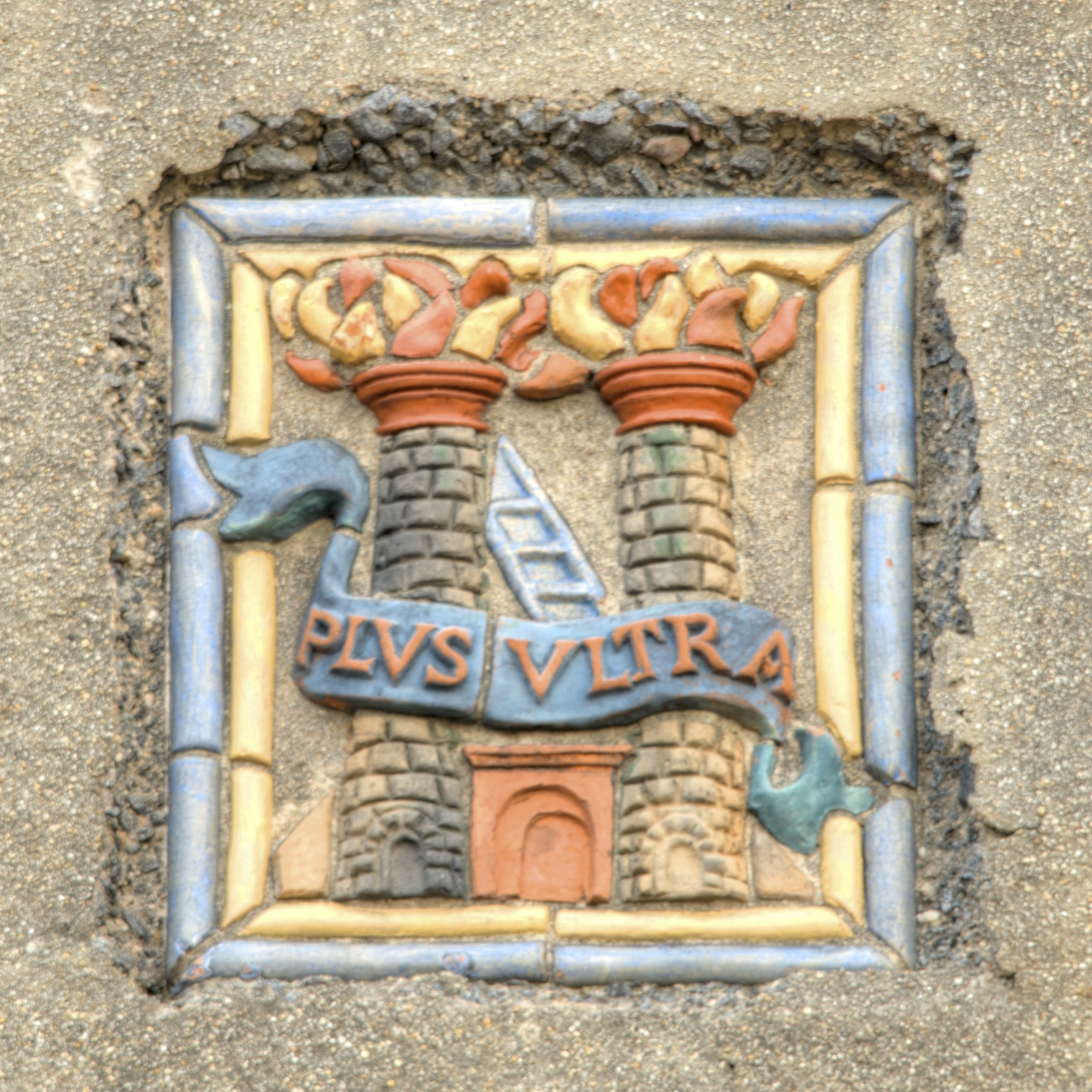
Tile on wall of the Moravian Pottery and Tile Works

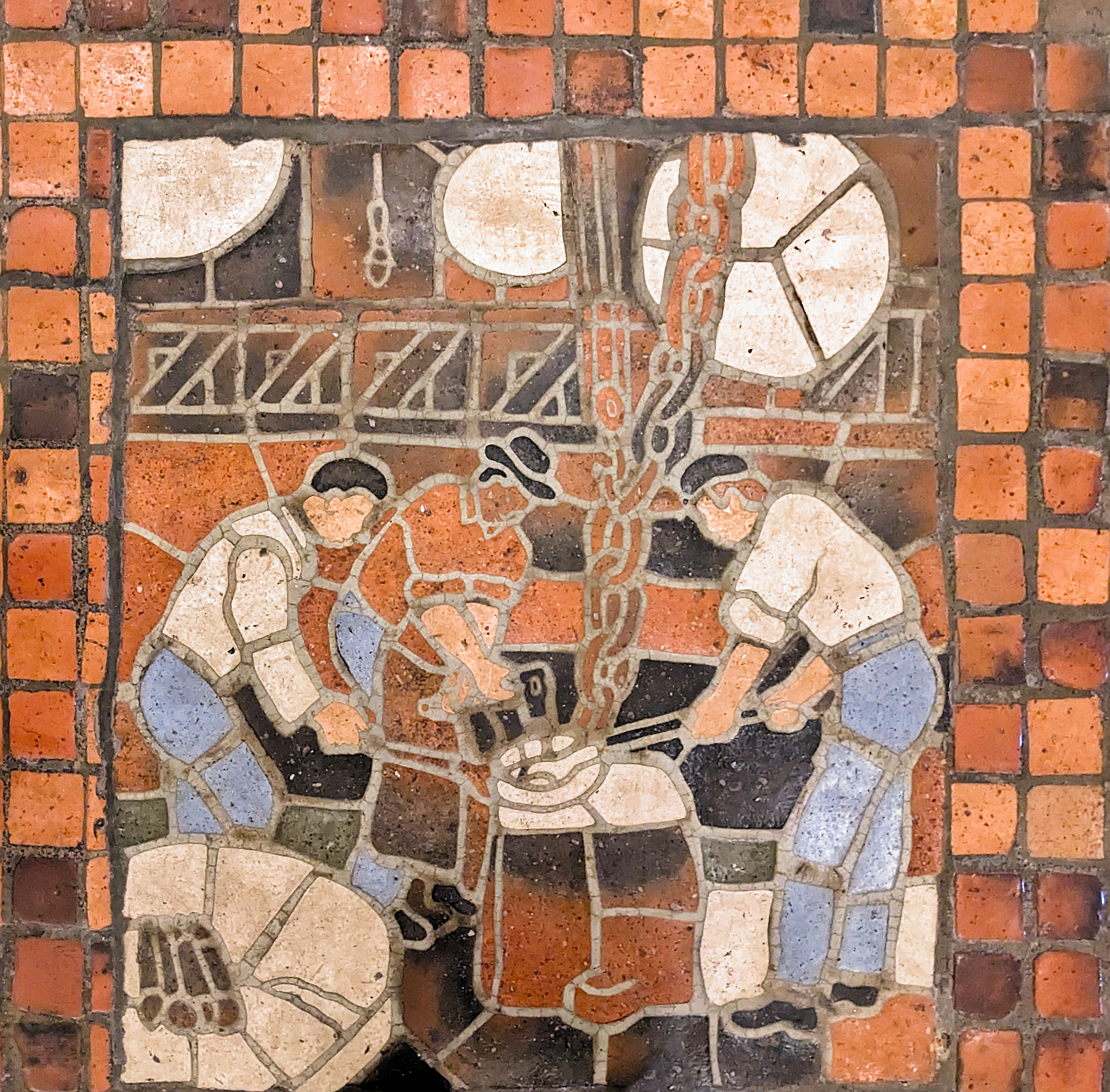
Steel industry mosaic (1902–06), Rotunda, Pennsylvania State Capitol, Harrisburg, Pennsylvania.

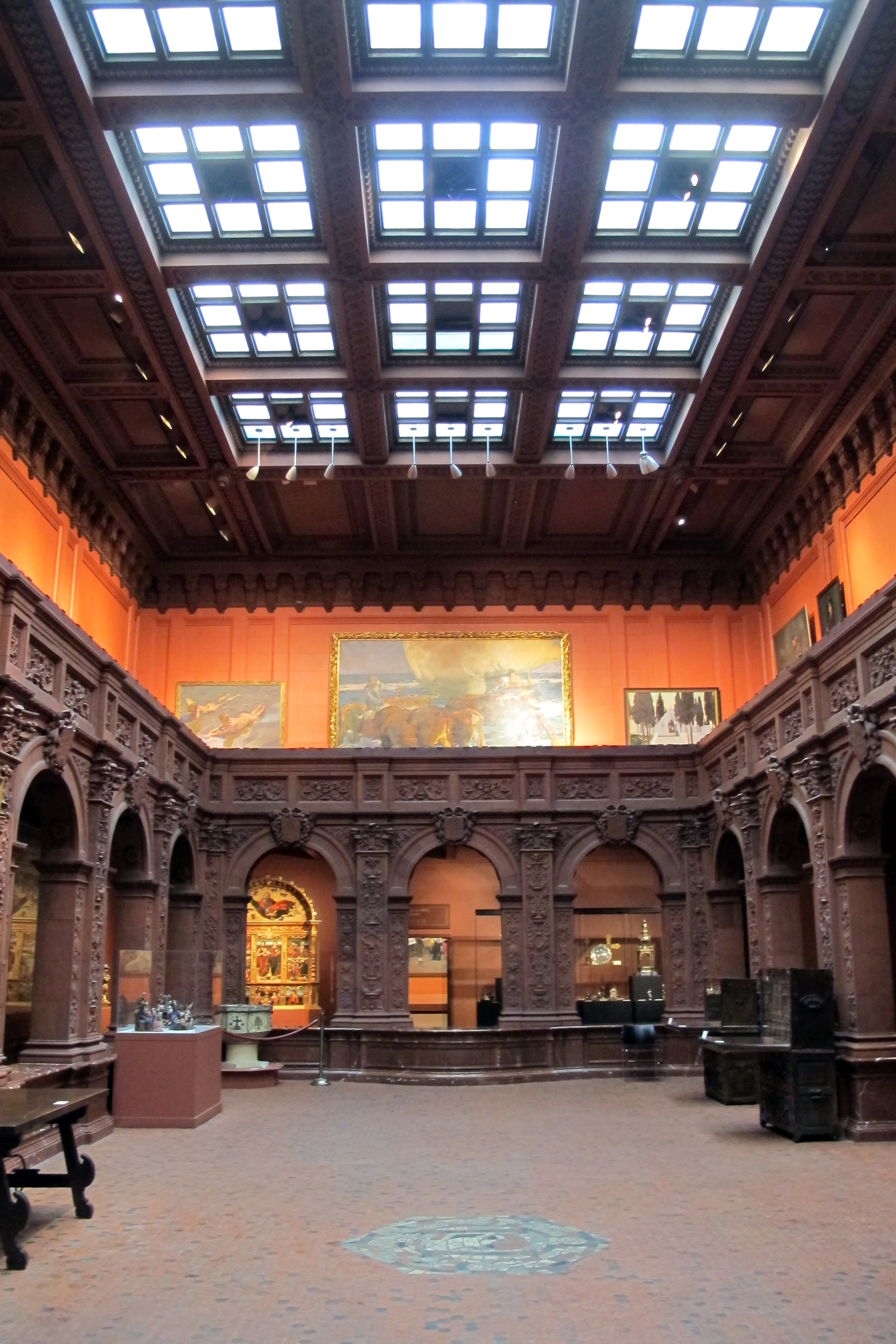
Corte Grande, (1904–08), Hispanic Society of America, New York City.

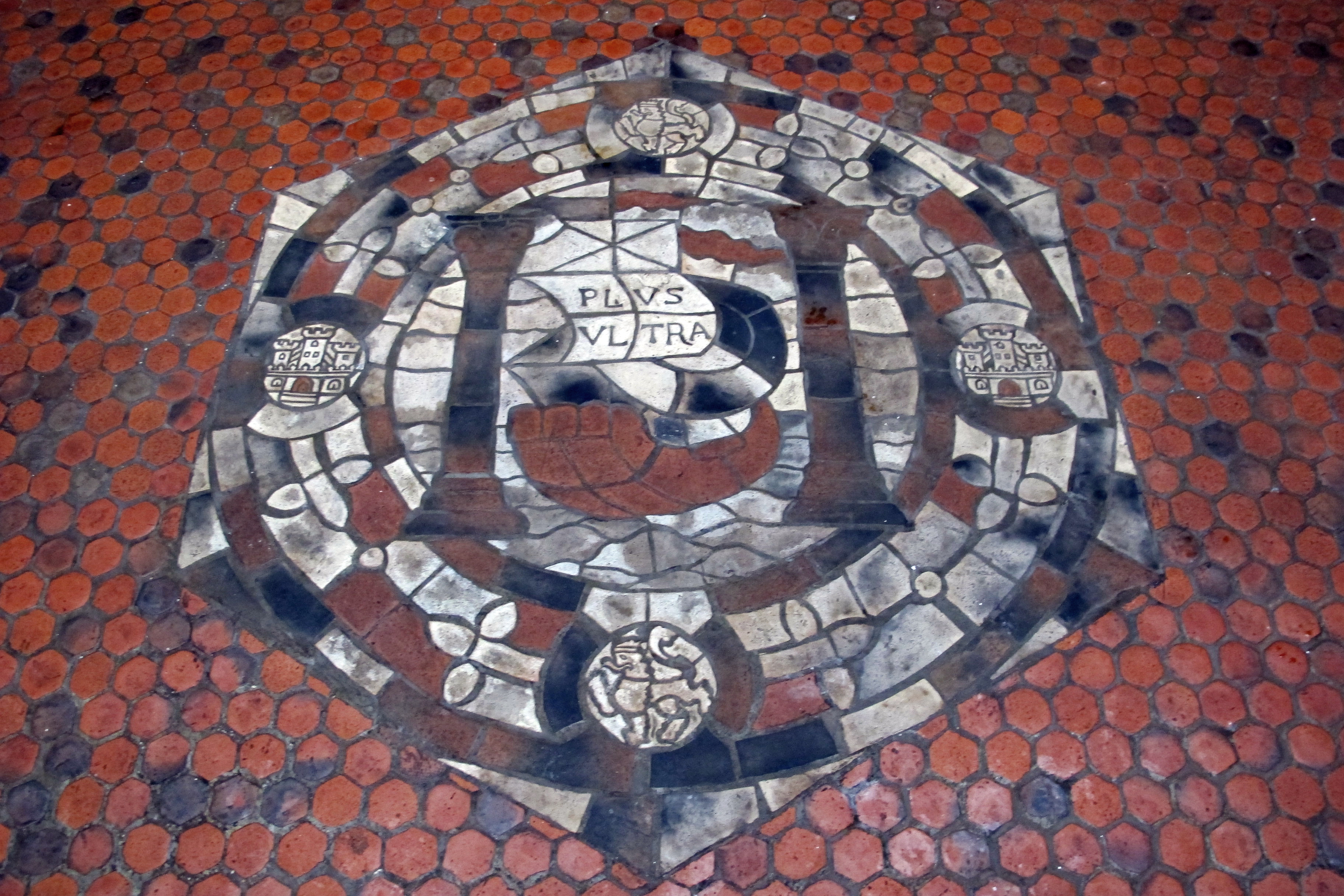
Center mosaic (1904–08), Corte Grande, Hispanic Society of America, New York City.

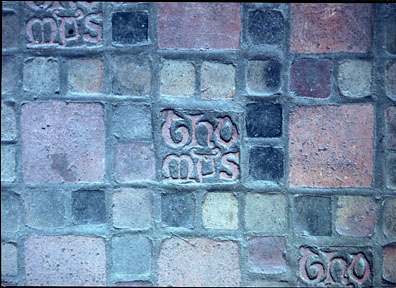
Vestibule mosaic (1908), Bryn Mawr College Deanery, Bryn Mawr, Pennsylvania.

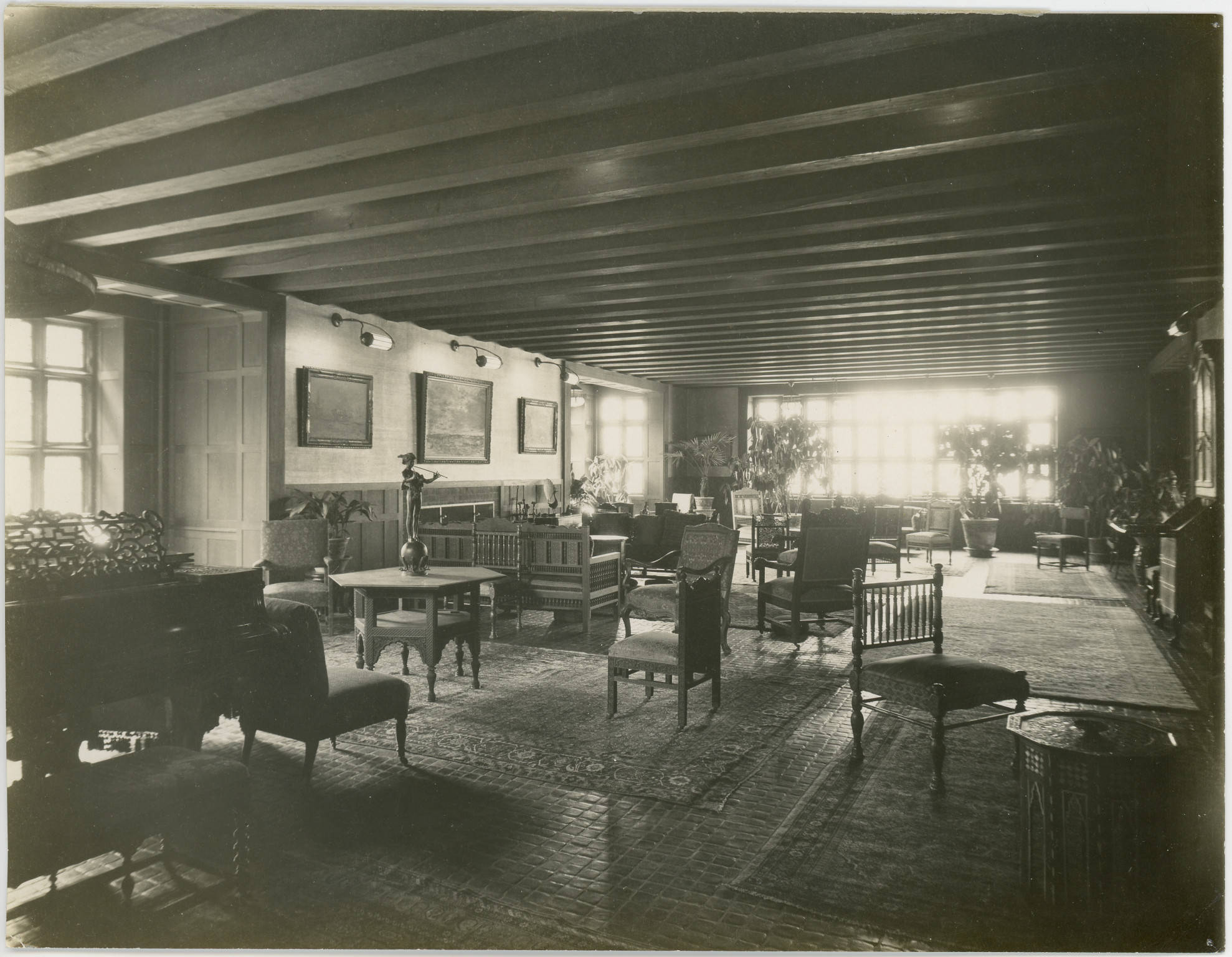
Dorothy Vernon Room (1908, demolished 1968), Bryn Mawr College Deanery, Bryn Mawr, Pennsylvania, Lockwood de Forest, designer.

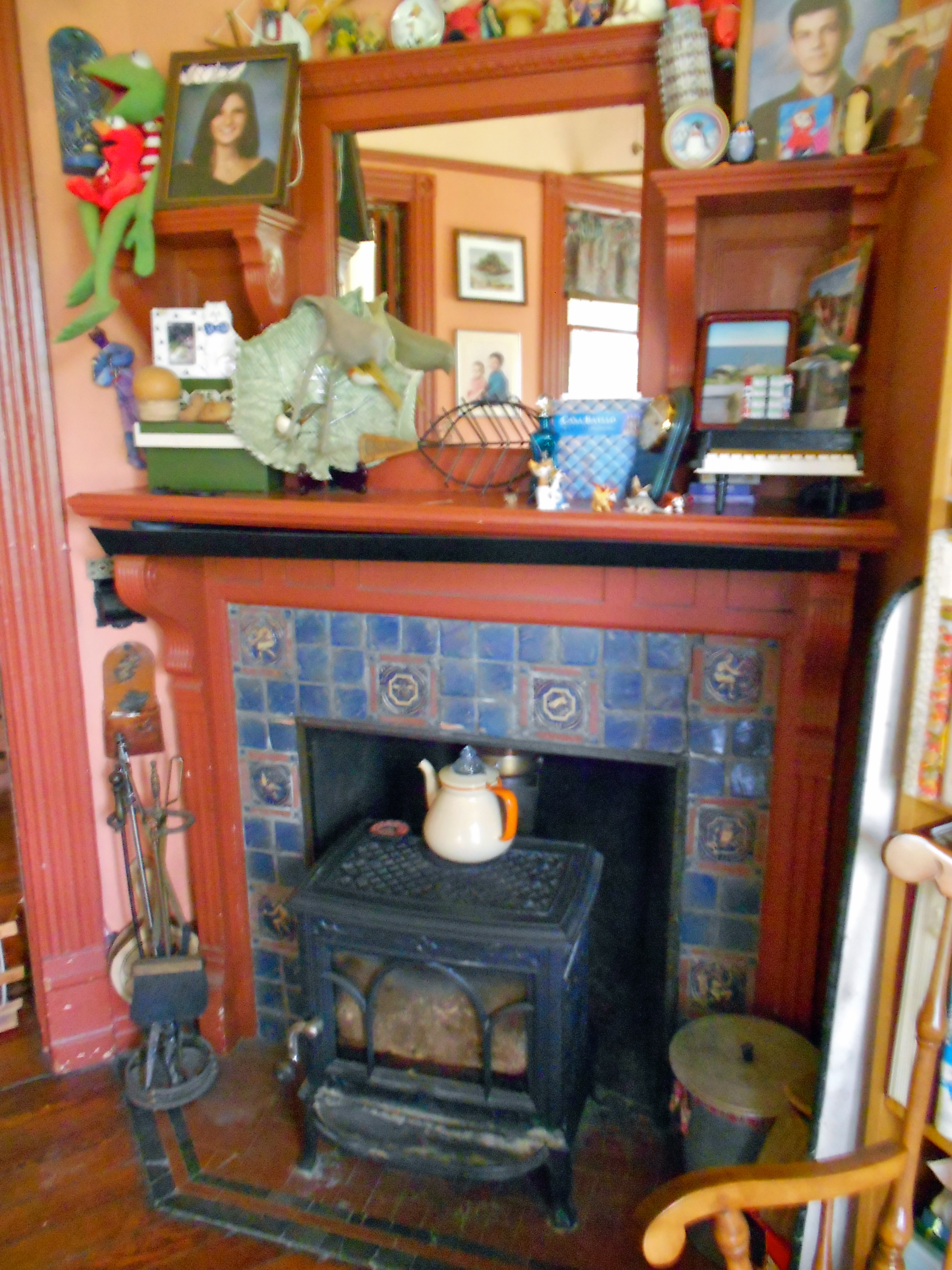
Fireplace surround (c. 1920), Idlewild, Media, Pennsylvania.

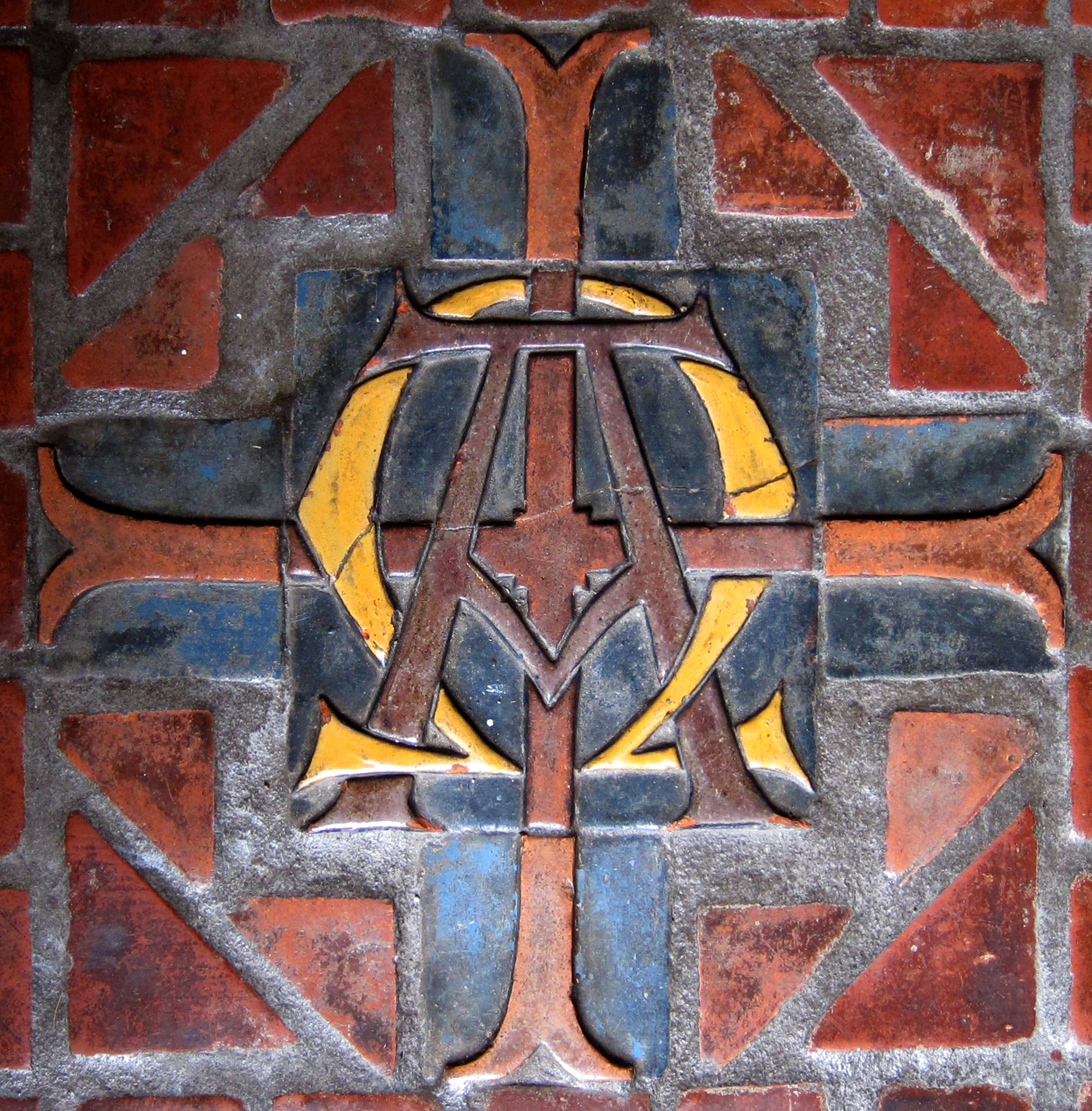
Alpha and Omega mosaic (c. 1925), Narthex, Church of St. James the Greater, Bristol, Pennsylvania.

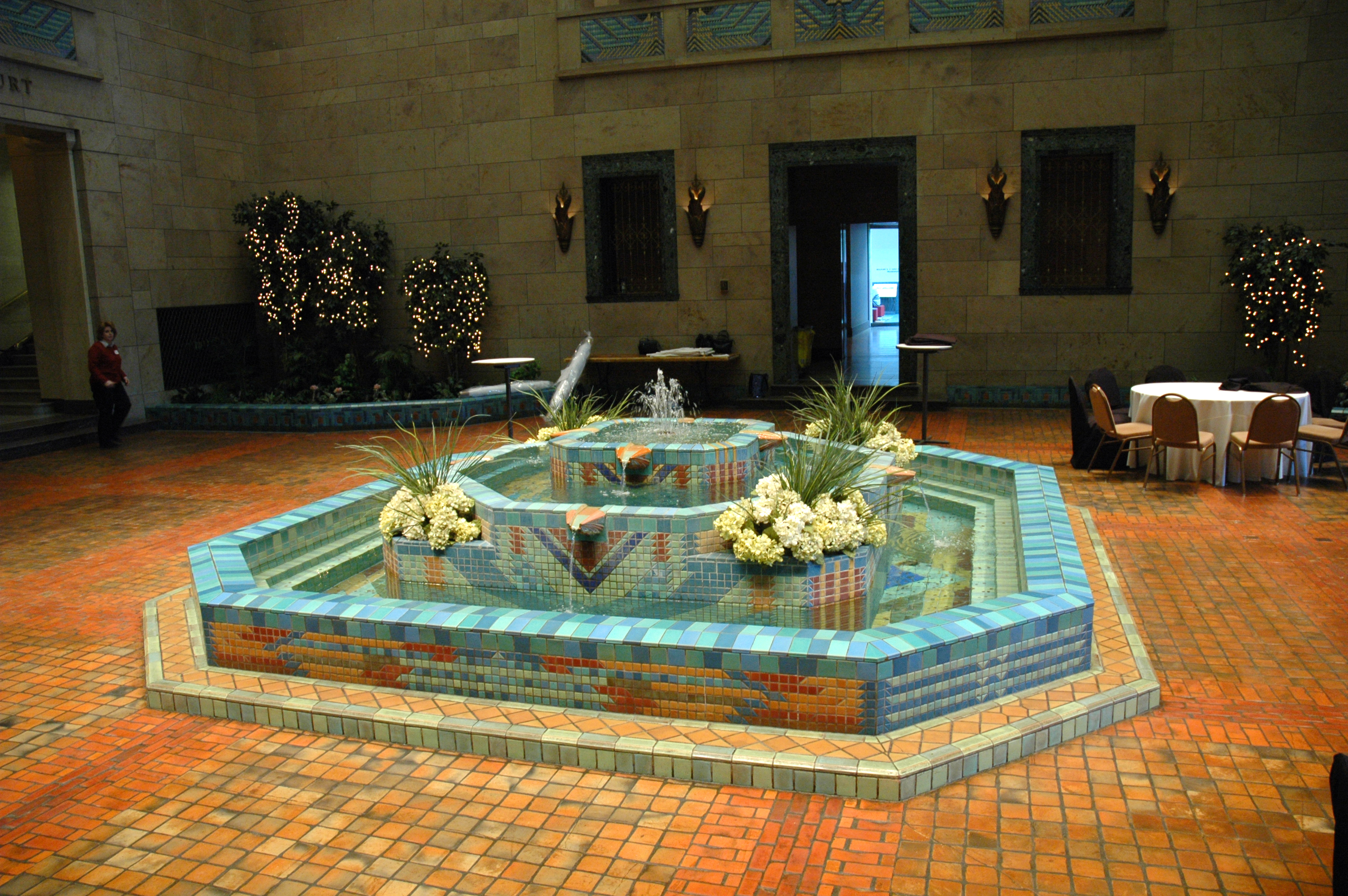
Fountain Court, Joslyn Art Museum (1931), Omaha, Nebraska.
