= Mercer Museum =

- U.S. National Register of Historic Places
- U.S. National Historic Landmark District – Contributing property
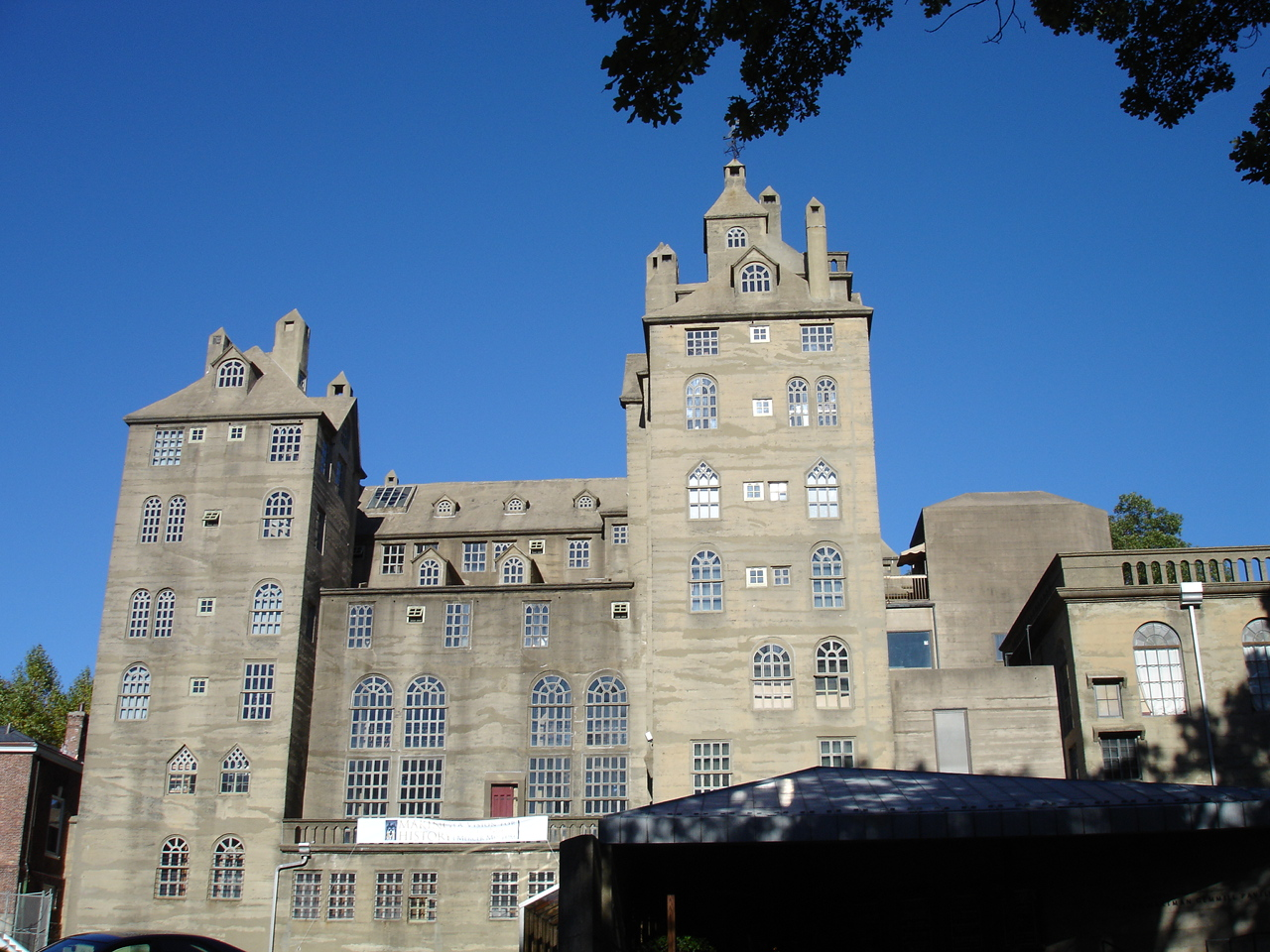
- Mercer Museum in Doylestown, Pennsylvania

- Location within Pennsylvania Location within the United States
- Location: 84 S. Pine St., Doylestown, Pennsylvania, U.S.
- Coordinates: 40°18′28″N 75°7′38″W
- Built: 1904
- Architect: Dr. Henry Mercer
- Architectural style: Colonial Revival
- Part of: Fonthill, Mercer Museum, and Moravian Pottery and Tile Works (ID85002366)
- NRHP reference No.: 72001097

Significant dates
- Added to NRHP: March 16, 1972
- Designated NHLDCP: February 4, 1985

The Mercer Museum is a museum located in Doylestown, Pennsylvania. The Bucks County Historical Society operates the Mercer Museum, the Research Library, and Fonthill Castle, the former home of the museum's founder, archeologist Henry Chapman Mercer.

The museum was individually listed on the National Register of Historic Places in 1972, and was later included in a National Historic Landmark District along with the Moravian Pottery and Tile Works and Fonthill. These three structures are the only poured-in-place concrete structures built by Mercer.

== History ==
Sample of tile work from the on-site production facility in the Mercer Museum

Henry Mercer was a gentleman anthropologist. On a cruise up the Ruhr in early adulthood, Mercer was impressed by the eclipse of artisanal culture by industrial production, and resolved himself to preserving artifacts of preindustrial life.

During the late 19th and early 20th centuries, Mercer collected pre-industrial hand tools and other implements of the past. He believed that the story of human progress and accomplishments was told by the tools and objects that people used and saw these time-honored crafts slowly disappearing from memory.

Mercer personally designed plans for a museum to house his collection, six stories tall and cast of poured-in-place concrete. Mercer's museum was completed in 1916.

In addition to tools, it displays furnishings of early America, carriages, stove plates, a gallows, antique fire engines, a whaleboat, and the Lenape Stone. The Mercer Museum Library, which houses the Bucks County Historical Society's archive of historical research materials, is located on its third floor.

In June 2011, construction was completed on a new, extensive visitors center at the front of the museum.

== Construction ==
The museum is one of three poured-in-place concrete structures built by Mercer. The others include his home Fonthill and the Moravian Pottery and Tile Works, both of which are located one mile from the museum.

Mercer decided to build with concrete after the Great Boston Fire of 1872 destroyed his aunt's prized collection of medieval armor, which had been stored in wooden structures. He did not want his own collections to suffer the same fate.

Locals mocked his choice of building materials, but on completion of the museum, he lit a bonfire on its roof to prove that it was fireproof. Mercer's museum was an early demonstration of rebar-reinforced concrete as a structural material.

== Gallery ==
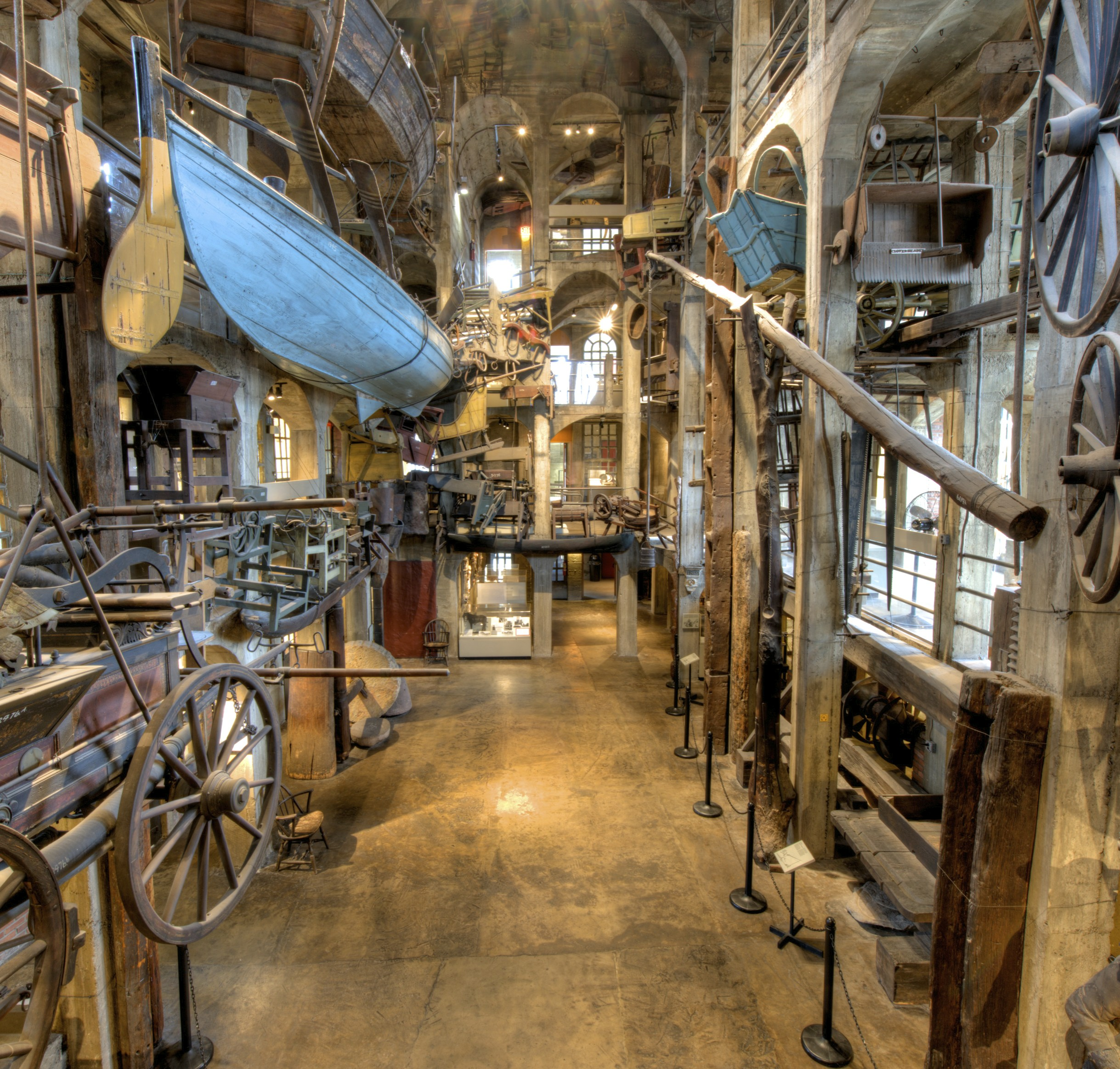
Inside the Mercer Museum. Pieces hang from the ceiling and walls.

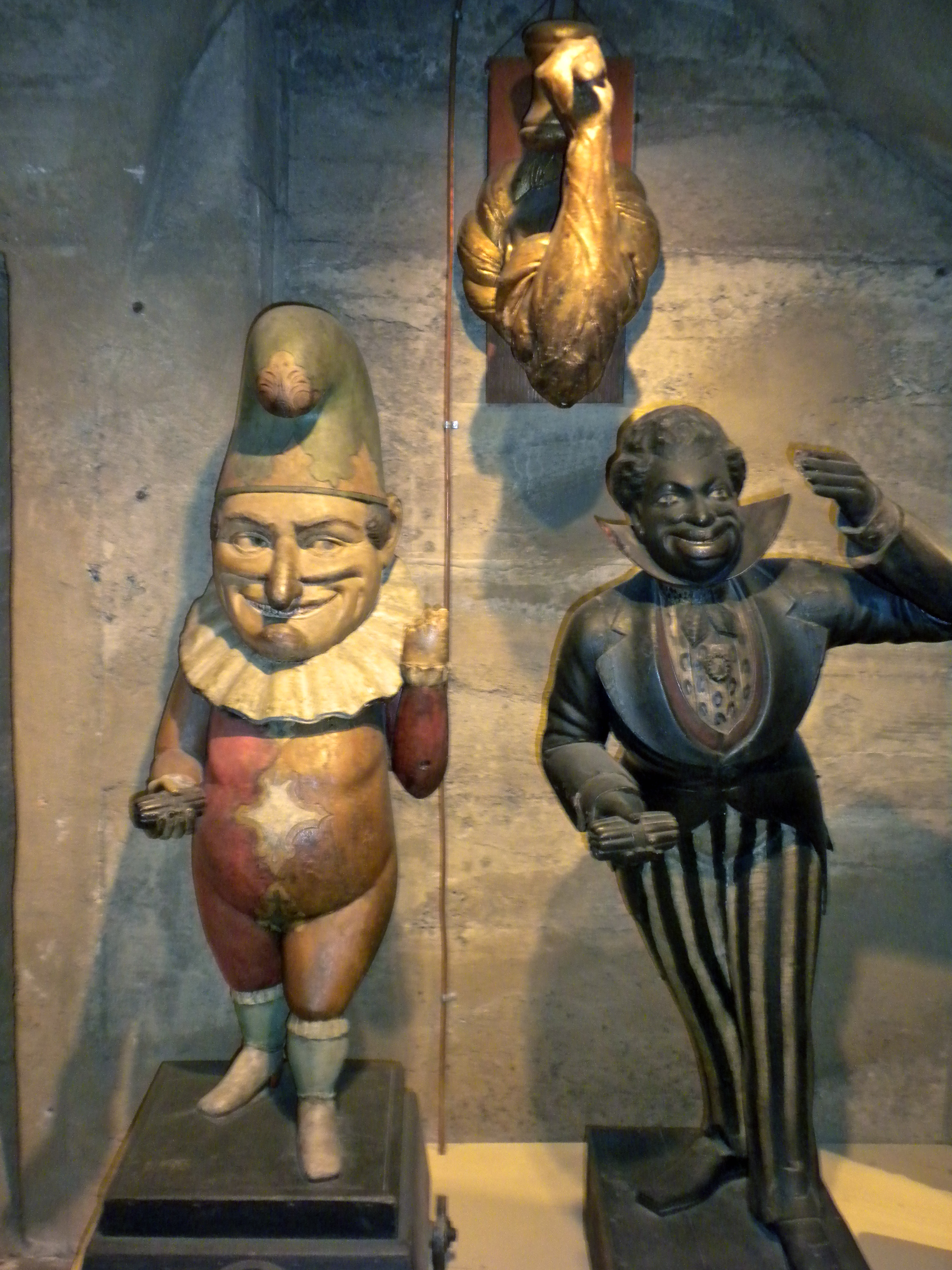
19th century cigar store figures
