= Holly Oak gorget =

Shell artifact believed to be an archaeological forgery

The Holly Oak Gorget or Holly Oak Pendant is an artifact made from a section of shell that is engraved with the image of an extinct woolly mammoth reportedly found in Holly Oak, Delaware and initially identified as an example of Paleoindian art. Purported to have been a gorget carved during the Pleistocene, this object is now widely believed to be an archaeological forgery.

== History ==
The Holly Oak Gorget was claimed to have been found in 1864 near the railroad station in Holly Oak. The object was reportedly found by Hilborne T. Cresson in 1864, but was not brought to the attention of the scientific community until December 1889 or the public until February 1890. The supposed discovery of the gorget by Cresson coincides directly with the discovery of another depiction of a woolly mammoth, in France; while excavating the La Madeleine rock shelter in 1864 Édouard Lartet discovered a clear depiction of a woolly mammoth on a fragment of mammoth tusk, providing evidence that humans and mammoths might once have co-existed in Europe.

Once the Holly Oak gorget had been introduced to the scientific community and the public at large, the shell was put aside and rarely mentioned in the archaeological literature of the time. It was displayed at the Peabody Museum, the Smithsonian Institution and the International Expositions of Madrid and Chicago before fading from the public eye, only to be resurrected in the 1970s when its authenticity was once again subject to debate.

== Description ==
The object is a single piece of whelk shell that has an engraving of a mammoth on one surface while the opposite side is undecorated. The shell has two small perforations along one side where a cord would have been strung so as to allow the gorget to be worn around the neck. The depiction of the mammoth is oriented horizontally, along the shell, rather than vertically as is most common. This means that when worn, the mammoth is depicted with the head facing down. It now bears some damage where the object was crushed by a microscope while undergoing tests at the Smithsonian Institution in the late 20th century.

== Criticism ==
=== Description of discovery ===
In his original report, Cresson states that the pendant was discovered in a hole being dug in the peat along the Delaware River and across from the Holly Oak station of the railroad, from which the site gets its name. In another account, Cresson says that the shell was found amongst peat that was already spread across a farmers field, making it impossible to know which layer of the strata it came from, and thus determine its age.

In 1890, when the entire Holly Oak assemblage was presented to the Peabody Museum, it included 275 additional artifacts. This assemblage comprised stone tools, animal bones, wood that showed evidence of having been chopped by a stone axe, a mastodon tooth, archaic projectile points, and more objects that "make little sense archaeologically". Many of the materials appear to be from the Archaic Period; however, other materials, such as the bone implements and the gorget itself, suggest an older, possible Paleoindian origin.

Scientists also question the 25-year delay in bringing the find forward, for which Cresson did not have a convincing explanation. He claims that he did not understand the significance of the find at the time, although, he would undoubtedly have been aware of the artifact's significance due to the prominence of the La Madeleine carving discovered in France. Cresson also discusses a family dispute over the announcement of the discovery, as they were unwilling to risk a controversy such as had been seen with the faked mastodon pipes in the 1880s.

=== Shell ===
The shell that the gorget is made of is of a type mostly restricted to the Ohio Valley in the late Prehistoric period. This style of gorget is referred to as Fort Ancient, and is not common near Delaware. Here, Cresson's reputation does not lend him any aid. "The obvious inference to be drawn from this — that the shell for the engraving had been procured from an archaeological site or collection — was fortified by the discovery that Cresson had a record of theft from archaeological sites". Cresson was fired from the World's Columbian Exposition Survey in December 1891 for stealing some of the specimens from the Hopewell Site.

In 1986, a 0.3 gram shell sample was submitted for radiocarbon dating. The tests gave an age of 1530 ± 110 B.P. which, in calibrated years, dates the pendant to A.D. 885. This date is well after the time when mammoths had become extinct in North America. The gorget was also claimed to have been found in a peat bog; taking into account the shell's basic pH, there is very little chance that the shell could have survived for 10,000 years or more in said environment.

=== Style ===
In 1892, D.G. Brinton expressed the need to be suspicious of objects purported to have been made by aboriginal artists, listing the gorget and Lenape Stone as examples of such, citing the constant recurrence of frauds, and in 1893, after having examined the gorget and Lenape Stone, deemed both to have been recently made.

Several people who have viewed the Holly Oak gorget have commented on how similar the drawing is to the La Madeleine tusk. Frederick Ward Putnam of the Peabody Museum, Thomas Wilson of the United States National Museum, Daniel Brinton of the University of Pennsylvania, and even Cresson himself, have all discussed the similarities present between the two objects. At the time the shell became public, there were less than a half-dozen depictions of a mammoth available, and of those the La Madeleine drawing is by far the clearest depiction. At the time of the Holly Oak pendant, as there were so few ways known of drawing a mammoth, the marked similarities between the two were not thought of as being unduly suspicious.

David Meltzer lists several parallels between the two. They both have the same orientation and posture, and while most mammoths are shown with bulbous feet, the feet of both the Holly Oak and La Madeleine mammoths end abruptly; in La Madeleine's case, this was because part of the carving is missing, but there is room on the Holly Oak gorget where the ends of the feet could have been drawn. Furthermore, the contour of the back of the animal was drawn several times on the La Madeleine tusk, but only once on the Holly Oak gorget - the latter resembles more a modern elephant than a mammoth, which is consistent only with Charles Rau's drawing of the La Madeleine tusk, which was one of the few drawings available to the public. The trunk and tusks also more resemble those of a modern elephant than those of a mammoth, as if the artist misinterpreted the drawing.

Kraft and Thomas, who believe that it is possible that the gorget may be authentic, do list this explanation among the possible theories for the artifact's existence. There is, in general, a consensus that the gorget was faked using the drawing by Rau as being the most logical explanation for the manufacture of the object.

== See also ==
- Archaeological forgery
- Calaveras Skull
- Lenape Stone
- Shell gorget
