= Moravian Pottery and Tile Works =

- U.S. National Register of Historic Places
- U.S. National Historic Landmark District – Contributing property
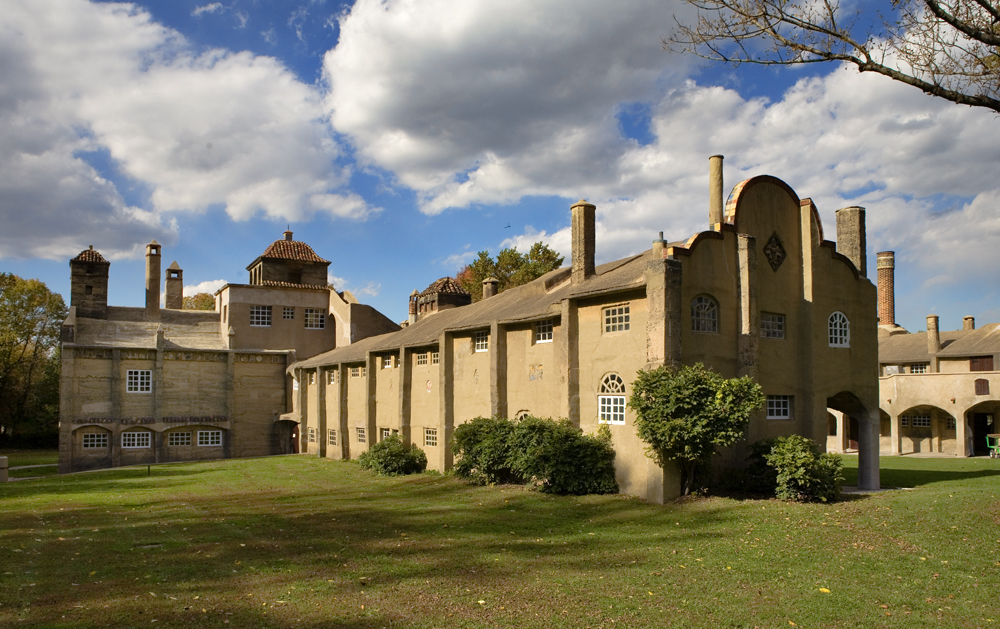
- Moravian Pottery and Tile Works

- Location within Pennsylvania Location within the United States
- Location: Doylestown Township, Pennsylvania
- Coordinates: 40°19′23″N 75°7′25″W
- Built: 1912
- Architect: Dr. Henry Chapman Mercer
- Architectural style: Mission/Spanish Revival
- Part of: Fonthill, Mercer Museum, and Moravian Pottery and Tile Works (ID85002366)
- NRHP reference No.: 72001098

Significant dates
- Added to NRHP: June 1, 1972
- Designated NHLDCP: February 4, 1985

The Moravian Pottery & Tile Works (MPTW) is a history museum which is located in Doylestown Township, Pennsylvania. It is owned by the County of Bucks, and operated by TileWorks of Bucks County, a 501c3 non-profit organization.

The museum was individually listed on the National Register of Historic Places in 1972, and was later included in a National Historic Landmark District along with the Mercer Museum and Fonthill. These three structures are the only cast-in-place concrete structures built by Mercer.

== History and museum features ==
Sample work from the tile plant established by Henry Chapman Mercer, now the Mercer Museum

After Mercer's death in 1930, the Tile Works continued under various leadership but faced challenges, including the Great Depression and World War II. Production diminished, and by the 1960s, the facility was underutilized.

In 1968, Bucks County purchased the property, and in 1974, tile production resumed as part of a working history museum.

The museum was individually listed on the National Register of Historic Places in 1972, and was later included in a National Historic Landmark District along with the Mercer Museum and Fonthill.

On April 7, 2021, the non-profit organization TileWorks of Bucks County, founded by former pottery manager, Katia McGuirk, assumed operations under an operating agreement with the County of Bucks, revitalizing the site specifically for the purpose of continuing and advancing the mission of the Moravian Pottery & Tile Works as a working history museum, with a focus on education, community engagement, and sustainable practices. Under the leadership of McGuirk, the Tile Works has expanded its offerings to include interactive tours, classes, workshops, creative collaborations, summer Bluegrass concerts outside, winter Night of Song concerts inside, and other cultural events. The facility now operates as both a museum and an active tile production studio, preserving Mercer's legacy while adapting to contemporary tastes.

Handmade tiles are still produced in a manner similar to that developed by the pottery's founder and builder, Henry Chapman Mercer. Tile designs are reissues of original designs. Mercer was a major proponent of the Arts and Crafts movement in America. He directed the work at the pottery from 1898 until his death in 1930.

Mercer generally did not affix a potter's mark to tiles made while he directed the work at MPTW. Following his death, there were several marks used to indicate that a tile had originated at MPTW.

Founded in 1898, the Moravian Pottery and Tile Works (MPTW) was Mercer's response to the dehumanizing effects of industrialization. Influenced by the Arts and Crafts ideals of William Morris and John Ruskin, Mercer sought to preserve traditional craftsmanship by reviving medieval methodologies. Mercer became the leading Tile Maker in the American Arts & Crafts movement.

The Tile Works specializes in handmade ceramic tiles incorporating medieval, Renaissance, and Pennsylvania German designs, as well as natural themes like animals and plants, and literary sources. The tiles tell stories from cultural touchstones Mercer encountered during his personal travels around the world. Each tile is made using Mercer's own designs, molds, and local clay. The Tile Works still holds 6,000 of Mercer’s original design molds in its museum collections, many of which are still in use in tile production today.

The Tile Works is one of three cast-in-place concrete structures built by Mercer. The others include Fonthill, which is located on the same property and served as his home; and the Mercer Museum, located approximately one mile away.

The Moravian Pottery and Tile Works offers workshops and an apprenticeship program to teach the art of handcrafting ceramic tiles and mosaics.
