= Lenape Stone =

Slate found in Pennsylvania in 1872

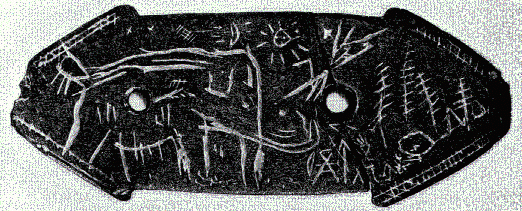
The two halves of the Lenape Stone – the fracture line can be seen running diagonally through the rightmost hole.

The Lenape Stone is a slate found in two pieces in Bucks County, Pennsylvania in 1872, which appears to depict Native Americans hunting a woolly mammoth. The image seems to have been carved some time after the stone was broken into two; for this and other reasons, it is generally considered an archaeological forgery.

== History ==
The first portion of the stone is reported to have been found in Mechanicsville, Bucks County by Bernard Hansell, a farmer, in the spring of 1872. In 1881, Hansell sold the fragment to Henry Paxson, a young man with an interest in Native American artifacts. A few months later, Hansell reported finding the second piece of the stone in the same field where he had unearthed the first.

Once the two pieces were joined, they were examined by members of the Bucks County Historical Society, including archaeologist and historian Henry Chapman Mercer. Despite evidence which cast doubt on the stone's origin, Mercer came to be an ardent proponent of its authenticity, an argument which he put forth in his 1885 book, The Lenape Stone, or the Indian and the Mammoth. However, even Mercer acknowledged that the stone's unique nature and a lack of physical evidence (such as soil samples) made scientific certainty impossible.

The Lenape Stone was acquired by the Mercer Museum in 1934 for $600. In 1967 the stone was stolen from the museum and was missing for two years. It was recovered in 1969 during an undercover investigation in Philadelphia.

The stone is still housed at the Mercer Museum in Doylestown, Pennsylvania.

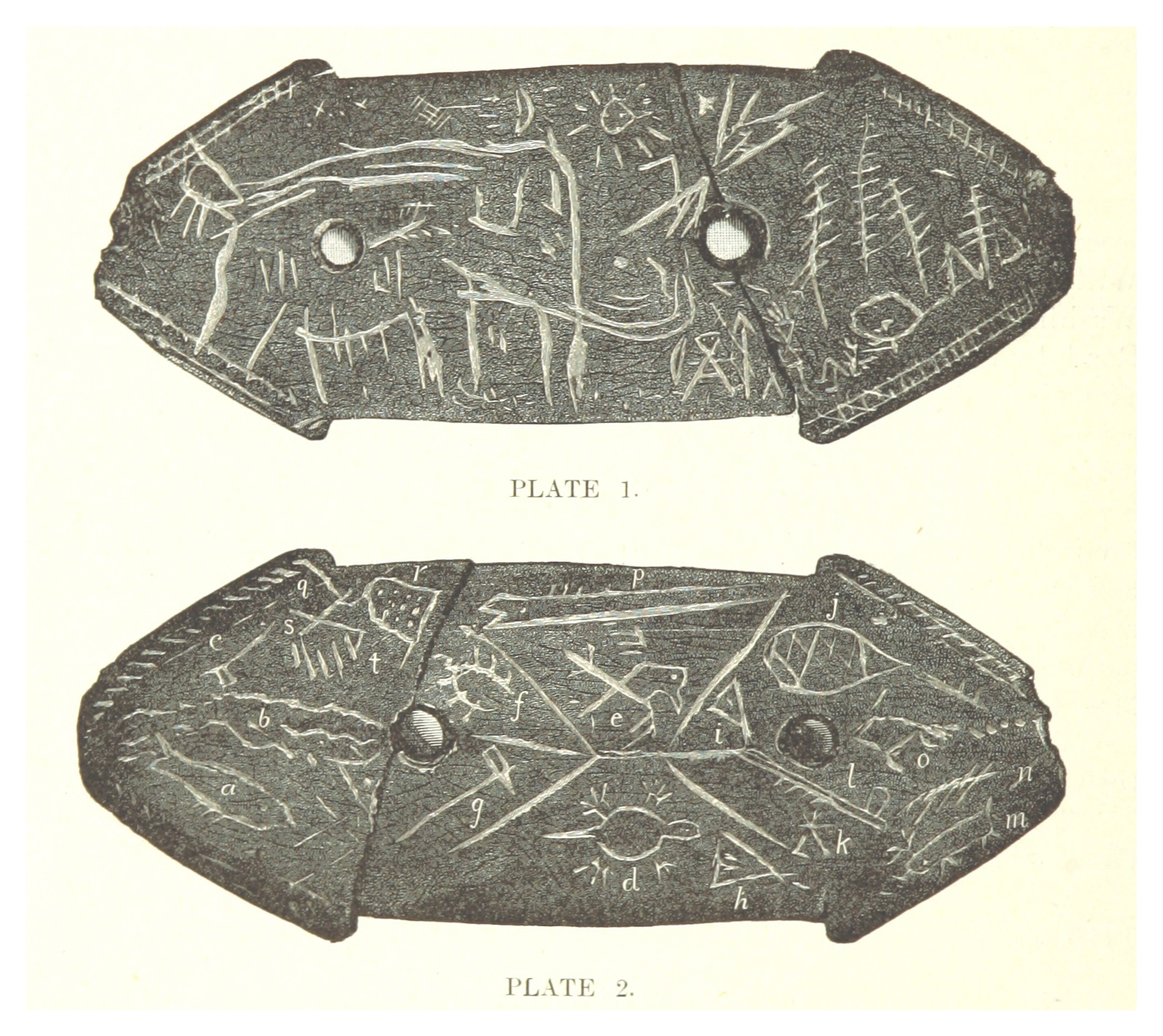
The Lenape Stone - both sides

== Physical description ==
The Lenape Stone is a small piece of slate, 4 3/8 in × 1 3/4 in × 1/2 in (111 mm × 44 mm × 13 mm). It is hypothesised to have been a gorget, a type of ornamental necklace. Supporting this theory are the two holes drilled into the stone which would have enabled it to be worn about the neck. The stone comprises two fragments, each of which is decorated with clear engravings on both sides; they form a complete picture when the two halves are joined. On one side there are numerous depictions of turtles, fish, birds, and snakes. The reverse side shows an elephant-like creature, apparently a mammoth, along with humanoid figures, a forest, some teepees, and other markings. The humanoid figures are engaged in battle with the mammoth, and one even appears to have been trampled by it.

== Authenticity ==
Henry Mercer purported the Lenape Stone was authentic. The stone was a significant find at the time, being supposedly the first ancient illustration of a mammoth in America. Mercer went to great lengths detailing his analysis in his 1885 book, The Lenape Stone, or the Indian and the Mammoth, which he personally paid to have published. He conducted an archaeological dig on the Hansell Farm, collected testimony, documented contemporary expert opinions (including contemporary Indians and scholars who disagreed with his own conclusion), and researched related findings and Native American mythology. Mercer theorized that the back side of the stone, with the various animal depictions, could have been a pictographic or mnemonic device depicting an oral history or "song-chronicle" of Indian history. He compared the pictographs with that of the Walam Olum, a purported Lenape origin story which was similarly identified as a hoax by later scholars.

Kenneth Feder notes that mammoths became extinct in North America around 10,000 years ago, while most gorgets uncovered in archaeological digs are less than 2,000 years old. In addition, other artifacts found in the same farm as the Lenape Stone bore stylistically similar carvings, and these were all dated to around 2,000 years ago. After the slate was found it was cleaned multiple times, destroying evidence of erosion or wear. The carvings on each half of the stone appear not to match up perfectly, which may indicate that they were made after the stone was broken. Feder concluded that the stone "was obviously a fake" and was possibly created by whoever made it in order to sell it.

Herbert C. Kraft, an archaeologist and leading scholar on Lenape History from the 1960s to the 1990s, concluded the Lenape Stone is a fake. While gorget stones were used from 1000 BC to 1000 AD, few are incised with figures. The bow and arrow shown on the stone was not in use by Paleo-Indian mastodon or mammoth hunters. Teepees, as depicted on the stone, were not known to be used by Native Americans in the East.

== Copycat stones ==
Bernard Hansell, the alleged finder of the Lenape Stone, claimed to have discovered three more similar stones in 1885, while Mercer was writing his book. Mercer documented these finds in his book and believed this bolstered the authenticity of the Lenape Stone, while others believe these were more of Hansell's frauds.

The Hammond Tablet, also known as the Hammond Stone or Taunton Stone, bears a strikingly similar resemblance to the Lenape Stone. It was a gorget stone found in 1917 near Taunton, Massachusetts about five miles upstream from Dighton Rock, known for its mysterious petroglyphs. Frank C. Hammond, a local railroad engineer and artifact collector, uncovered the stone while he was plowing on his farm. The stone was made of dark slate like the Lenape Stone, although it was bigger at 12 in × 6 in × 1/2 in (305 mm × 152 mm × 13 mm). It was in the shape of an animal pelt and each side depicted scenes very similar to the Lenape Stone. It had four holes while the Lenape Stone only has two.

The whereabouts of the Hammond Tablet are unknown, but pictures and tracings of the stone made by Professor Edmund Burke Delabarre are stored at the Peabody Museum of Archaeology and Ethnology at Harvard University. An article in the Boston Post from 1921 chronicled multiple experts who had varying theories, ranging from the stone being authentic to a fraud perpetrated by Mormons. In the 1920s, Professor Delabarre and C. C. Willoughby, Director of the Peabody Museum at Harvard, both argued the Hammond Tablet was most likely a deliberate fake. Willoughby theorizes both stones were possibly made by the same person or at the same time. However, one must note that the Hammond Tablet was found 50 years after the Lenape Stone and they were found over 250 miles (400 km) apart. In the 1990s, Lenape historian Herbert C. Kraft argued the Hammond Tablet was "plagiarized from the equally fake Lenape Stone." In 2001 he wrote the Hammond Tablet was most likely copied from Mercer's illustrations of the Lenape Stone.

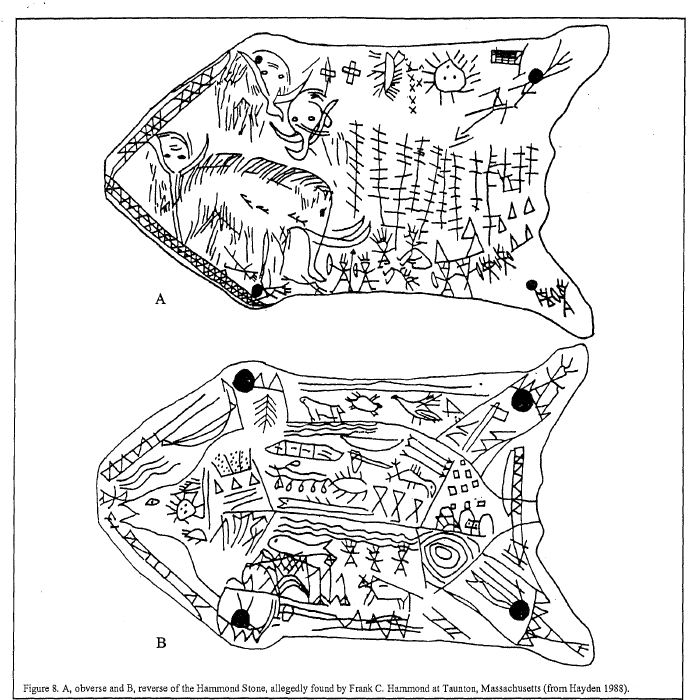
More Detailed Hammond Tablet Sketch

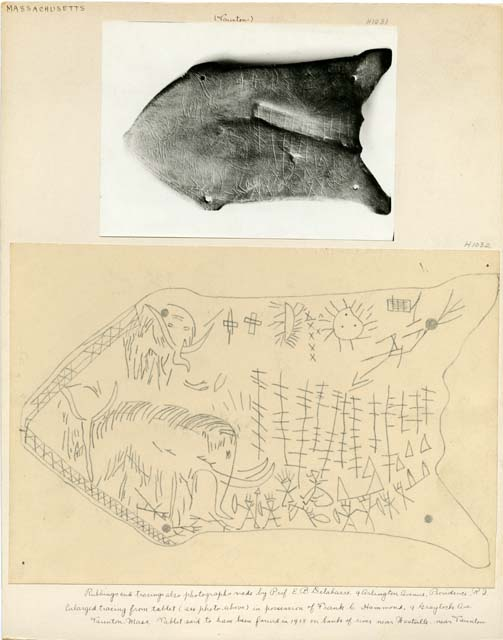
Front of Hammond Tablet

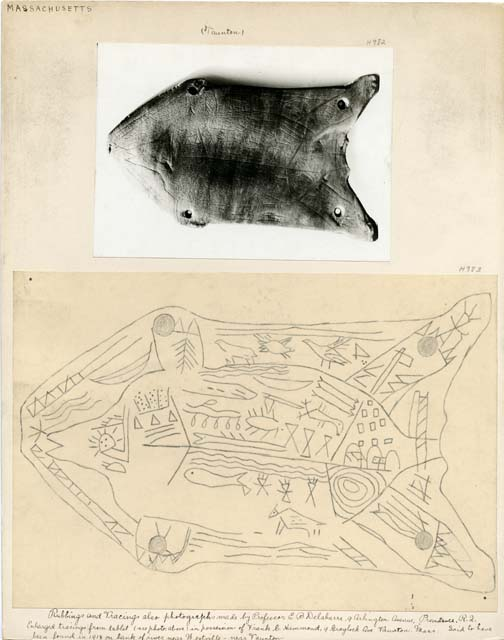
Back of Hammond Tablet

== See also ==
- Holly Oak gorget – another forged artifact bearing a carving of a mammoth
