= Fonthill (house) =

Historic house in Pennsylvania, United States

- Fonthill Castle
- U.S. National Register of Historic Places
- U.S. National Historic Landmark District – Contributing property
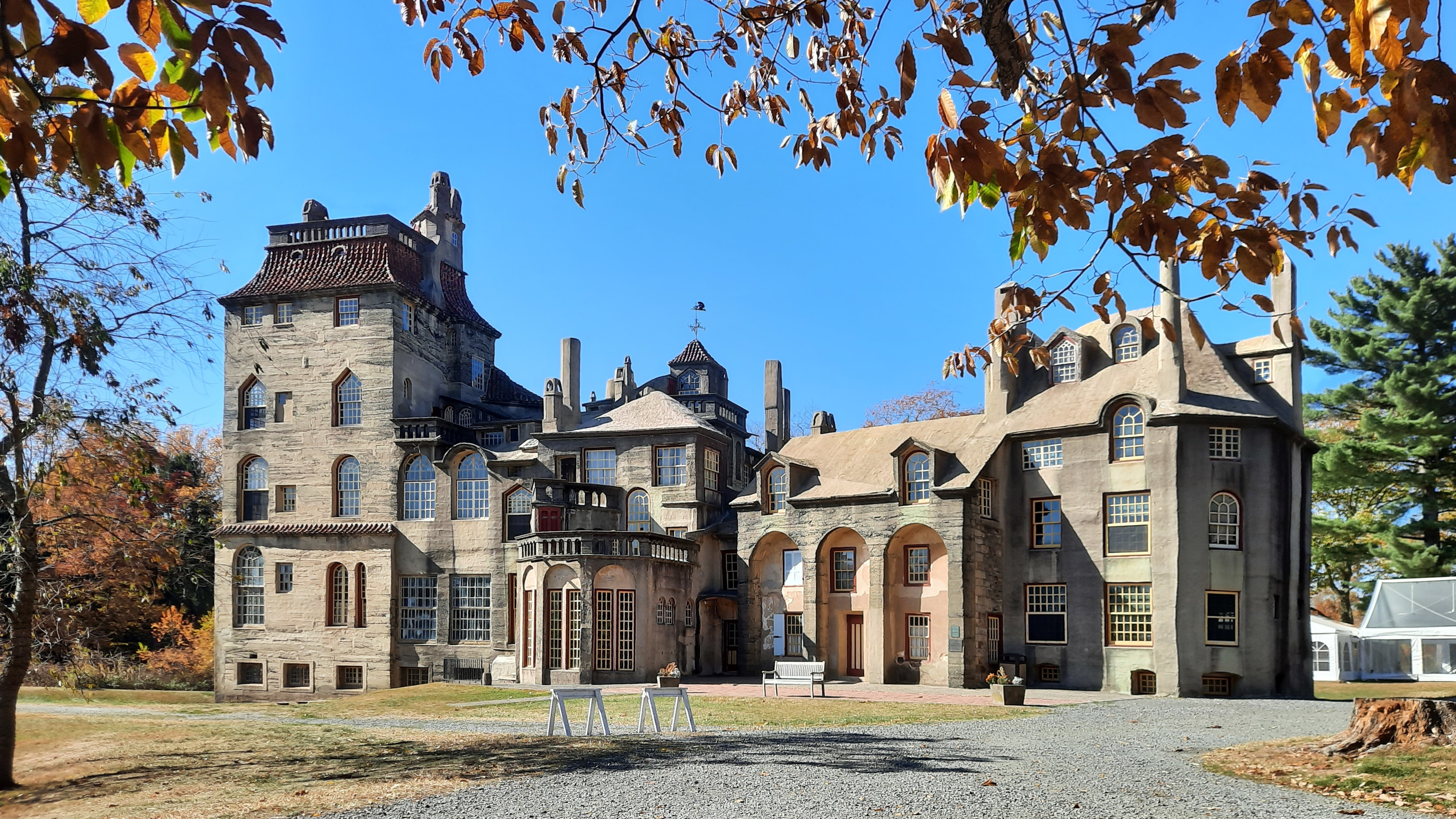
- The castle in 2024

- Location within Pennsylvania Location within the United States
- Location: Doylestown Township, Pennsylvania
- Coordinates: 40.321158°N 75.122902°W
- Built: 1908
- Architect: Dr. Henry C. Mercer
- Architectural style: Mixed (more than two styles from different periods)
- Part of: Fonthill Castle, Mercer Museum, and Moravian Pottery and Tile Works (ID85002366)
- NRHP reference No.: 72001094

Significant dates
- Added to NRHP: June 1, 1972
- Designated NHLDCP: February 4, 1985

Fonthill, also known as Fonthill Castle, was the home of the American archaeologist and tile maker Henry Chapman Mercer, in Doylestown Township, Pennsylvania.

== History ==
Built between 1908 and 1912, Fonthill Castle is an early example of poured-in-place concrete and features 44 rooms, over 200 windows, 18 fireplaces, 10 bathrooms and one powder room. The interior was originally painted in pastel colors, but age and sunlight have all but eradicated any hint of the former hues. One room in the Terrace Pavilion (built on the site of the former home's barn), has a restored paint job so visitors can view the home's former glory. The castle contains built-in furniture and is embellished with decorative tiles, made by Mercer at the height of the Arts and Crafts movement. The castle is filled with an extensive collection of ceramics embedded in the concrete of the house, as well as other artifacts from Mercer's world travels, including cuneiform tablets discovered in Mesopotamia dating back to over 2300 BCE. The home also contains around 1,000 prints from Mercer's extensive collection, as well as over six thousand books, almost all of which were annotated by Mercer himself.

The Castle was listed on the National Register of Historic Places in 1972, and was later included in a National Historic Landmark District along with the Moravian Pottery and Tile Works and the Mercer Museum. These three structures are the only poured-in-place concrete structures built by Mercer. The Moravian Pottery and Tile Works is located on the same property as Fonthill Castle, and the Mercer Museum is located about a mile away.

Fonthill Castle and the Mercer Museum are operated by the Bucks County Historical Society, whereas the Moravian Pottery and Tile Works is operated by the County of Bucks.

== Visiting ==
Fonthill Castle is open Tuesday through Sunday for guided one-hour tours. Due to its historic nature, Fonthill Castle has limited accessibility with steep stairs and narrow, uneven passages throughout the site. Personal photography is permitted during tours; commercial, wedding, or event photography permits are available.

== Community programs ==
Throughout the year, community programs are held at Fonthill Castle as enrichment activities and/or fundraisers for the Bucks County Historical Society. These events have included Winter Wonderland Tours, Shakespeare in the Park, Candlelight Holiday Tours, Tower Tours for Families, Mercer's Night Tales, Behind the Scenes Tours, and Escape Rooms.

== See also ==
- Fonthill Abbey – a demolished house in England
