= Idlewild (Media, Pennsylvania) =

Historic house in Pennsylvania, United States

Coordinates: 39.9122°N 75.3889°W

- U.S. National Register of Historic Places
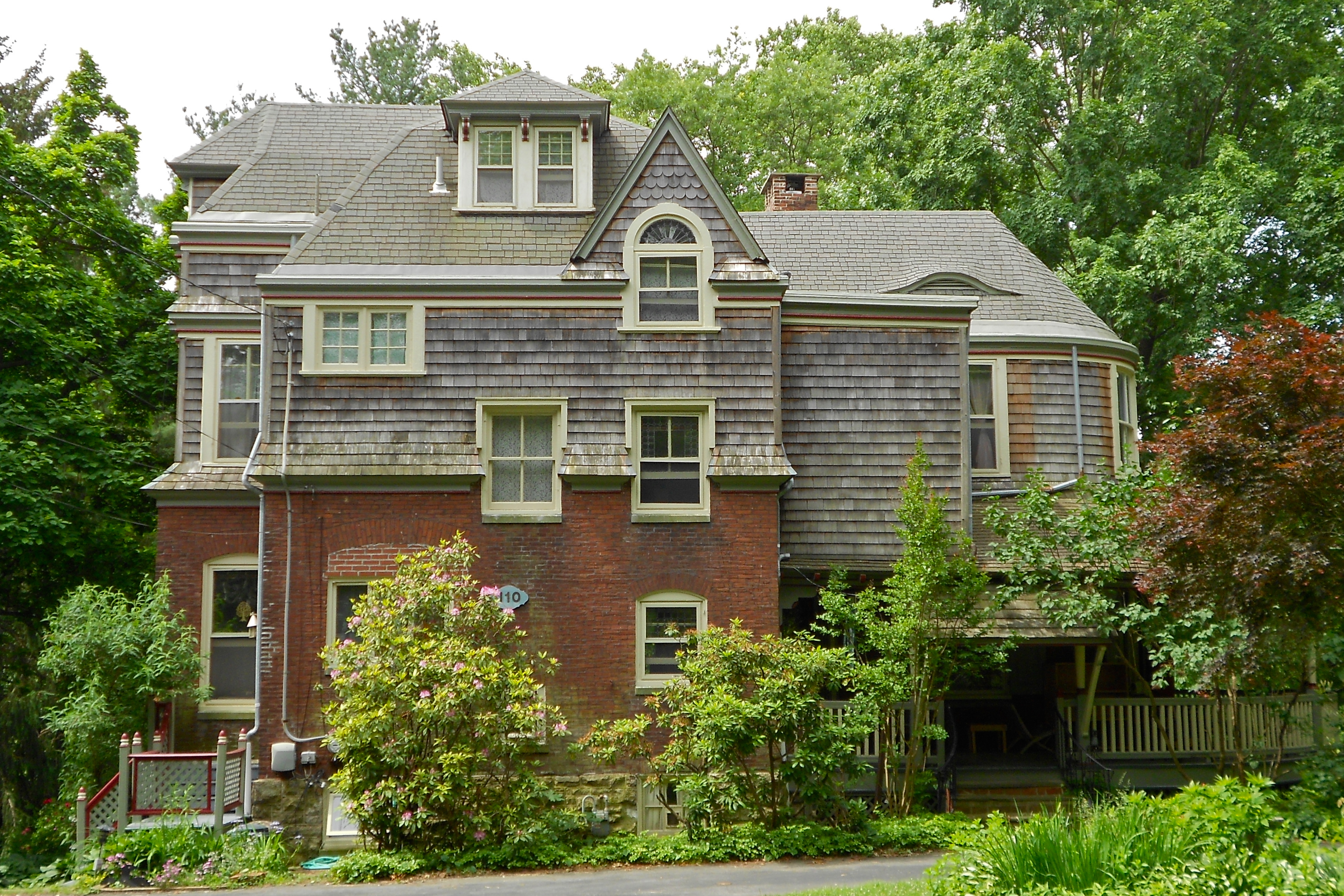
- Frank Furness's summer cottage from the front

- Location within Pennsylvania Location within the United States
- Location: 110 Idlewild Circle, Media, Pennsylvania
- Area: less than one acre
- Built: c. 1890
- Architectural style: Queen Anne, Shingle Style
- NRHP reference No.: 13000255
- Added to NRHP: May 8, 2013

Idlewild is a historic building near Media, Pennsylvania, designed by the Victorian-era Philadelphia architect Frank Furness as a summer cottage for his family. He spent summers there until his death in 1912.

== History ==
The house was built about 1890 on the grounds of the Idlewild Hotel, which Furness had designed in 1886. The home was Furness' payment for his design of the hotel. It was listed on the National Register of Historic Places in May 2013.

The Furnesses lived in Philadelphia during the winter, but summered in more informal cottages. Prior to 1892, they summered in Cape May, New Jersey, in a house he did not design. Furness died at "Idlewild" in 1912.

== Design and construction ==
"Idlewild" is constructed with a stone basement and brick first floor. The upper floors are framed in wood and clad with cedar shingles. It has a wrap-around covered porch, high-ceilinged rooms, and an irregular roofline with variously shaped windows and eyebrow dormers. Furness placed the service rooms and front and back stairs (with a shared landing, as at the Emlen Physick House) at the front. This increases the privacy of the rooms behind, and the visual interplay between the differing scales of the "service tower" and main house gives vibrancy to the façade. The "chronic eccentricity" of his ornament in other buildings is "rather restrained" here. But the complex façade both expresses function and presents the viewer with a puzzle to decipher.

"For his own house in Media, [Furness] shrank the plan of the contemporary University Library, and erected over it a stone, brick, and shingle house." — James F. O'Gorman.

The basic form of the house – a multi-storied, semicircular apse springing from an anchoring block, with the entrance at their juncture – is closely related to Furness's 1888 design for the University of Pennsylvania Library (now the Fisher Fine Arts Library). In the library, the architect placed the grand staircase in a tower at the front, separating circulation to the building's upper stories from the reading rooms behind. The library's two-story, ovoid-shaped Rotunda Reading Room is wrapped by an arcing cluster of one-story seminar rooms. "Idlewild'"s porch echoes this, wrapping around the house's ovoid parlor. Furness played with similar volumes in his design for the Bryn Mawr Hotel (1890-91). The library has been described as "a collision between a cathedral and a train station."

== Gallery ==
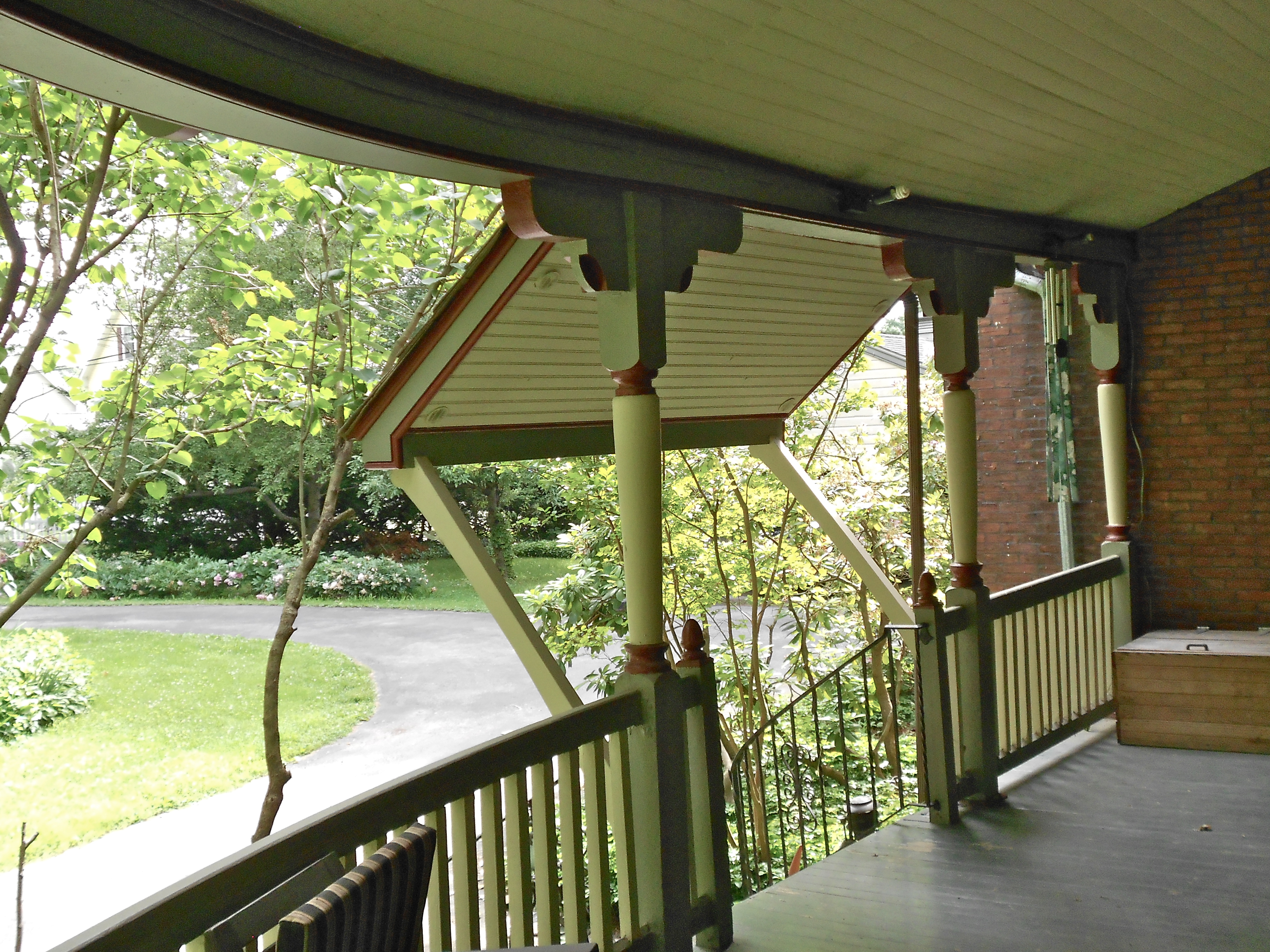
Front entrance and porch

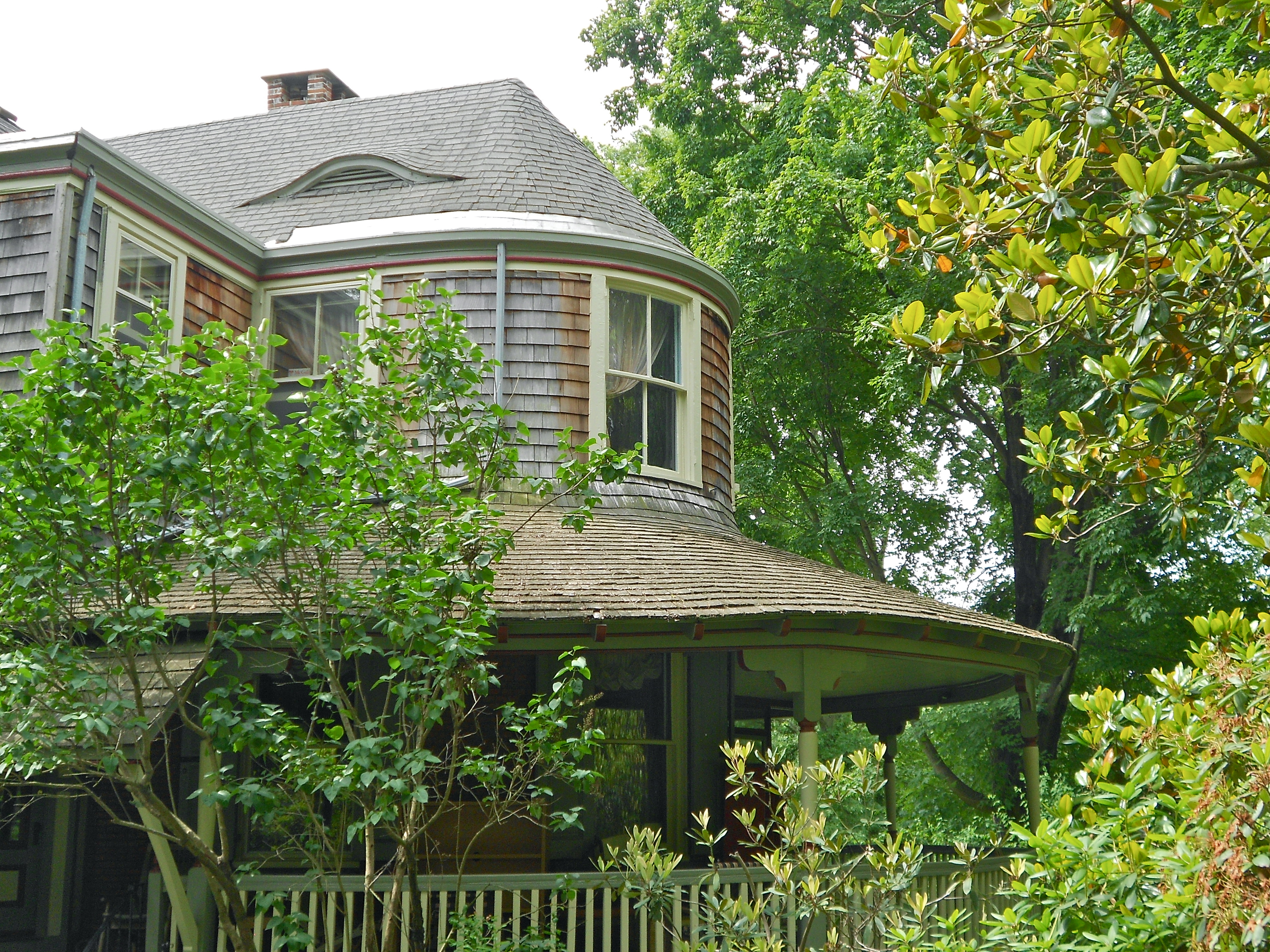
Apse-end w/ wrap-around porch

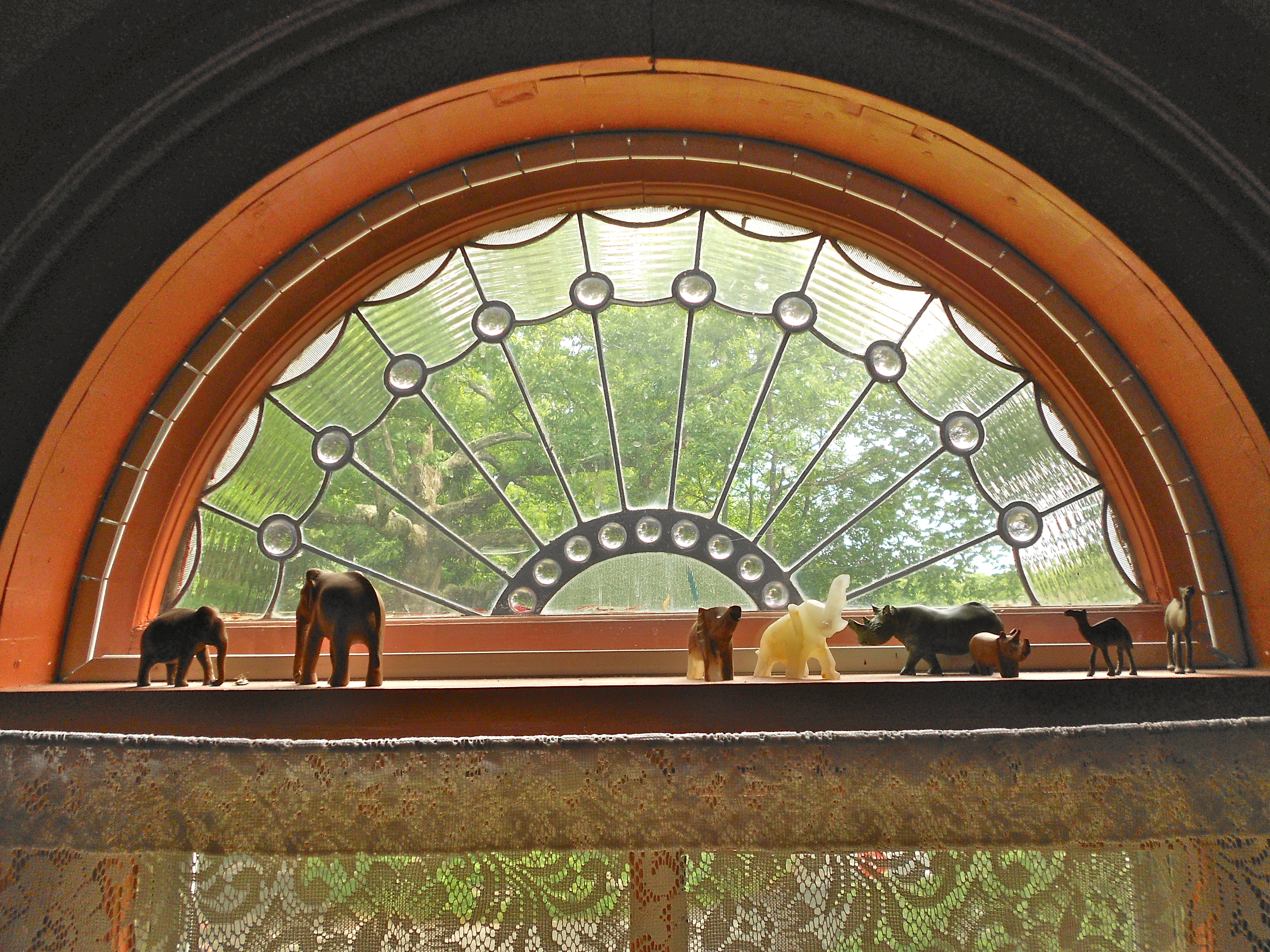
Idlewild window detail

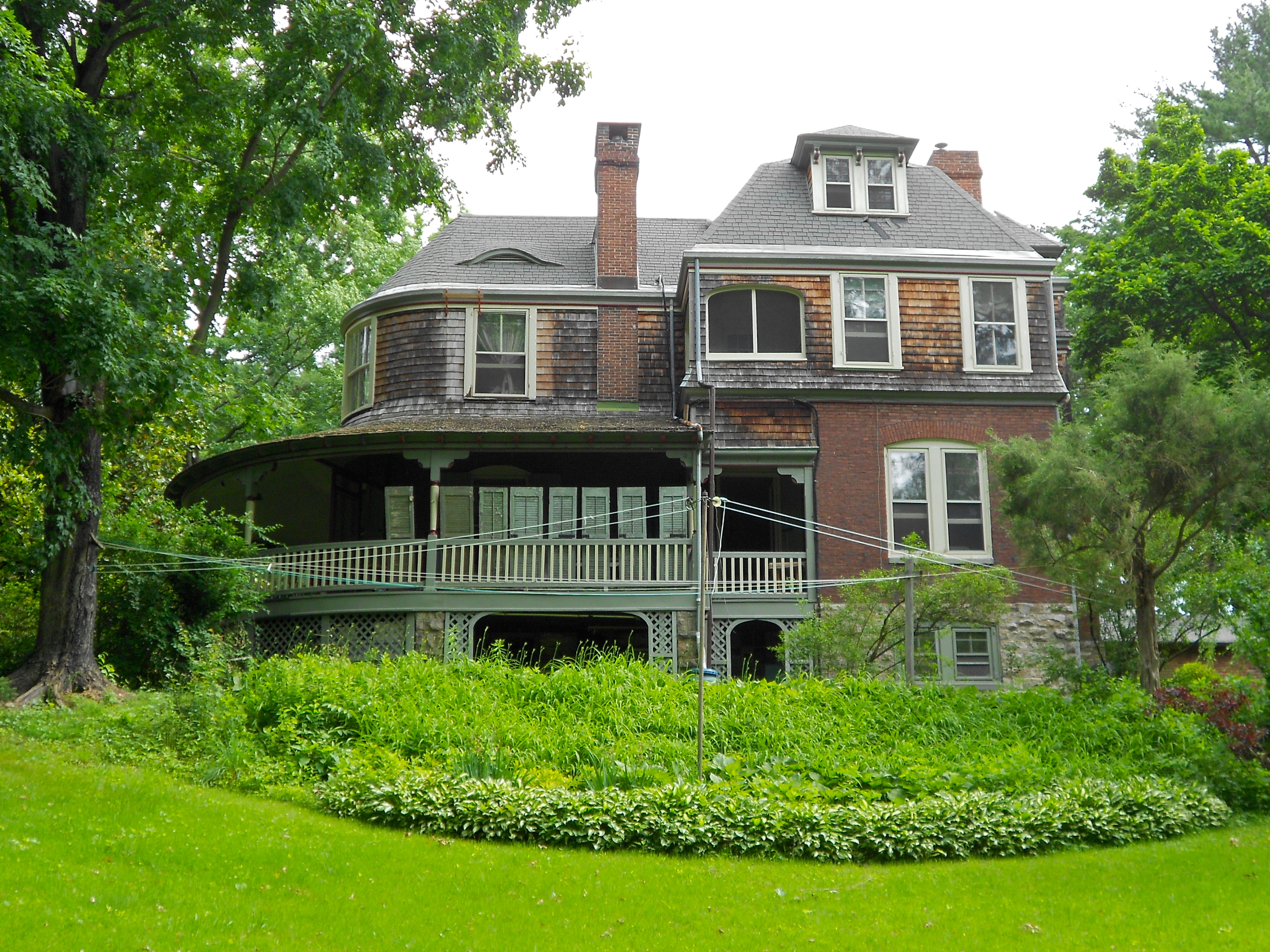
South (rear) facade

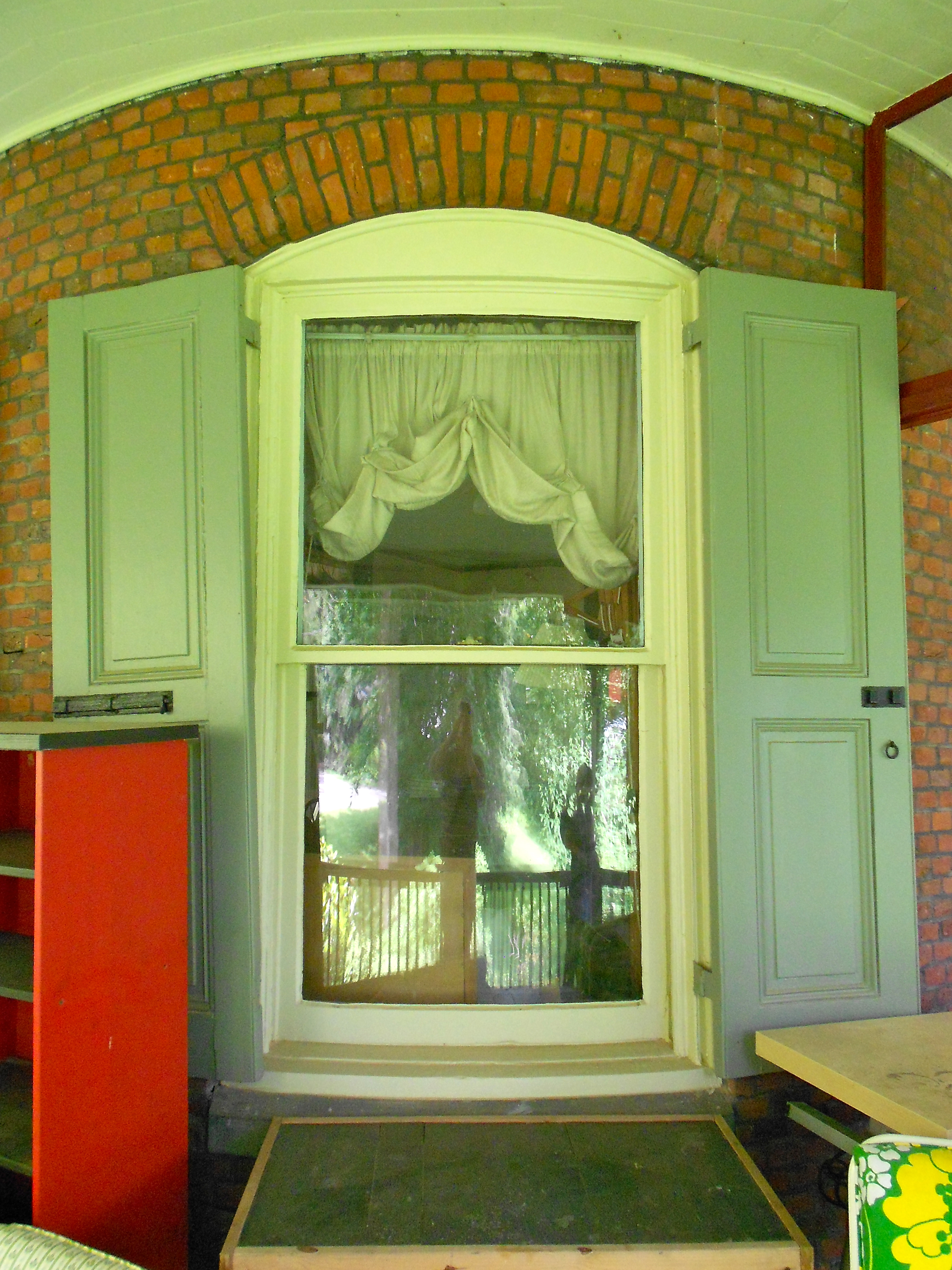
Window detail

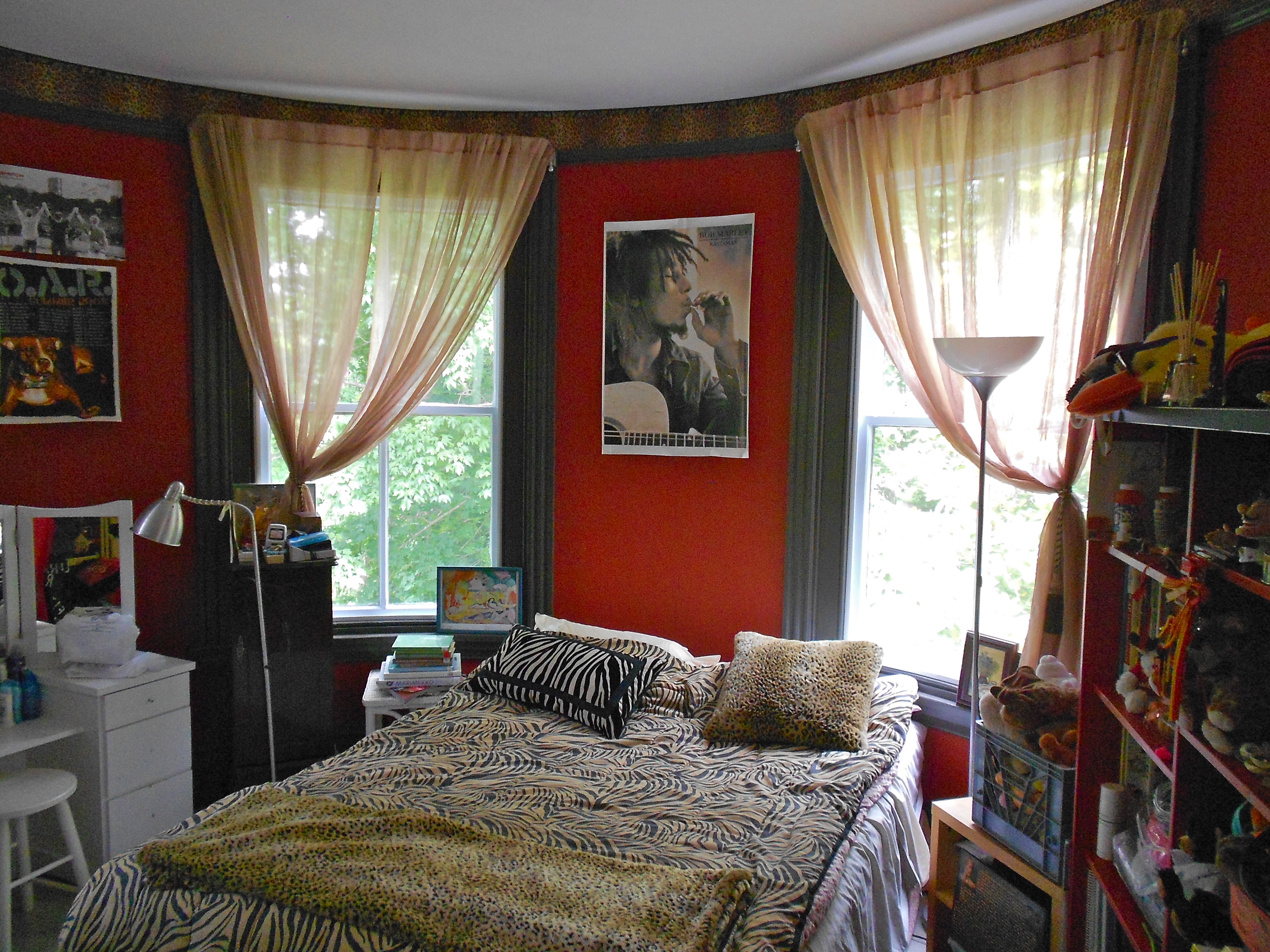
2nd floor bedroom

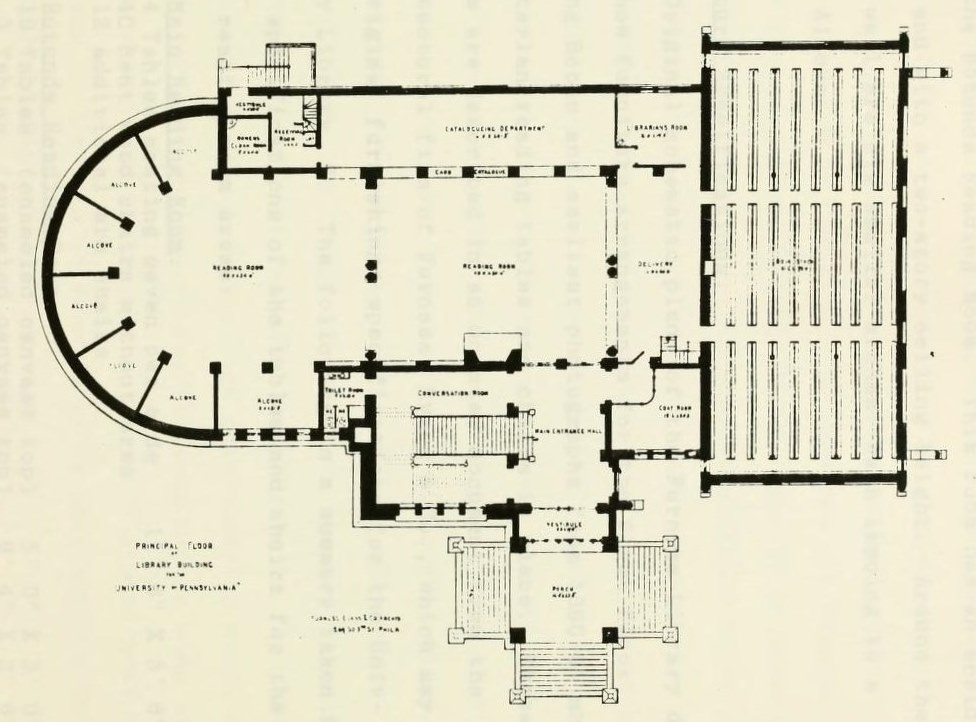
Furness' floor plan of the U.Penn library(1891), which he used for Idlewild's design.

== Other Furness works ==
See main article: Frank Furness

"Idlewild" is located at the top of Gayley Hill in Upper Providence Township just south of the borough of Media. This was a mile west of "Lindenshade," the Wallingford summer house of his brother, Shakespearean scholar Horace Howard Furness. It was also a short walk to the Moylan-Rose Valley train station, which enabled him to commute to his architectural office in Philadelphia.

Some projects completed by Furness in the area at the same time as Idelewild (1888–1891) include:

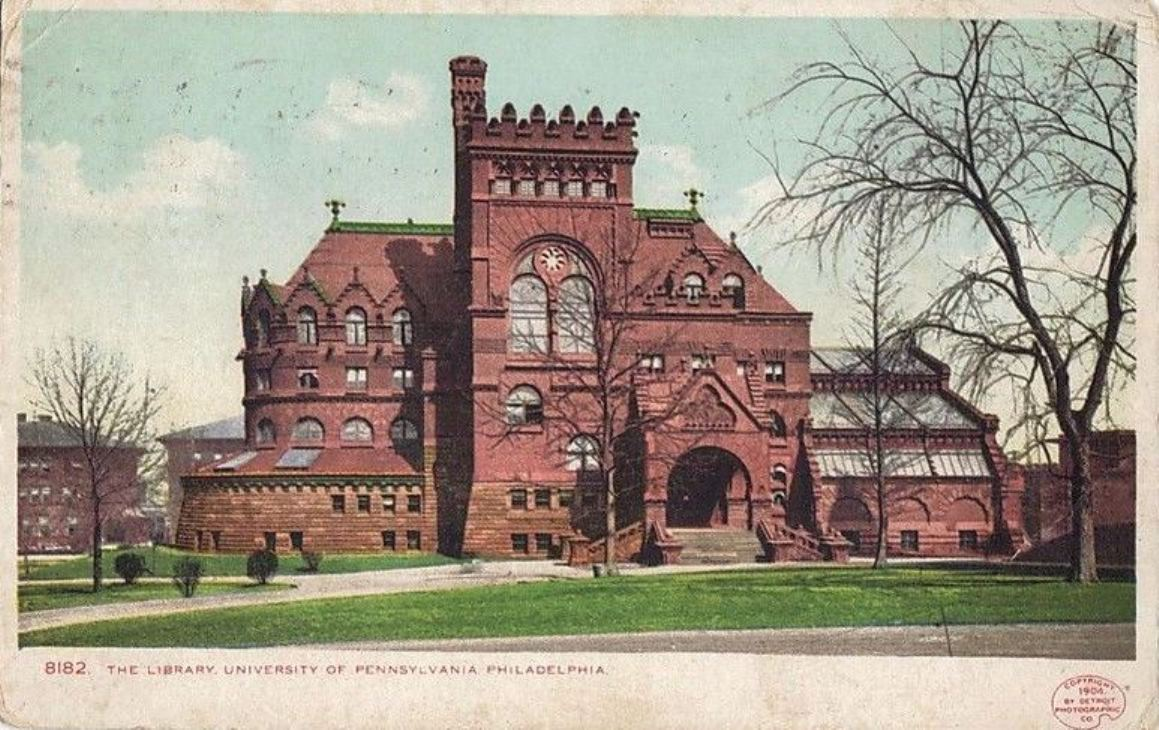
University of Pennsylvania Library (1888–91)

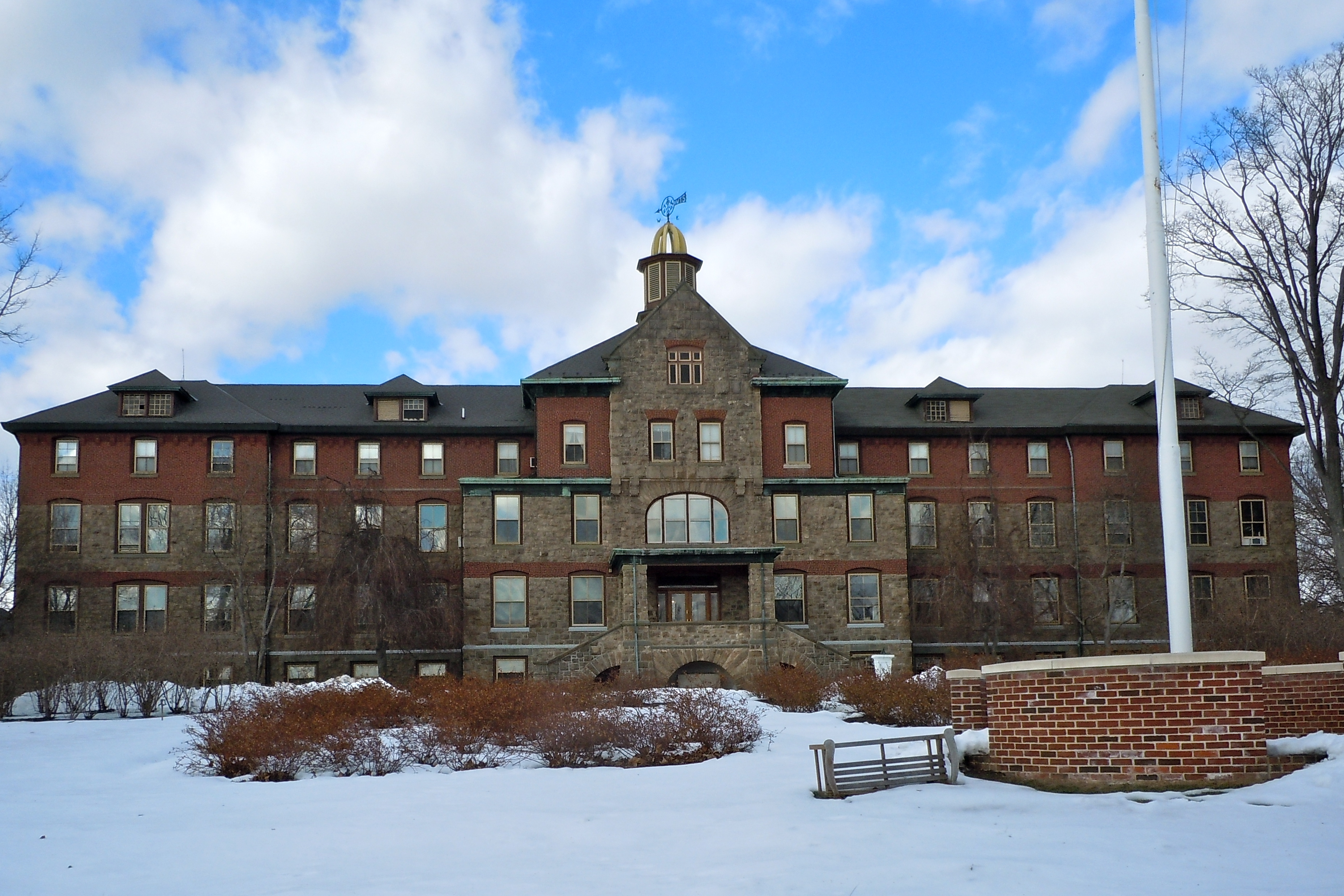
Rowan Hall at Williamson College of the Trades (1890), in nearby Middletown.

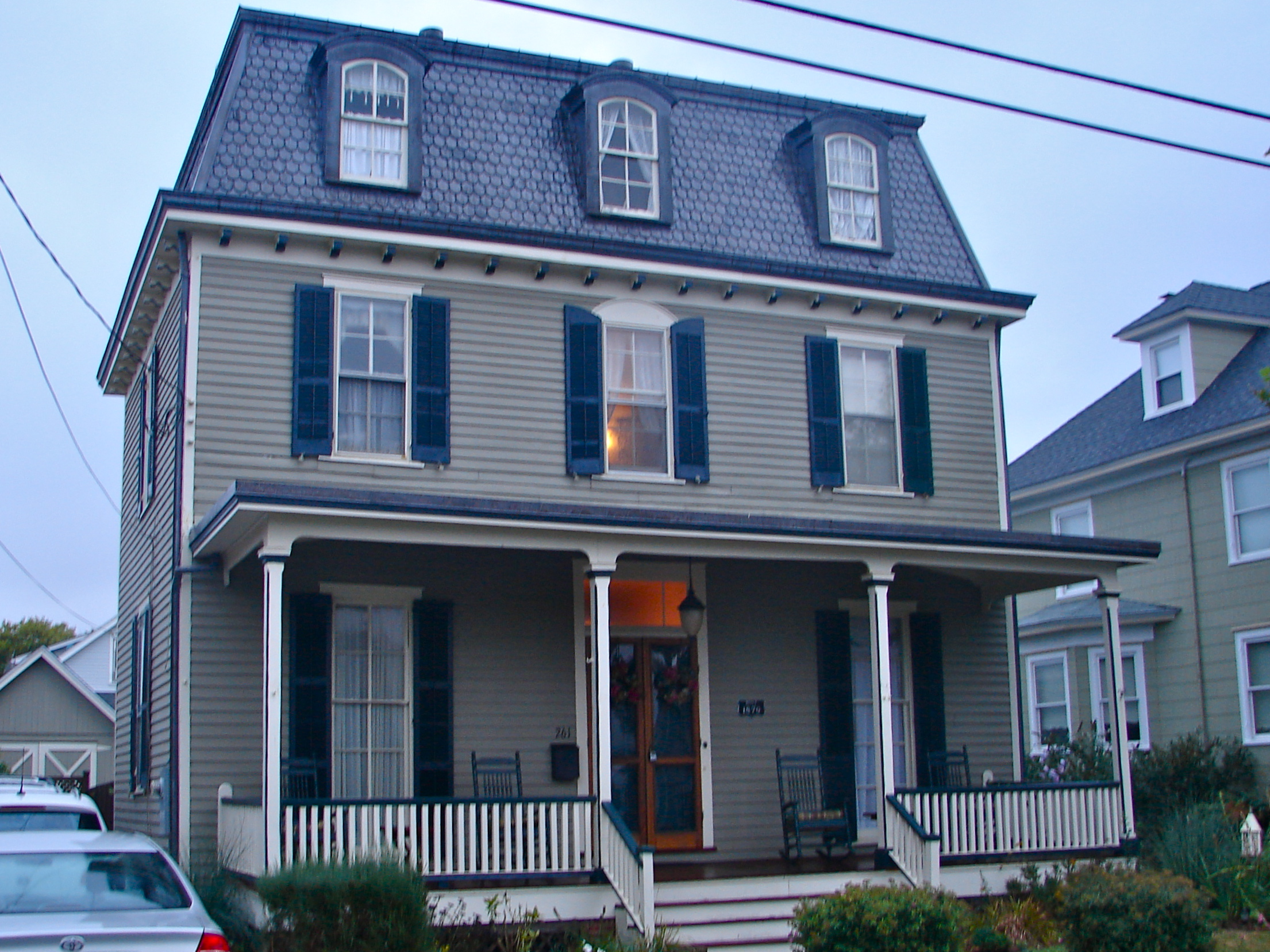
Furness summer cottage in Cape May, NJ

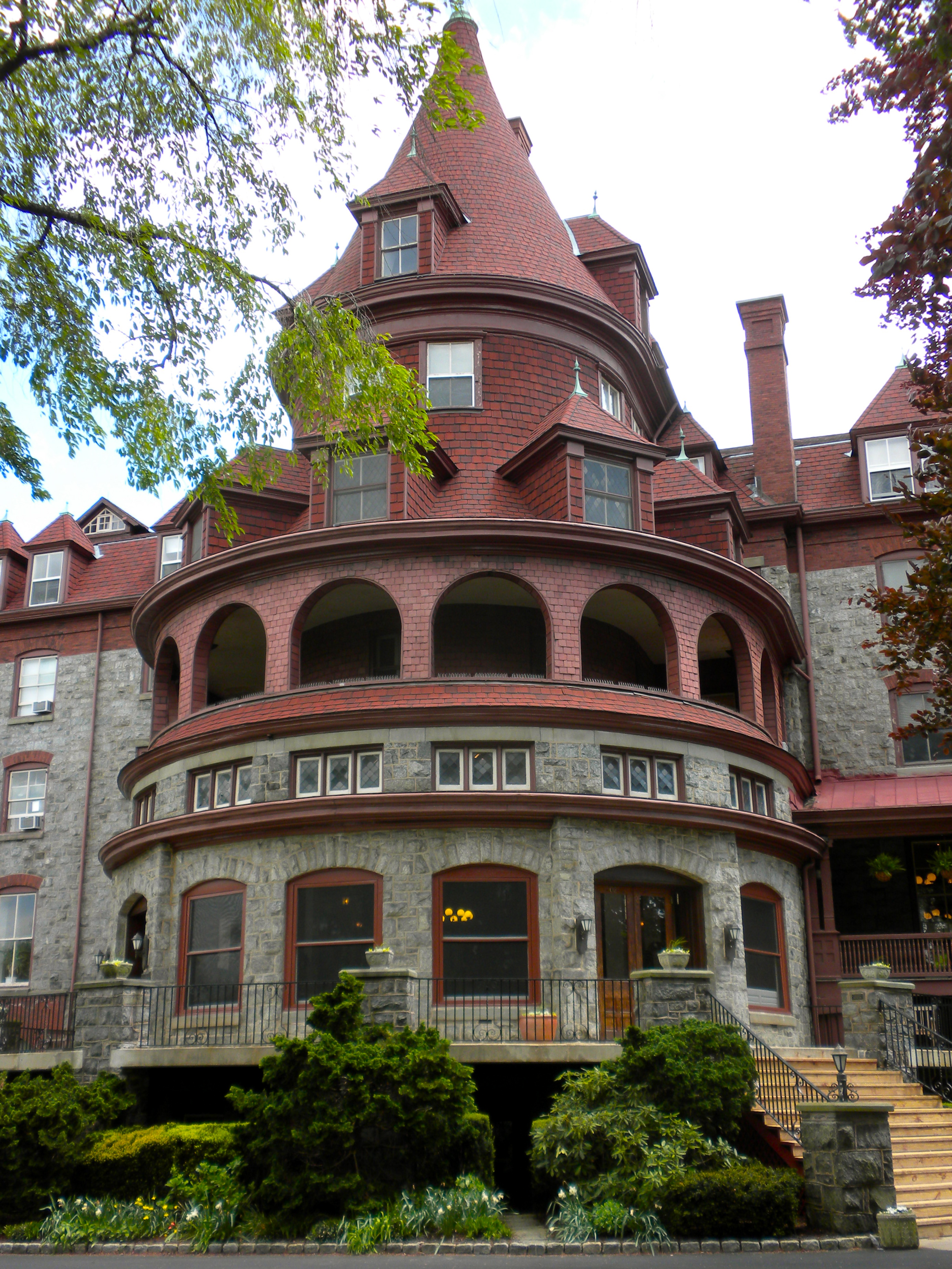
Bryn Mawr Hotel (1890–91) (now Baldwin School), Bryn Mawr, Pennsylvania.

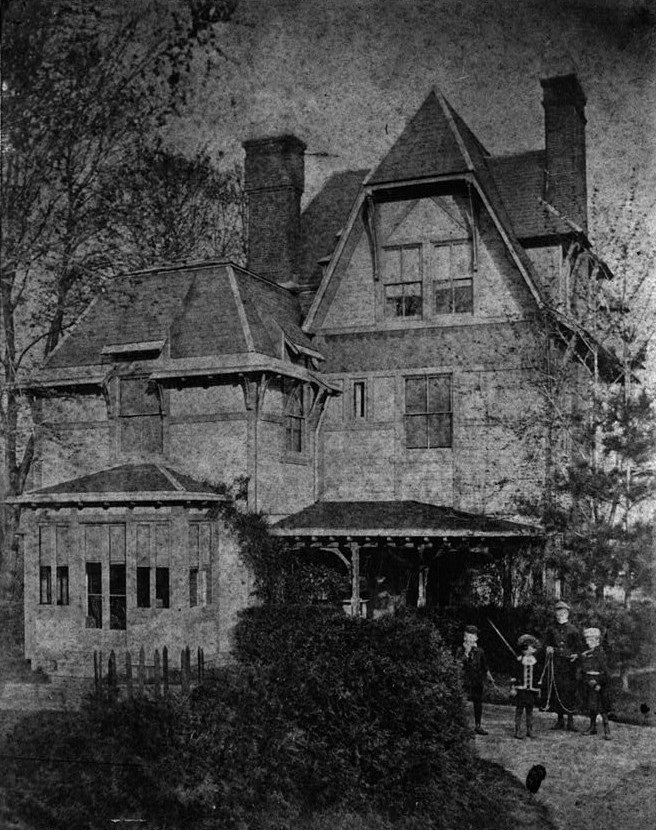
Lindenshade (1873), the Wallingford house of Franks's brother, Horace Howard Furness

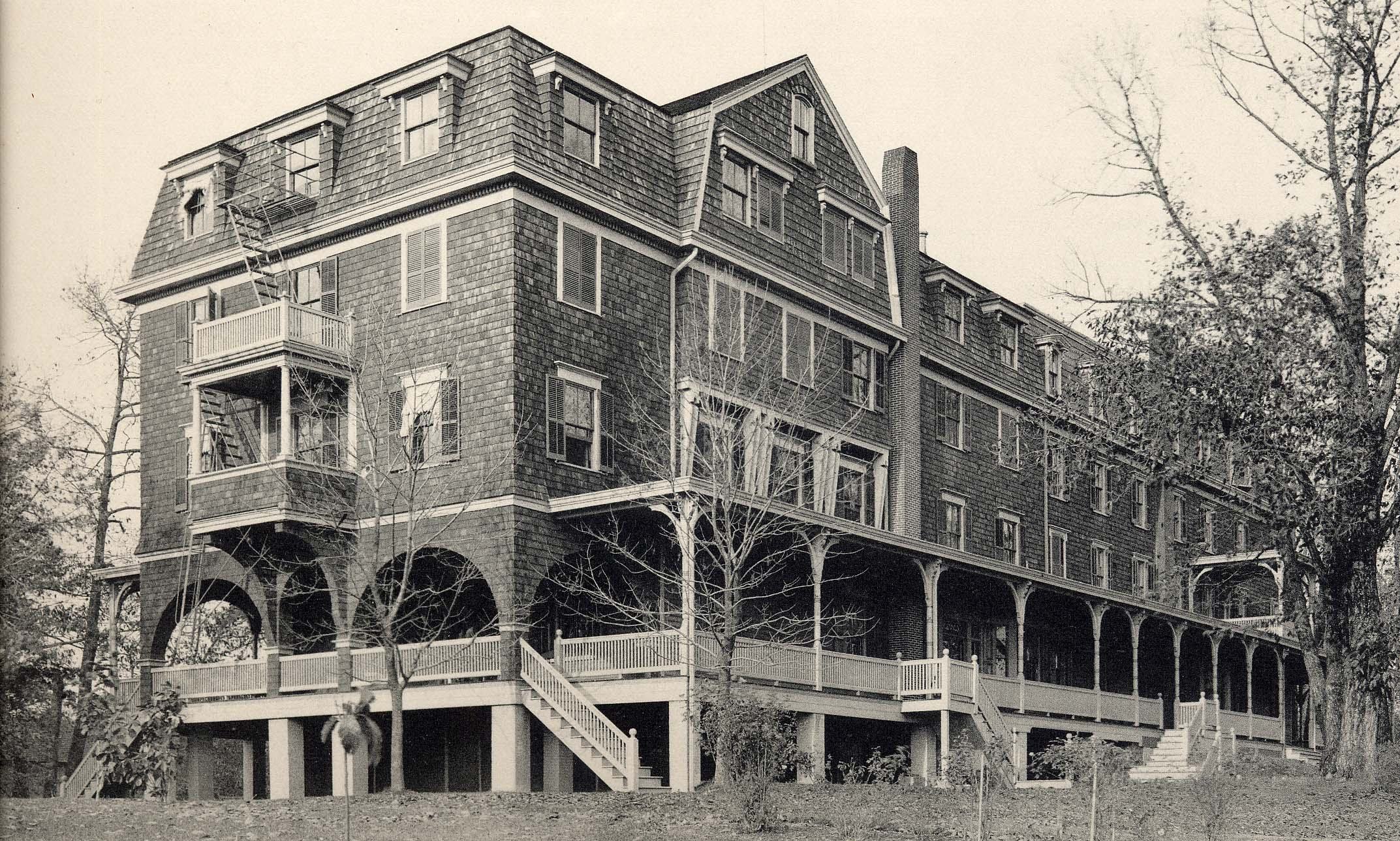
The Idlewild Hotel (c.1897), Media, PA

== Sources ==
- Lewis, Michael J., Frank Furness: Architecture and the Violent Mind. New York: W.W. Norton, 2001.
- Thomas, George E.; Jeffrey A. Cohen; Michael J. Lewis (1996). Frank Furness: The Complete Works (Second ed.). Princeton Architectural Press. p. 295. ISBN 9781568980942.
