= Perelman Center for Advanced Medicine =

- University of Pennsylvania Health System

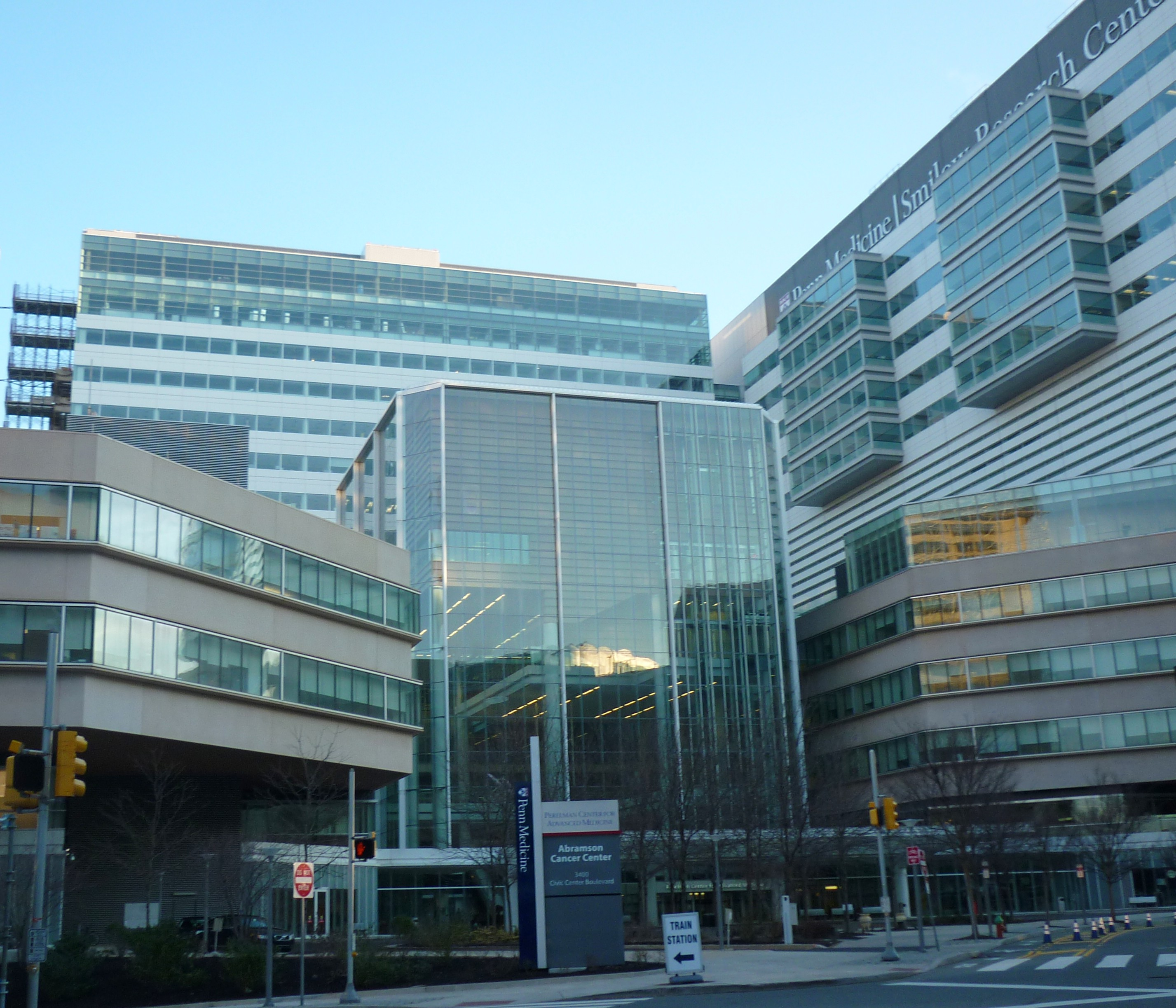

Geography
- Location: 3400 Civic Center Boulevard, Philadelphia, PA, United States
- Coordinates: 39.948197°N 75.193393°W

Organization
- Care system: Private
- Type: Specialist
- Affiliated university: Perelman School of Medicine
- Network: University of Pennsylvania Health System

Services
- Speciality: Oncology, cardiovascular

Helipads
- Helipad: Yes (at HUP)

History
- Founded: 2008

Links
- Website: pennmedicine.org/perelman
- Lists: Hospitals in the United States

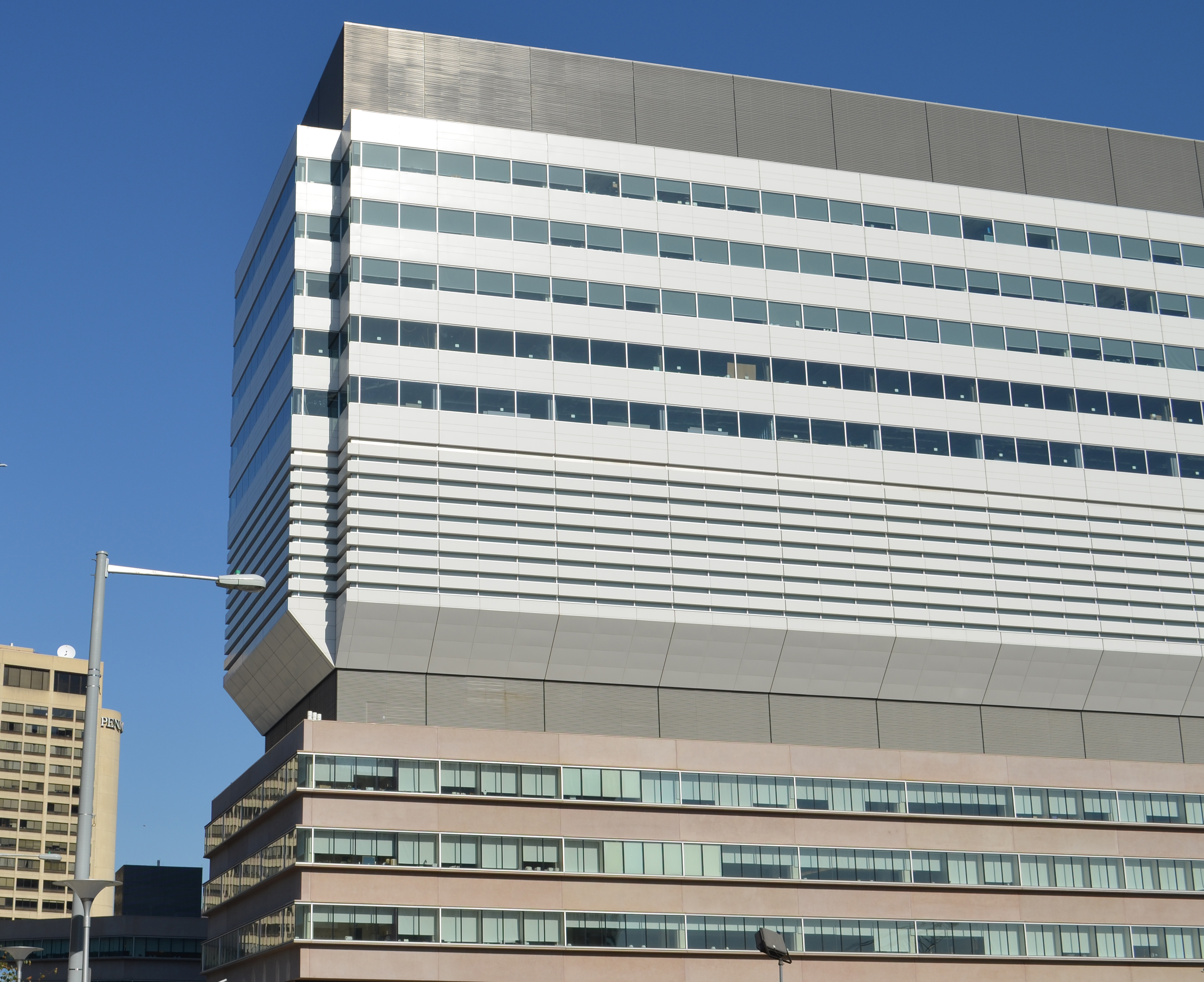
The Smilow Translational Research Center at the Perelman Center for Advanced Medicine

The Ruth and Raymond Perelman Center for Advanced Medicine is a specialized medical facility located at 34th Street and Civic Center Boulevard, on the former site of the Philadelphia Civic Center, on the campus of the Hospital of the University of Pennsylvania. The $302-million project was designed by Rafael Viñoly Architects and completed in 2008. It was the largest capital project ever undertaken by the University of Pennsylvania Health System, until the construction of The Pavilion.

The center is home to Penn Medicine's Abramson Cancer Center, radiation oncology, cardiovascular medicine and an outpatient surgical pavilion. One of the most important parts of the Center for Advanced Medicine is the Roberts Proton Therapy Center which houses the largest proton therapy center associated with a medical center in the world. The proton therapy center will be used by both the Walter Reed Army Medical Center and the Children's Hospital of Philadelphia, as well as the Penn Medicine to treat cancer patients.

== See also ==
- Perelman School of Medicine at the University of Pennsylvania
