= Alan Fetterman =

American painter

Alan Roy Fetterman
- Born: September 8, 1958 (age 68); Shamokin, Pennsylvania
- Education: University of Pennsylvania
- Website: https://www.alanfetterman.com

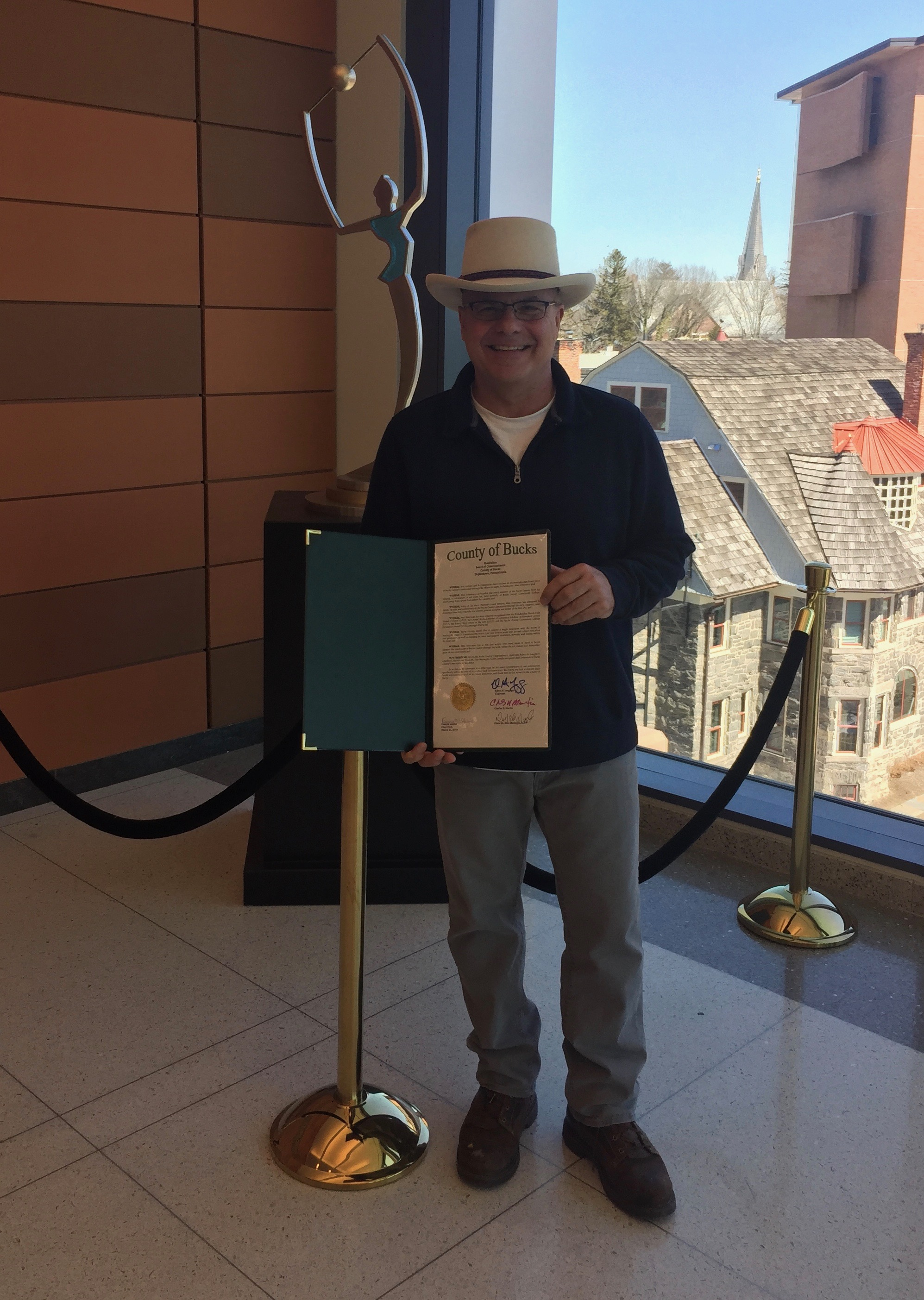
Alan Fetterman at the Bucks County Justice Center with the first Bucks County's Artist in Residence Declaration. Fetterman is positioned in front of his sculpture “Strength Of Liberty”

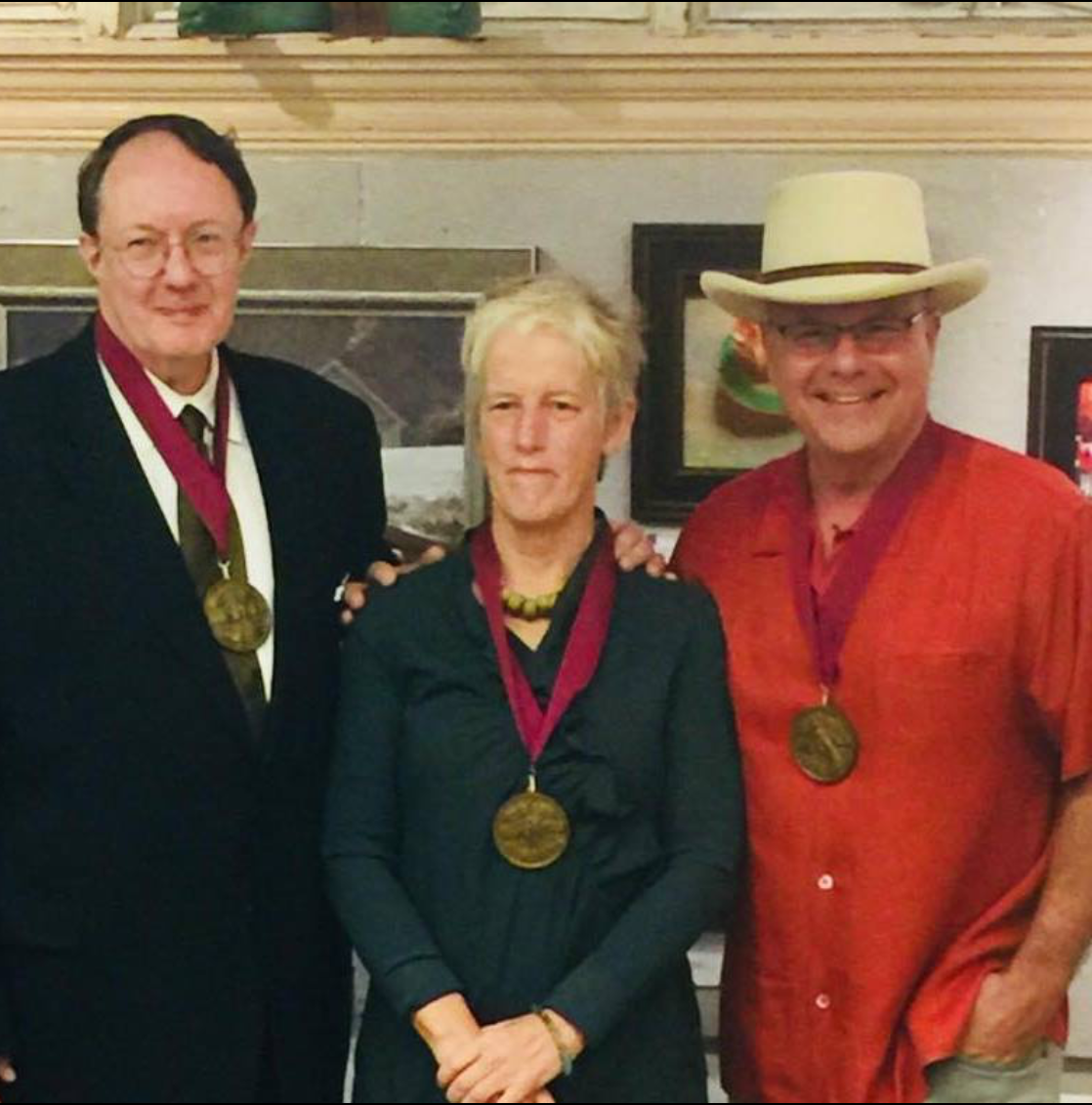
Alan Fetterman receiving the Philadelphia Sketch Club Medal of Honor for Excellence and Contribution to the Arts.

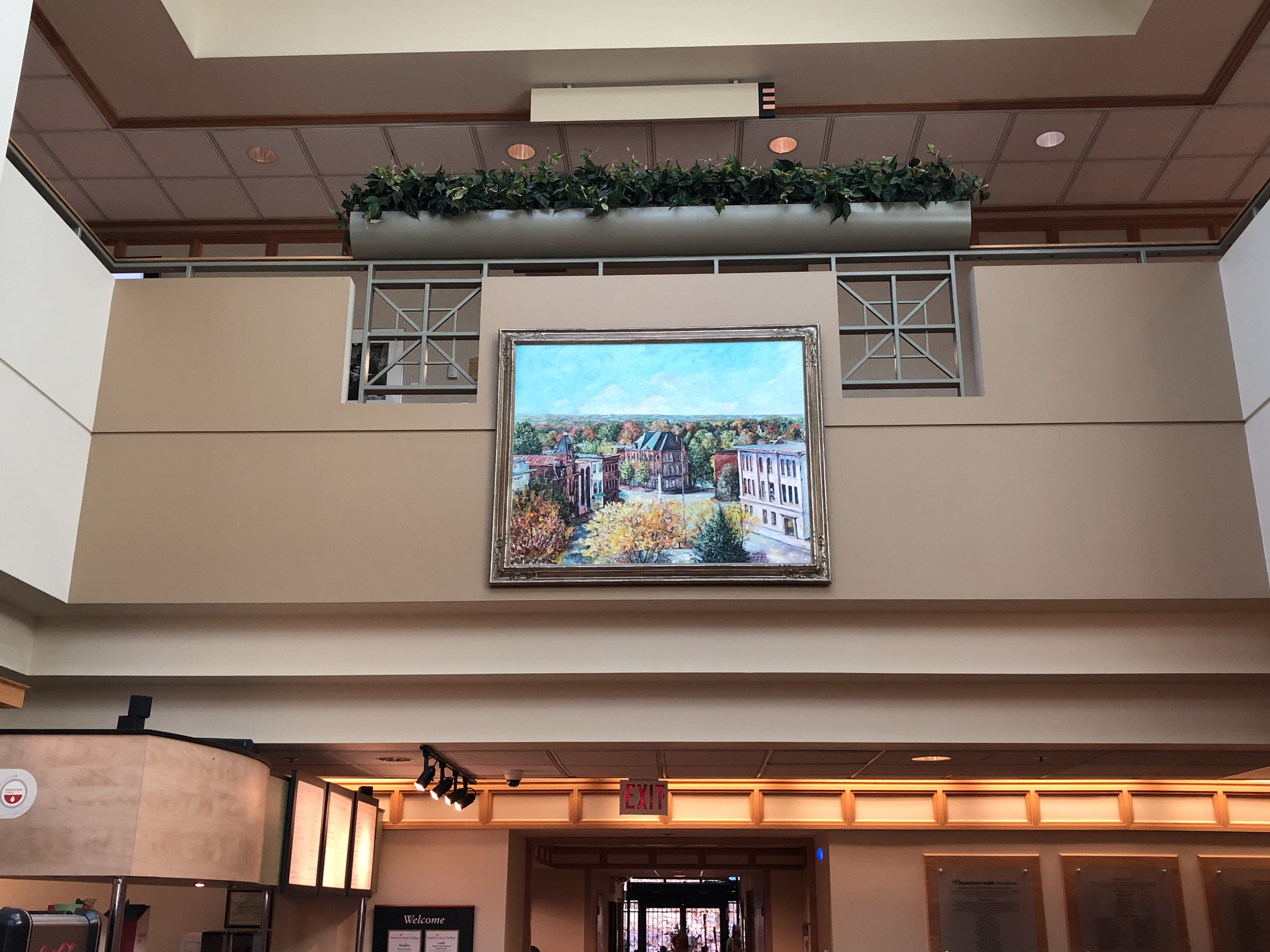
Alan Fetterman "Doylestown At The Turn" On exhibit at the Doylestown Hospital.

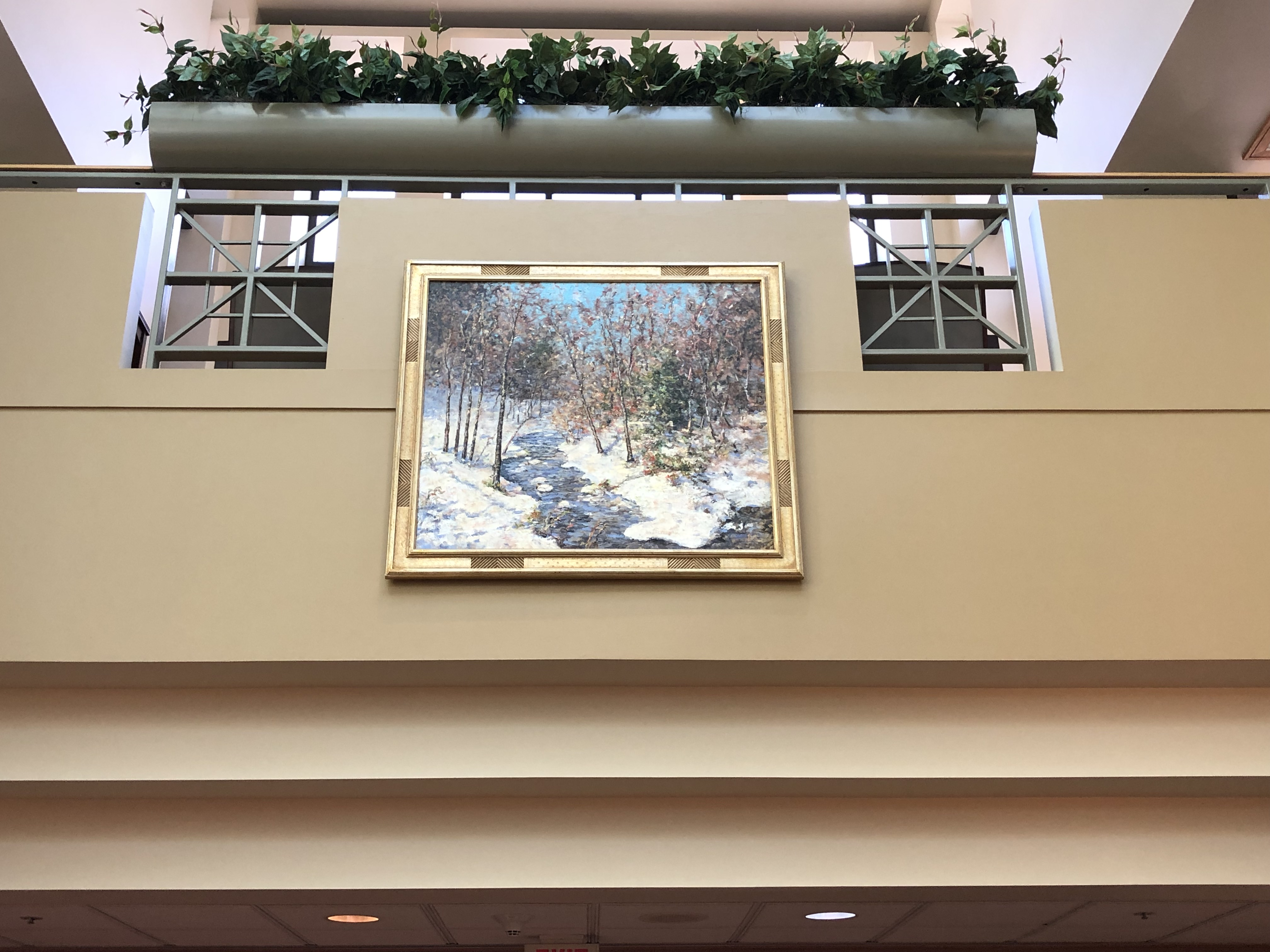
Alan Fetterman "Doylestown Waterways" On exhibit at the Doylestown Hospital.

Alan Fetterman is an American plein air impressionist oil painter from Bucks County in Pennsylvania. He began painting professionally after a trip to the Louvre Museum in Paris, France, when he was 35 years old.

Alan Fetterman was born September 8, 1958, to a military family, moving to Bucks County in 1963. He graduated from Central Bucks East High School in 1976, and he received degree in American Studies from Bucks County Community College in 1998. He is a Kay Scholar in Philosophy from the University of Pennsylvania, earned in 2008. Before becoming a painter, Fetterman worked in construction. He sketched during trips to different parts of the world, and he decided to begin painting professionally after a ten-hour visit to the Louvre.

As of 2015, Fetterman's works had appeared in more than 30 solo exhibitions. In November 2017, the Heritage Conservancy opened its Aldie Mansion headquarters to an exhibit of Fetterman art works re-imagining the 1908 children's book The Wind in the Willows, by Kenneth Grahame. Fetterman's paintings and drawings depicted its characters in Bucks County, instead of their original Thames Valley setting.
