= Penn Medicine Rittenhouse =

- University of Pennsylvania Health System

Geography
- Location: 1800 Lombard Street and 1840 South Street, Philadelphia, PA, United States
- Coordinates: 39.94453°N 75.17314°W

Organization
- Care system: Private
- Type: Specialist
- Affiliated university: Perelman School of Medicine
- Network: University of Pennsylvania Health System

Services
- Beds: 95
- Speciality: Rehabilitation, radiology

History
- Founded: 2007

Links
- Website: pennmedicine.org/rittenhouse
- Lists: Hospitals in the United States

Penn Medicine Rittenhouse is a rehabilitation and long-term acute-care facility in the Southwest Center City neighborhood of Philadelphia founded in 2007. The current facility is owned by the University of Pennsylvania Health System (UPHS) and operated by GSPP Rehabilitation.

The space was formerly occupied by the Graduate Hospital, which opened in 1916, though medical care originally began on the site in 1889 under the name Philadelphia Polyclinic.

== History ==
The origins of the hospital are with the Philadelphia Polyclinic, founded in 1889 in the area of 20th and South Streets in Philadelphia. In 1916, the University of Pennsylvania Graduate School of Medicine established Graduate Hospital as a clinical teaching facility. The hospital was spun off as an independent, non-profit hospital in 1977 after losing money for several years. The hospital was a member of Pittsburgh's Allegheny Health System from 1996 until 1998, when the company went bankrupt, and was part of Tenet Healthcare from 1998 to 2007, when it finally sold back to the University of Pennsylvania Health System and in 2006 it sought to sell this and two other Philadelphia hospitals. At this point, Penn Medicine closed the facility as a full-service hospital and converted it to a specialty medical facility.

== Facilities ==
The main campus includes Penn Medicine Rehabilitation, an inpatient rehabilitation unit of the Hospital of the University of Pennsylvania, a 58-bed inpatient rehabilitation facility managed by GSPP Rehabilitation. Previously known as Good Shepherd Penn Partners, GSPP Rehabilitation was formed by Penn Medicine and Good Shepherd Rehabilitation.

Penn Medicine | Good Shepherd Rehabilitation Specialty Hospital is a long-term acute care facility that is also located on the Penn Medicine Rittenhouse campus and managed by GSPP Rehabilitation.

It also houses a medical simulation facility. The second building, known as the Tuttleman Center, houses a 37-bed outpatient ambulatory surgical center and a radiology department.
