= Isaac Chen =

American neurosurgeon

Han-chiao Isaac Chen is a neurosurgeon at the Presbyterian Medical Center of Philadelphia and the Veteran's Administration Medical Center. The Chen Laboratory works to "develop novel methods for restoring the function of the brain after it has been damaged by combining aspects of stem cell biology, neural tissue engineering, and neural interface technologies."

In November 2017 it was reported that a team including Chen has successfully implanted brain organoids into rodents.

Dr. Chen has made notable contributions to the field of human brain organoids. His work in the Cell journal Stem Cell discusses the controversial topic of the ethics of brain chimeras.

== Education ==
He graduated from Harvard University in 2002 with a BA in Biochemical Sciences followed by an MD from the University of Pennsylvania in 2007.
