= University of Pennsylvania Health System =

Hospital system in Pennsylvania, US

Penn Medicine
- Trade name: Penn Medicine
- Type: Private hospital network
- Industry: Health care
- Founded: 1993; 33 years ago in Philadelphia, Pennsylvania, US
- Headquarters: Philadelphia, Pennsylvania, US
- Number of locations: 7 hospitals, 10 multispecialty centers, doctors' offices, clinics & sites
- Areas served: Philadelphia metropolitan area Central Jersey; South Central Pennsylvania
- Key people: Kevin B. Mahoney (CEO); Jonathan A. Epstein (interim EVP)
- Services: Hospital network
- Owner: Trustees of the University of Pennsylvania
- Website: pennmedicine.org

The University of Pennsylvania Health System (UPHS) is a major multi-hospital health system headquartered in Philadelphia, Pennsylvania. UPHS and the Perelman School of Medicine at the University of Pennsylvania together comprise Penn Medicine, a clinical and research entity of the University of Pennsylvania. UPHS hospitals include the Hospital of the University of Pennsylvania, Penn Presbyterian Medical Center, Pennsylvania Hospital, Chester County Hospital, Lancaster General Hospital, Princeton Medical Center, and Doylestown Hospital.

The UPHS is home to the first hospital in the United States, Pennsylvania Hospital.

== History ==
The Chester County Hospital and Health System joined UPHS in 2013. Two years later, Lancaster General Health (LG Health) joined the UPHS family. Princeton Health officially merged into UPHS in January 2018. UPHS added Doylestown Hospital as its seventh hospital in 2025.

Phoenixville Hospital in Phoenixville, Pennsylvania, was previously part of the UPHS network but was sold to Community Health Systems in 2004. Phoenixville Hospital was sold again by CHS to Tower Health in 2017.

In 2020, University of Pennsylvania-Penn Presbyterian was ranked as the 15th best hospital in the United States by the U.S. News & World Report.

== Major facilities ==
Facility	Location	Type of facility	Year opened	Year joined UPHS	Notes
Hospital of the University of Pennsylvania	University City, Philadelphia, Pennsylvania	Teaching	1874	1993	First university-owned teaching hospital in the United States
Pennsylvania Hospital	Center City, Philadelphia	Teaching	1751	1993	First hospital of the United States
Penn Presbyterian Medical Center	University City, Philadelphia	Teaching	1871	1995	Houses Penn's departments of Orthopaedics and Ophthalmology, in addition to long-term care and nursing home facilities
Chester County Hospital	West Chester, PA	Teaching	1892	2013	
Lancaster General Hospital	Lancaster, PA	Teaching	1893	2015	Part of the Penn Medicine Lancaster General Health network
Princeton Medical Center	Plainsboro Township, NJ	Teaching	1919	2018	Part of the Penn Medicine Princeton Health network
Doylestown Hospital	Doylestown, PA	Teaching	1923	2025	Part of Penn Medicine Doylestown Health network.
Perelman Center for Advanced Medicine	University City, Philadelphia	Specialist	2008	2008	Houses the Abramson Cancer Center and Roberts Proton Therapy Center
Penn Medicine University City	University City, Philadelphia	Specialist			Home to the Penn Musculoskeletal Center
Penn Medicine Rittenhouse	Southwest Center City, Philadelphia	Rehabilitation	1916	1997	Houses the Penn Medicine Institute for Rehabilitation Medicine (operated by Good Shepherd Penn Partners) and the Specialty Hospital at Rittenhouse
Penn Medicine Radnor	Radnor Township, PA	Outpatient			Comprehensive primary and specialized outpatient care.
Penn Medicine Cherry Hill	Cherry Hill, NJ	Outpatient			
Women & Babies Hospital	Lancaster, PA	Specialist	2000	2015	Specialty hospital for babies and women of all ages, part of the Lancaster General Health network
Lancaster Rehabilitation Hospital	Lancaster, PA	Rehabilitation	2007	2015	Part of the Penn Medicine Lancaster General Health network, co-owned by Kindred Healthcare
Lancaster Behavioral Health Hospital	Lancaster, PA	Psychiatric hospital			Part of the Penn Medicine Lancaster General Health network, co-owned by Universal Health Services
