= Doylestown Hospital =

Hospital in Doylestown, Pennsylvania

- University of Pennsylvania Health System

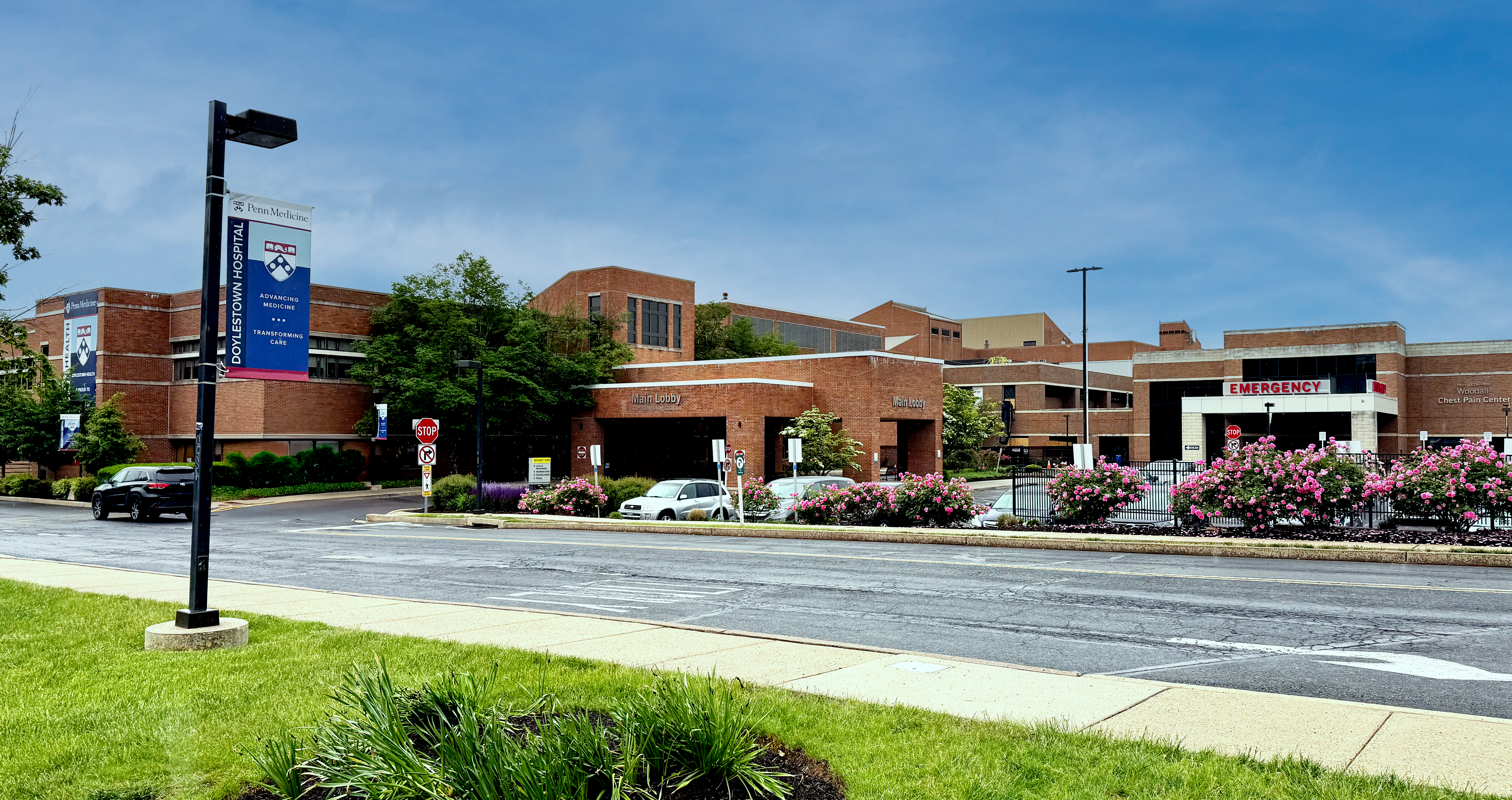
- The hospital's main lobby and emergency department entrance in 2025.

Geography
- Location: 595 West State Street, Doylestown, Pennsylvania, United States
- Coordinates: 40°18′21″N 75°08′48″W

Organization
- Care system: Private
- Type: General
- Affiliated university: Perelman School of Medicine
- Network: University of Pennsylvania Health System

Services
- Beds: 245

Helipads
- Helipad: FAA LID: 9PS3
Number	Length		Surface
Number	ft	m	Surface
H1	65	20	Asphalt

History
- Former name: Doylestown Emergency Hospital
- Founded: October 9, 1923; 103 years ago

Links
- Website: doylestownhealth.org
- Lists: Hospitals in Pennsylvania

Doylestown Hospital, officially Penn Medicine Doylestown Hospital, is a non-profit university-affiliated community hospital in Doylestown Township, Pennsylvania. Established as an eight-bed emergency hospital by the Village Improvement Association (VIA), it has expanded into a 245-bed general hospital. It joined the University of Pennsylvania Health System (UPHS) as its seventh hospital and serves as the flagship institution of Penn Medicine Doylestown Health.

Recognizing the need for local medical infrastructure, the VIA established the Doylestown Emergency Hospital in 1923 with a focus on emergency and maternity care. Over the following decades, the hospital expanded in both size and services, moving to a larger facility in 1939 and again in 1975 to accommodate the growing local population. The institution was renamed Doylestown Hospital in 1957 to reflect its expansion into general and specialized care. In 1985, the VIA restructured its ownership as a health system, later named Doylestown Health. Further expansion and modernization included the addition of a free clinic in 1994, an outpatient center in 2001, a cancer institute in 2011, and a critical care pavilion in 2021.

Doylestown Hospital and Doylestown Health struggled financially through the COVID-19 pandemic, and were acquired by UPHS in 2025. The hospital has been involved in education through programs for resident doctors, physician assistant students, and nursing students. It has been recognized in regional and national rankings.

== History ==
=== Village Improvement Association and Doylestown Emergency Hospital: 1895–1957 ===
The Village Improvement Association (VIA)—a women-only civic organization—was formed on April 26, 1895 by a group of 14 women from Doylestown, Pennsylvania to "promote the health and beauty of the town". Initially, their efforts were focused on controlling road dust, managing waste, and beautifying public spaces through trees and planting. At that time, there was no hospital in or near Doylestown, requiring special transportation arrangements for patients in need of hospitalization. To address local health needs, the VIA established a Hospital Fund in 1907 with endorsements from local physicians.

During the 1918–1920 flu pandemic, the VIA rented rooms on Broad Street to operate temporary emergency rooms. In 1922, they purchased a property at Pine Street and Oakland Avenue for US$6,000 ($115,408 in 2025) to serve as an emergency hospital. Doylestown Emergency Hospital officially opened on October 9, 1923, with eight beds. It often operated at full capacity, generating a revenue of US$161.25 ($3,029 in 2025) in May 1924 for instance.

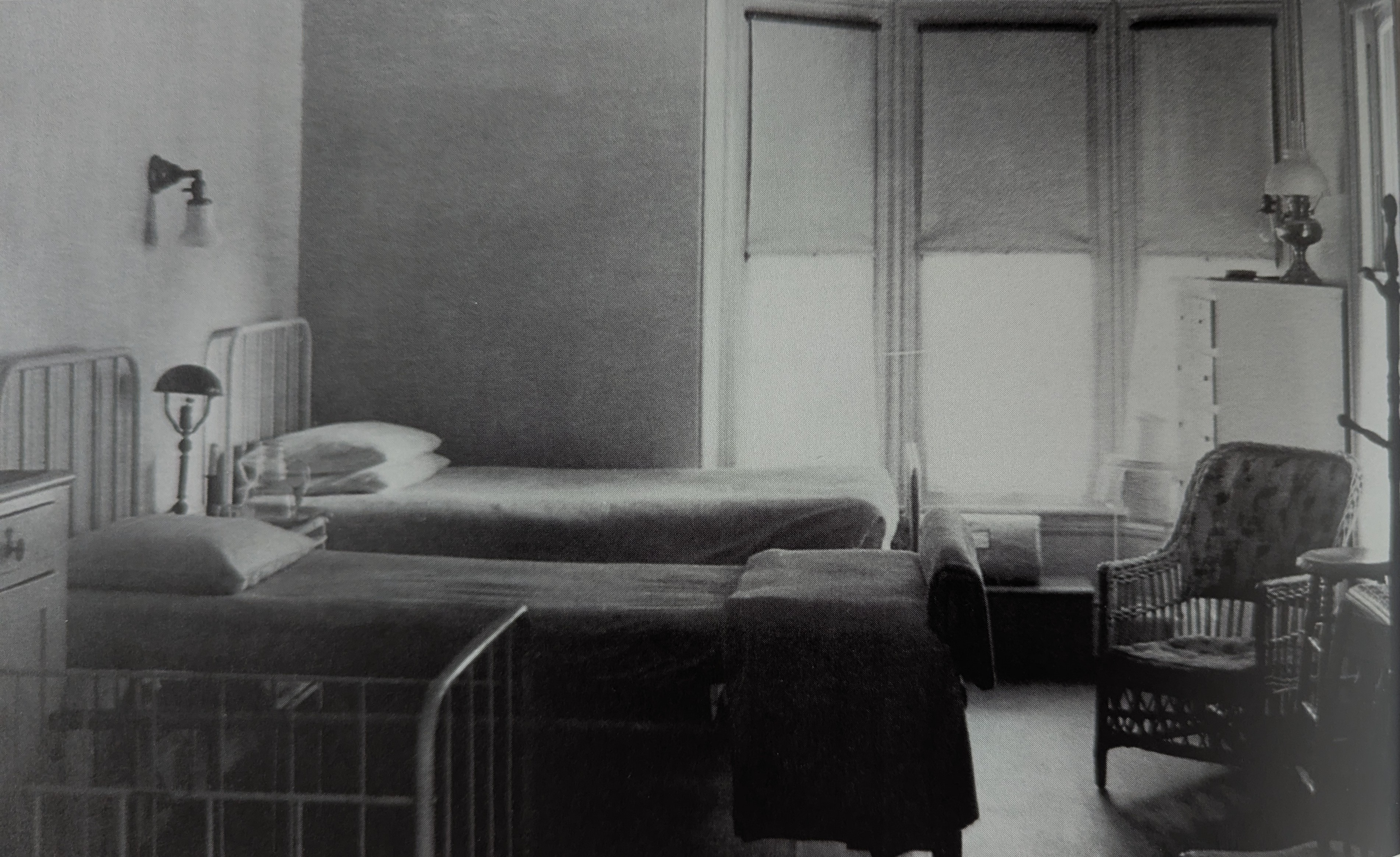
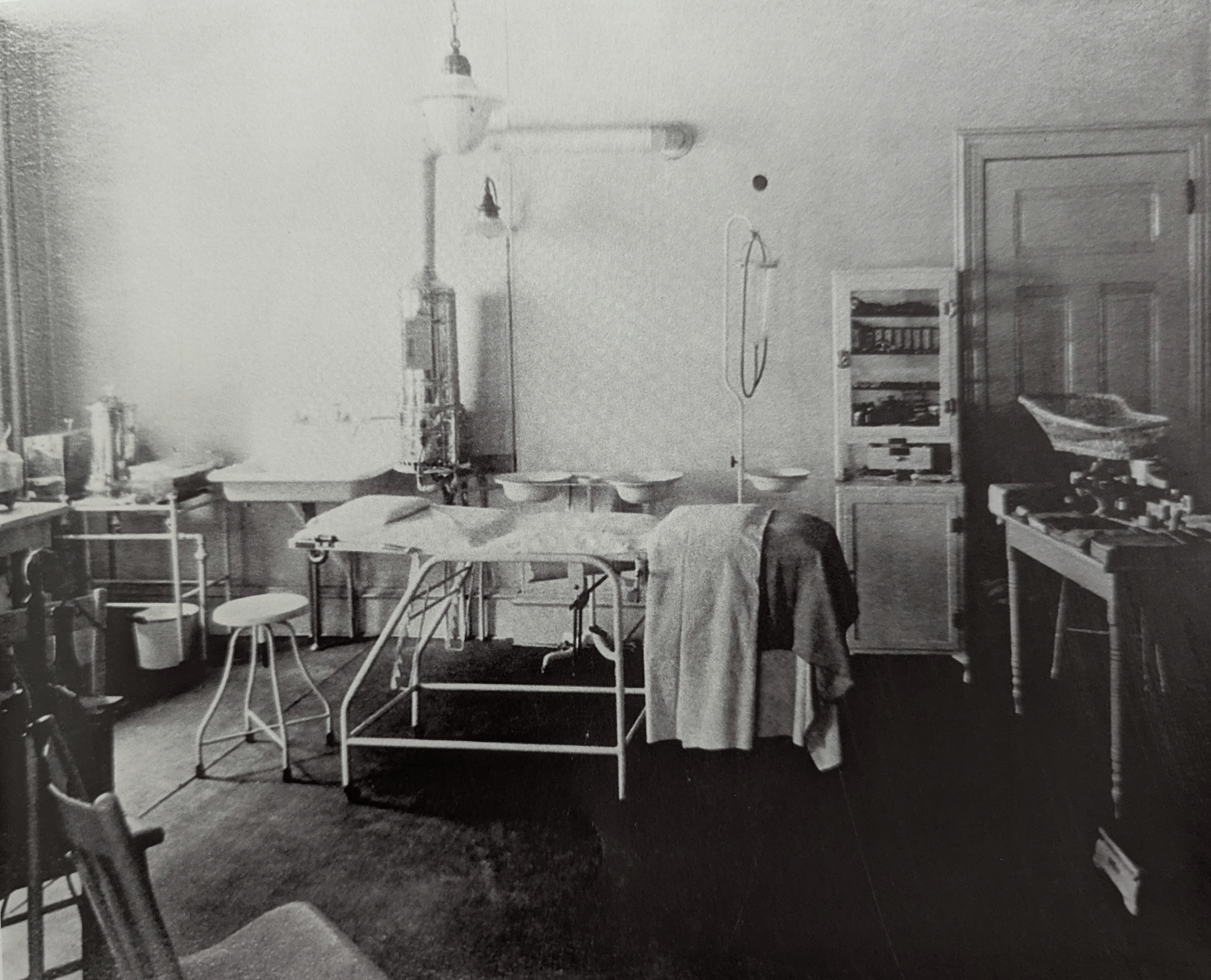
In 1923, the daily expense of using a hospital bed (left) was US$2.5 ($47.24 in 2025) and an operating room (right) cost US$10 ($188.96 in 2025).

Doylestown Emergency Hospital had 14 beds and eight cribs by 1927. In its first decade, the hospital offered emergency services, minor surgeries, X-rays, and visiting nurses, as well as pediatric and maternity clinics. The VIA supported the hospital financially through community donations, while the American Red Cross provided staff support for the visiting nurses program in its early days. It cost the hospital 49c. ($12.19 in 2025) to care for one patient per day in 1933. The hospital admitted 62 patients through June 1934, and had a census of 22 on July 1.

The American Medical Association had previously declined to register the hospital in 1929 unless it was assured that osteopaths would not be permitted to treat patients; in 1936, the hospital's governing committee voted to bar all osteopaths except one previously affiliated with the facility. A 1940 motion to exclude all osteopaths failed, but the hospital continued to limit surgeries performed by its lone osteopath to circumcisions only, prompting his resignation.

As the local population grew, the hospital became increasingly overcrowded. In 1938, the VIA contracted AC Elfman & Sons to build a larger hospital building on a two-acre property at Belmont Avenue and Spruce Street. At a cost of US$80,000 ($1.83 million in 2025) the new facility became functional on January 21, 1939, expanding its capacity to 21 beds. In addition to services offered at the previous location, the new facility housed a maternity, nursery, medical and medical-surgical wards. It also had a separate accident unit, sterilization room and an in-house laboratory. The Veterans of Foreign Wars raised US$1,800 ($41,366 in 2025) for updated X-ray equipment in 1940.

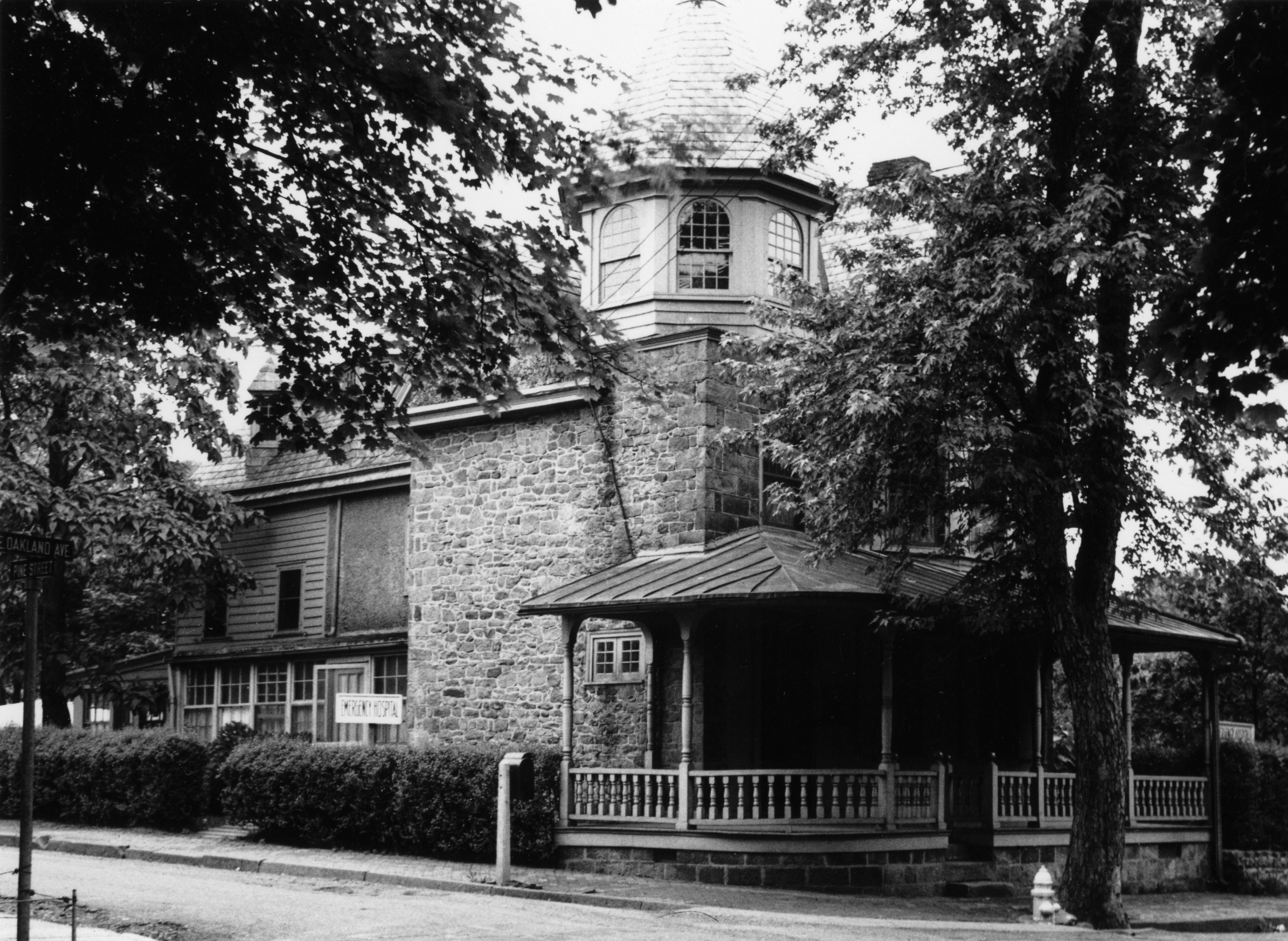
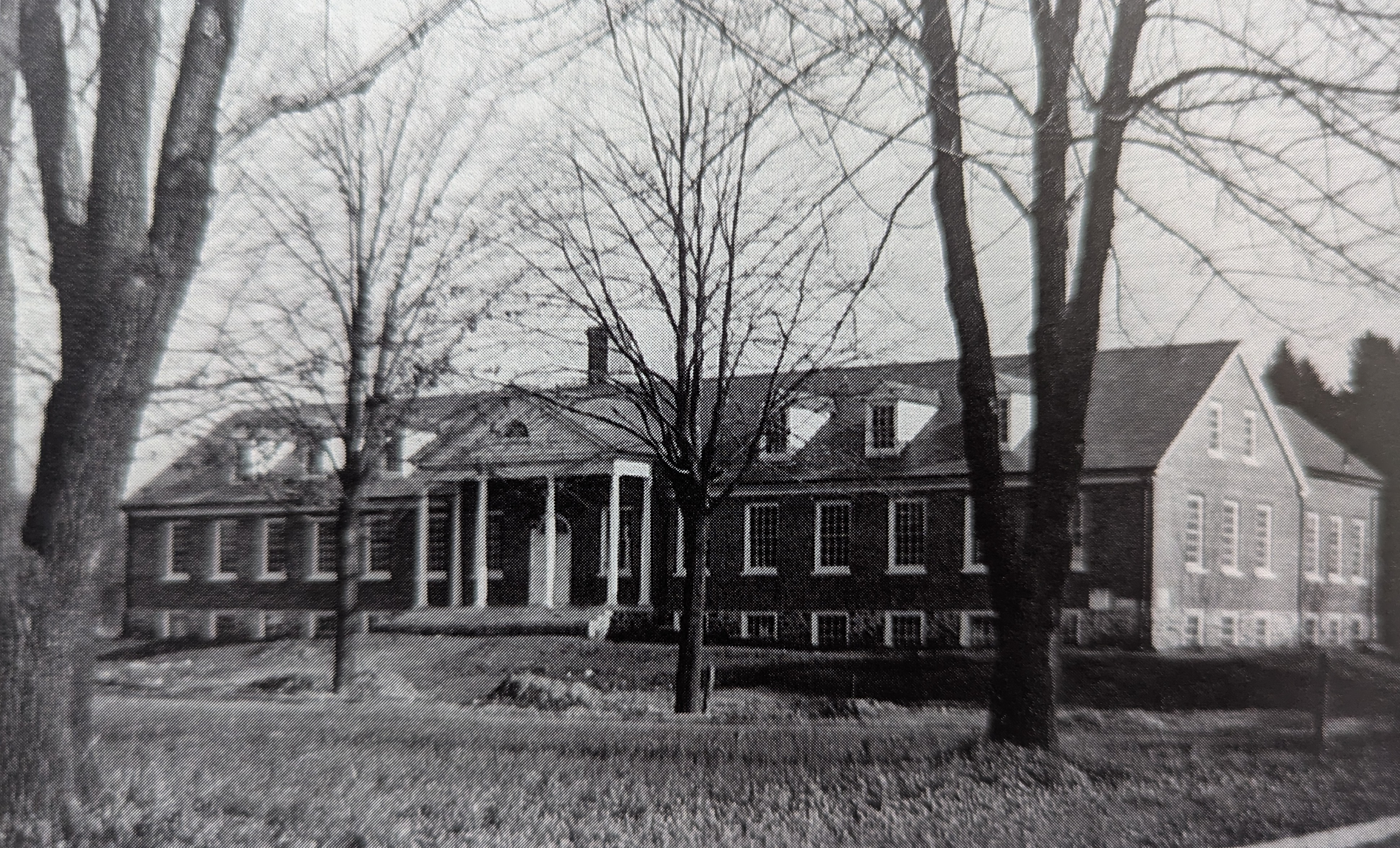
Local volunteers, the hospital staff and their family members helped move equipment and patients from its 1923 location (left) to the new facility (right) in 1939.

The Second World War led to supply shortages, particularly of food items. The local community helped the Doylestown Emergency Hospital stock its pantry through wartime; by January 1943, 1150 cans of vegetables and fruits were donated to the hospital by individuals and organizations in the area. In response to the post-war baby boom and increasing maternity needs, the VIA expanded the hospital with a two-story addition, including two delivery rooms, a second nursery and a children's ward. The new wing became operational in 1951 and increased the hospital capacity to 54 beds.

Following equipment upgrades, Doylestown Emergency Hospital applied for Joint Commission accreditation in 1953, which was approved two years later. In 1954, the visiting nurses' service began a follow-up program for discharged patients, launched a "cancer detection clinic" in collaboration with the American Cancer Society, and opened a child health clinic in Warminster. In 1956, the hospital used a US$29,700 ($351,711 in 2025) grant from the Ford Foundation to build a mortuary.

=== Doylestown Hospital and Doylestown Health: 1957–2025 ===
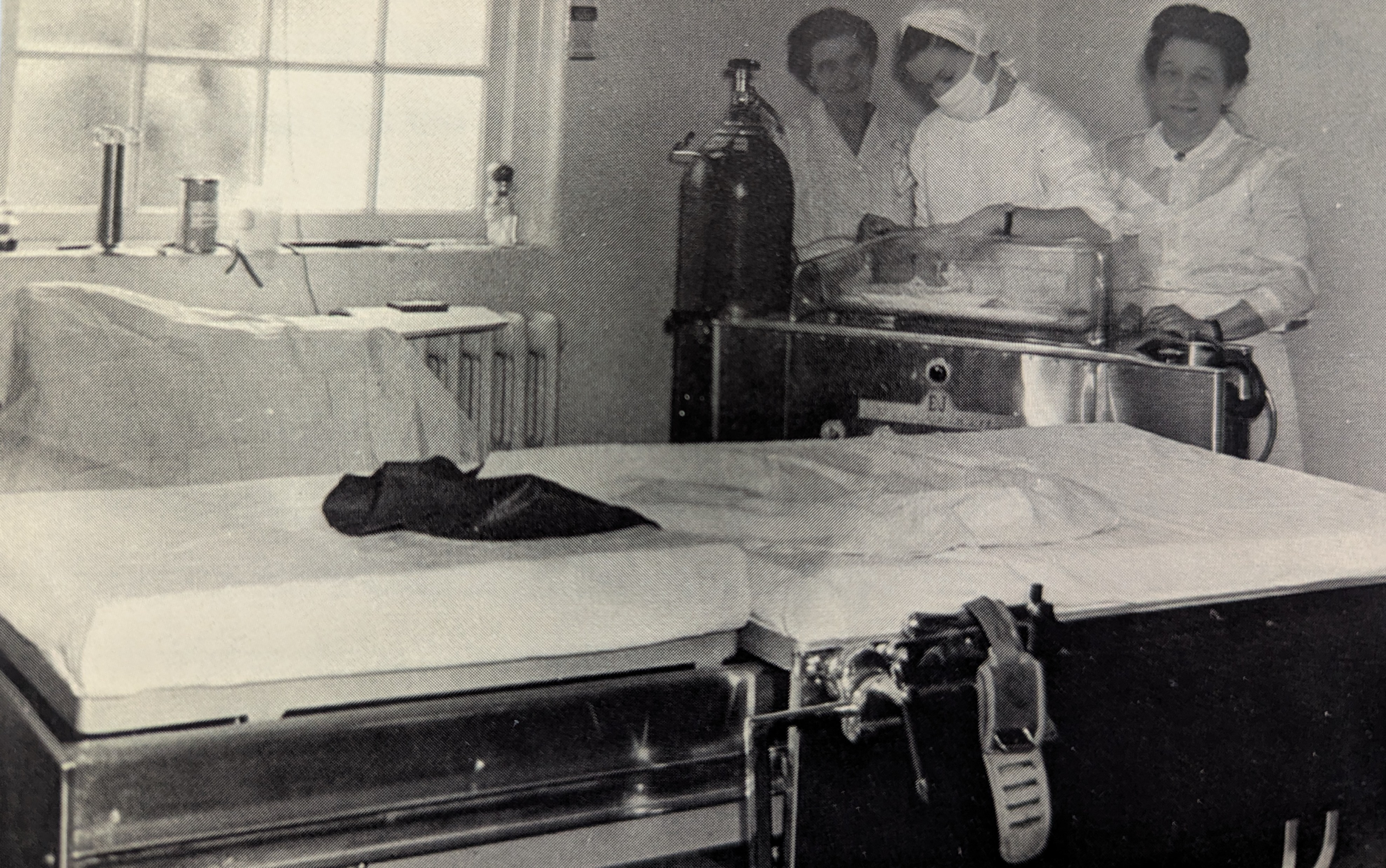
By the 1960s, the hospital began requiring physicians in specialties such as obstetrics and neonatology (delivery room and newborn incubator pictured) to have formal training and certification.

Anticipating a shift toward a general hospital model, the facility was renamed Doylestown Hospital in 1957. A US$1.5 million ($16.3 million in 2025) 85-bed extension was completed on Belmont Avenue in 1960. Doylestown Hospital provided primary care, emergency medicine, hospital medicine, general surgery, pediatric, obstetrics and gynaecology care through the 1960s, later adding ENT, urology, orthopedics, cardiology and psychiatry. The hospital added its first intensive care unit in 1966, and further extensions brought capacity to 129 beds.

In collaboration with the Bucks County Planning Commission, the VIA sought a new site to serve the growing population. In 1971, the VIA acquired 50 acres of Delaware Valley University campus on West State Street for US$332,934 ($2.65 million in 2025). A subsidized federal loan of US$5–7 million was granted in 1972 under the Hospital Survey and Construction Act, and the new 165-bed hospital opened on November 2, 1975, at a cost of US$12.6 million ($75.4 million in 2025).

A partnership with Lenape Valley Foundation added an 18-bed behavioral health unit, raising total capacity to 183 beds in 1978. The hospital established a bond authority in 1979 to issue tax-exempt bonds. The hospital launched a hospice program in 1983, and installed its first CT scanner in 1984 for US$998,000 ($3.09 million in 2025). In 1985, it opened Children's Village, a daycare center for staff children. The VIA and Doylestown Hospital underwent restructuring in the mid-1980s. The hospital became a separate legal entity under the newly created VIA Health System, though the VIA retained majority control of the governing board. A dedicated Doylestown Health Foundation was established to manage philanthropy and investments.

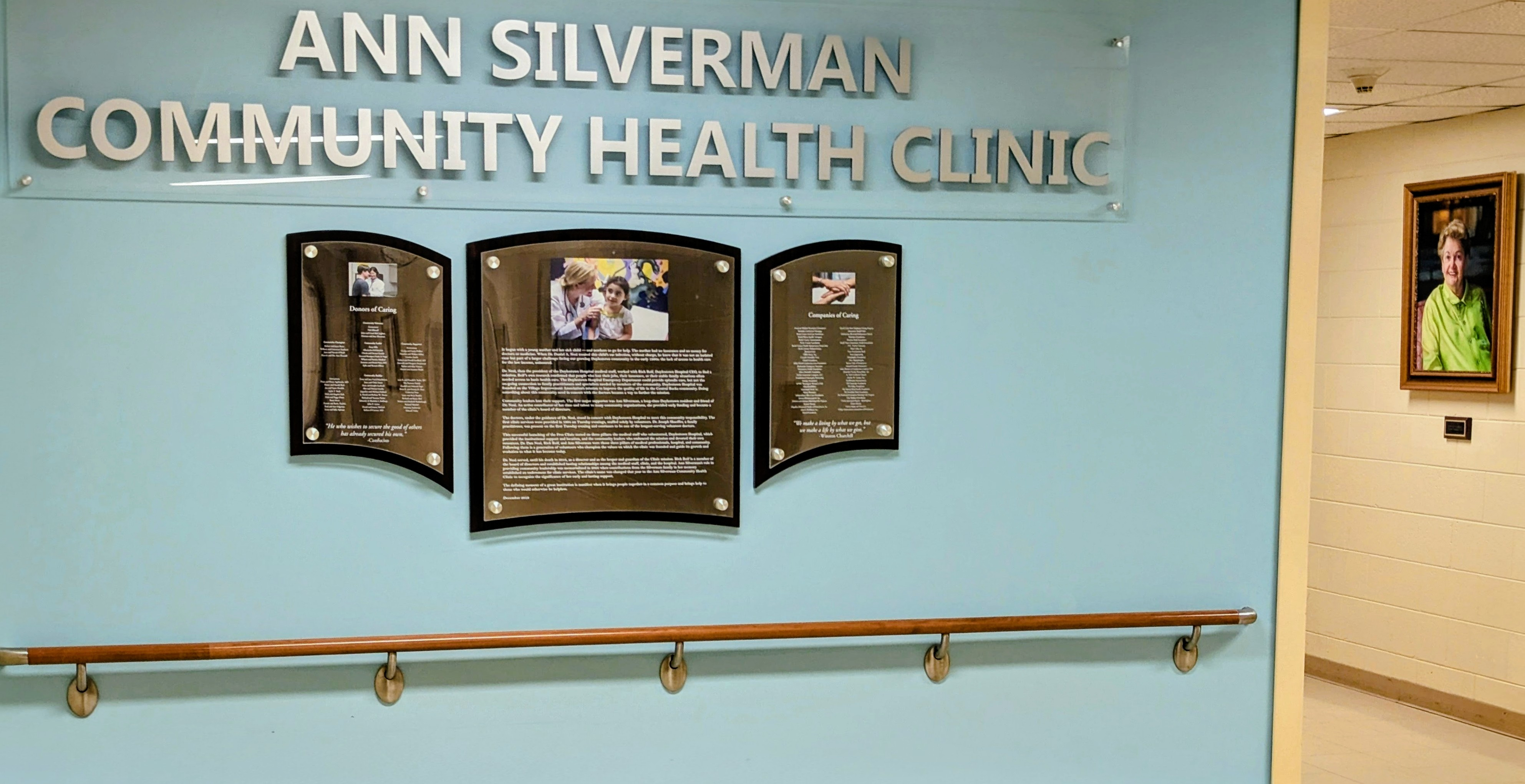
In 2008, the free clinic was renamed after Ann Silverman (portrait by Lucille Morgnanesi on the right), one of its founders who left an endowment of US$500,000 ($747,682 in 2025).

A new main wing was built to house critical care, emergency, radiology, laboratory, surgical services, post-anesthesia care unit, cardiac catheterization and rehabilitation in 1991. The hospital acquired Pine Run, a senior living facility in New Britain in 1992. The hospital established the Free Clinic of Doylestown in 1994—funded by Doylestown Health Foundation, the clinic was run by volunteer physicians providing primary and specialized care to patients with financial insecurity. It served 360 patients in its first year, increasing to 2,051 by 1998. That year, an 18-bed long-term care unit for discharged patients requiring transitional skilled-nursing care was added.

In 1997, Doylestown Hospital, Grand View Hospital (now St. Luke's Grand View Hospital) in Sellersville and North Penn Hospital (now Jefferson Lansdale Hospital) in Lansdale formed Trinity Health Care Alliance for care coordination and supply chain management. The hospital established the Heart Center of Doylestown Hospital in 2000. The Health & Wellness Center by Doylestown Hospital, a US$124 million ($225 million in 2025) outpatient facility in Warrington, became functional in 2001; the center offered diagnostic services, physician clinics, pharmacy, and aquatic therapy. Pennsylvania Department of Community and Economic Development granted Doylestown Hospital US$11.1 million ($16.7 million in 2025) to be used towards a planned 2009 US$87 million ($131 million in 2025) expansion of the hospital's emergency department.

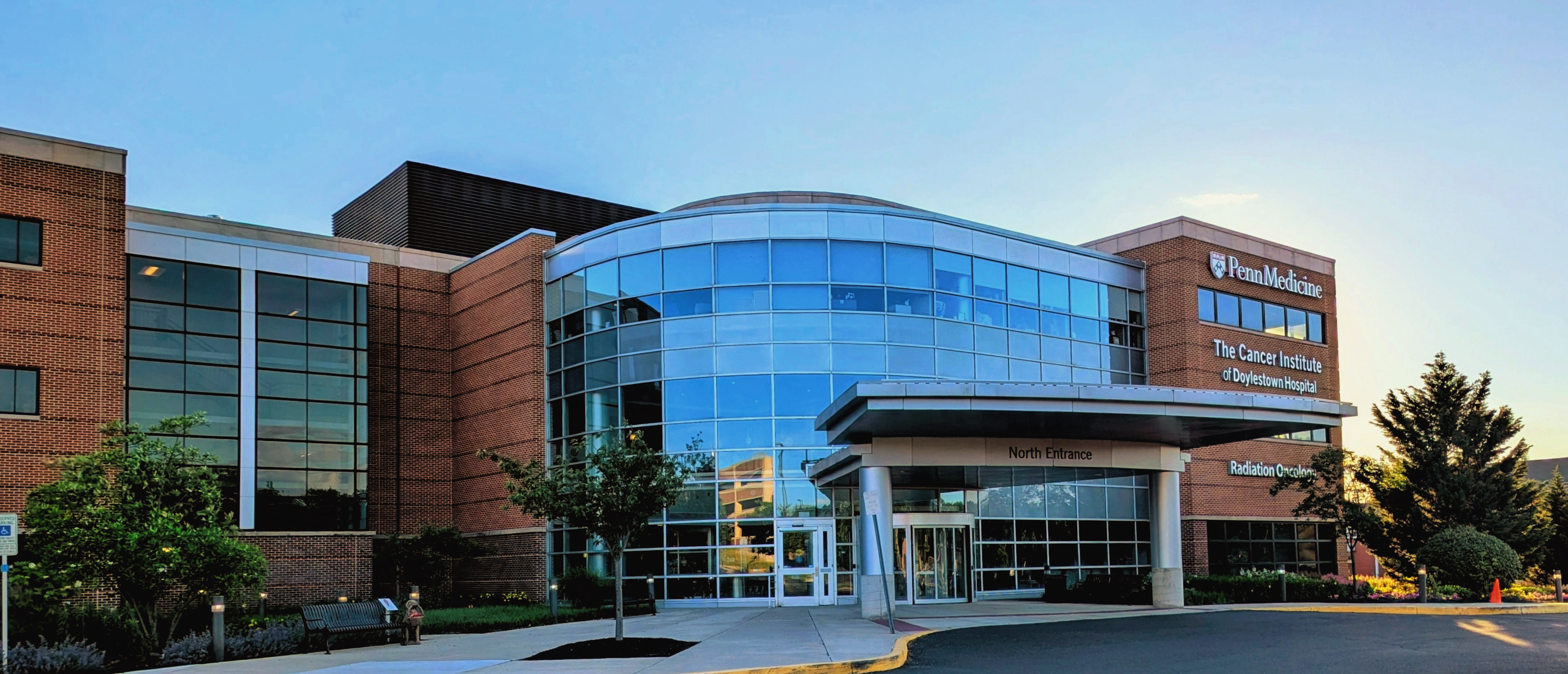
The Cancer Institute of Doylestown Hospital collaborated with the Hospital of the University of Pennsylvania's radiation oncology department to offer treatment.

The Cancer Institute of Doylestown Hospital opened in 2011, offering diagnostics, radiation therapy and chemotherapy infusion suites. The hospital partnered with MossRehab to run a 12-bed acute rehabilitation unit, and established an outpatient wound care center in 2012. A six-bed pediatric inpatient unit opened in 2014 but closed in 2022 due to declining admissions. In 2015, VIA Health System changed its name to Doylestown Health.

A tornado severely damaged Children's Village in 2020; it was fully reconstructed by 2023. The hospital further expanded in 2020 with the opening of an ambulatory center focusing on physical, occupational and speech therapies, and in 2021 with the addition of a US$54 million ($64.2 million in 2025) Cardiovascular & Critical Care Pavilion. A former director of medical staff at the hospital was charged with embezzling US$604,702.29 ($718,469 in 2025) from the employee charity fund between 2008 and 2021. After repaying the full amount in restitution, she pleaded guilty and was sentenced to five years of probation in 2024.

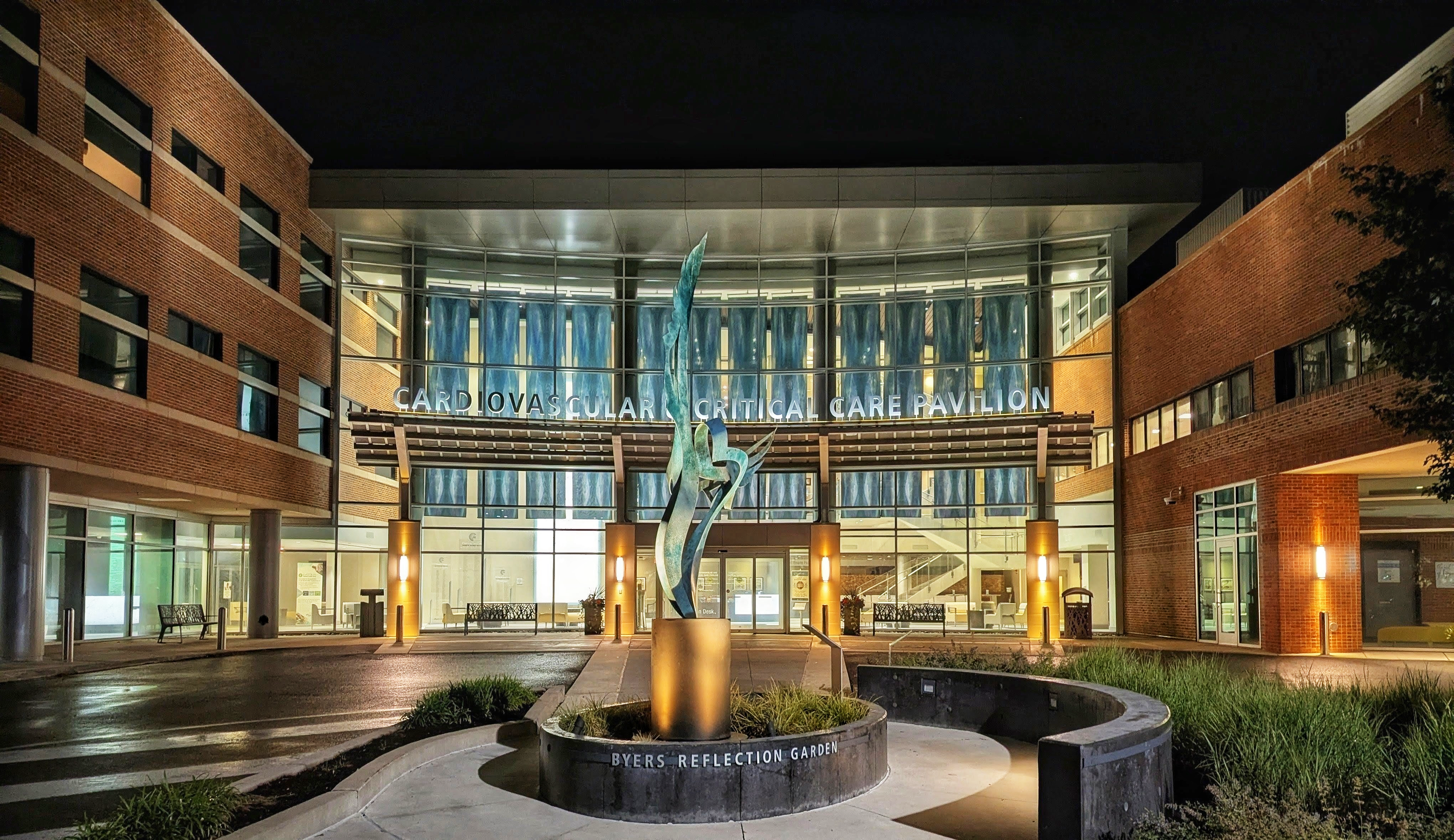
The Cardiovascular & Critical Care Pavilion provided additional 58 beds to the hospital.

Doylestown Hospital suspended elective care in response to the COVID-19 pandemic, and instituted a vaccine mandate during the COVID-19 pandemic. In 2021, its chief of cardiac surgery was terminated for refusing the vaccine; a subsequent wrongful dismissal suit was settled through mediation. By 2023, Doylestown Health had accumulated US$222 million ($235 million in 2025) in long-term debt, US$70 million ($74 million in 2025) of which stemmed from losses incurred due to the pandemic. Moody's Ratings and S&P Global Ratings assigned "extremely low credit ratings" to the health system due to depleting financial reserves. In an effort to reduce its debt, Doylestown Health sold Pine Run to Presbyterian Senior Living for US$80.6 million ($85.2 million in 2025) in 2023. During the 2024 fiscal year, it reported US$466.8 million in revenue (improved from US$417.9 million in 2023) and a net operating loss of US$−8.1 million (improved from US$−19.2 million in 2023).

=== Penn Medicine Doylestown Hospital: 2025–present ===
The University of Pennsylvania Health System (UPHS) acquired Doylestown Health on April 1, 2025, renaming it Penn Medicine Doylestown Health. Doylestown Hospital—then a 245-bed teaching hospital—became the seventh hospital in the UPHS network, as Penn Medicine Doylestown Hospital. UPHS assumed responsibility of some of its US$163 million long-term debt that it had outstanding by 2025. At the time of the acquisition, it had been the country's only hospital to be founded and continually managed by a women-only organization – the VIA.

== Education ==
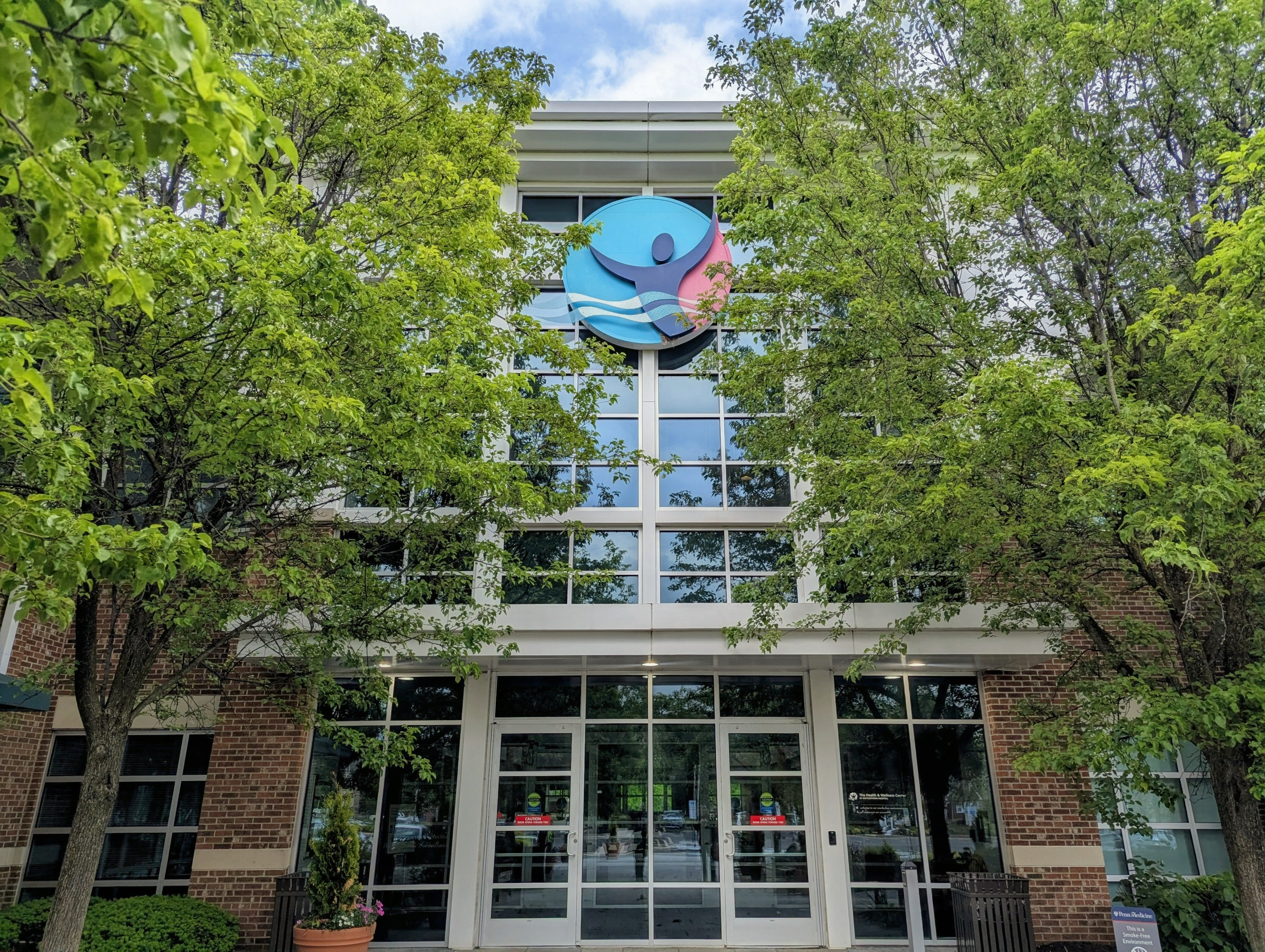
The family medicine residency practice is located at the Health & Wellness Center.

When the hospital opened in 1923, it established a training program for community nurses. Between 1975 and 1995, it operated a school of radiologic technology. The hospital began a pharmacy residency in 2021, family medicine residency in 2023, and a transitional internship in 2024. The hospital has served as a clinical site for the physician assistant master's program at Delaware Valley University, and nursing programs at La Salle University and Bucks County Community College.

== Rankings ==
Doylestown Hospital was ranked among the "Top 50 Cardiovascular Hospitals in the United States" by Thomson Reuters in 2012. In U.S. News & World Report's "Best Hospitals" 2021–22 rankings, the hospital was #6 in the Philadelphia metropolitan area and #12 in Pennsylvania. It received "high performing" designations for treating heart failure, kidney failure, stroke and chronic obstructive pulmonary disease, and for colon cancer, heart bypass, aortic valve repair, back, hip and knee surgeries. In 2022, Newsweek and Statista ranked the hospital #7 in Pennsylvania and #119 nationally in their "World's Best Hospitals" list. Healthgrades listed Doylestown Hospital in its top five percent of hospitals in the country for "safety and patient experience" in 2026.
