= Jonathan A. Epstein =

American cellular biologist and cardiologist

Jonathan A. Epstein is an American cellular biologist, cardiologist, and academic administrator serving as the interim executive vice president of the University of Pennsylvania Health System and dean of the Raymond and Ruth Perelman School of Medicine since 2023.

== Life ==
A cellular biologist and cardiologist, Epstein joined the University of Pennsylvania in 1996. He was the chair of the department of cell and developmental biology and scientific director of the Penn Cardiovascular Institute from 2006 to 2015. In 2007, he was a founding co-director of the Penn Institute for Regenerative Medicine. Epstein is the William Wikoff Smith professor, executive vice dean and chief scientific officer of Perelman School of Medicine at the University of Pennsylvania. In February 2021, he also became the senior vice president and chief scientific officer of the University of Pennsylvania Health System. In 2023, he began serving as the interim executive vice president of the University of Pennsylvania for the Health System and dean of the school of medicine.

Epstein was elected to the American Academy of Arts and Sciences in 2011. He is a fellow of the American Heart Association and an elected member of the Association of American Physicians and the National Academy of Medicine. He is a past president of the American Society for Clinical Investigation.

He earned degrees from Harvard College and Harvard Medical School.
