= Hospital of the University of Pennsylvania =

- University of Pennsylvania Health System

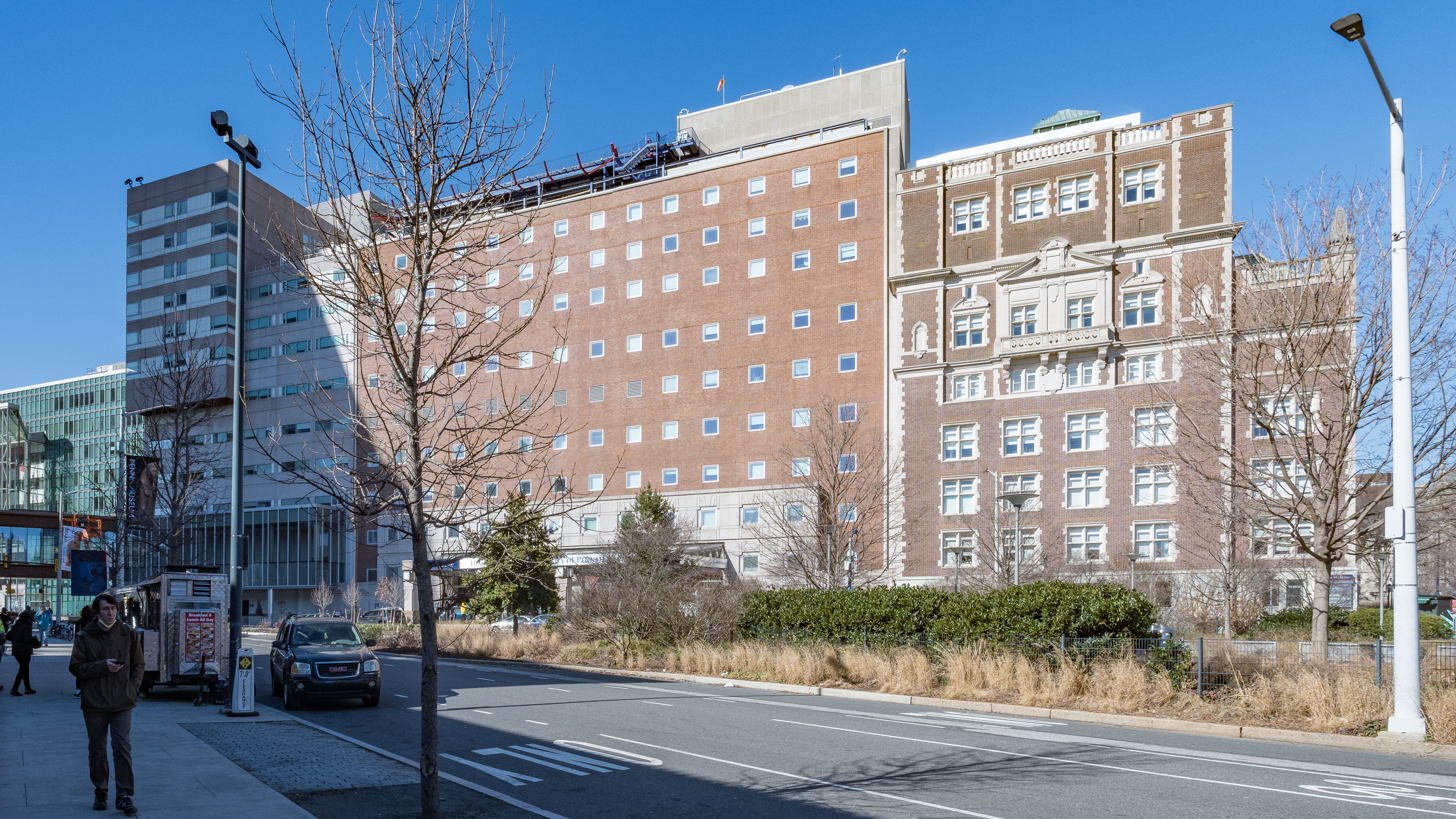

- The Hospital of the University of Pennsylvania in Philadelphia, Pennsylvania

Geography
- Location: 3400 Spruce Street, Philadelphia, Pennsylvania, United States
- Coordinates: 39.95°N 75.1936°W

Organization
- Type: Teaching
- Affiliated university: Perelman School of Medicine

Services
- Beds: 1200

Helipads
- Helipad: FAA LID: PA03
Number	Length		Surface
Number	ft	m	Surface
H1	35	11	concrete

History
- Founded: 1874

Links
- Website: www.pennmedicine.org/locations/hospital-of-the-university-of-pennsylvania?path=Locations&path=Hospital-of-the-University-of-Pennsylvania
- Lists: Hospitals in Pennsylvania

The Hospital of the University of Pennsylvania (HUP) is the flagship hospital of Penn Medicine and is located in the University City section of West Philadelphia.

== History ==
The hospital was founded at its current location in 1874 by the University of Pennsylvania School of Medicine, making it the oldest university-owned teaching hospital in the country.

The hospital is located on the campus of the University of Pennsylvania, along with several other related organizations including a medical school, a nursing school, veterinary and dental schools, research laboratories and outpatient facilities including the Abramson Cancer Center and the Roberts Proton Therapy Center. The Children's Hospital of Philadelphia (CHOP) is also located on this campus. Although it engages in many collaborative efforts with Penn Medicine, CHOP is not part of the University of Pennsylvania Health System.

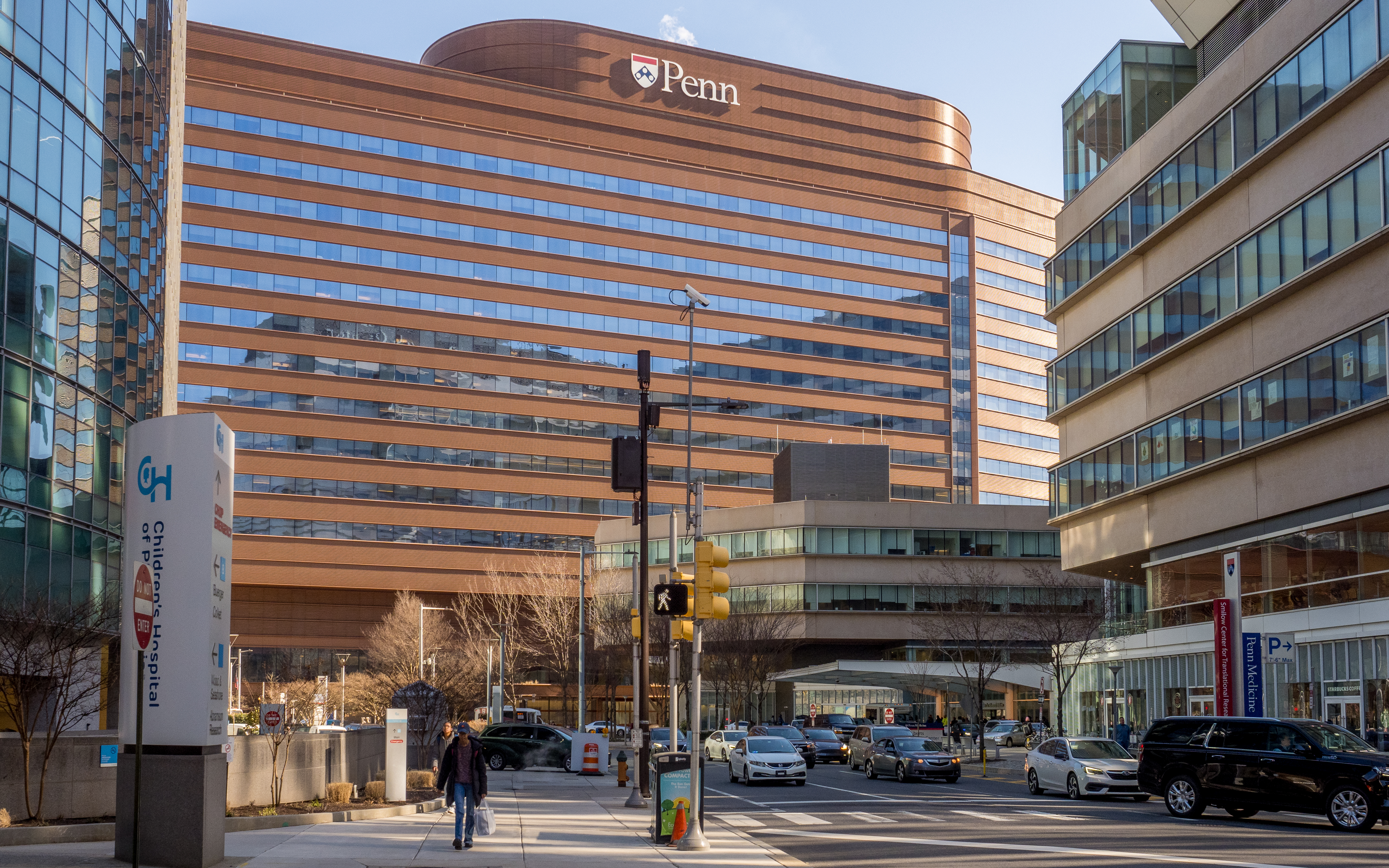
The new "Pavilion"

In 2020, the hospital accelerated the development of its new $1.5 billion "Pavilion" site in order to build additional capacity to combat the COVID-19 crisis.

== Reputation ==
The Hospitals of the University of Pennsylvania-Penn Presbyterian (HUP/PPMC) are ranked among the nation's top hospitals by U.S. News & World Report in 2019. HUP/PPMC is ranked #18 in the nation in the publication's annual "Honor Roll." The Hospitals of the University of Pennsylvania-Penn Presbyterian were nationally ranked for excellence in 12 specialties.

Penn Medicine's hospitals are all recognized as among the best regionally. In the Philadelphia metropolitan area, HUP/PPMC is ranked #1, Pennsylvania Hospital is ranked #4, and Chester County Hospital is ranked #6.

Beyond Philadelphia, Lancaster General Hospital (LGH) is ranked #1 in the Lancaster, Pennsylvania metropolitan area while Princeton Health is ranked #11 in the state of New Jersey.

== Notable births, deaths, and hospitalizations ==
=== Births ===
- Nancy Spungen, girlfriend of punk rock musician Sid Vicious

=== Hospitalizations ===
- Kimmo Timonen, National Hockey League player

=== Deaths ===
- George Rarclay, professional baseball player, St. Louis Cardinals
- Pete Carril, professional and college basketball coach
- Britton Chance, biochemist
- Kathy Change, political activist and writer
- Jim Johnson, professional football defensive coordinator, Phoenix Cardinals, Indianapolis Colts, Philadelphia Eagles, and Seattle Seahawks
- Gary Papa, Philadelphia television sportscaster
- David Ruffin, vocalist, The Temptations
- Andy Smith, college football coach
- Piers Wedgwood, 4th Baron of Wedgwood

== See also ==
- Penn Presbyterian Medical Center ("Presby") - A separate hospital, located nearby, that is part of the Penn Health System.
- Pennsylvania Hospital ("Pennsy") - A separate hospital, on a different campus, that is also part of the Penn Health System. Founded in 1751, it is billed as "America's first hospital."
