= Perelman School of Medicine =

Medical school in Philadelphia, Pennsylvania, US

Perelman School of Medicine at the University of Pennsylvania
- Other name: Penn Med
- Type: Private medical school
- Established: 1765
- Parent institution: University of Pennsylvania
- Affiliations: University of Pennsylvania Health System
- Dean: Jonathan A. Epstein (interim)
- Academic staff: 2,100 (full-time); 1,200 (residents and fellows)
- Administrative staff: 3,334
- Students: 775 M.D. students 594 Ph.D. students 186 M.D.-Ph.D. students 329 masters students 704 post-doctoral fellows
- Location: Philadelphia, Pennsylvania, U.S. 39°56′52″N 75°11′33″W
- Campus: Urban
- Website: med.upenn.edu

The Perelman School of Medicine, previously the University of Pennsylvania School of Medicine (Penn Med), is the medical school of the University of Pennsylvania, a private Ivy league research university in Philadelphia. Founded in 1765, it is the oldest medical school in the United States.

As of 2024, the school has about 2,900 faculty members and nearly $1 billion in annual sponsored program awards.

== History ==
=== 18th century ===
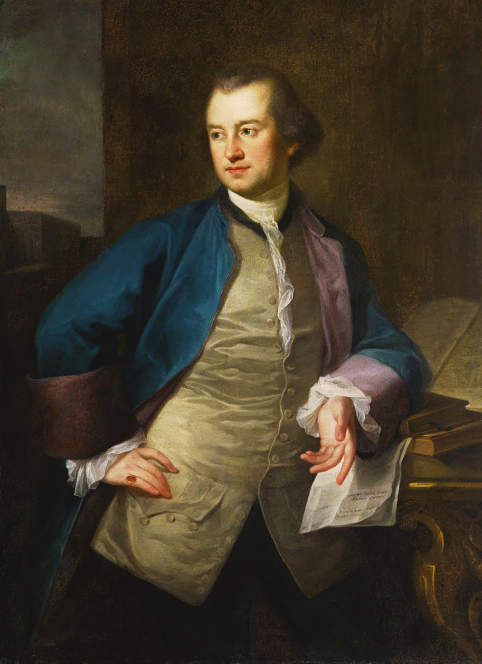
John Morgan, the school's founding professor of Medicine

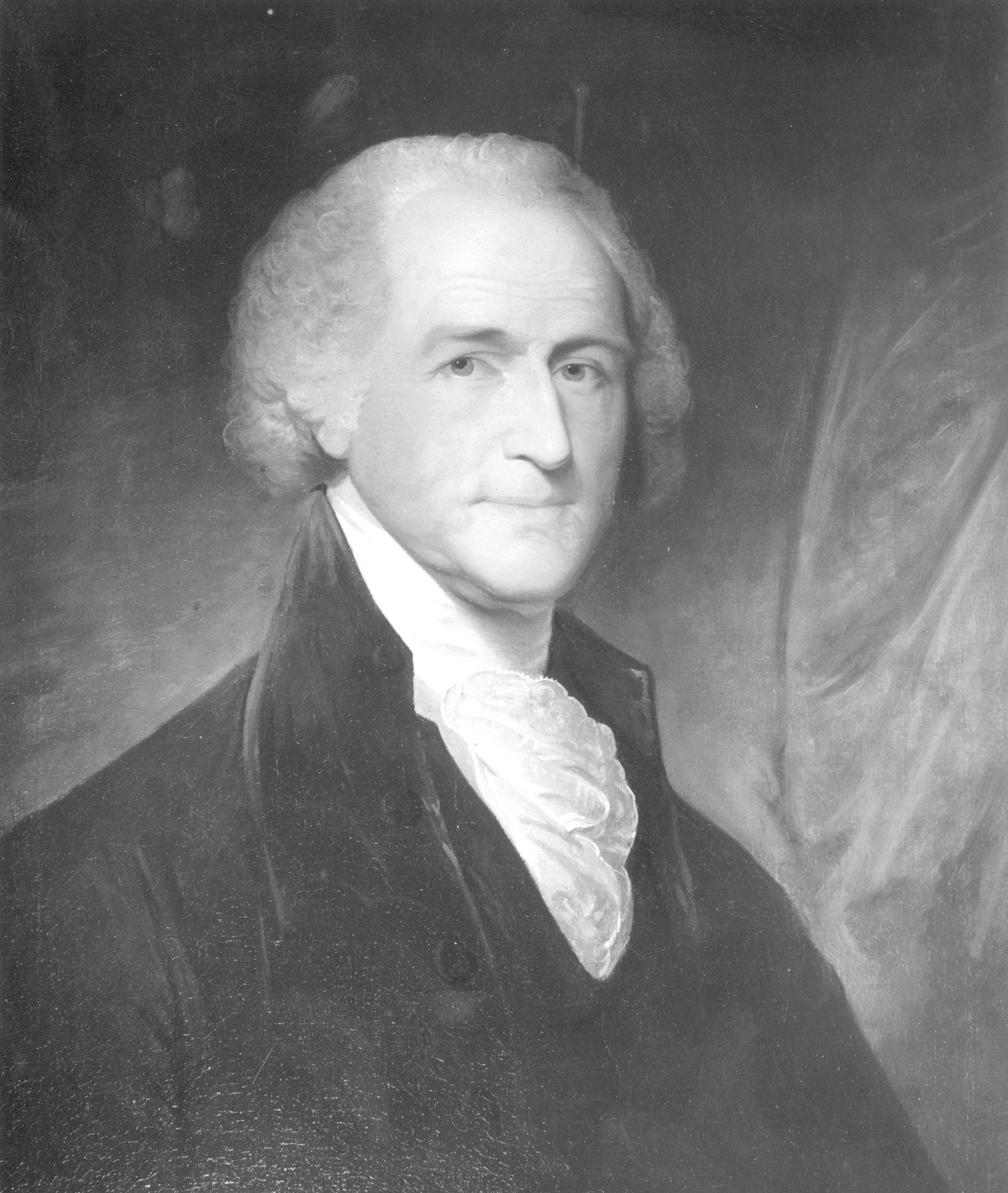
William Shippen Jr., the school's founding professor of Anatomy and Surgery

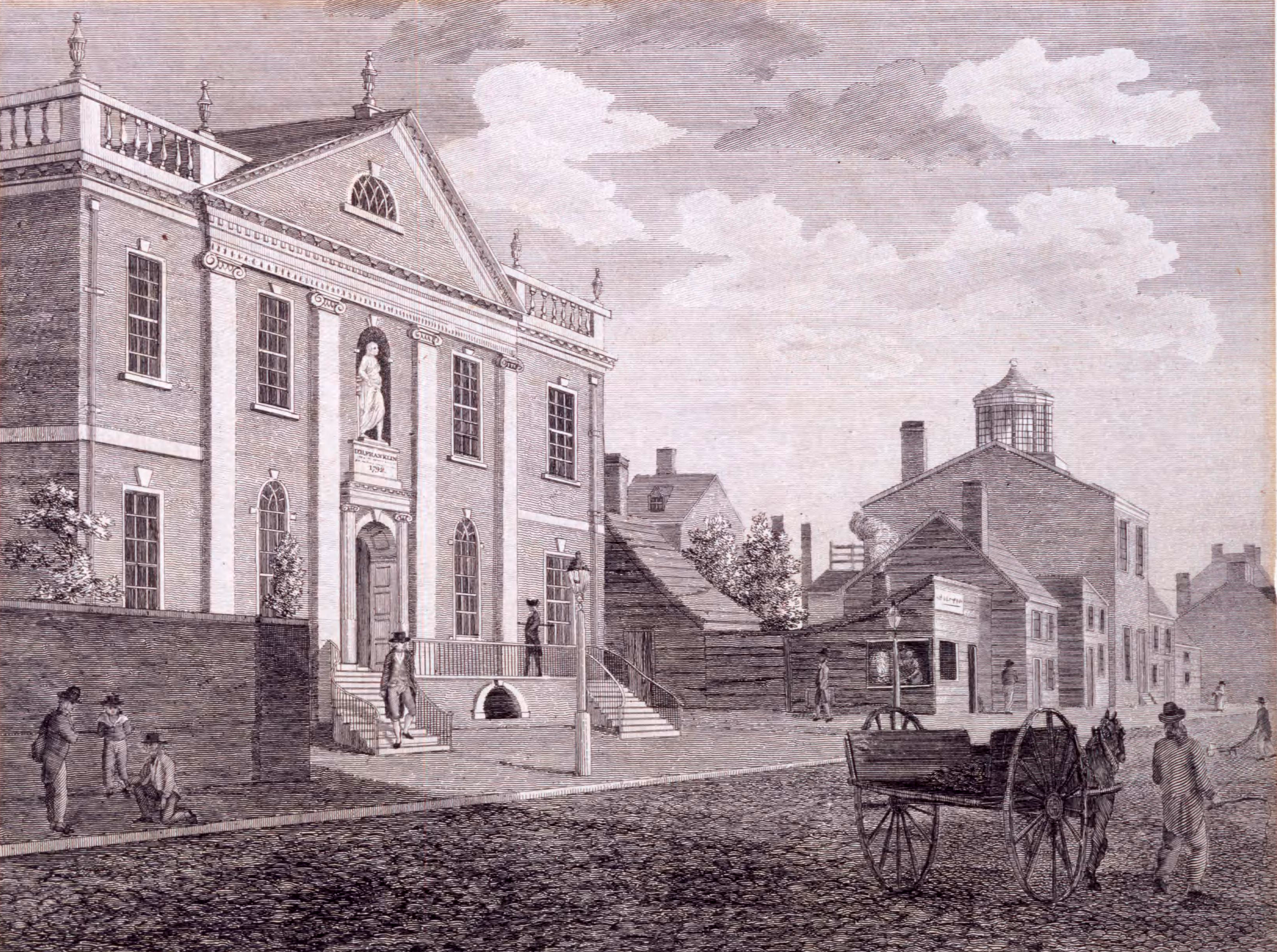
Surgeons Hall at 105 South 5th Street, near present-day Independence Hall, was the site of medical lectures between 1765 and 1801.

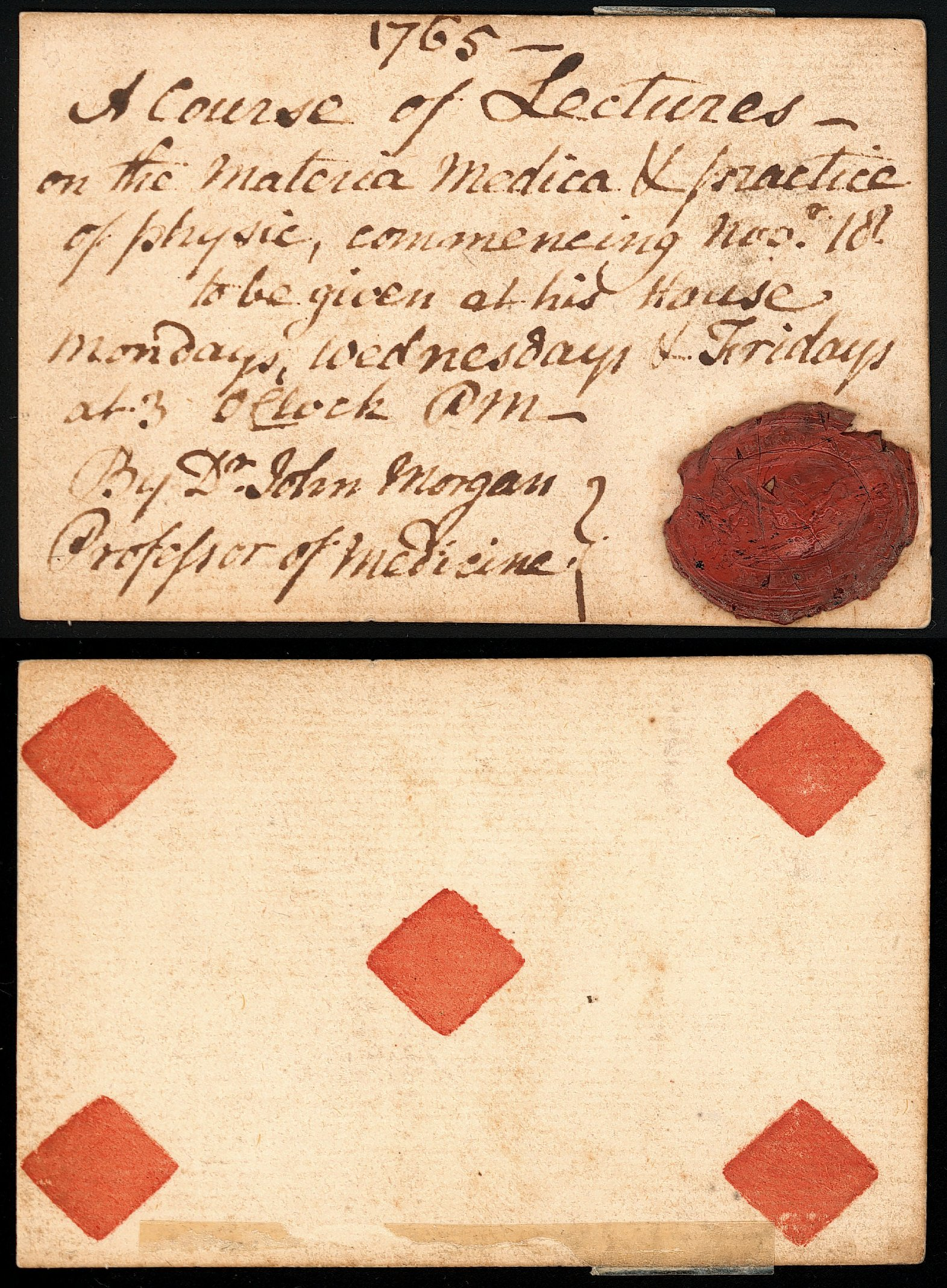
Admission ticket to "A Course of Lectures" given in 1765 by Dr. John Morgan

The founding of a school of medicine was proposed by John Morgan, a graduate of the College of Philadelphia and the University of Edinburgh Medical School. After training in Edinburgh and other European cities, Morgan returned to Philadelphia in 1765. With fellow University of Edinburgh Medical School graduate William Shippen Jr., Morgan persuaded the college's trustees to found the first medical school in the original Thirteen Colonies.

Shortly before the medical school's creation, Morgan delivered an address titled "Upon the Institution of Medical Schools in America," addressed to the trustees and the citizens of Philadelphia, in which he expressed his desire for the new medical school to become a model institution, saying,

Perhaps this medical institution, the first of its kind in America, though small in its beginning, may receive a constant increase of strength, and annually exert new vigor. It may collect a number of young persons of more ordinary abilities, and so improve their knowledge as to spread its reputation to different parts. By sending these abroad duly qualified, or by exciting an emulation amongst men of parts and literature, it may give birth to other useful institutions of a similar nature, or occasional rise, by its example to numerous societies of different kinds, calculated to spread the light of knowledge through the whole American continent, wherever inhabited.

That autumn, students enrolled for "anatomical lectures" and a course on "the theory and practice of physick". Modeling the school after the University of Edinburgh Medical School, medical lectures were supplemented with bedside teaching at the Pennsylvania Hospital.

The School of Medicine's early faculty included nationally prominent physicians, surgeons, and scientists such as Benjamin Rush, Philip Syng Physick, William Shippen Jr., and Robert Hare.

In addition to being a Penn professor of chemistry, medical theory, and clinical practice, Dr. Benjamin Rush served as a key figure in the American Revolution as a Founding Father, signatory to the United States Declaration of Independence, and member of the Continental Congress.

=== 19th century ===
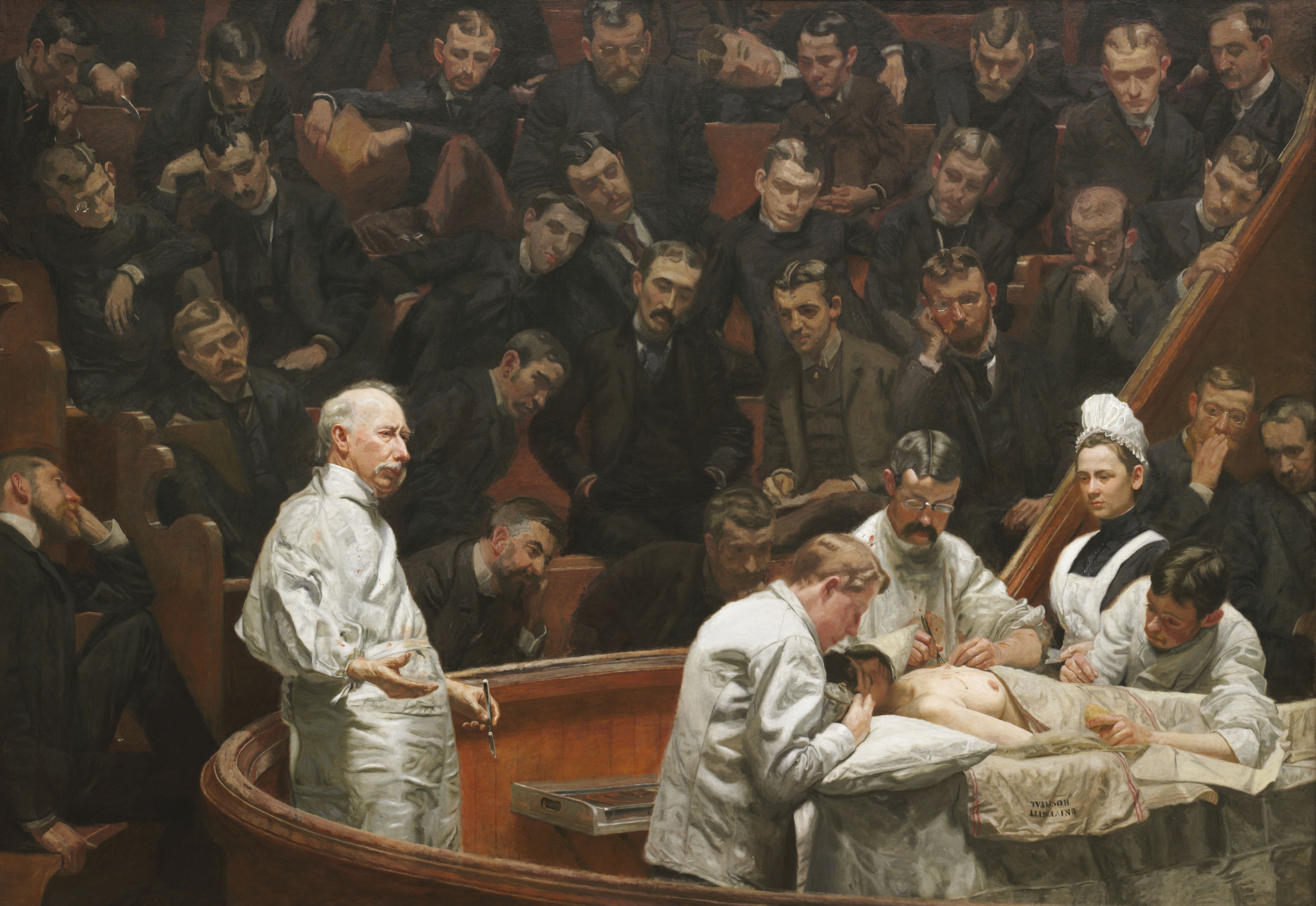
The Agnew Clinic, an 1889 portrait by Thomas Eakins showing a mastectomy being performed in the clinic of Penn surgeon David Hayes Agnew. The painting is notable for showing the increasing specialization of surgical techniques and accessories in the late 19th century.

In the mid-19th century, notable faculty members included William Pepper, Joseph Leidy, and Nathaniel Chapman (founding president of the American Medical Association). William Osler and Howard Atwood Kelly, two of the "founding four" physicians of Johns Hopkins Hospital in Baltimore, were drawn from Penn's medical faculty.

=== 20th century ===
In 1910, the landmark Flexner Report on medical education reviewed Penn as one of the relatively few medical schools of the era with high standards in admission criteria, medical instruction, and research facilities.

=== 21st century ===
In 2011, the University of Pennsylvania School of Medicine was renamed to the Perelman School of Medicine at the University of Pennsylvania in recognition of a $225 million gift by Raymond Perelman and Ruth Perelman. Raymond graduated from the undergraduate program of the Wharton School at the University of Pennsylvania in 1940. The donation was the single largest gift made in the university's history.

== Campus and teaching hospitals ==
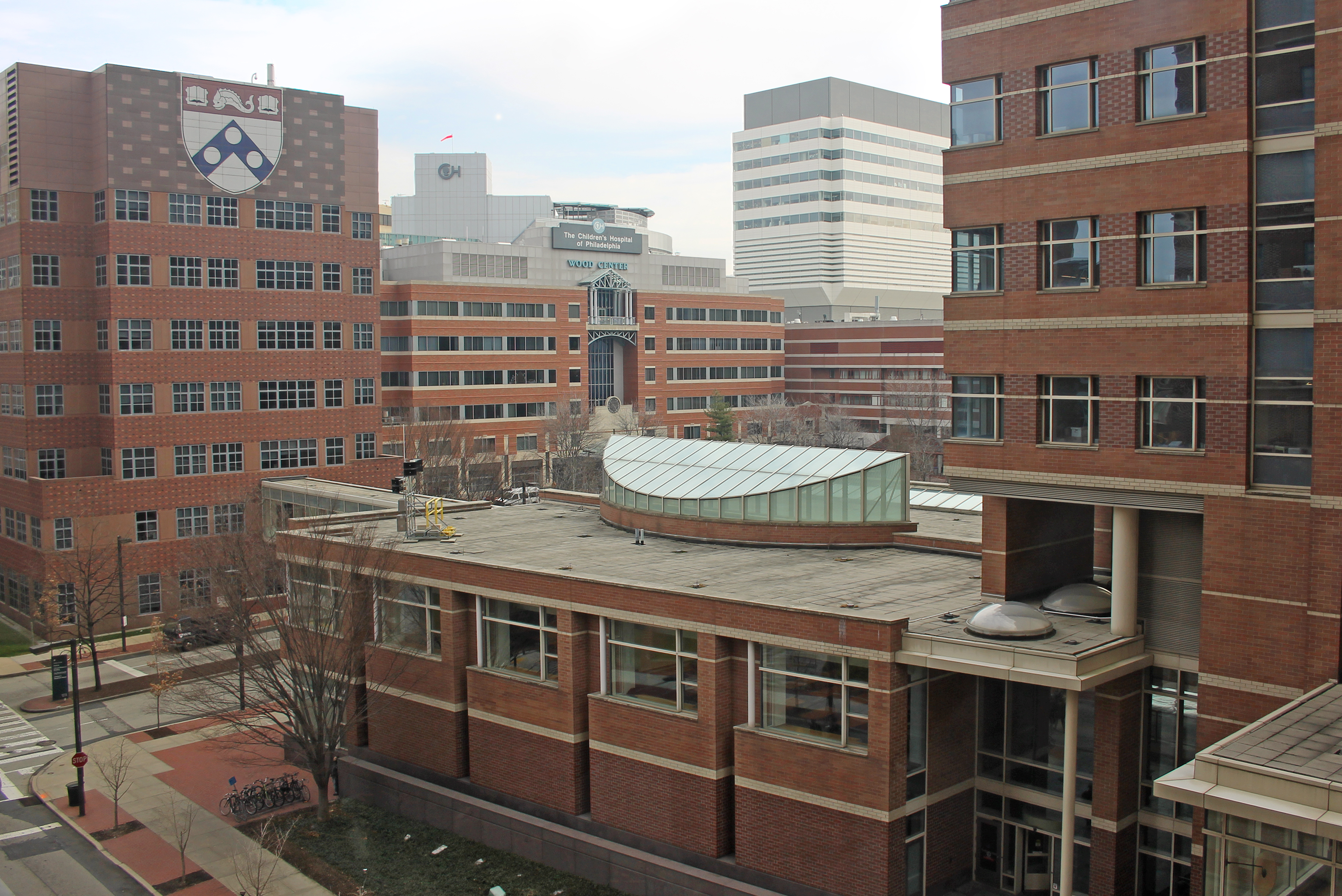
Medical and research facilities of the University of Pennsylvania School of Medicine and the Children's Hospital of Philadelphia

Between 1765 and 1801, medical school lectures were held in Surgeon's Hall on 5th Street in Center City Philadelphia. In 1801, medical instruction moved with the rest of the university to 9th Street. In the 1870s, the university moved across the Schuylkill River to a location in West Philadelphia. As part of this move, the medical faculty persuaded the university trustees to construct a teaching hospital adjacent to the new academic facilities. As a result, Penn's medical school and flagship teaching hospital form part of the university's main campus and are located in close proximity to the university's other schools and departments. Although they are independent institutions, the Children's Hospital of Philadelphia and the Wistar Institute are also located on or adjacent to Penn's campus.

The Hospital of the University of Pennsylvania, Penn Presbyterian Medical Center, Pennsylvania Hospital, and the Children's Hospital of Philadelphia are the medical school's main teaching hospitals. Additional teaching takes place at Chester County Hospital, Doylestown Hospital, Lancaster General Hospital, and the Philadelphia VA Medical Center.

== Medical advancements ==
During the late 19th and early 20th centuries, the School of Medicine was one of the earliest to encourage the development of the emerging medical specialties: neurosurgery, ophthalmology, dermatology, and radiology. Between 1910 and 1939, the chairman of the Department of Pharmacology, Alfred Newton Richards, played a significant role in developing the university as an authority of medical science, helping the U.S. to catch up with European medicine and begin to make significant advances in biomedical science.

In the 1950s and early 1960s, Jonathan Rhoads of the Department of Surgery, which he would later go on to head for many years, mentored Stanley Dudrick who pioneered the successful use of total parenteral nutrition (TPN) for patients unable to tolerate nutrition through their GI tract.

In the 1980s and 1990s, C. William Schwab, a trauma surgeon, led numerous advances in the concept of damage control surgery for severely injured trauma patients.

In the 1990s and 2000s, Paul Offit, a professor of pediatrics at the School of Medicine and Children's Hospital of Philadelphia, lead the scientific advances behind the modern RotaTeq vaccine for infectious childhood diarrhea.

In 2006, Dr. Kaplan and Shore of the Department of Orthopedics discovered the causative mutation in fibrodysplasia ossificans progressiva, an extremely rare disease of bone.

== Medical curriculum ==
Benchmark changes in the understanding of medical science and the practice of medicine have necessitated that the school change its methods of teaching, as well as its curriculum. Large changes were made in 1968, 1970, 1981, 1987, and 1997. The last significant change in 2022 brought about the institution of the IMPaCT curriculum, "an integrated, multidisciplinary curriculum which emphasizes small group instruction, self-directed learning and flexibility." Three themes, Science of Medicine, Technology and Practice of Medicine, and Professionalism and Humanism, were developed by focus groups consisting of department chairpersons, course directors, and students.

== Biomedical Graduate Studies ==
Biomedical Graduate Studies, contained within the Perelman School of Medicine, was established in 1985 and is the academic home within the University of Pennsylvania for roughly 700 students pursuing a PhD in the basic biomedical sciences. BGS consists of more than 600 faculty members across seven Penn schools and several associated institutes including Wistar Institute, Fox Chase Cancer Center, and Children's Hospital of Philadelphia. There are seven graduate programs, labeled by the school as "graduate groups", that lead to a PhD in basic biomedical sciences.

- Biochemistry and molecular biophysics
- Cell and molecular biology
- Epidemiology and biostatistics
- Genomics and computational biology
- Immunology
- Neuroscience
- Pharmacology

All biomedical graduate studies students receive a stipend in addition to a full fellowship and tend to receive the degree within a median time frame of 5.4 years. There is also the option for students to pursue an additional certificate in medicine, public health, and environmental health sciences. Each graduate group has its own admission policy and training mission, and hence curriculum greatly varies.

== Governance ==
The Perelman School of Medicine and the University of Pennsylvania Health System (UPHS) comprise "Penn Medicine". Penn Medicine is an organizational structure designed to integrate Penn's clinical, educational, and research functions. Penn Medicine is governed by a board of trustees which in turn reports to the trustees of the university. Kevin B. Mahoney is CEO of UPHS, while J. Larry Jameson is dean of medicine and executive vice president of the health system.

== Departments ==
The School of Medicine has departments in the following basic science subjects: biochemistry and biophysics, biostatistics and epidemiology, cancer biology, cell and developmental biology, genetics, medical ethics and health policy, microbiology, neuroscience, pharmacology, and physiology. The school also has departments in the following clinical practices: anesthesiology and critical care, dermatology, emergency medicine, family practice and community medicine, medicine, neurology, neurosurgery, obstetrics and gynecology, ophthalmology (see Scheie Eye Institute), orthopaedic surgery, otorhinolaryngology, pathology and laboratory medicine, pediatrics (see Children's Hospital of Philadelphia), physical medicine and rehabilitation, psychiatry, radiation oncology, radiology, and surgery.

=== Centers and institutes ===
The Perelman School of Medicine, in conjunction with the University of Pennsylvania Health System, has contained within it many centers and institutes dealing with clinical medicine, clinical research, basic science research, and translational research.

== Notable alumni ==
Among the noteworthy alumni are four graduates and/or faculty members who were awarded the Nobel Prize, and two alumni who were awarded the Medal of Honor.

== See also ==
- Guatemala Health Initiative, a University of Pennsylvania-affiliated private aid organization, partners with the Perelman School of Medicine
- List of Ivy League medical schools
- Medical schools in Pennsylvania
- University of Edinburgh Medical School
- University of Pennsylvania Health System
