= Lancaster General Hospital =

Lancaster General Health
- University of Pennsylvania Health System

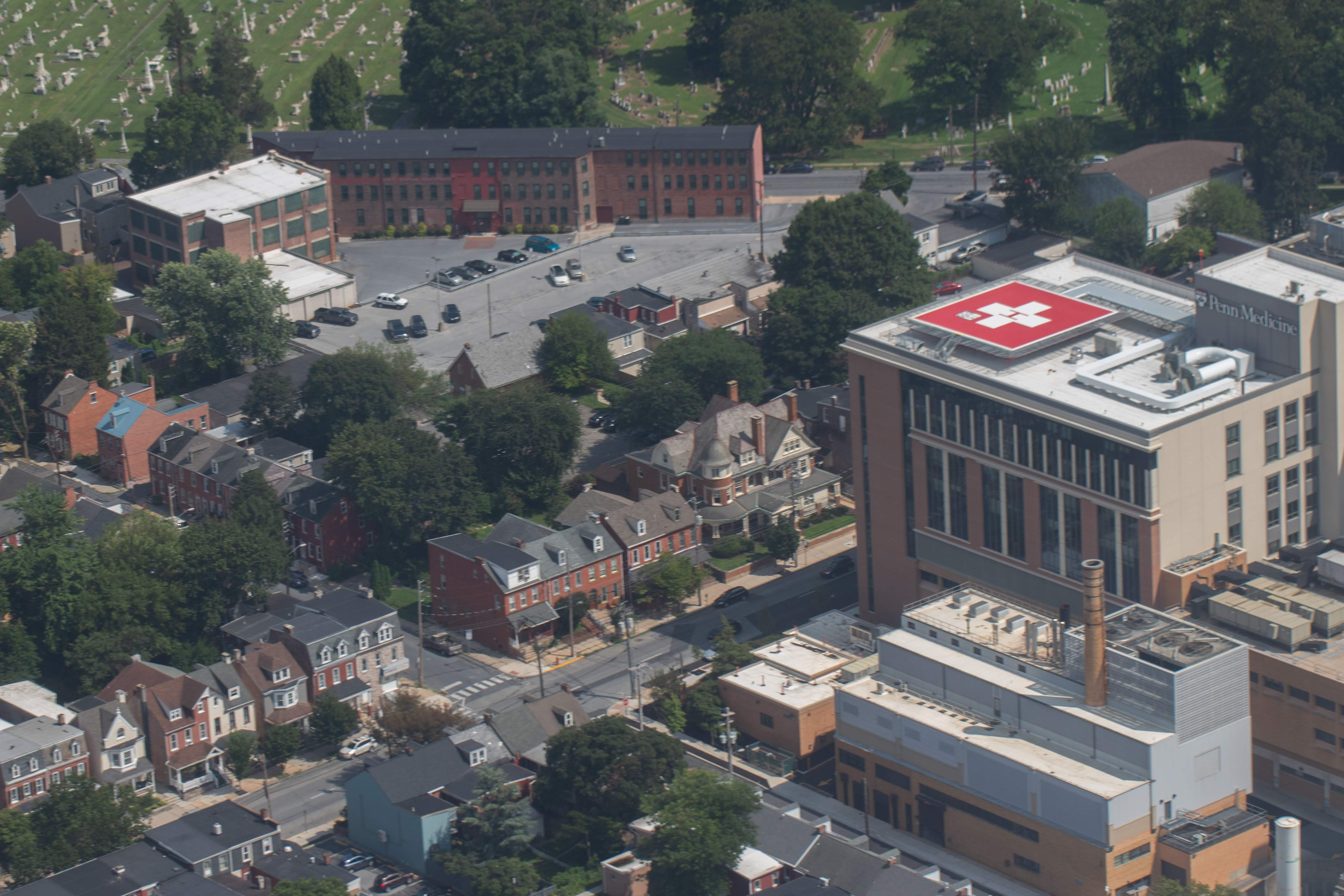
- Lancaster General Hospital in Lancaster, Pennsylvania

Geography
- Location: 555 North Duke Street, Lancaster, Pennsylvania, U.S.
- Coordinates: 40.047°N 76.304°W

Organisation
- Care system: Private
- Type: Teaching
- Affiliated university: Perelman School of Medicine
- Network: University of Pennsylvania Health System

Services
- Beds: 631
- Specialty: Cardiology, oncology, emergency department ,

Helipads
- Helipad: FAA LID: 5PS1
Number	Length		Surface
Number	ft	m	Surface
H1	45	14	Concrete, Elevated

History
- Founded: 1893

Links
- Website: http://www.lancastergeneralhealth.org

Lancaster General Health is a regional hospital located in Lancaster, Pennsylvania. It is part of the University of Pennsylvania Health System. Its flagship hospital is Lancaster General Hospital.

== Background ==
Founded in 1893 in a small home on Queen Street, the hospital is now an approximately 590-bed facility located at 555 N. Duke Street in Lancaster City. The health system encompasses the main acute-care hospital, Lancaster General Hospital, in addition to a specialty hospital for women, Woman & Babies Hospital, as well as joint venture in-patient facilities Lancaster Rehabilitation Hospital and Lancaster Behavioral Health Hospital.

Lancaster General Health also includes a network of physician practices and outpatient centers and urgent care locations throughout Lancaster County as well as York County, Lebanon County, and Chester County.

Lancaster General Health's Lancaster General Hospital gained recognition in December 2020 as a top-tier Level 1 center for trauma care, the first in Lancaster County and one of only 18 in Pennsylvania.

Lancaster General Health offers a wide range of services including cardiology, oncology, neurology, stroke care, acute and trauma care, and pediatric services in partnership with Children's Hospital of Philadelphia. Its first motorized ambulance was gifted by Henry Keiper in May 1916. Although there were many upgrades before and after December 1946, it was around that time the hospital had to expand due to the baby boom post-WWII that drastically increased the number of child births. In January 1991, Lancaster General Health created a program called "ChildProtect Immunization Program" providing free immunizations to minimize future disease.

Lancaster General Health's Lancaster General Hospital consistently receives top grades for safety from independent groups such as Leapfrog. The hospital has been recognized as a Magnet facility for nursing excellence and has received HealthGrades® Distinguished Hospital Award for Patient Safety. Lancaster General Hospital has also been named a "Best Hospital" by U.S. News & World Report for heart surgery, orthopedics, urology, hormonal disorders and ear, nose & throat.

Lancaster General Health uses EPIC as its electronic medical record (EMR) system.

Lancaster General Health is also home to the Lancaster General Health Family Medicine Residency Program, consistently ranked by U.S. News & World Report as one of the top family medicine residency programs in the United States.

== Notable patients ==
=== Deaths ===
- James McKeen Cattell (January 20, 1944), the first psychologist in the United States
