= Chester County Hospital =

Hospital in West Chester, Pennsylvania

- University of Pennsylvania Health System

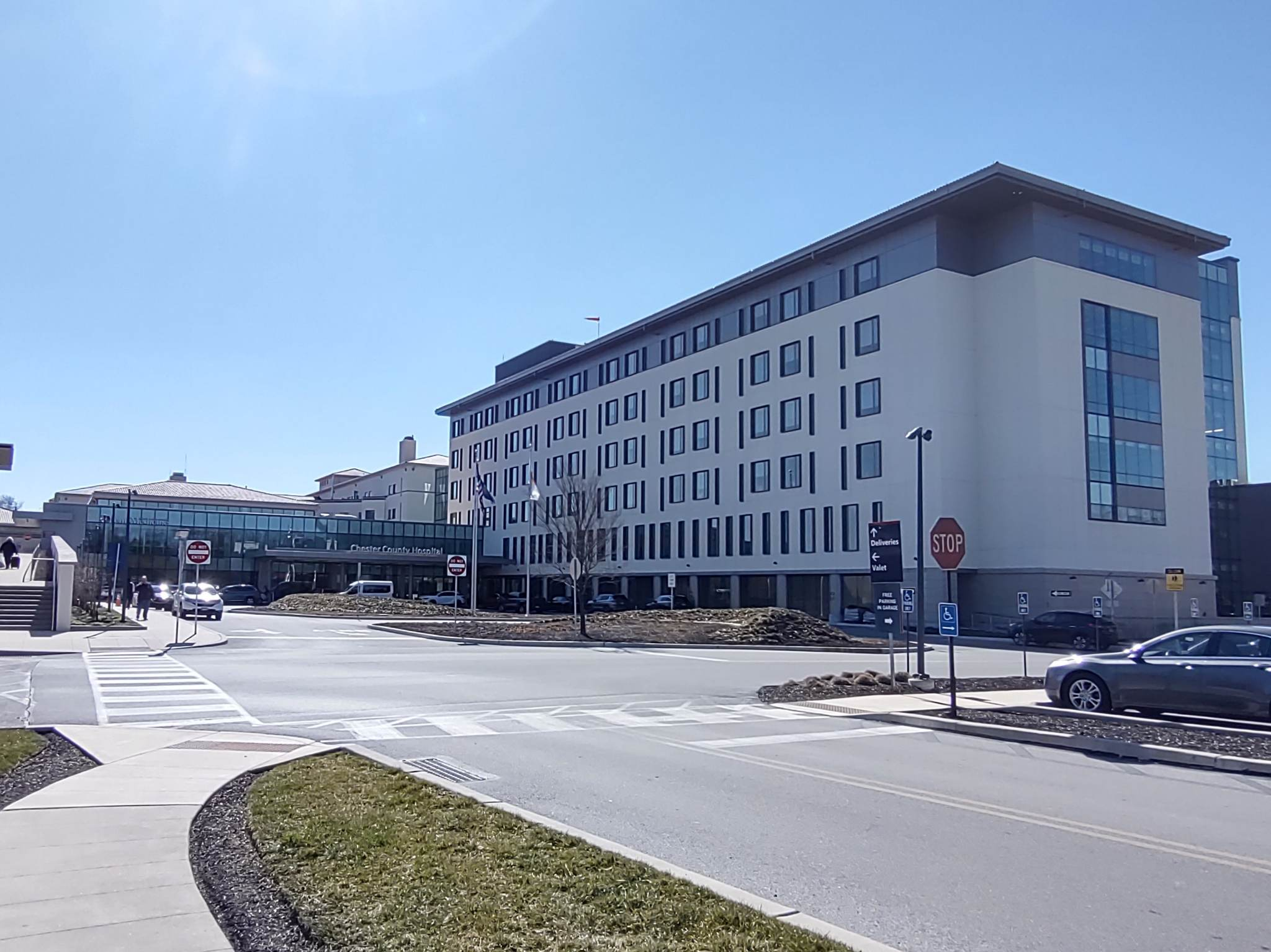

Geography
- Location: 701 East Marshall Street, West Chester, Pennsylvania, Pennsylvania, United States
- Coordinates: 39.9713°N 75.6023°W

Organization
- Care system: Private
- Type: Teaching
- Network: University of Pennsylvania Health System

Services
- Beds: 329

Helipads
- Helipad: FAA LID: 3PS0

History
- Former name: West Chester Hospital
- Opened: 1892

Links
- Website: chestercountyhospital.org
- Lists: Hospitals in Pennsylvania

Chester County Hospital, officially Penn Medicine Chester County Hospital, is a private, non-profit, 329-bed teaching hospital located primarily in West Chester, Pennsylvania. Opened in 1892, the hospital joined University of Pennsylvania Health System in 2013. The hospital's main campus is located in both West Chester and West Goshen Township, with satellite locations located in West Goshen, Jennersville, Exton, New Garden, and Kennett Square. The hospital is affiliated with the Children's Hospital of Philadelphia.

== History ==
The hospital, originally known as West Chester Hospital, began as a 10-bed dispensary. Chartered on September 12, 1892, the full-service hospital opened as Chester County Hospital in March 1893, with construction completed by 1895. The hospital admitted its first patient on March 1, 1893. Chester County's nursing school opened in 1894. The hospital was rebuilt in 1925 to house 145 beds. Built in Italian Renaissance style, the new building was funded by a $1,000,000 donation from Pierre S. du Pont. The gift was in honor of his former associate Lewes A. Mason, who had died in the care of the hospital during the Spanish flu. The hospital's Intensive care unit opened in 1979, and its NICU opened in 1994. The NICU received level III designation in 2005. Chester County Hospital has been expanded in 1931, 1955, 1967, 1979, 1985, 2014, and most recently in 2021–2022.

Chester County Hospital operated independently until it joined the University of Pennsylvania Health System in 2013.

The Fern Hill Medical Campus, located in West Goshen, opened in 2000, and Penn Medicine Southern Chester County, located in Jennersville, opened in 2015.

The hospital celebrated its 125th anniversary in 2017.

Chester County Day, an annual event focusing on tours of local historic homes, is organized by and raises money for the hospital.

In 2021, Chester County Hospital was ranked as the 85th best hospital in the nation & 5th in the state by Newsweek.
