= Penn Presbyterian Medical Center =

- University of Pennsylvania Health System

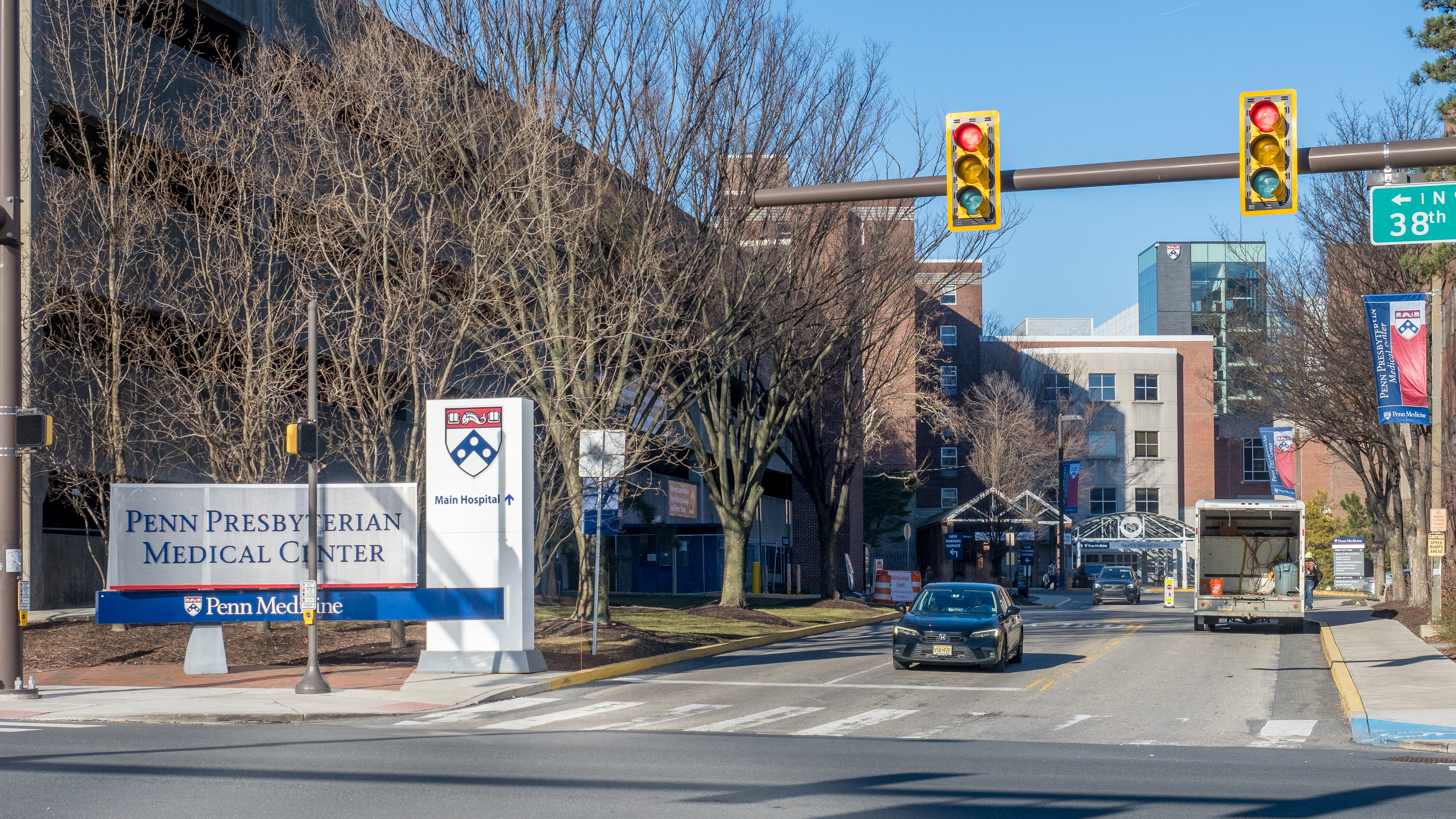

Geography
- Location: 51 North 39th Street, Philadelphia, Pennsylvania, U.S.
- Coordinates: 39°57′30″N 75°11′57″W

Organisation
- Care system: Private
- Type: Teaching
- Affiliated university: Perelman School of Medicine
- Network: University of Pennsylvania Health System

Services
- Emergency department: Level I Trauma Center
- Speciality: Pulmonology, ophthalmology, musculoskeletal

Helipads
- Helipad: FAA LID: PA39
Number	Length		Surface
Number	ft	m	Surface
H1	65	20	Roof/Top

History
- Founded: 1871

Links
- Website: pennmedicine.org/presby

Penn Presbyterian Medical Center, sometimes called Presby, is a hospital located in the University City section of West Philadelphia. It was founded by Reverend Ephraim D. Saunders in 1871 and formally joined the University of Pennsylvania Health System in 1995. Penn Presbyterian is spread out on a campus bounded by Market Street, Powelton Avenue, 38th Street, and Sloan Street.

== History ==
Presbyterian was founded in 1871 by the Alliance of Philadelphia Presbyteries as a 45-bed facility on 2.5 acres (1.0 ha). The Reverend Dr. Ephraim D. Saunders, a Presbyterian minister, dedicated the land in memory of his son Courtland, who was shot and killed in service on September 21, 1862, in a battle during the Civil War. Reverend Saunders said at the dedication, "A few days before the battle of Antietam... he [Courtland] passed with me from his tent in the forest... In view of the perils of war... he recommended that in the case of his death... the property should all be donated to some prominent... charity." The incorporators declared the purpose was "to provide medical and surgical aid and nursing for the sick and disabled..." Care and nursing was granted to the indigent of Philadelphia, funded by donations from individuals and Presbyterian churches, to fulfill its Christian mission. This commitment was renewed in 1952, when the trustees of the Hospital voted against moving to the more affluent suburbs, choosing to remain in West Philadelphia. The original name was "Presbyterian Hospital of Philadelphia." It has since grown into a 300-bed institution on 16.5 acres (6.7 ha) with various nationally recognized medical institutes, specialty centers and research programs.

Presbyterian's School of Nursing, founded in 1887, has a long history of emphasizing the importance of nursing in patient care at the medical center . As a result, nurses at Presbyterian are recognized by the medical center for improving the quality of care it strives to provide.

The Hospital remained independent but formally affiliated with Penn in 1965, changing its name to Presbyterian–University of Pennsylvania Medical Center. It was renamed the Presbyterian Medical Center of Philadelphia in 1989.

By the mid-1990s, senior management at Presbyterian Hospital realized due to increasing costs and shrinking revenues, an independent hospital the size of Presbyterian might not survive. In 1995, Presbyterian Medical Center, as it was then known, joined the University of Pennsylvania Health System (UPHS). This has provided them access to and benefits from the resources of the health system, as well as the university's School of Medicine. The name was changed to Penn Presbyterian Medical Center.

== Specialties ==
=== Pulmonary care ===
The Philadelphia Heart Institute was the region's first outpatient pulmonary care facility. The Scheie Eye Institute (ranked #17 in ophthalmology by U.S. News & World Report) has received national attention for expertise and service. Presbyterian is also the primary location of Penn Orthopaedics (ranked #13 by U.S. News & World Report). It is the designated Level 1 trauma center for Penn Medicine and the University of Pennsylvania, which was located at the Hospital of the University of Pennsylvania until 2014.

=== Ophthalmology ===
The Scheie Eye Institute is the department of ophthalmology of the Perelman School of Medicine at the University of Pennsylvania. It is located within the Penn Presbyterian Medical Center and is a leading center for research and treatment of disorders of the eye. In 2007, Scheie was the leading recipient of funding from the National Eye Institute (NEI), part of the NIH. In 2006, Scheie was the NEI's #2 recipient.

The institute is named after Harold G. Scheie, M.D., the medical school's first resident in ophthalmology who later became the head of the department. As department head he pioneered many new treatments and contributed significantly to the literature. After years of fundraising by Scheie, a new 72 bed, 6 story facility was opened in 1972.

=== Musculoskeletal care ===
Penn Medicine University City, located on the hospital's campus at 3737 Market Street, is an affiliated outpatient facility and advanced treatment center specializing in musculoskeletal care.

== See also ==
- Hospital of the University of Pennsylvania ("HUP") - A separate hospital, also located in University City on the main campus of the University of Pennsylvania
- Pennsylvania Hospital ("Pennsy") - A separate hospital, on a different campus, that is also part of the Penn Health System. Founded in 1751, it is billed as "America's first hospital."
