= Doylestown Township, Pennsylvania =

Township in Pennsylvania, US

- Township
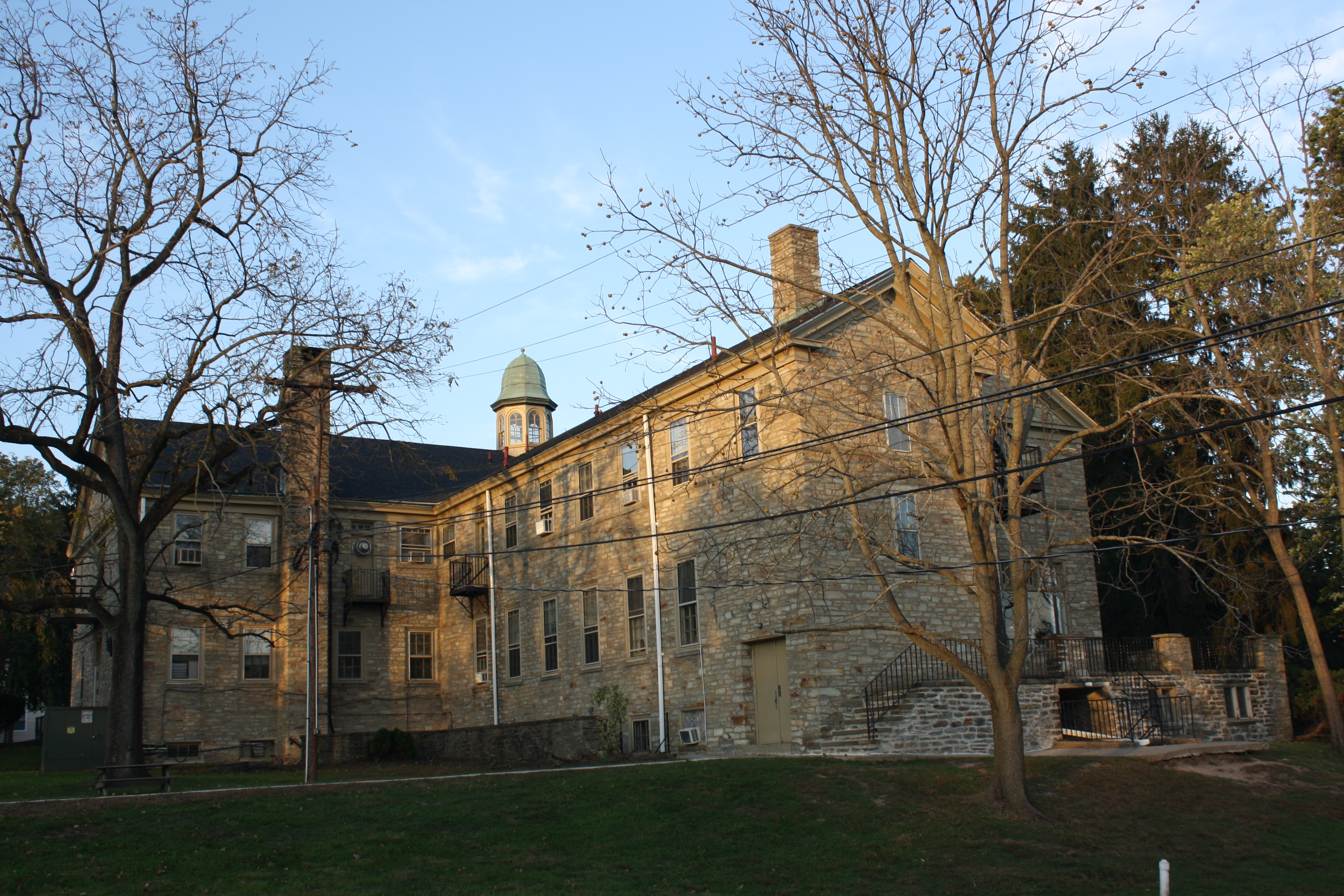
- Tabor Home for Needy and Destitute Children

- Flag Seal
- Motto: "A Township with a sense of place"
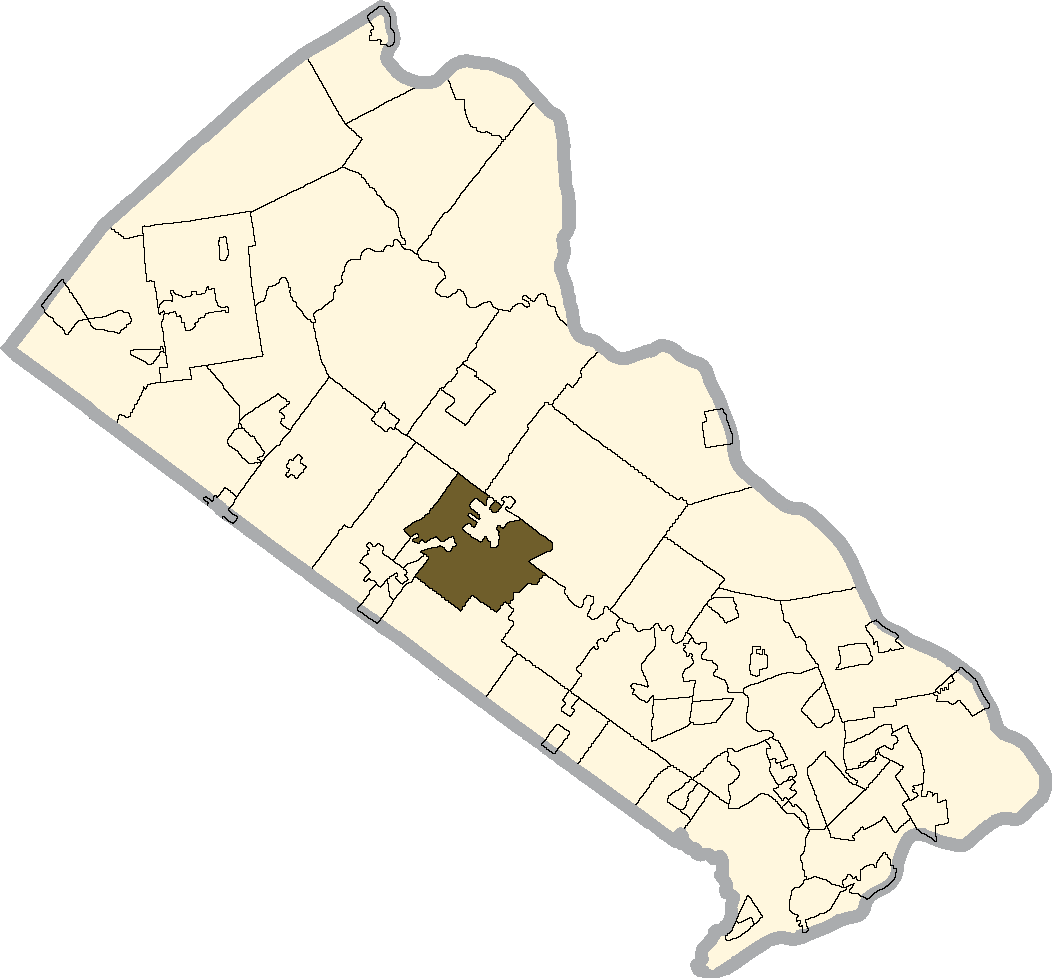
- Location of Doylestown Township in Bucks County

- Location in Pennsylvania and the United States Doylestown Township (the United States)
- Coordinates: 40.3129°N 75.1270°W
- Country: United States
- State: Pennsylvania
- County: Bucks
- Founded: 1818

Area
  - Total: 15.63 sq mi (40.5 km^{2})
  - Land: 15.44 sq mi (40.0 km^{2})
  - Water: 0.19 sq mi (0.49 km^{2})
- Elevation: 299 ft (91 m)

Population (2020)
  - Total: 17,971
  - Density: 1,164/sq mi (449.4/km^{2})
- Time zone: UTC-5 (EST)
  - Summer (DST): UTC-4 (EDT)
- Area codes: 215, 267 and 445
- FIPS code: 42-017-19792
- Website: www.doylestownpa.org

Doylestown Township is a township in Bucks County, Pennsylvania, United States. The population was 17,971 at the 2020 census. Adjacent to the county seat, the township hosts many county offices and the county correctional facility. Doylestown Central Park is a park in the township.

== History ==
Doylestown includes a number of villages which were formerly independent communities, including Bennetts Corner, Castle Valley, Cross Keys, Dyerstown, Edison, Fountainville, Furlong, Greers Corner, Paul Valley, Tradesville, The Turk, and Vauxtown. Fordhook Farm and Tabor Home for Needy and Destitute Children were listed on the National Register of Historic Places in 1987. It was also the location of the formerly listed Fretz Farm.

== Geography ==
According to the U.S. Census Bureau, the township has a total area of 15.6 square miles (40 km^{2}), of which, 15.4 square miles (40 km^{2}) of it is land and 0.2 square miles (0.52 km^{2}) of it (1.20%) is water. It is drained by the Neshaminy Creek into the Delaware River.

Natural features include Almshouse Hill, Featherbed Hill, Flatiron Hill, Fretz Valley, Iron Hill, Little Buckingham Mountain, Mill Creek, Neshaminy Creek, Pebble Hill, and Pine Run.

=== Neighboring municipalities ===
- Warwick Township (southeast)
- Warrington Township (south)
- New Britain (west)
- New Britain Township (northwest)
- Plumstead Township (north)
- Doylestown (north)
- Buckingham Township (northeast)

== Demographics ==
Historical population
Census	Pop.	Note	%±
1930	1,371		—
1940	1,471		7.3%
1950	2,364		60.7%
1960	3,795		60.5%
1970	6,613		74.3%
1980	11,824		78.8%
1990	14,510		22.7%
2000	17,619		21.4%
2010	17,565		−0.3%
2020	17,971		2.3%

As of the 2010 census, the township was 92.4% White, 1.3% Black or African American, 0.1% Native American, 1.9% Asian, 0.1% Native Hawaiian or other Pacific Islander, and 1.5% were two or more races. 2.8% of the population were of Hispanic or Latino ancestry.

As of the census of 2000, there were 17,619 people, 5,999 households, and 4,445 families residing in the township. The population density was 1,136.7 inhabitants per square mile (438.9/km^{2}). There were 6,200 housing units at an average density of 400.0 per square mile (154.4/km^{2}). The racial makeup of the township was 95.22% White, 2.59% African American, 0.06% Native American, 1.25% Asian, 0.02% Pacific Islander, 0.20% from other races, and 0.64% from two or more races. Hispanic or Latino of any race were 1.40% of the population.

There were 5,999 households, out of which 35.1% had children under the age of 18 living with them, 66.7% were married couples living together, 5.6% had a female householder with no husband present, and 25.9% were non-families. 22.0% of all households were made up of individuals, and 11.7% had someone living alone who was 65 years of age or older. The average household size was 2.63 and the average family size was 3.11.

In the township the population was spread out, with 23.7% under the age of 18, 5.4% from 18 to 24, 27.2% from 25 to 44, 25.7% from 45 to 64, and 18.0% who were 65 years of age or older. The median age was 42 years. For every 100 females there were 96.7 males. For every 100 females age 18 and over, there were 94.1 males.

The median income for a household in the township was $81,226, and the median income for a family was $93,984. Males had a median income of $62,853 versus $36,180 for females. The per capita income for the township was $38,031. About 1.6% of families and 3.7% of the population were below the poverty line, including 2.6% of those under age 18 and 4.8% of those age 65 or over.

== Climate ==
According to the Köppen climate classification system, Doylestown Twp has a Hot-summer, Humid continental climate (Dfa). Dfa climates are characterized by at least one month having an average mean temperature ≤ 32.0 °F (0.0 °C), at least four months with an average mean temperature ≥ 50.0 °F (10.0 °C), at least one month with an average mean temperature ≥ 71.6 °F (22.0 °C) and no significant precipitation difference between seasons. Although most summer days are slightly humid in Doylestown Twp, episodes of heat and high humidity can occur with heat index values > 106 °F (41 °C). Since 1981, the highest air temperature was 103.0 °F (39.4 °C) on 07/22/2011, and the highest daily average mean dew point was 75.3 °F (24.1 °C) on 08/12/2016. The average wettest month is July which corresponds with the annual peak in thunderstorm activity. Since 1981, the wettest calendar day was 7.23 inches (184 mm) on 09/16/1999. During the winter months, the average annual extreme minimum air temperature is −0.7 °F (−18.2 °C). Since 1981, the coldest air temperature was −11.8 °F (−24.3 °C) on 01/22/1984. Episodes of extreme cold and wind can occur with wind chill values < −11 °F (−24 °C). The average annual snowfall (Nov-Apr) is between 30 inches (76 cm) and 36 inches (91 cm). Ice storms and large snowstorms depositing ≥ 12 inches (30 cm) of snow occur once every few years, particularly during nor’easters from December through February.

Climate data for Doylestown Twp, Elevation 272 ft (83 m), 1981-2010 normals, extremes 1981-2018
Month	Jan	Feb	Mar	Apr	May	Jun	Jul	Aug	Sep	Oct	Nov	Dec	Year
Record high °F (°C)	70.9 (21.6)	77.8 (25.4)	87.1 (30.6)	93.9 (34.4)	94.6 (34.8)	95.8 (35.4)	103.0 (39.4)	99.4 (37.4)	97.4 (36.3)	89.4 (31.9)	80.8 (27.1)	75.2 (24.0)	103.0 (39.4)
Mean daily maximum °F (°C)	39.1 (3.9)	42.4 (5.8)	50.8 (10.4)	62.7 (17.1)	72.7 (22.6)	81.5 (27.5)	85.6 (29.8)	84.0 (28.9)	77.1 (25.1)	65.7 (18.7)	54.7 (12.6)	43.3 (6.3)	63.4 (17.4)
Daily mean °F (°C)	30.5 (−0.8)	33.3 (0.7)	40.9 (4.9)	51.6 (10.9)	61.3 (16.3)	70.5 (21.4)	75.1 (23.9)	73.5 (23.1)	66.2 (19.0)	54.5 (12.5)	44.8 (7.1)	34.9 (1.6)	53.2 (11.8)
Mean daily minimum °F (°C)	21.9 (−5.6)	24.1 (−4.4)	30.9 (−0.6)	40.4 (4.7)	49.8 (9.9)	59.6 (15.3)	64.6 (18.1)	63.1 (17.3)	55.4 (13.0)	43.3 (6.3)	34.9 (1.6)	26.5 (−3.1)	43.0 (6.1)
Record low °F (°C)	−11.8 (−24.3)	−4.2 (−20.1)	2.5 (−16.4)	16.8 (−8.4)	33.4 (0.8)	40.9 (4.9)	47.4 (8.6)	42.1 (5.6)	34.9 (1.6)	23.5 (−4.7)	11.2 (−11.6)	−2.4 (−19.1)	−11.8 (−24.3)
Average precipitation inches (mm)	3.24 (82)	2.62 (67)	3.73 (95)	3.91 (99)	4.34 (110)	4.30 (109)	5.01 (127)	4.06 (103)	4.44 (113)	4.17 (106)	3.63 (92)	3.90 (99)	47.35 (1,203)
Average relative humidity (%)	66.6	63.4	58.8	58.0	62.3	67.4	67.2	70.0	71.5	70.0	68.9	68.8	66.1
Average dew point °F (°C)	20.7 (−6.3)	22.2 (−5.4)	27.6 (−2.4)	37.3 (2.9)	48.3 (9.1)	59.2 (15.1)	63.5 (17.5)	63.1 (17.3)	56.7 (13.7)	44.9 (7.2)	35.2 (1.8)	25.7 (−3.5)	42.1 (5.6)
Source: PRISM

== Ecology ==
According to the A. W. Kuchler U.S. potential natural vegetation types, Doylestown Twp would have a dominant vegetation type of Appalachian Oak (104) with a dominant vegetation form of Eastern Hardwood Forest (25). The plant hardiness zone is 6b with an average annual extreme minimum air temperature of −0.7 °F (−18.2 °C). The spring bloom typically begins by April 11 and fall color usually peaks by October 30.

== Transportation ==
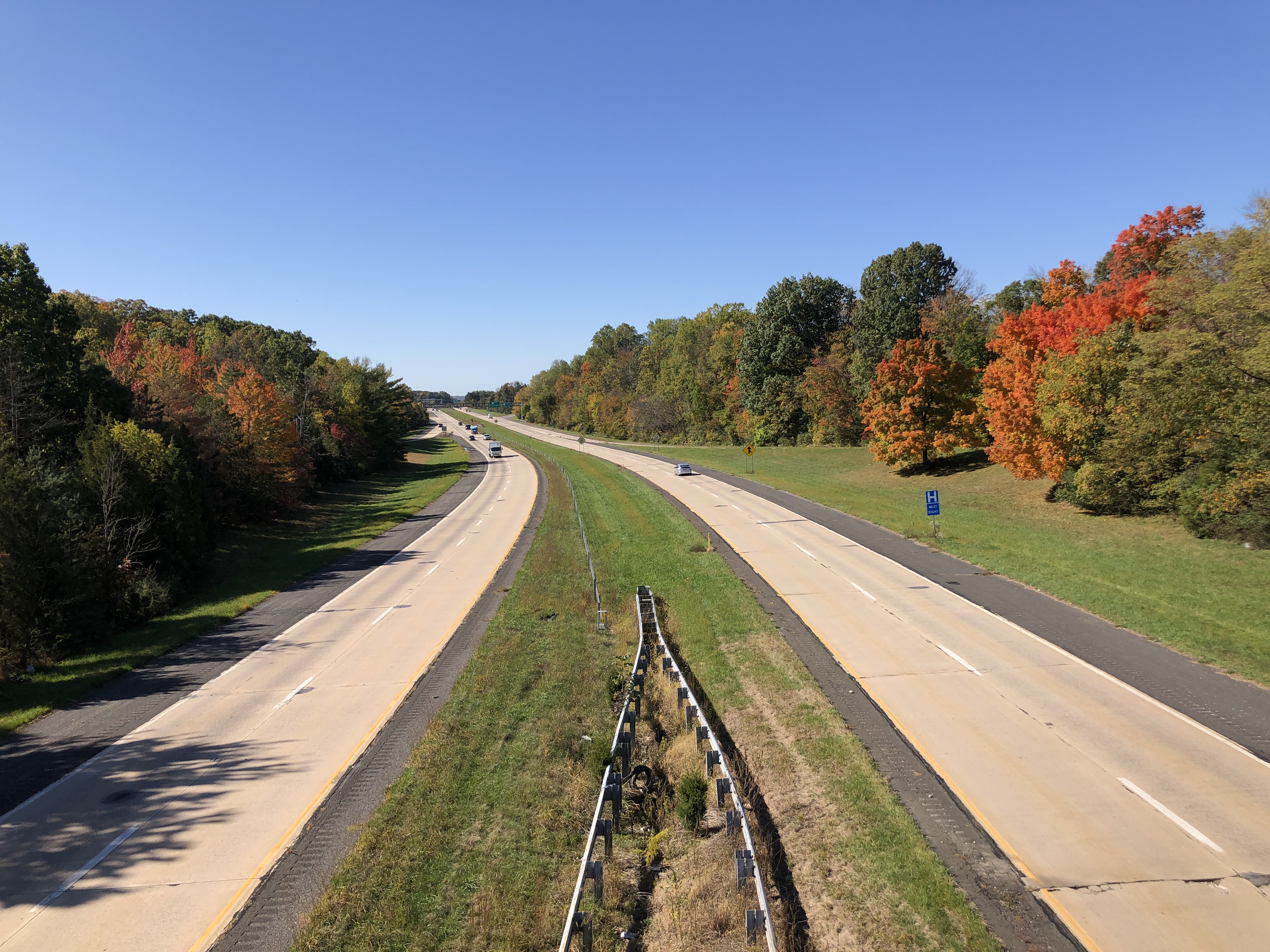
US 202 southbound in Doylestown Township

As of 2018 there were 110.42 miles (177.70 km) of public roads in Doylestown Township, of which 32.96 miles (53.04 km) were maintained by the Pennsylvania Department of Transportation (PennDOT) and 77.46 miles (124.66 km) were maintained by the township.

Major roads in Doylestown Township include U.S. Route 202, which runs southwest–northeast through the township along a two-lane expressway-grade parkway before becoming a four-lane freeway that bypasses Doylestown to the south; Pennsylvania Route 611, which runs north–south along Easton Road before becoming a four-lane freeway that bypasses Doylestown to the west, U.S. Route 202 Business, which runs along State Street from New Britain east to an interchange with the PA 611 freeway, where State Street continues into Doylestown; Pennsylvania Route 263, which runs north–south along York Road along the eastern border of the township; Pennsylvania Route 313, which runs northwest–southeast along Swamp Road on the northeastern border of the township; Almshouse Road, which runs east–west through the southern portion of the township; and Lower State Road, which runs southwest–northeast through the township and heads into Doylestown.

SEPTA provides bus service to Doylestown Township along the SEPTA City Bus Route 55 line, which follows Pennsylvania Route 611 and Easton Road through the township, heading north to Doylestown and south to Willow Grove and Olney Transportation Center in North Philadelphia. SEPTA Regional Rail's Lansdale/Doylestown Line stops at the Delaware Valley University station in Doylestown Township along its route between Doylestown and Center City Philadelphia. Bucks County Transport operates the Doylestown DART bus which serves points of interest in the township and provides service into Doylestown. The Doylestown DART connects at Delaware Valley University with the DART West bus, which runs to New Britain and Chalfont, and connects at Doylestown Point Shopping Center with the DART South bus, which runs to Warrington.

== Education ==
The township is in the Central Bucks School District.

The majority of Delaware Valley University is in the township.

== Landmarks ==
Fonthill is in the township.

Moravian Pottery and Tile Works is in the township.

== Notable residents ==
- Władysław Bortnowski, high-ranking Polish general during World War II
- Clarence Buckman, U.S. and State Representative in Minnesota
- William Godshalk, U.S. Representative
- Anthony Green, singer-songwriter (Circa Survive, Saosin)
- Annie Haslam, singer-songwriter (Renaissance)
- Irene Molloy, singer and actress
- Alecia Moore (Pink), singer
- Jon Simmons, singer-songwriter (Balance and Composure)
