= Bennetts Corner =

Bennetts Corner may refer to

- Bennetts Corner, Pennsylvania
- Bennetts Corners, New York
- Bennetts Corners, Ohio
