= Tabor House =

Tabor House may refer to:

in Israel

- Tabor House (Jerusalem)

in the United States

- Tabor House (Leadville, Colorado), in National Historic Landmark Leadville Historic District
- Pratt-Tabor House, Red Wing, MN, listed on the NRHP in Minnesota
- Dr. Joseph A. Tabor House, Pascagoula, MS, listed on the NRHP in Mississippi
- Tabor-Wing House, Dover Plains, NY, listed on the NRHP in New York
- Tabor House (Checotah, Oklahoma), listed on the NRHP in Oklahoma
- Tabor Home for Needy and Destitute Children, Doylestown, PA, listed on the NRHP in Pennsylvania
