= US 202 Parkway Trail =

Multi-use trail in Pennsylvania

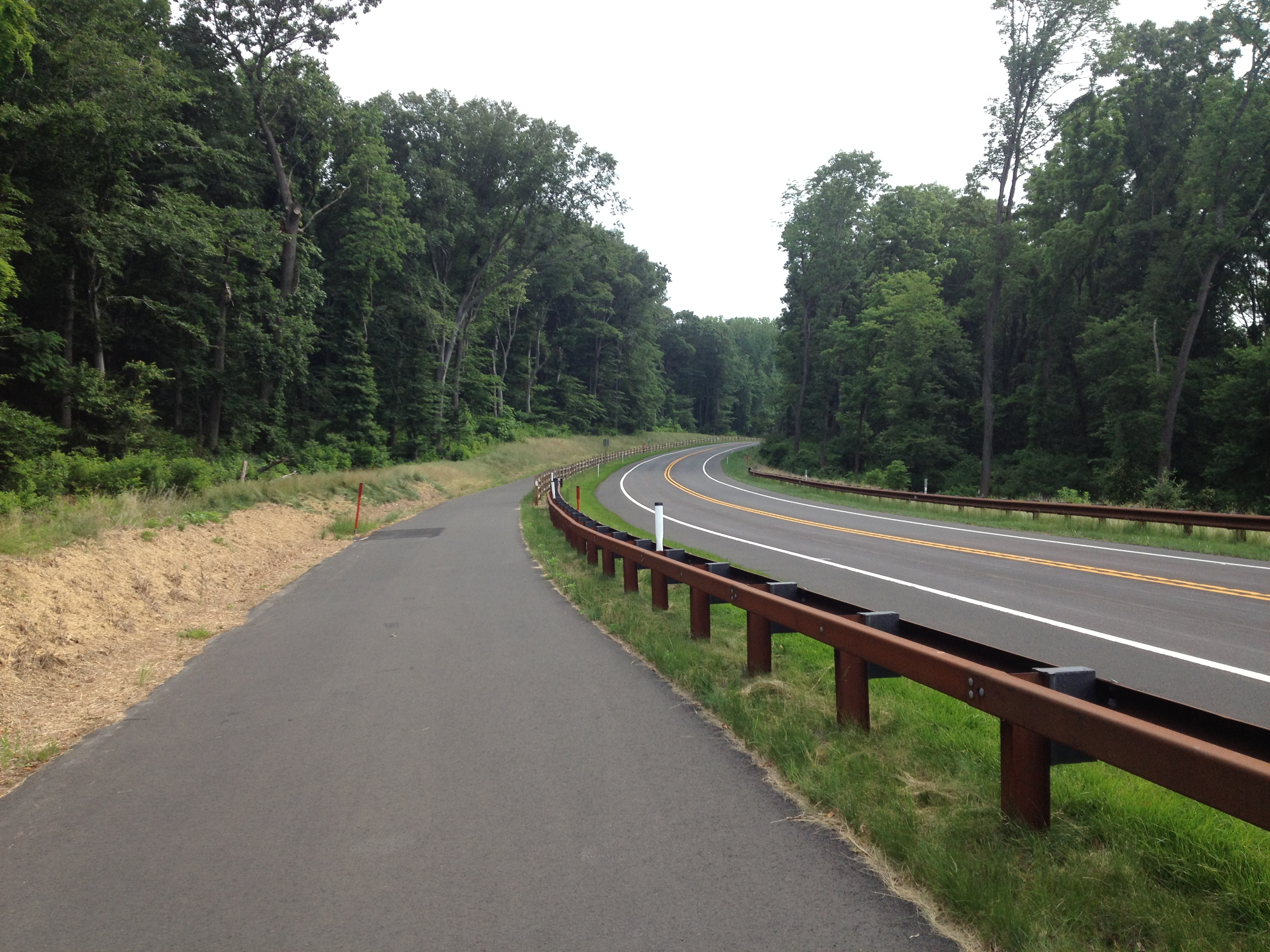
- US 202 Parkway Trail in Doylestown Township
- Length: 8.4 mi (13.5 km)
- Trailheads: PA 63 (Welsh Road) in Montgomery Township; 40°13′06″N 75°14′43″W; New Britain Road in Doylestown Township; 40°17′28″N 75°08′28″W
- Use: Multi-use, non-motorized
- Season: Year-round
- Surface: Asphalt

The US 202 Parkway Trail is a multi-use trail in the U.S. state of Pennsylvania that follows the U.S. Route 202 (US 202) parkway between Montgomery Township in Montgomery County and Doylestown Township in Bucks County. The trail has a length of 8.4 miles (13.5 km). Access to the US 202 Parkway Trail is provided through numerous trailheads along the route. The trail was constructed along with the US 202 parkway beginning in 2008 and was completed in 2012.

== Route ==
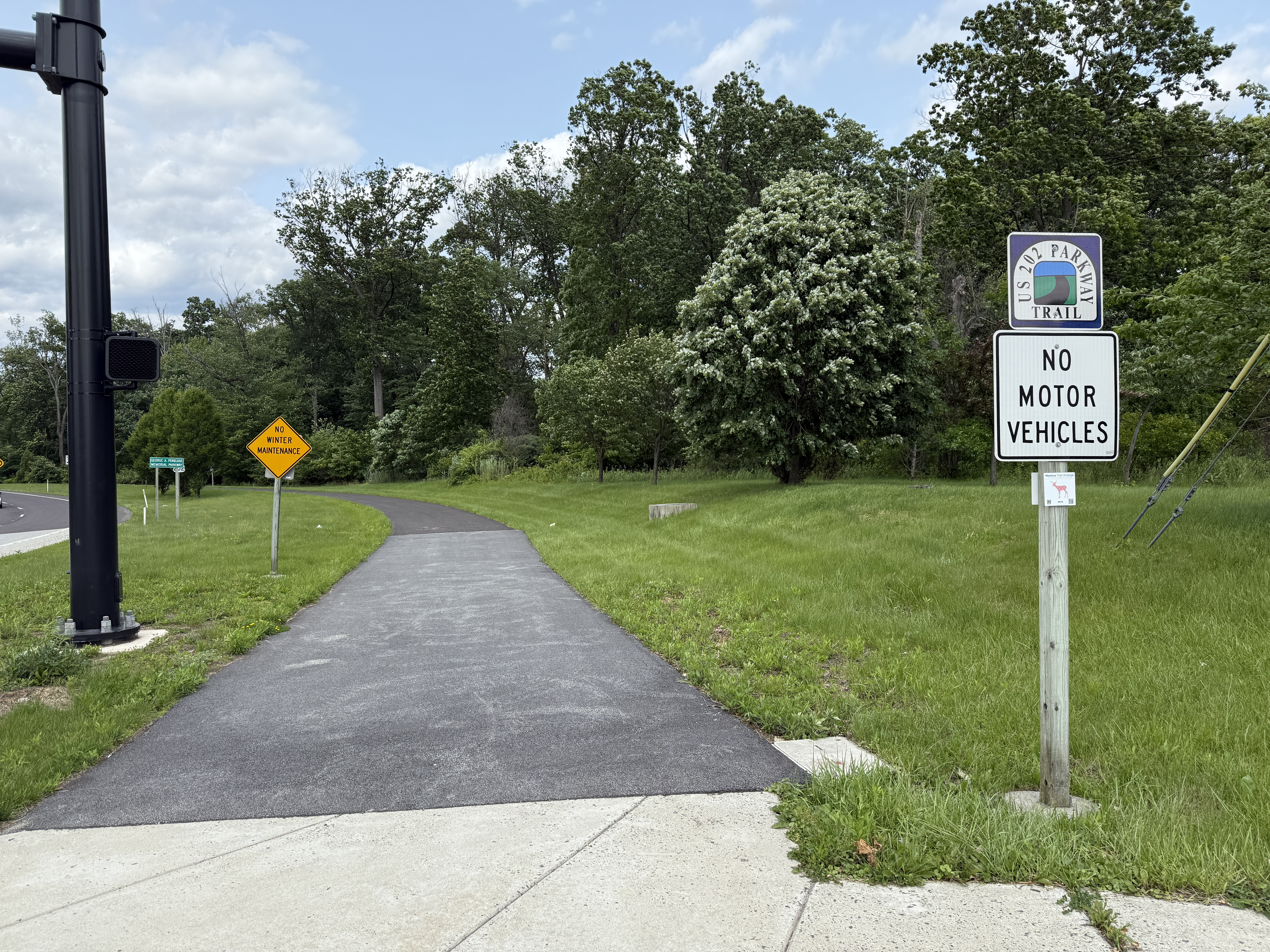
Beginning of the trail northbound at PA 63 in Montgomery Township

The US 202 Parkway Trail begins at an intersection between US 202 and PA 63 (Welsh Road) in Montgomery Township in Montgomery County. The trail heads north from PA 63 along the east side of the US 202 parkway. The US 202 Parkway Trail comes to an intersection with Knapp Road, where a path crosses US 202 and leads to a parking lot along Knapp Road. From here, the trail continues north to PA 309 (Bethlehem Pike), where it turns north along the west side of PA 309 and passes under US 202. The US 202 Parkway Trail reaches a parking lot along PA 309 and does a loop to head northeast along the west side of US 202 and come to a bridge over itself and PA 309. The trail continues northeast to the Costco Drive/Terrace Way intersection, where it crosses over to the east side of US 202. The US 202 Parkway Trail crosses PA 463 (Horsham Road), where the Joseph Ambler Inn is located to the east of the trail and offers restrooms and parking. Past PA 463, the trail continues northeast along the east side of US 202 to County Line Road.

Upon crossing County Line Road, the US 202 Parkway Trail enters Warrington Township in Bucks County and passes west of a parking lot providing access to the trail. The trail winds northeast along the east side of US 202 and crosses PA 152 (Limekiln Pike). Past PA 152, the US 202 Parkway Trail continues northeast and passes under Pickertown Road, with a spur providing access to that road. The trail reaches Bristol Road, where it crosses back to the west side of US 202 and comes to a parking lot. Following this, the US 202 Parkway Trail continues into Doylestown Township and comes to a bridge over the Neshaminy Creek. The trail winds northeast along the west side of US 202 and comes to Lower State Road, where it crosses to the east side of US 202. From here, the US 202 Parkway Trail heads east and comes to its terminus at a parking lot along New Britain Road next to Doylestown Central Park. Restrooms and parking are located at Doylestown Central Park. At its northern end, the US 202 Parkway Trail connects to the Doylestown Community Bike & Hike System.

The US 202 Parkway Trail has a total length of 8.4 miles (13.5 km). The trail is paved and is separated from the US 202 parkway by split-rail fences and grassy strips. The US 202 Parkway Trail features rolling hills and offers views of farmland and woodland.

== History ==
The US 202 Parkway Trail was planned as part of the US 202 parkway, a realignment of US 202 between Montgomeryville and Doylestown. The plans originally called for a freeway but were scaled back to a parkway in 2005 after funding for the road was cut. Construction on the US 202 parkway began in November 2008 for the section between PA 63 and PA 463. In January 2010, construction started for the section of the US 202 parkway between PA 463 and PA 611. The US 202 parkway and the US 202 Parkway Trail were opened on December 3, 2012. The US 202 Parkway Trail will have future connections to the Power Line Trail and the Neshaminy Creek Trail, the latter trail which will connect to the East Coast Greenway.

== Gallery ==
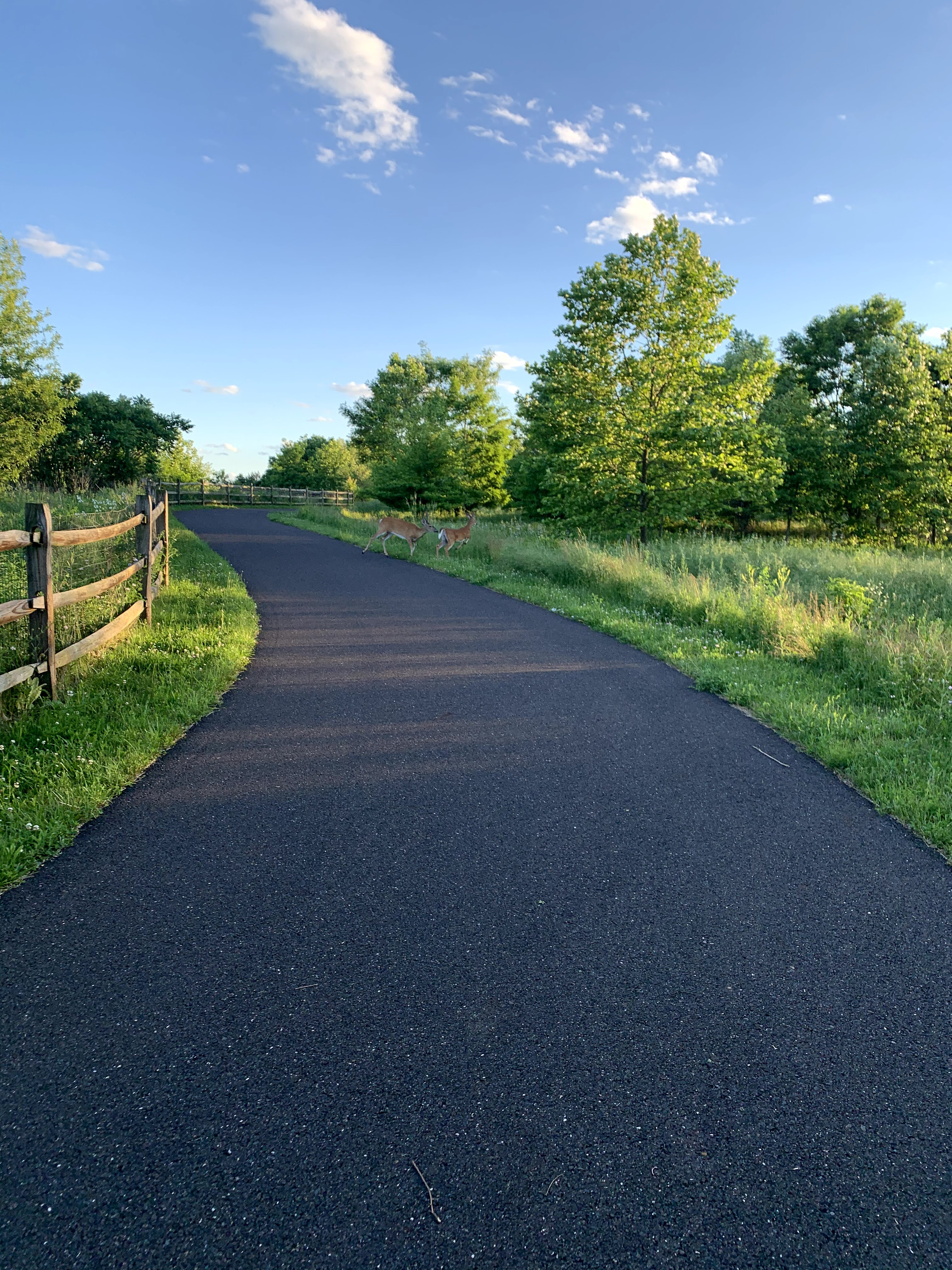
Deer on the trail

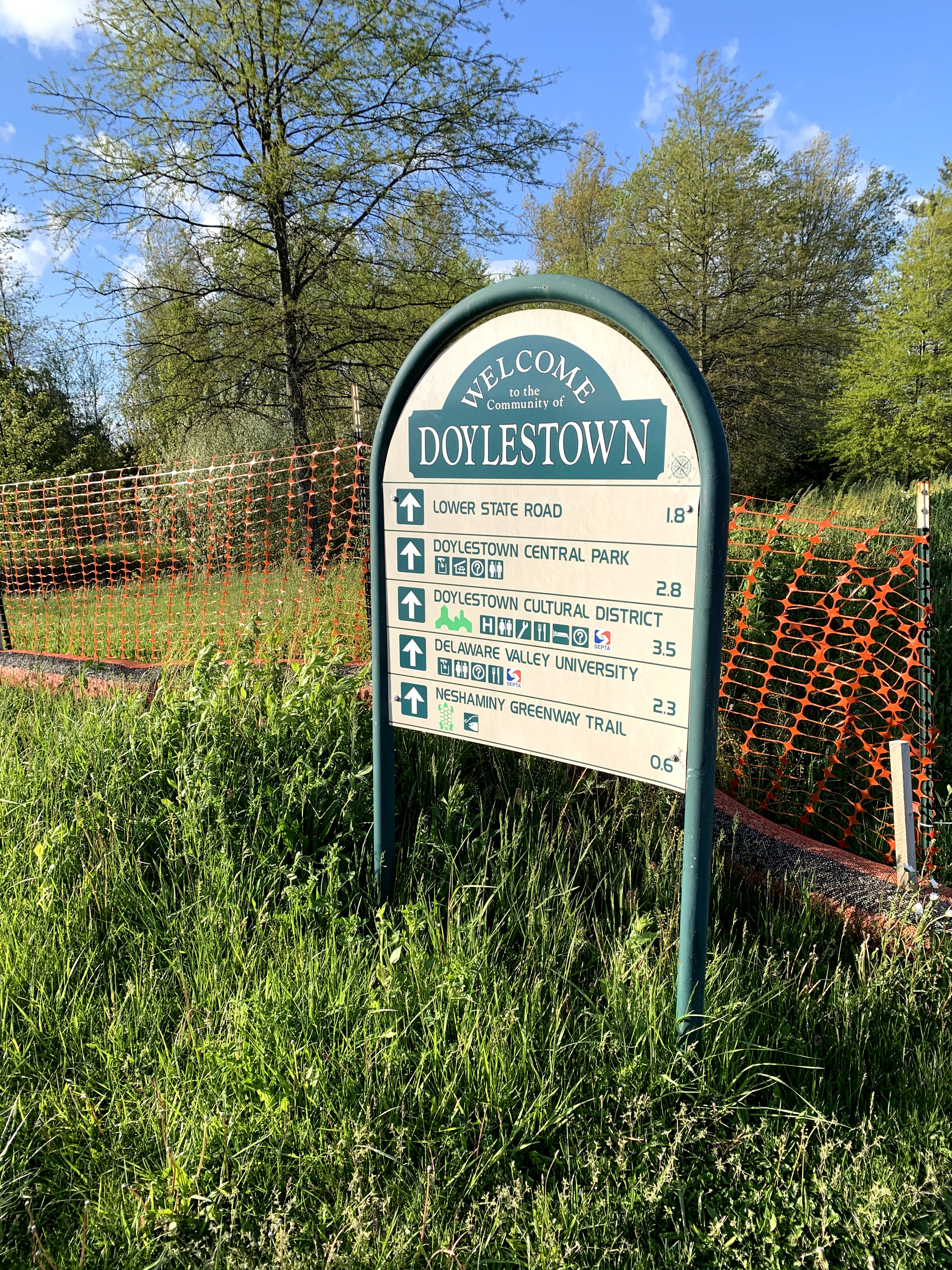
The trail near its junction with the Neshaminy Greenway Trail

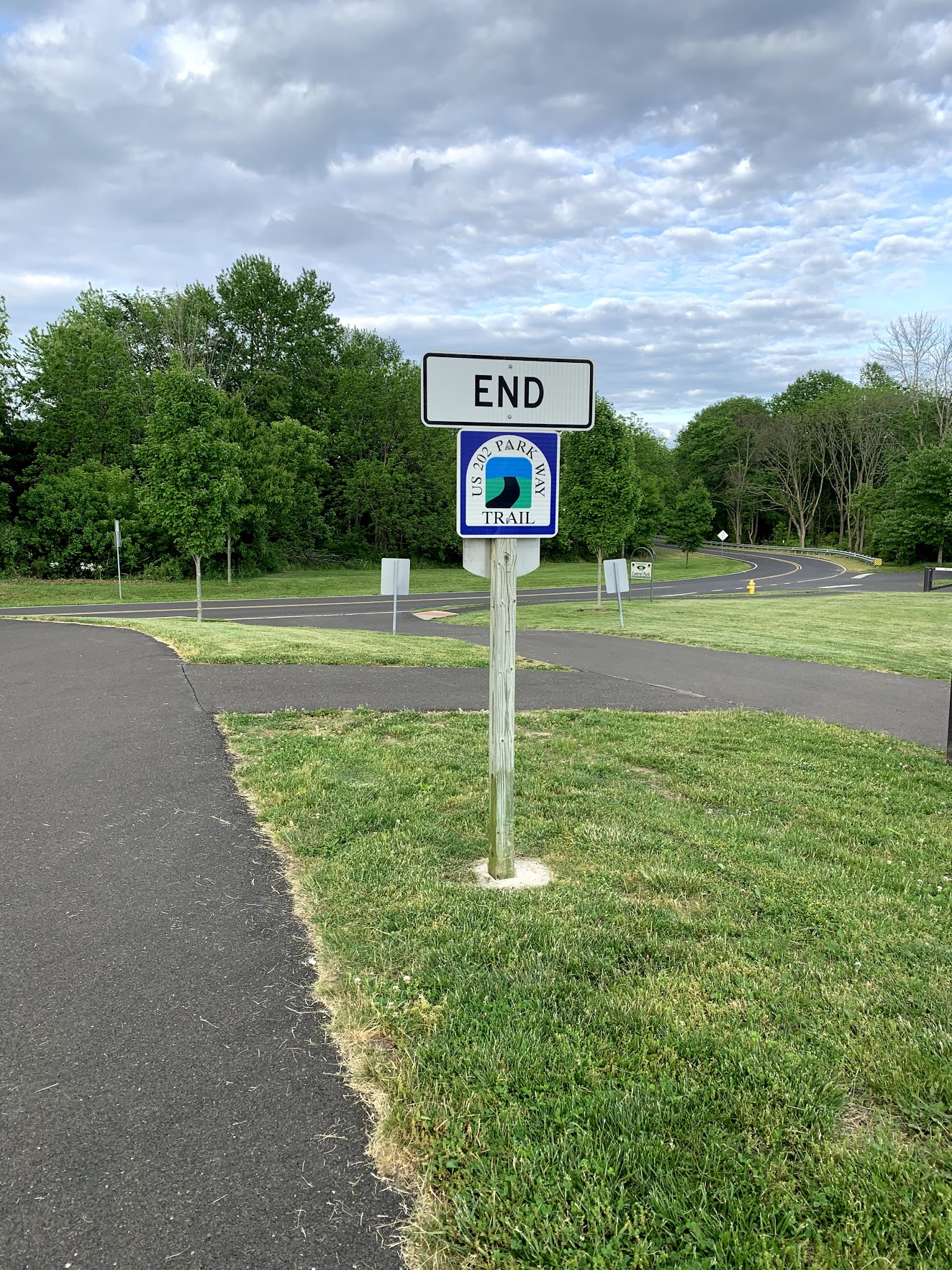
End of the trail in Doylestown
