= Leathers and Associates =

American playground construction company

Coordinates: 42.47576°N 76.43027°W

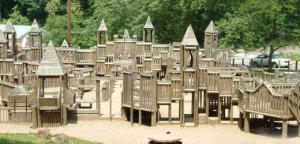
A typical example of the community-built wooden playground complexes associated with Leathers and Associates. This one was located in Dormont, Pennsylvania.

Leathers and Associates is a family-owned playground construction company based in Ithaca, New York, United States, best known for having coordinated community-led construction of large wooden playground parks in many towns across the United States during the 1980s and 1990s.

== History ==
Robert "Bob" Leathers founded Leathers and Associates in the early 1980s after he had coordinated about five playground construction projects in the 1970s, starting with Ithaca. Over the next couple decades, Leathers and Associates oversaw the construction of over 2,000 playgrounds, mostly in the United States, but also in Israel and Australia.

Leathers' playground projects quickly gained national attention. In 1982, The Washington Post called the unique approach to playgrounds a "burgeoning movement." In 1986, construction of two separate Leathers playgrounds were featured in popular PBS children's television programs, one on Mister Rogers' Neighborhood and the other on Sesame Street. In 1989, the Chicago Tribune referred to Bob Leathers as "the guru of contemporary playground design."

In later years, Leathers and Associates was faced with growing safety and upkeep complaints concerning their older playgrounds. After Leathers' son Marc took ownership of the company in the 2005, Leathers and Associates transitioned away from an exclusive focus on community building projects and towards paid contract work.

== Community playgrounds (1980s–1990s) ==
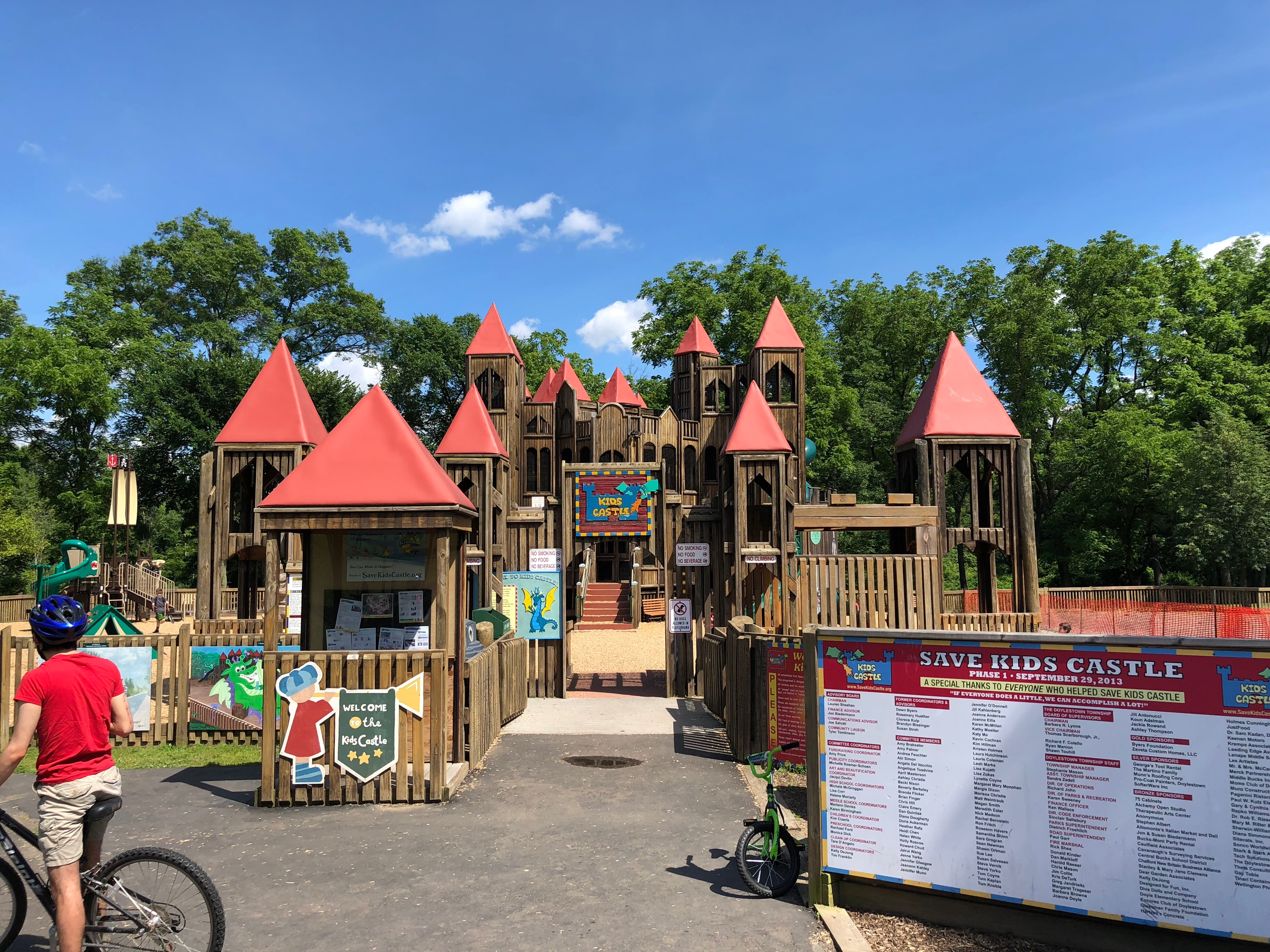
A Leathers playground in Doylestown, Pennsylvania, built in 1997 and renovated in 2013.

=== Construction process ===
The Leathers and Associates community playgrounds were largely paid for by fundraising. In 1989, a typical project cost between $10,000 and $60,000, with Leathers and Associates receiving $1,500 to $9,500. Construction was preceded by a planning process during which children in the community were asked to produce essays and drawings expressing their ideas and desires for the new playground. Leathers and Associates would advise and oversee the fundraising and planning process, while actual construction would be accomplished by a team of volunteers, usually over a period of four days.

=== Features ===
The characteristic feature of Leathers and Associates community playgrounds was a near-exclusive reliance on wood as the building material. Projects ranged in size from schoolyard playgrounds to 1.5-acre (0.61 ha) community park complexes. Playgrounds often included non-traditional features such as castles, drawbridges, child-sized wooden tunnels, PVC pipe "walkie-talkies," and tire swings, and often incorporated recycled objects, such as telephone poles, tires, and barrels.

=== Subsequent concerns ===
Communities with Leathers playgrounds from this time period have been faced with concerns over liability issues, inaccessibility for children with disabilities, and the need to meet increasing government safety regulations. At the time when the community playgrounds were being built, the wood being used was routinely treated with chromated copper arsenate, a compound subsequently banned because of the risk of arsenic leakage. Communities have faced expensive costs related to upkeep, restoration, replacement, or disassembly.
