= New Britain station =

Railway station in New Britain, Pennsylvania

New Britain
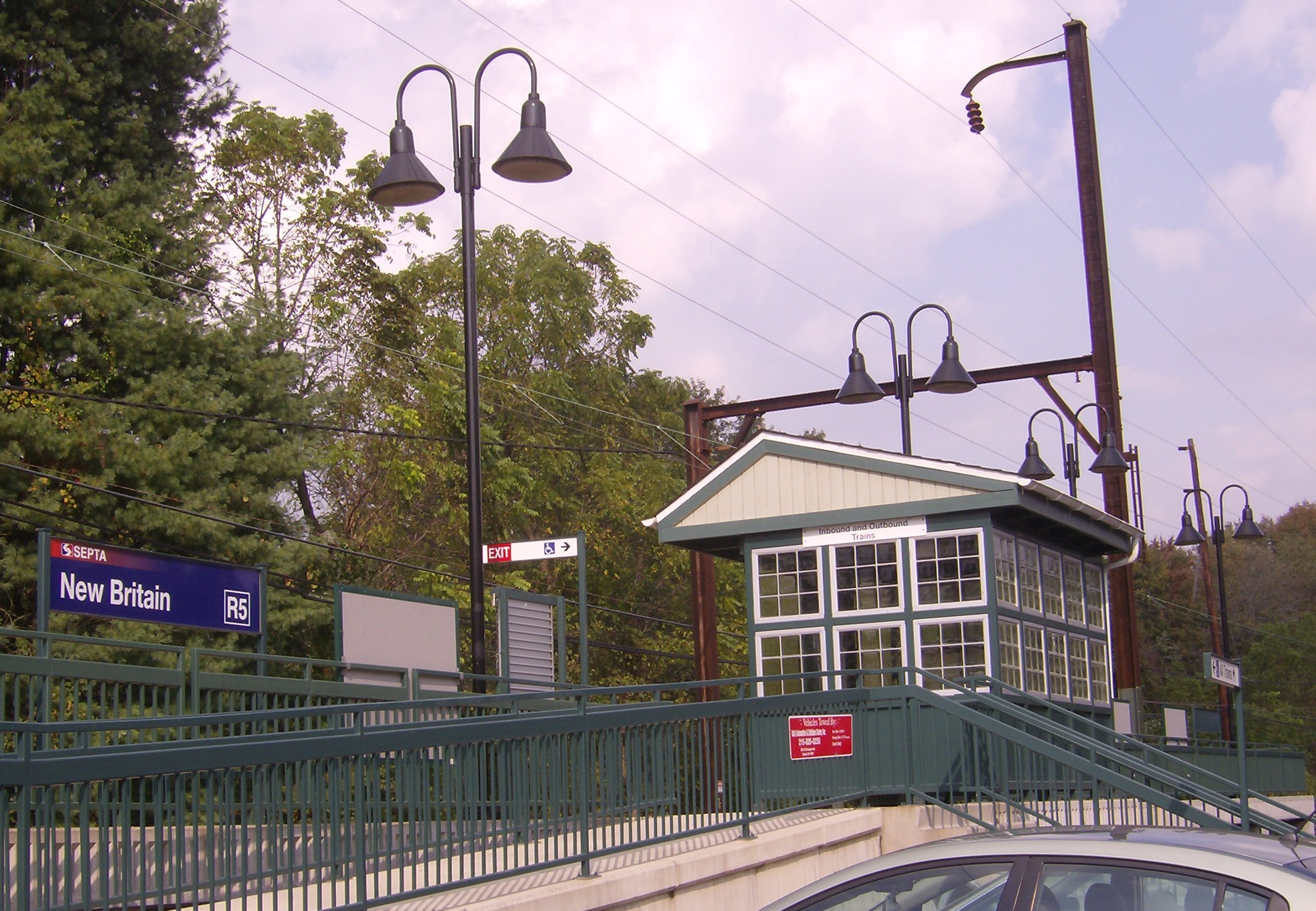

General information
- Location: New Britain Station, South Tamenend Avenue; New Britain, Pennsylvania, 18901
- Coordinates: 40.2972°N 75.1798°W
- Owner: SEPTA
- Platforms: 1 side platform
- Tracks: 1
- Connections: BCT: DART West

Construction
- Parking: 39
- Cycle facilities: Yes
- Accessible: Yes

Other information
- Fare zone: 4

History
- Electrified: July 26, 1931

Services
Preceding station	SEPTA	Following station
Chalfont toward Penn Medicine Station	Lansdale/Doylestown Line	Delaware Valley University toward Doylestown
Former services
Preceding station	Reading Railroad	Following station
Chalfont toward Lansdale	Doylestown Branch	Farm School toward Doylestown
Location

New Britain station is a SEPTA Regional Rail station in New Britain, Pennsylvania. Located at Tamenend and Matthews Avenues, it serves the Lansdale/Doylestown Line. On December 18, 2011, weekend service was discontinued at this station due to low ridership. In the fall of 2012, New Britain was added back to the weekend schedule as a flag stop. The station continues to have full service on weekdays. In FY 2013, the station had a weekday average of 51 boardings and 58 alightings.
