= Samuel Aaron =

American teacher and minister (1800–1865)

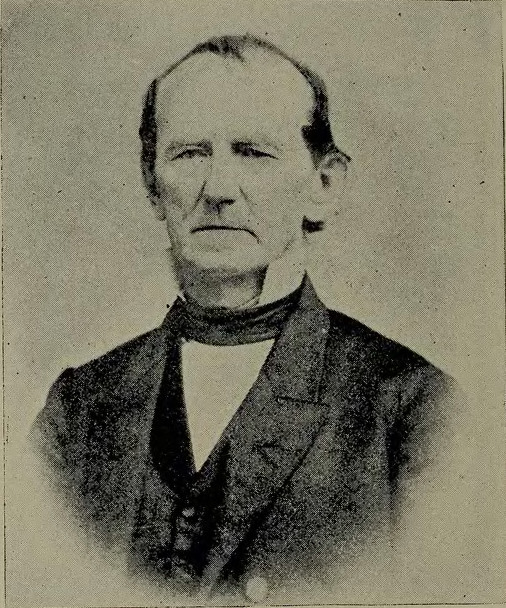
- Born: 19 October 1800; New Britain
- Died: 11 April 1865; Mount Holly

Samuel Aaron (b. in New Britain, Bucks Co., Pa., in 1800; d. in Mount Holly, N. J., 11 April 1865) was an American educator and Baptist minister.

== Life ==
Aaron was left an orphan at six years of age, and became the ward of an uncle, upon whose farm he worked for several years, attending school only in winter. A small legacy inherited from his father enabled him at the age of sixteen to enter the Doylestown, Pa., academy, where he fitted himself to become a teacher, and at the age of twenty was engaged as an assistant instructor in the classical and mathematical school in Burlington, N. J. Here he studied and taught, and soon opened an independent day school at Bridge Point, but was presently invited to become principal of Doylestown Academy. In 1829 he was ordained, and became pastor of a Baptist church in New Britain. In 1833 he took charge of the Burlington high school, serving at the same time as pastor of the Baptist church in that city. Accepting in 1841 an invitation from a church in Norristown, Pa., he remained there three years, when he opened the Treemount Seminary near Norristown, which under his management soon became prosperous, and won a high reputation for the thoroughness of its training and discipline. The financial disasters of 1857 found Aaron with his name pledged as security for a friend, and he was obliged to sacrifice all his property to the creditors. He was soon offered the head-mastership of Mount Holly Institute, a large, well-established school for boys, where, in company with his son as joint principal, he spent the remainder of his life. During these years he was pastor of a church in Mt. Holly. He prepared a valuable series of text-books introducing certain improvements in methods of instruction, which added greatly to his reputation as an educator. His only publication in book form, aside from his text-books, was entitled Faithful Translation (Philadelphia, 1842). He was among the early advocates of temperance, and was an earnest supporter of the anti-slavery cause from its beginning.
