= Fretz Farm =

- Formerly listed on the U.S. National Register of Historic Places
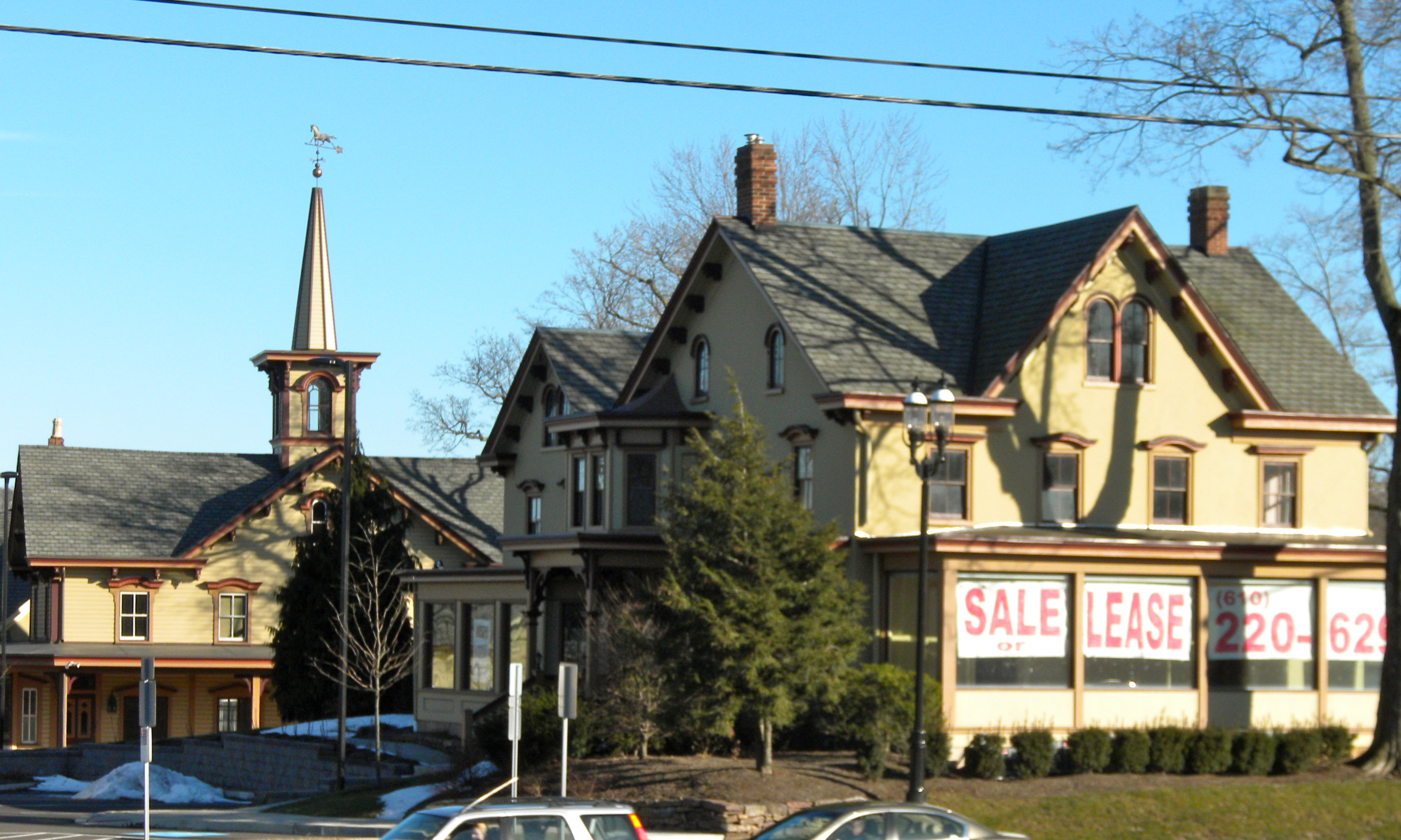
- Fretz Farm, March 2010

- Location within Pennsylvania Location within the United States
- Nearest city: Almshouse Road and Pennsylvania Route 611, Doylestown Township, Pennsylvania
- Coordinates: 40°16′15″N 75°07′44″W
- Area: 3.6 acres (1.5 ha)
- Built: 1812, 1846
- Built by: Fretz, John
- Architectural style: Italianate
- NRHP reference No.: 85000459

Significant dates
- Added to NRHP: March 7, 1985
- Removed from NRHP: August 16, 2012

Fretz Farm was a historic house and farm complex located in Doylestown Township Township, Bucks County, Pennsylvania. It had five contributing buildings and one contributing structure. They were the farmhouse, barn, carriage house, small barn / corn crib, old barn, gazebo, and pump house. The buildings were in the Italianate style.

It was added to the National Register of Historic Places in 1985. It was delisted in 2012.
