= Central Park (Doylestown Township, Pennsylvania) =

Park in Pennsylvania, United States

Doylestown Central Park
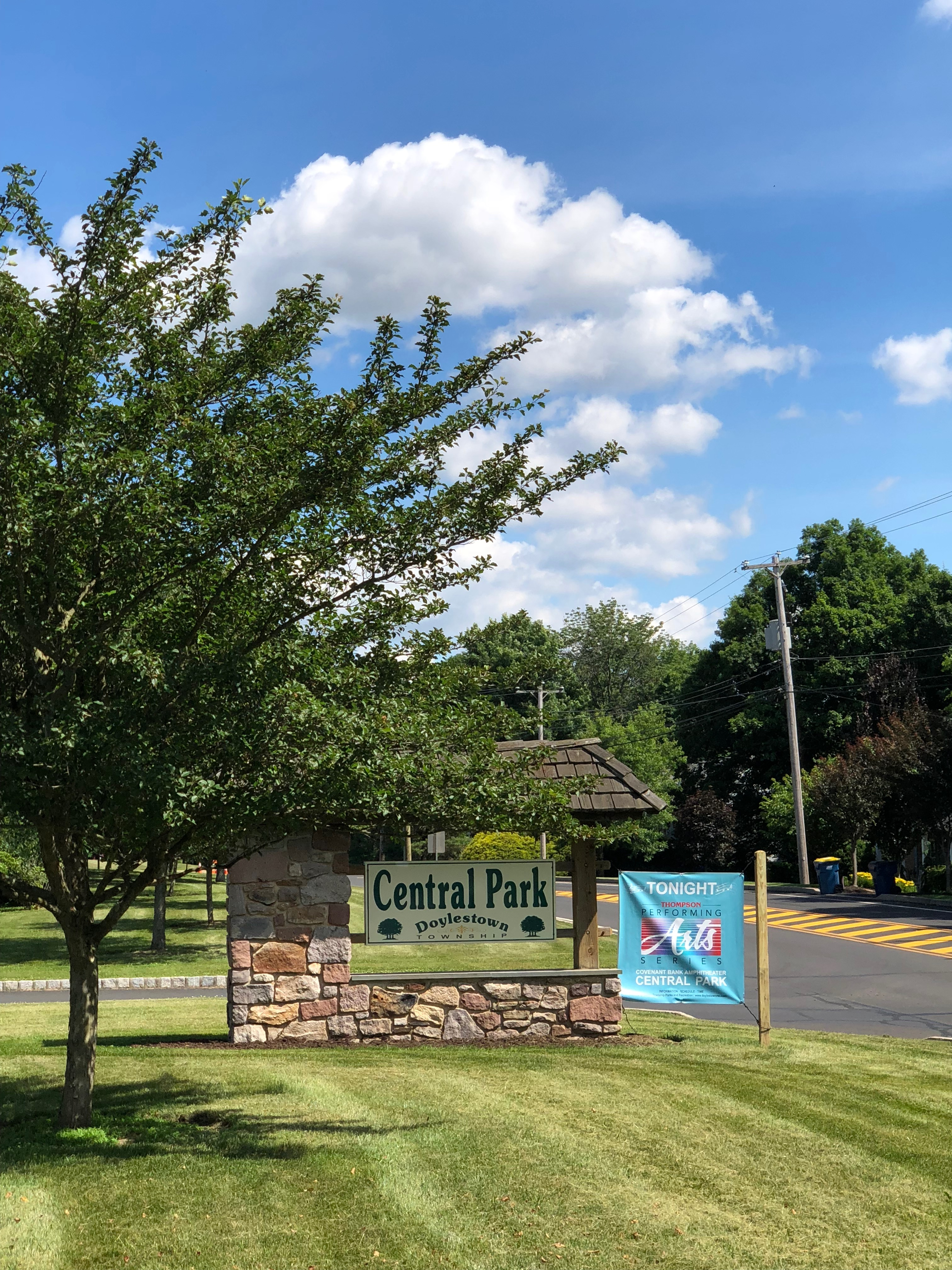
- Main entrance to Doylestown Central Park, located on Wells Rd.

- Location within Pennsylvania
- Type: Municipal park
- Location: Doylestown Township, Pennsylvania
- Coordinates: 40°17′15″N 75°08′20″W
- Area: 125.5 acres (50.8 hectares)
- Created: 1995

Central Park in Doylestown Township, Pennsylvania is a 125.5-acre area of land owned by the township for recreational use. It is the largest park owned by Doylestown Township, 30 of these acres are being leased to the neighboring Delaware Valley College for farming use.

As part of the network of parks in the Doylestown Township and Borough, the purposes of the park are to help foster better health and wellness, serve as protection to the environment and maintain economic prosperity in the surrounding areas. These goals are in line with both state and local Park and Recreation Plans including: Pennsylvania's Recreation Plan, Regional Land Use Plan for Delaware Valley, Bucks County Park and Recreation Plan and others. This space is a dedicated green space consisting of basketball courts, tennis courts soccer fields and walking trails. Doylestown Central Park also includes some more unique features such as Kids Castle and a sensory trail for visitors with disabilities.

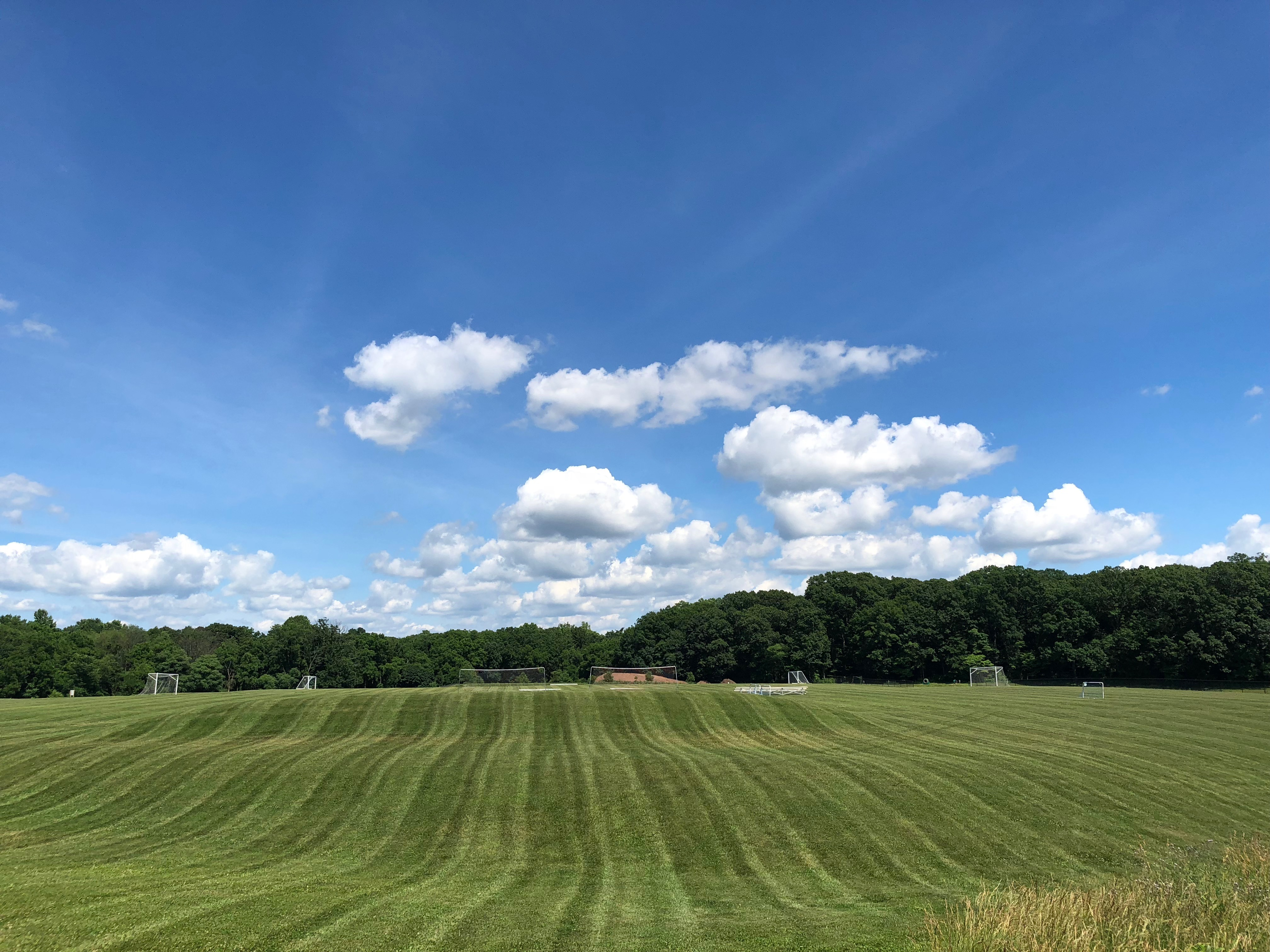
Soccer Fields at Doylestown Central Park

== General ==
Doylestown Central Park is open every day from dawn to dusk. Central Park contains both green space and recreation space including: 5 tennis courts, 2 basketball courts, 3 soccer fields, a bocce court, a golf link, an amphitheater, a toddler play area, Kids Castle and trails for hiking, walking or biking. Both the tennis and basketball courts have coin operated lighting to illuminate the play area.

== History ==
Central Park was dedicated and opened to the public on June 10, 1995. The land was purchased for $3.7 million from a developer in 1991. The land was originally owned by the local Delaware Valley University. The park was planned under the guidance of the Central Park and Facilities Planning Committee, chaired by John T. Carson Jr. The land was considered an ideal site for a park due to its proximity to a township building located next door on Wells road. This would allow for ease of connection to already existing municipal water, sewage, and electricity lines, decreasing both time and building costs. Since its inception, planners wanted to ensure that the park had both passive and active areas while minimally changing the existing landscape. In 1994, the township received a DCA grant of $100,000 for park development. By 1994, the parking lots, tennis courts, basketball courts, and walking trail were completed.

== Park Amenities ==
=== Kids Castle ===
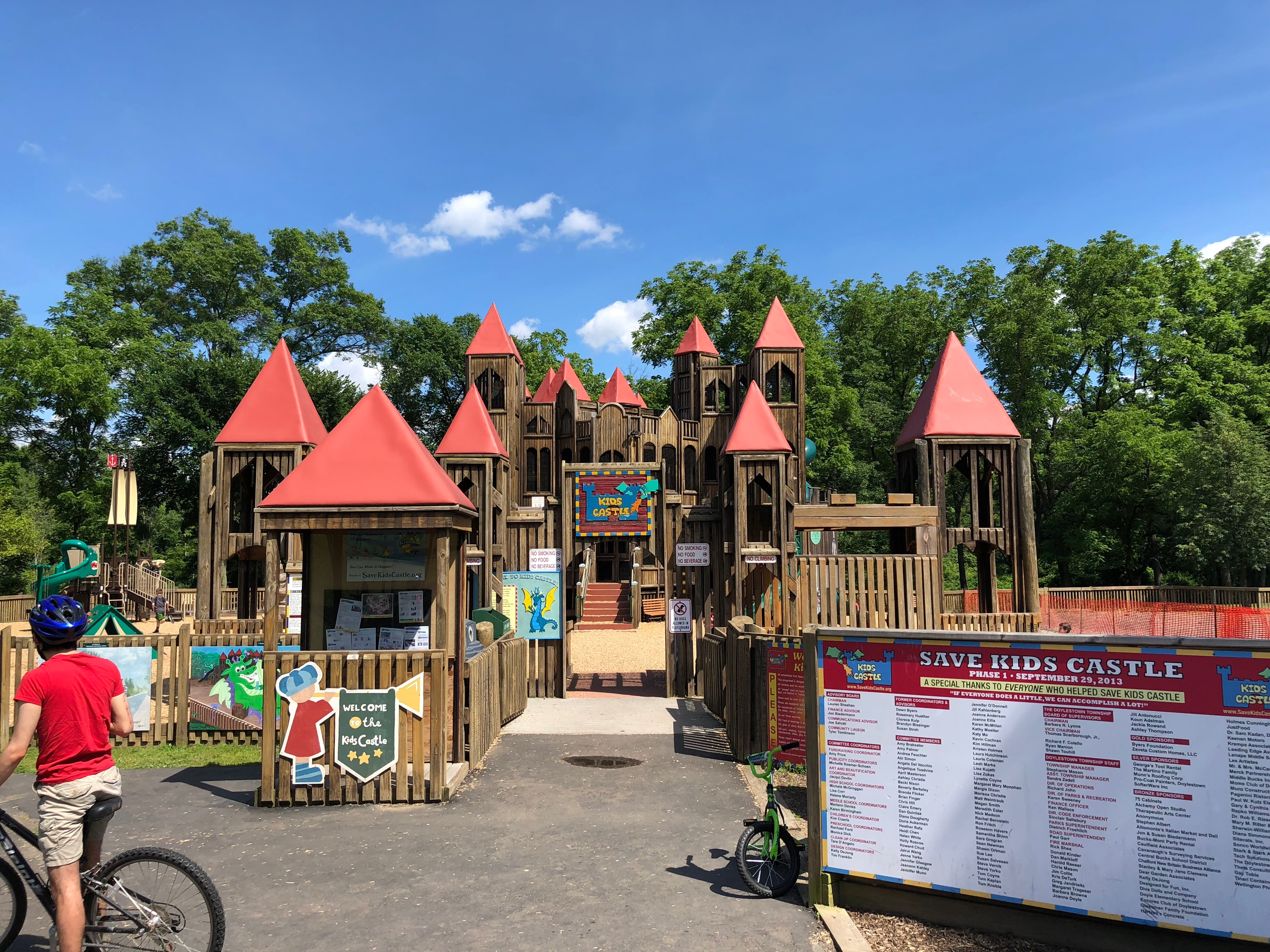
Kid's Castle, renovated in 2013

Kids Castle was inspired by the local castles built by the late Henry Chapman Mercer and opened on June 22, 1997. The design of the playground was an effort by a team of local architects as well as students from the Central Bucks School District. Bob Leathers was hired as architect to refine the design. A group called Friends of Kids Castle formed in 2012, with the mission of protecting this playground. The original structure was made of pressure treated wood, but due to heavy use and weathering Kids Castle underwent a renovation in March 2013 costing $150,000. The renovation lasted just under 7 months. Although the main castle is currently open for public use, part of the renovation included removal of other older playground equipment. The next phase of renovation includes the installation of new playground equipment as well as resurfacing to allow for inclusion of children of all abilities. Completion of the next phases of renovation will require $600,000.

=== Covenant Bank Amphitheater ===
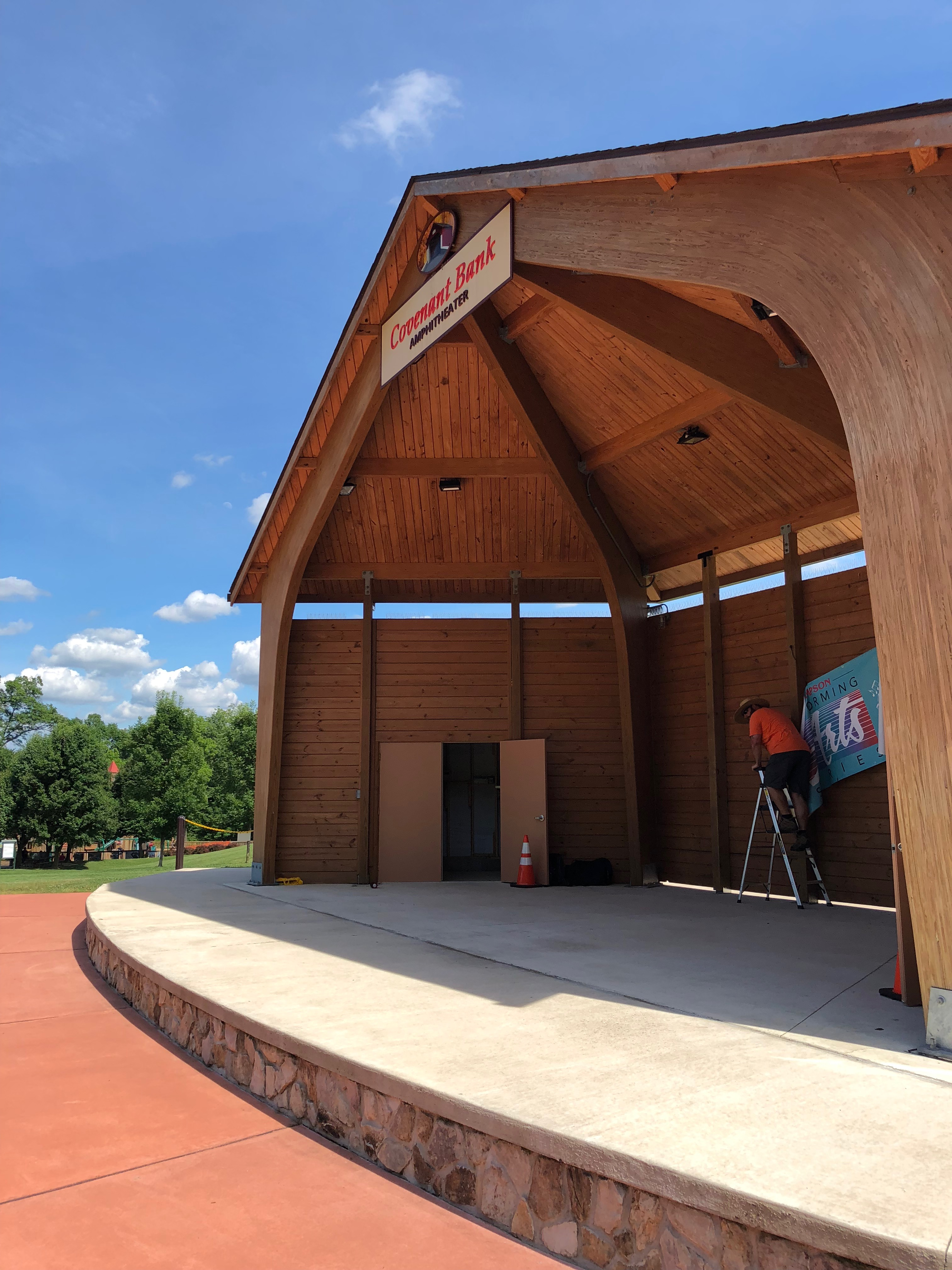
Covenant Bank Amphitheater

The Doylestown Township and Borough identified in a 2007 Community Park, Recreation and Open Space Plan that building an amphitheater in Central Park would be a short term priority (accomplished between 2008-2010). This came in response to 66% of resident survey respondents stating an amphitheater would be a priority. In the same document it was stressed that in the planning process, it would be critical for the amphitheater to be established as a park hub, not just another structure. The cost for materials and building came to $136,000 all of which came directly from 20 years of fundraising. The amphitheater includes a stage, with an area for storage as well as a changing room and bathroom. The Amphitheater hosts music concerts and free movies in the summer months. Previous to the construction of the physical building, the hillside on which it is located was considered a natural amphitheater and hosted its first concert series in the summer of 1995.

=== Hike and Bike Trails ===
Doylestown Central Park is an end point to the 8.5 mile long US 202 Parkway Trail. The current trail is paved and continues alongside the U.S. Route 202 parkway to Pennsylvania Route 63 (Welsh Road) in Montgomeryville. There are plans to extend the trail past Pennsylvania Route 63 into Norristown. There is a parking lot located at the entrance on New Britain Road, allowing for easy access to the trail head.

Additionally, there are several connections around Central Park to the Doylestown Hike and Bike System. The first connection was between the park and the neighboring Klutz Elementary School. Supported by both the Doylestown Township and Borough, the Hike and Bike System started its planning stages in 1992, and continues to expand. The goal is to increase connectivity between schools, parks and other points around the township.

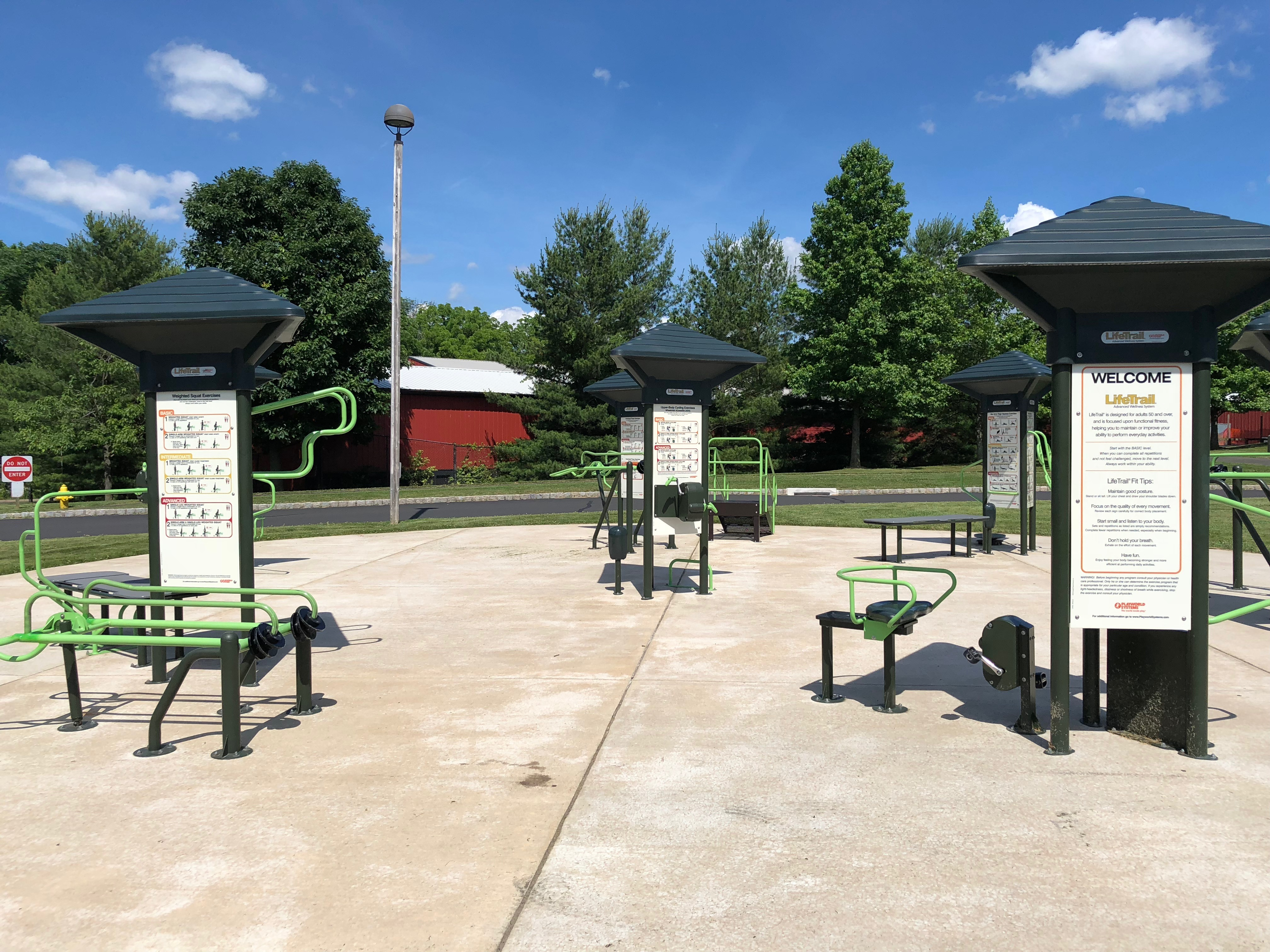
Functional Fitness station for adults 50+ at Doylestown Central Park

=== Fitness Trails ===
Doylestown Central park has several fitness stations installed around the park along the walking trail. Weather permitting, outdoor boot camp classes are hosted on Monday and Wednesday evenings from 6:00-7:00 p.m.

For adults 50 and older, a separate LifeTrail area is available for use. Each station has detailed diagrams depicting usage, as well as different levels of difficulty. A guidance video of equipment use can be viewed on YouTube.

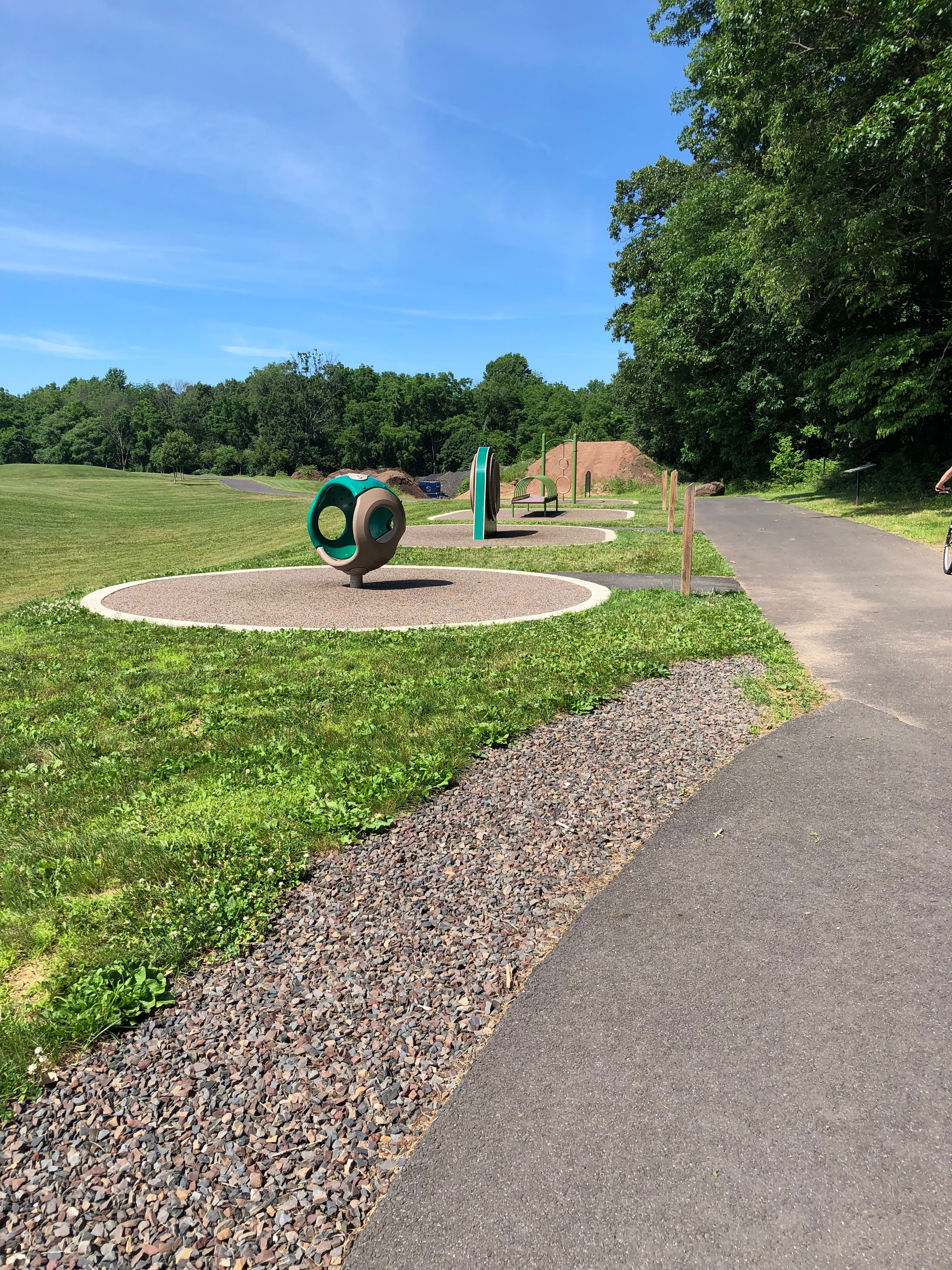
4 out of 9 pods of the Sensory Trail

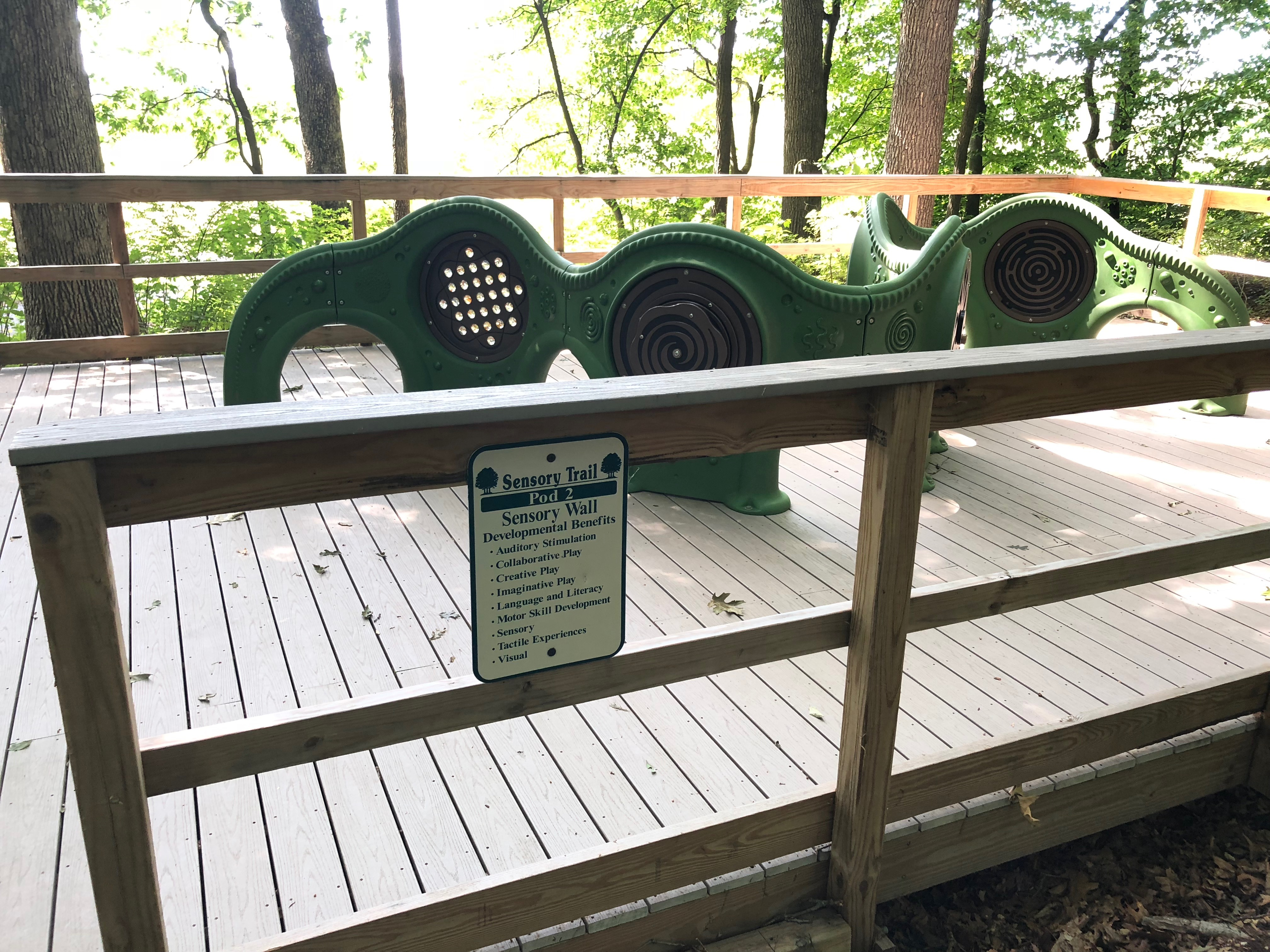
A pod along the sensory trail boardwalk

=== Sensory Trail ===
The Sensory Trail opened in October, 2016. It is most readily accessible from the New Brittain road entrance. The sensory trail consists of 9 separate sections, called pods. Some are located along the walking path, and others are within Hart's Woods along a boardwalk. 5 of the pods are wheelchair accessible. Each pod highlights different sensory integration techniques, to help children of all needs (particularly on the autism spectrum) interact with the natural environment. This sensory trail is thought to be one a kind in the state of Pennsylvania. The sensory trail was created in response to the Park and Recreation board wanting to make Central Park more accessible to people of all abilities. The sensory trail cost a total of $442,000 to build, with contributions from the Doylestown Township ($191,000), Foundations Community Partnership ($30,000), Doylestown Lions Club ($30,000), Village improvement Association ($30,000) and a grant from the Commonwealth of Pennsylvania, Commonwealth Financing Authority. Foundations Community Partnership Grant, Boucher & James, Inc., Pickering Corts and Summerson as well as the Doylestown Township board of Supervisors helped with the design and construction of the sensory trail. Further expansion of the sensory trail may be added with more donations.

== Park Wildlife ==
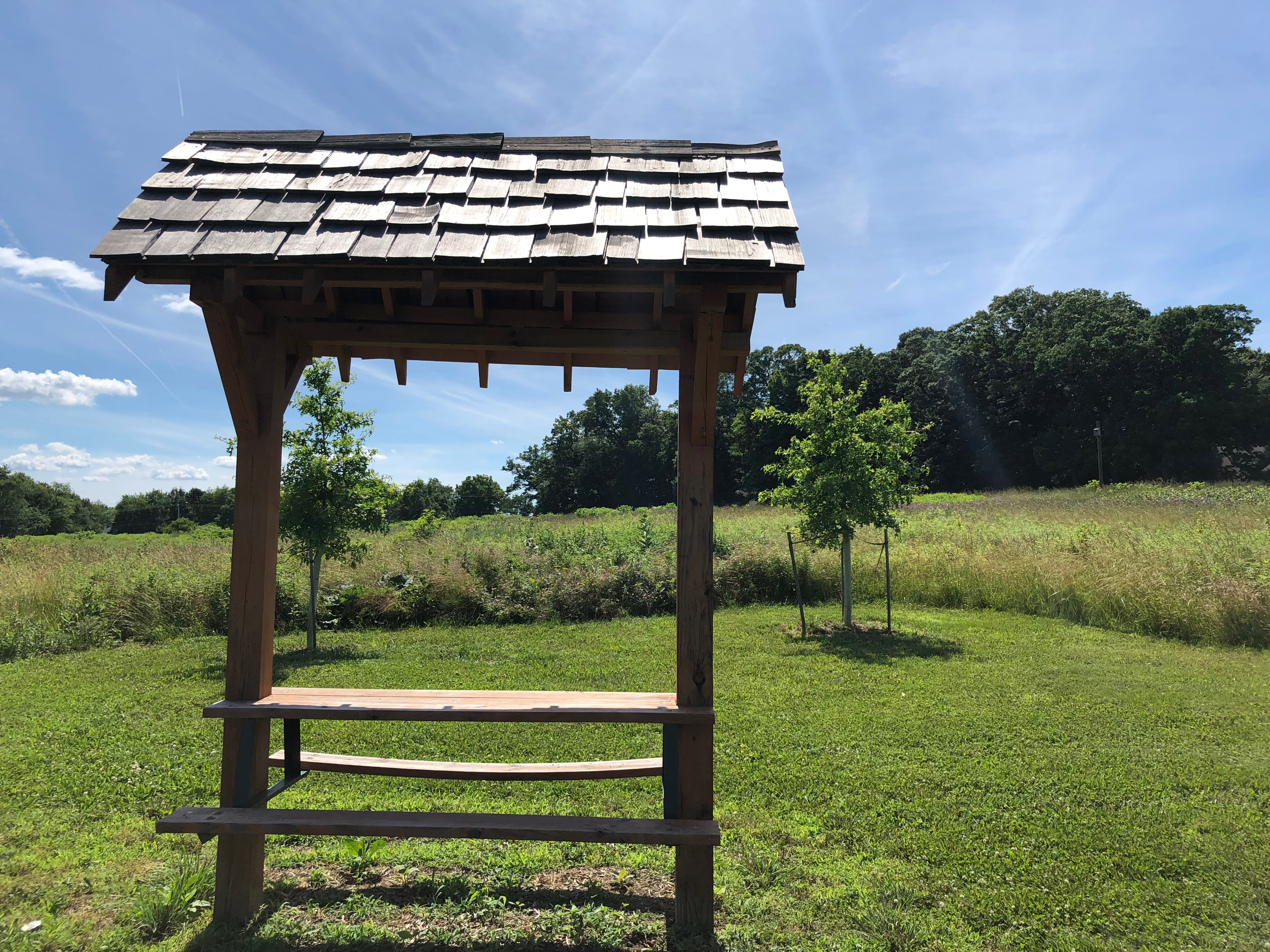
Picnic bench overlooking meadow at Doylestown Central Park

=== Meadow ===
Included as one of the park's passive green areas, the meadow is a portion of the park which remains unmowed. The meadow provides valuable habitat to a variety of species, including the native Blue Bird. The Bucks County Audubon Society as well as members of the Doylestown community sought to increase the native bird population by building and placing nesting boxes in and around the area, including in Central Park. This effort has dramatically increased blue bird sightings from just 2 in 1992 to 100 or more hatchlings a year in 2015. The meadow requires some maintenance by park staff to prevent the growth of shrubs and trees. The meadow habitat allows for different species including:

- Eastern tiger swallowtail, Papilio glaucus
- American grasshopper, Schistocerca americana
- Red-winged blackbird, Agelaius phoeniceus
- Milkweed, Asclepias syriaca
- New York ironweed, Vernonia noveboracensis
- Goldenrod, Solidago rugosa

=== Storm Water Pond ===
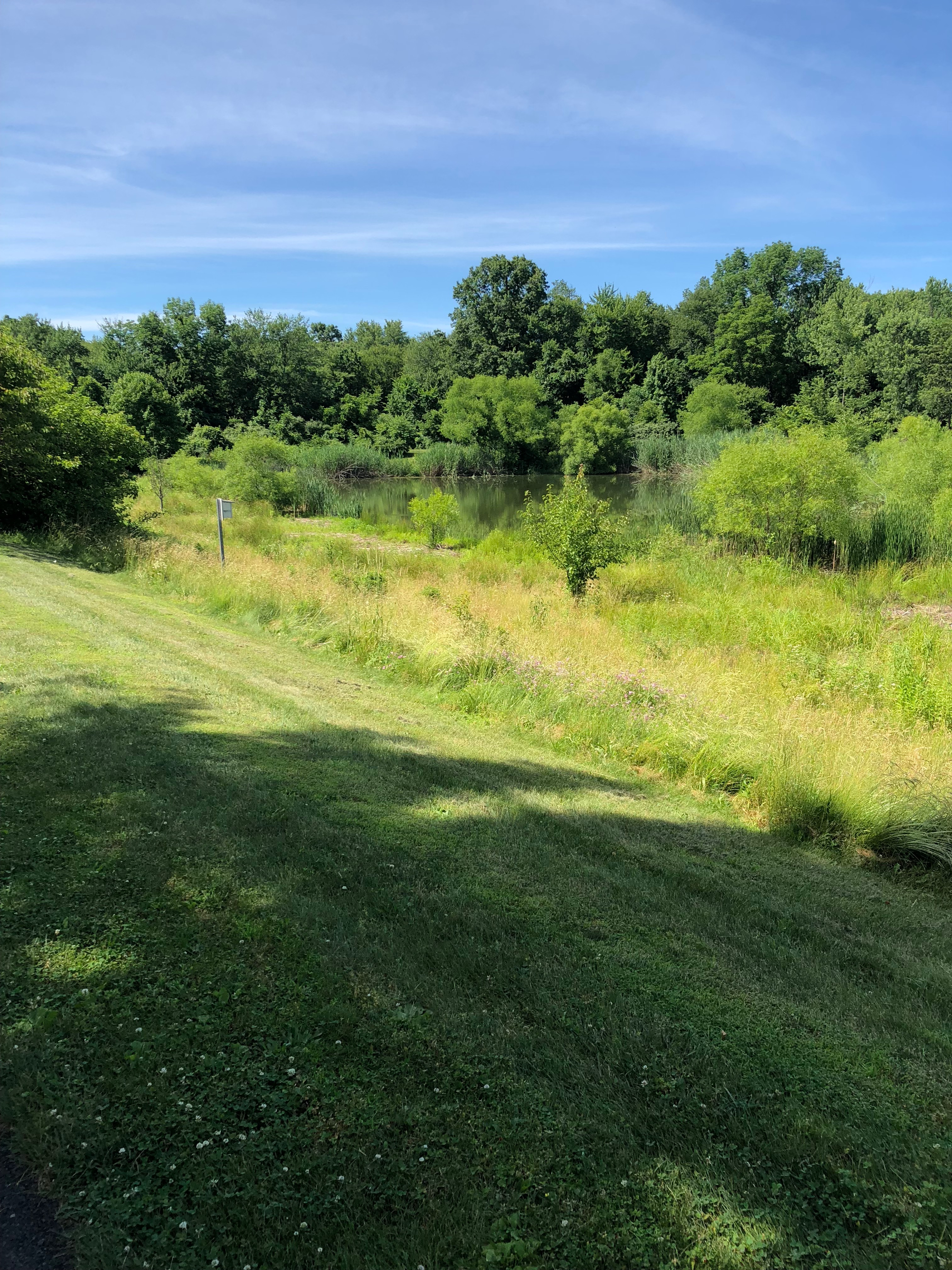
Storm Water Pond

Adjacent to Kid's castle across the bridge, there is a storm water pond. This storm water pond is also across from the Edgar N. Putman Environmental Education Center. This pond collects excess precipitation runoff. Next to the walkway, a sign details the importance of keeping waterways clean and clear. This storm water pond is considered part of the passive features of Doylestown Central Park, allowing for species to inhabit it, and park visitors to enjoy access to wildlife.

=== Hart's Woods ===
A portion of Hart's Woods remains intact within Doylestown Central Park. The forest historically spread to past where US 202 currently The forest is part of a geological formation called Piedmont Physiographic Province, spanning from New Jersey through Pennsylvania and as far south as Alabama. The clay soil here is known to be fertile and is able to support the growth of the mature Oak-Beech Hart's Woods. The habitat of Hart's Woods allows for different species including:

- American Beech, Fagus grandifolia
- Red Oak, Quercus rubra
- Spicebush, Lindera benzoin
- False Solomon's Seal, Maianthemum racemosum
- Wood Thrush, Hylocichla mustelina
- American Woodcock, Scolopax minor
- Ovenbird, Seiurus aurocapilla

In the interest of protecting these species, the Hart's Woods portion of the park is a designated wildlife area, and is off limits to dogs.

== Environmental education area ==
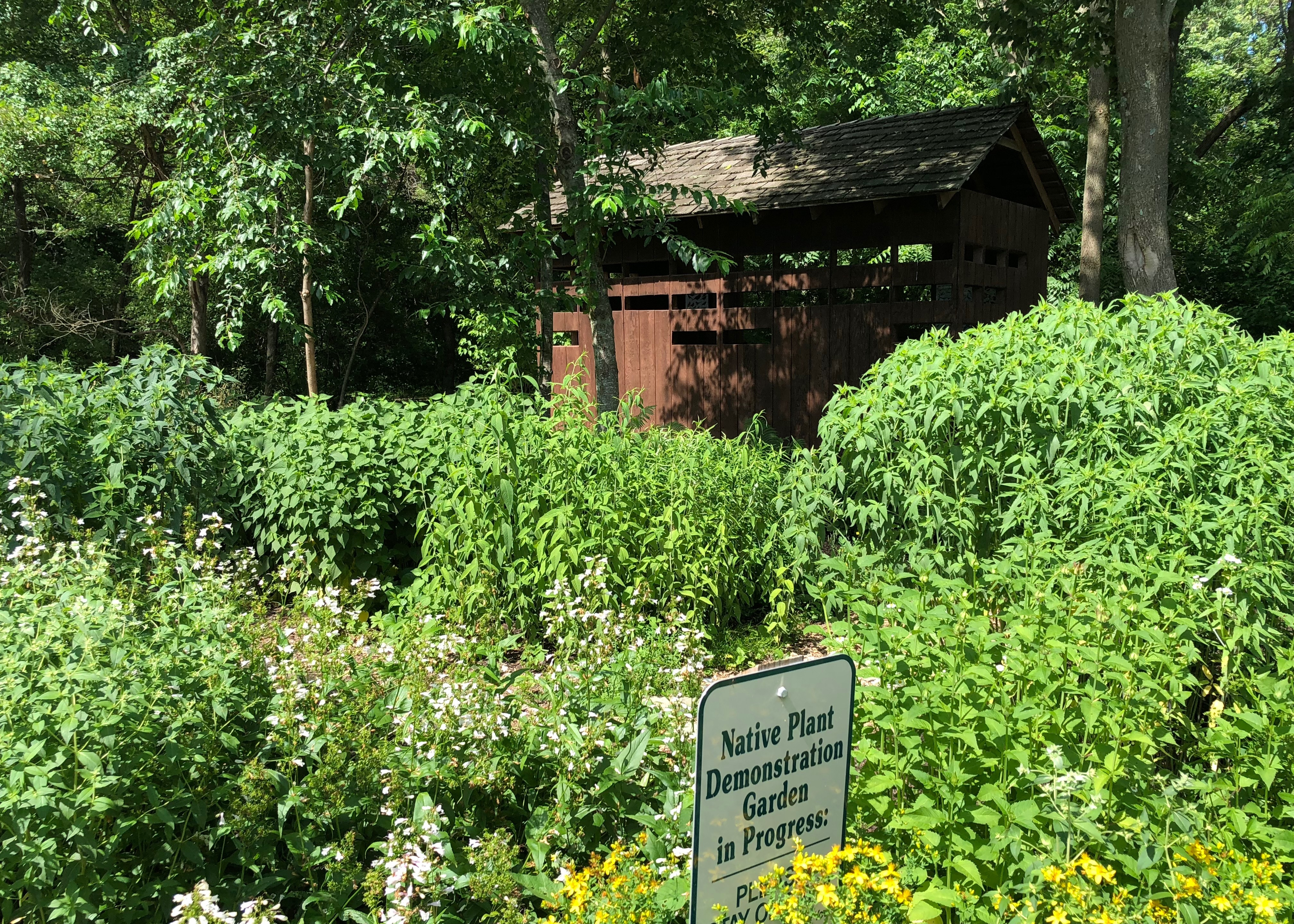
Doylestown Central Park Native Plant Garden and outdoor classroom

In 2004, Doylestown planned to acquire an additional 23 acres from the neighboring Doylestown Station Townhomes to become the new Environmental Education Area. As with the construction of the original park space, the goal was to limit the changes made to the original land features. The Environmental Education Area walking trail connects to the back of the Kid's Castle area, the adjacent neighborhood, as well as to the local Kutz Elementary School. Funding from Pulte, DCNR, and PECO Green Region Open Space Program allowed for the opening of the Environmental Education Area to be dedicated and opened as an official part of central park in 2006. A portion of the wetland education trail was completed in 2011. The Edgar N. Putman Environmental Education Center was dedicated on May 13, 2011. The invasive species trail was completed in January 2012.

Beyond regular park visitors, the Environmental Education Area is used by activities from programs such as: No Child Left Inside, park and recreation programs, and Environmental Advisory Council with the outdoor classroom acting as a hub for hosting these programs.

=== Invasive Species ===
Doylestown Central Park hopes to educate visitors on the damaging effects invasive species can have on existing habitats. Posted signage describes management techniques such as early detection, manual removal and chemical application, while also providing tips for visitors to help and apply on an individual scale. The posted solutions are: education, not planting invasive species in gardens, removal of invasive species, minimal landscape disturbance, limiting fertilizer use and monitoring. The following plants are known invasive species in Pennsylvania:

- Canada Thistle, Cirsium arvense
- Multiflora Rose, Rosa multiflora
- Johnson Grass, Sorghum halepense
- Kudzu, Pueraria lobata
- Purple Loofestrife, Lythrum salicaria
- Common Reed Grass, Phragmites australis

A more comprehensive list of invasive species can be located on the invasive species fact sheet on the Pennsylvania Department of Conservation and Natural Resources webpage.
