= Tabor Home for Needy and Destitute Children =

- U.S. National Register of Historic Places
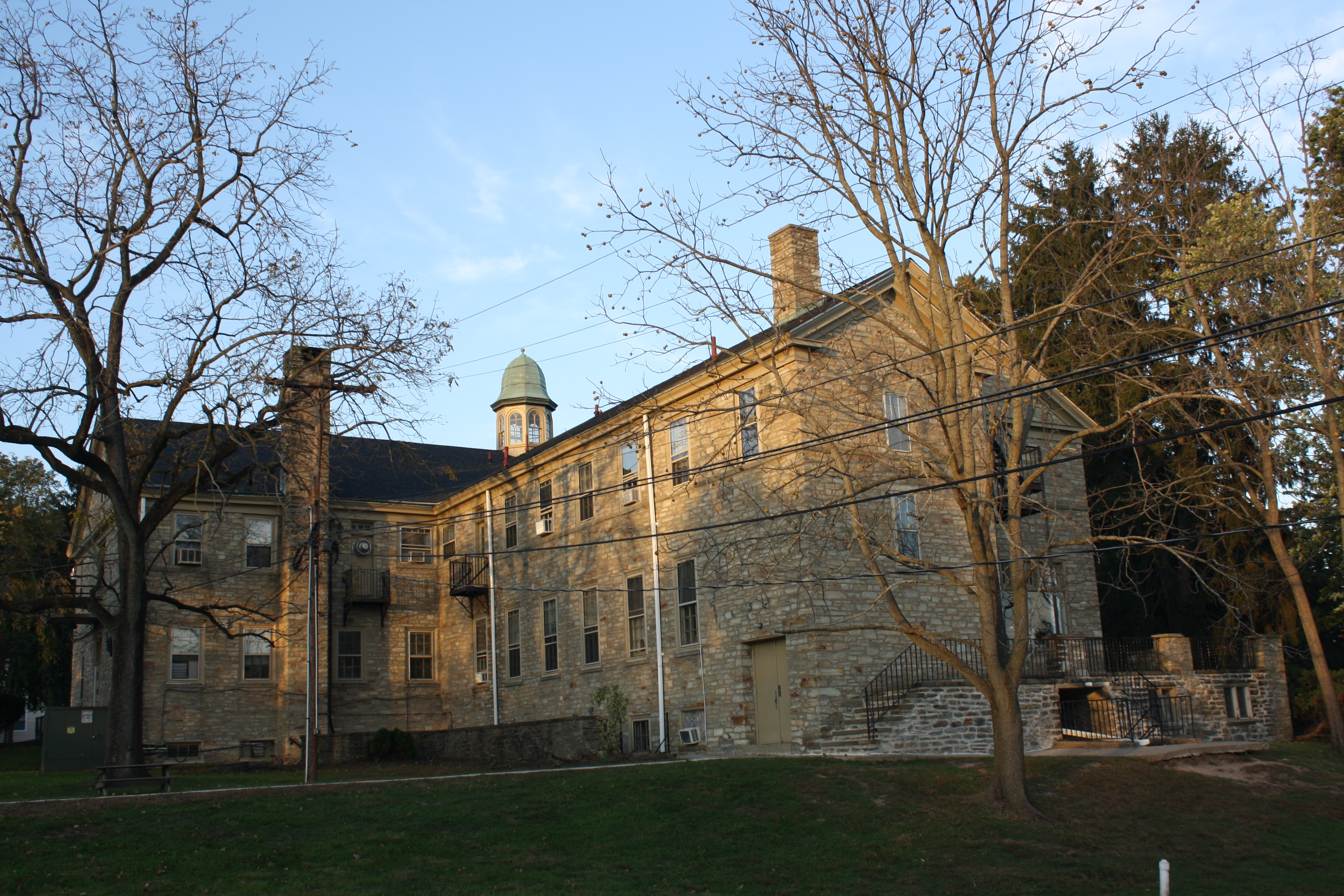
- Tabor Home for Needy and Destitute Children, October 2012

- Location within Pennsylvania Location within the United States
- Location: 601 New Britain Rd., Doylestown Township, Pennsylvania
- Coordinates: 40°17′32″N 75°7′47″W
- Area: 0.2 acres (0.081 ha)
- Built: 1879
- Architect: Cernea, Thomas
- Architectural style: Second Empire
- NRHP reference No.: 87001207
- Added to NRHP: July 16, 1987

The Tabor Home for Needy and Destitute Children, also known as the Philip H. Fretz Mansion, is a historic, American home that is located in Doylestown Township, Bucks County, Pennsylvania.

It was added to the National Register of Historic Places in 1987.

== History and architectural features ==
Built in 1879, this large, L-shaped, brownstone building was designed in the Second Empire style. It consists of a 2 1/2-story, five-bay main block with a mansard roof, a 2 1/2-story, hipped roof pavilion, and a 1 1/2-story, library wing. The front facade features a central three-story square tower.

It housed the Tabor Home for Needy and Destitute Children from 1913 to 1979,

The organization continues as Tabor Children's Services.
