= Delaware Valley University station =

Railway station in pennsylvania, US

Delaware Valley University
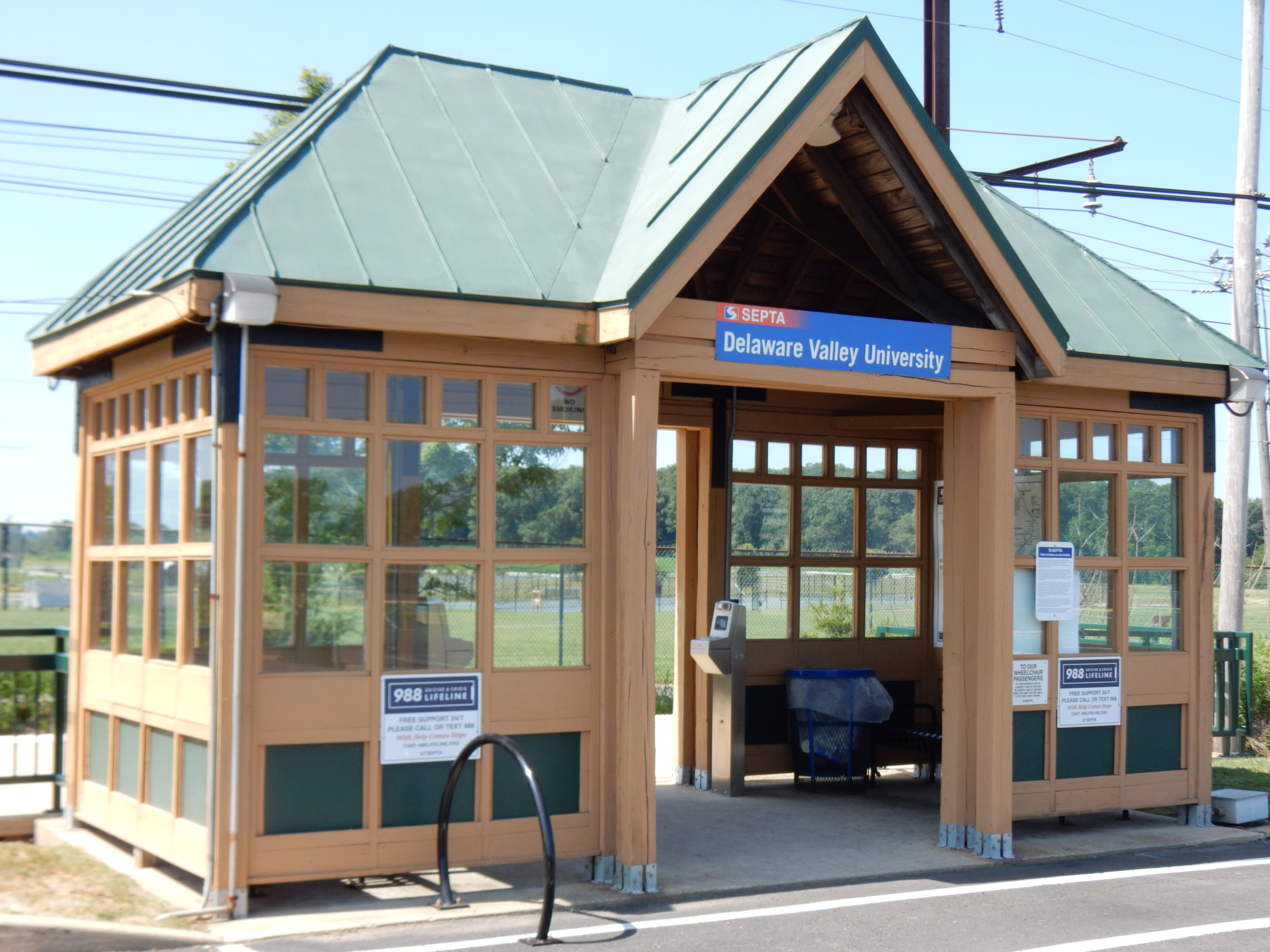
- DVU Station in 2025

General information
- Location: Delaware Valley University; 700 East Butler Avenue; Doylestown, Pennsylvania 18901, USA
- Coordinates: 40.2972°N 75.1617°W
- Owner: SEPTA
- Platforms: 1 side platform
- Tracks: 1
- Connections: BCT: Doylestown DART, DART West

Construction
- Parking: None
- Accessible: Yes

Other information
- Fare zone: 4

Services
Preceding station	SEPTA	Following station
New Britain toward Penn Medicine Station	Lansdale/Doylestown Line	Doylestown Terminus
Former services
Preceding station	Reading Railroad	Following station
New Britain toward Lansdale	Doylestown Branch	Doylestown Terminus
Location

Delaware Valley University station is a small station along the SEPTA Lansdale/Doylestown Line. It is located on the campus of Delaware Valley University, just off of U.S. Route 202. This stop is often referred to as "Del Val". It was originally named Farm School by the Reading Company until the 1960s, reflecting the college's original name of National Farm School. The station was called Delaware Valley College station until the university changed its name in 2015. In FY 2013, the station had a weekday average of 68 boardings and 70 alightings. A small-scale improvement project is in the planning to help beautify the station; if approved, hanging flower baskets, new paint and directory signs would be added to the structure. This station is wheelchair accessible.
