= New Britain, Pennsylvania =

Borough in Pennsylvania, US

- Borough
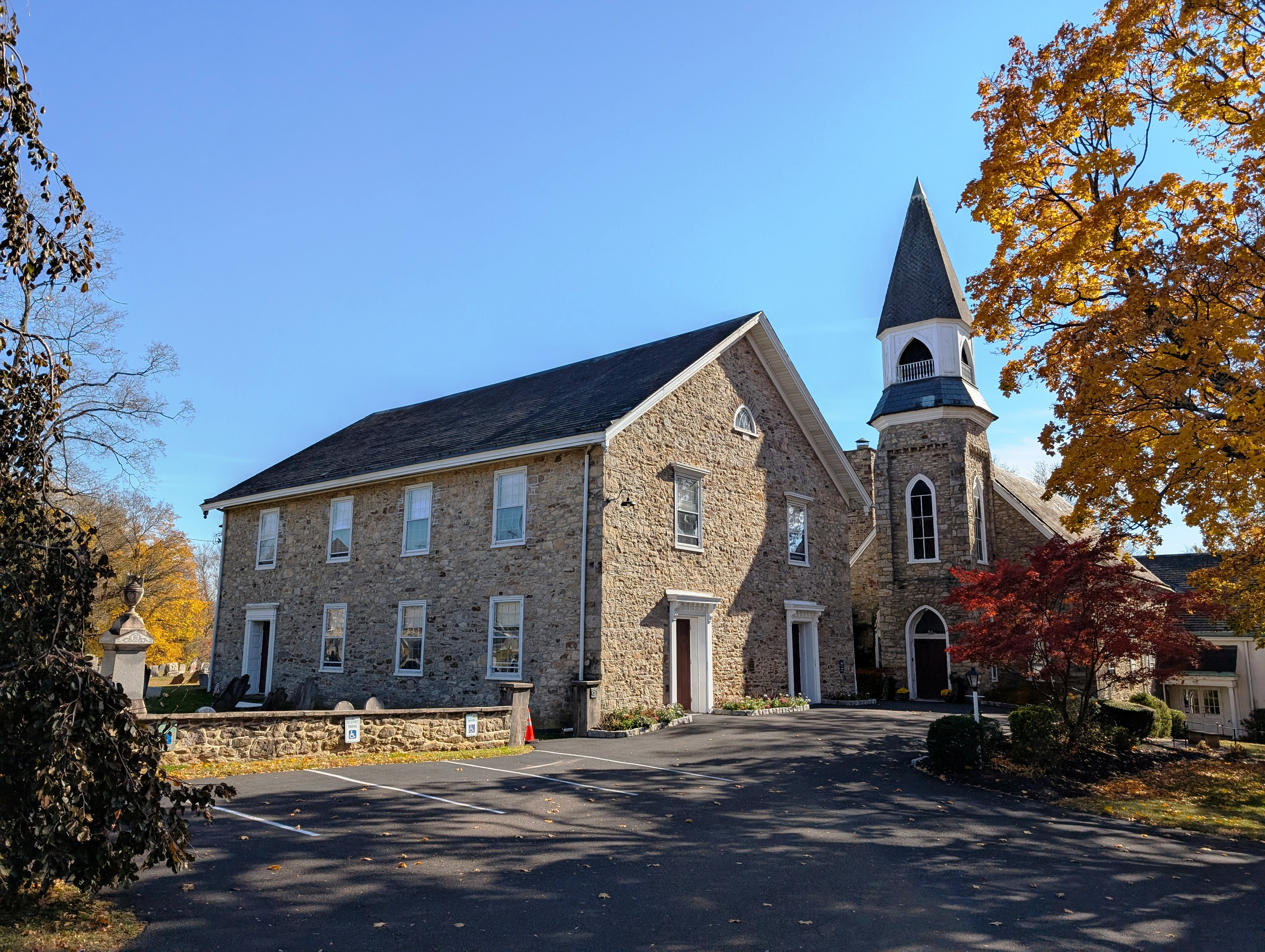
- New Britain Baptist Church, the center of the Borough

- Seal
- Motto: "A Friendly Place to Live"
- Location of New Britain in Bucks County, Pennsylvania

- Location in Pennsylvania Location in the United States
- Coordinates: 40°17′57″N 75°10′42″W
- Country: United States
- State: Pennsylvania
- County: Bucks
- Established: 1928

Government
  - Body: Borough Council
  - Mayor: James Donovan

Area
  - Total: 1.21 sq mi (3.13 km^{2})
  - Land: 1.21 sq mi (3.13 km^{2})
  - Water: 0.0039 sq mi (0.01 km^{2})
- Elevation: 276 ft (84 m)

Population (2020)
  - Total: 2,836
  - Density: 2,349/sq mi (907.1/km^{2})
- Time zone: UTC-5 (Eastern (EST))
  - Summer (DST): UTC-4 (EDT)
- ZIP Code: 18901
- Area codes: 215, 267 and 445
- FIPS code: 42-53296
- Website: www.newbritainboro.com

New Britain is a borough in Bucks County, Pennsylvania, United States. The population was 2,836 at the 2020 census, a decrease from the figure of 3,152 tabulated in 2010.

== Geography ==
Natural features include Cooks Run and Neshaminy Creek.

According to the United States Census Bureau, the borough has a total area of 1.3 square miles (3.4 km^{2}), all land.

== History ==
Eugene James built an estate about 1731 and included the Mathews homestead, a fine Colonial house built in 1744 upon the site of an earlier house destroyed by fire. The village of James Manor was begun on the estate by Wynne James. Nearby villages were Jamestown, New Britain and Vauxtown. The National Farm School, now the Delaware Valley University was built near James Manor.

The Sign of the Horses and Wagon was a tavern in the west end of the village, where Lafayette headquartered at the time. The Continental Army marched from Valley Forge to Monmouth, New Jersey.

The first dwelling in the village of New Britain was built at the intersection of West Butler Avenue (U.S. Route 202) and Almshouse Road by David Stephens, who purchased land from Joseph Kirkbride, sometime before 1760.

Early on, the village was called Bittings Store or Bittings Corner for a short time. Most of the people living in village were members of the Montgomery Baptist Church. About 1740 they separated from Montgomery calling their church the Society Meeting House, the first pastors William Davis, Joseph Eaton, and Joshua Jones. By 1813, the name was changed to the New Britain Baptist Church.

The North Pennsylvania Railroad station was opened in 1856, the name on the sign at the station was "New Brittain". A post office was established on 28 December 1829, Isaac W. James, postmaster. New Britain was incorporated as a borough on 21 May 1928 taking in the villages of James Manor, Jamestown, New Britain, and a part of Vauxtown.

New Britain was entered into the Geographic Names Information System on August 30, 1999 as identification 1214971.

== Demographics ==
Historical population
Census	Pop.	Note	%±
1880	119		—
1930	417		—
1940	476		14.1%
1950	581		22.1%
1960	1,109		90.9%
1970	2,428		118.9%
1980	2,519		3.7%
1990	2,174		−13.7%
2000	3,125		43.7%
2010	3,152		0.9%
2020	2,836		−10.0%

As of the 2010 census, the borough was 92.7% White, 1.6% Black or African American, 0.2% Native American, 1.3% Asian, 0.2% Native Hawaiian or Other Pacific Islander, and 1.1% were two or more races. 2.7% of the population were of Hispanic or Latino ancestry.

As of the census of 2000, there were 3,125 people, 912 households, and 670 families residing in the borough. The population density was 2,454.1 inhabitants per square mile (947.5/km^{2}). There were 930 housing units at an average density of 730.3 per square mile (282.0/km^{2}). The racial makeup of the borough was 95.87% White, 2.05% African American, 0.06% Native American, 0.80% Asian, 0.03% Pacific Islander, 0.26% from other races, and 0.93% from two or more races. Hispanic or Latino of any race were 1.63% of the population.

There were 912 households, out of which 32.7% had children under the age of 18 living with them, 60.9% were married couples living together, 10.1% had a female householder with no husband present, and 26.5% were non-families. 22.4% of all households were made up of individuals, and 7.1% had someone living alone who was 65 years of age or older. The average household size was 2.58 and the average family size was 3.01.

In the borough the population was spread out, with 18.6% under the age of 18, 29.0% from 18 to 24, 23.3% from 25 to 44, 20.1% from 45 to 64, and 9.2% who were 65 years of age or older. The median age was 28 years. For every 100 females there were 89.7 males. For every 100 females age 18 and over, there were 88.0 males.

The median income for a household in the borough was $60,029, and the median income for a family was $67,500. Males had a median income of $45,875 versus $28,942 for females. The per capita income for the borough was $20,877. About 1.6% of families and 2.7% of the population were below the poverty line, including 1.6% of those under age 18 and 4.7% of those age 65 or over.

== Climate ==
According to the Köppen climate classification system, New Britain has a Hot-summer, Humid continental climate (Dfa). Dfa climates are characterized by at least one month having an average mean temperature ≤ 32.0 °F (0.0 °C), at least four months with an average mean temperature ≥ 50.0 °F (10.0 °C), at least one month with an average mean temperature ≥ 71.6 °F (22.0 °C) and no significant precipitation difference between seasons. Although most summer days are slightly humid in New Britain, episodes of heat and high humidity can occur with heat index values > 106 °F (41 °C). Since 1981, the highest air temperature was 102.7 °F (39.3 °C) on 07/22/2011, and the highest daily average mean dew point was 74.9 °F (23.8 °C) on 08/12/2016. The average wettest month is July which corresponds with the annual peak in thunderstorm activity. Since 1981, the wettest calendar day was 6.93 inches (176 mm) on 09/16/1999. During the winter months, the average annual extreme minimum air temperature is −0.6 °F (−18.1 °C). Since 1981, the coldest air temperature was −12.1 °F (−24.5 °C) on 01/22/1984. Episodes of extreme cold and wind can occur with wind chill values < −11 °F (−24 °C). The average annual snowfall (Nov-Apr) is between 30 inches (76 cm) and 36 inches (91 cm). Ice storms and large snowstorms depositing ≥ 12 inches (30 cm) of snow occur once every few years, particularly during nor’easters from December through February.

Climate data for New Britain, Elevation 289 ft (88 m), 1981-2010 normals, extremes 1981-2018
Month	Jan	Feb	Mar	Apr	May	Jun	Jul	Aug	Sep	Oct	Nov	Dec	Year
Record high °F (°C)	70.9 (21.6)	77.9 (25.5)	86.9 (30.5)	93.8 (34.3)	94.7 (34.8)	95.7 (35.4)	102.7 (39.3)	99.6 (37.6)	97.4 (36.3)	89.2 (31.8)	80.8 (27.1)	75.2 (24.0)	102.7 (39.3)
Mean daily maximum °F (°C)	39.2 (4.0)	42.4 (5.8)	50.8 (10.4)	62.8 (17.1)	72.8 (22.7)	81.6 (27.6)	85.7 (29.8)	84.0 (28.9)	77.1 (25.1)	65.7 (18.7)	54.7 (12.6)	43.3 (6.3)	63.4 (17.4)
Daily mean °F (°C)	30.4 (−0.9)	33.2 (0.7)	40.9 (4.9)	51.6 (10.9)	61.3 (16.3)	70.5 (21.4)	75.0 (23.9)	73.5 (23.1)	66.1 (18.9)	54.3 (12.4)	44.7 (7.1)	34.8 (1.6)	53.1 (11.7)
Mean daily minimum °F (°C)	21.7 (−5.7)	24.1 (−4.4)	30.9 (−0.6)	40.4 (4.7)	49.8 (9.9)	59.4 (15.2)	64.3 (17.9)	62.9 (17.2)	55.1 (12.8)	42.9 (6.1)	34.7 (1.5)	26.3 (−3.2)	42.8 (6.0)
Record low °F (°C)	−12.1 (−24.5)	−4.4 (−20.2)	2.4 (−16.4)	16.5 (−8.6)	32.8 (0.4)	40.6 (4.8)	47.2 (8.4)	41.9 (5.5)	34.7 (1.5)	23.4 (−4.8)	10.9 (−11.7)	−2.8 (−19.3)	−12.1 (−24.5)
Average precipitation inches (mm)	3.24 (82)	2.63 (67)	3.72 (94)	3.92 (100)	4.34 (110)	4.30 (109)	4.97 (126)	4.05 (103)	4.46 (113)	4.21 (107)	3.63 (92)	3.91 (99)	47.38 (1,203)
Average relative humidity (%)	66.6	63.4	58.8	58.0	62.3	67.2	67.5	69.7	71.2	70.2	68.9	68.5	66.0
Average dew point °F (°C)	20.6 (−6.3)	22.1 (−5.5)	27.6 (−2.4)	37.3 (2.9)	48.3 (9.1)	59.1 (15.1)	63.5 (17.5)	63.0 (17.2)	56.5 (13.6)	44.8 (7.1)	35.1 (1.7)	25.5 (−3.6)	42.0 (5.6)
Source: PRISM

== Transportation ==
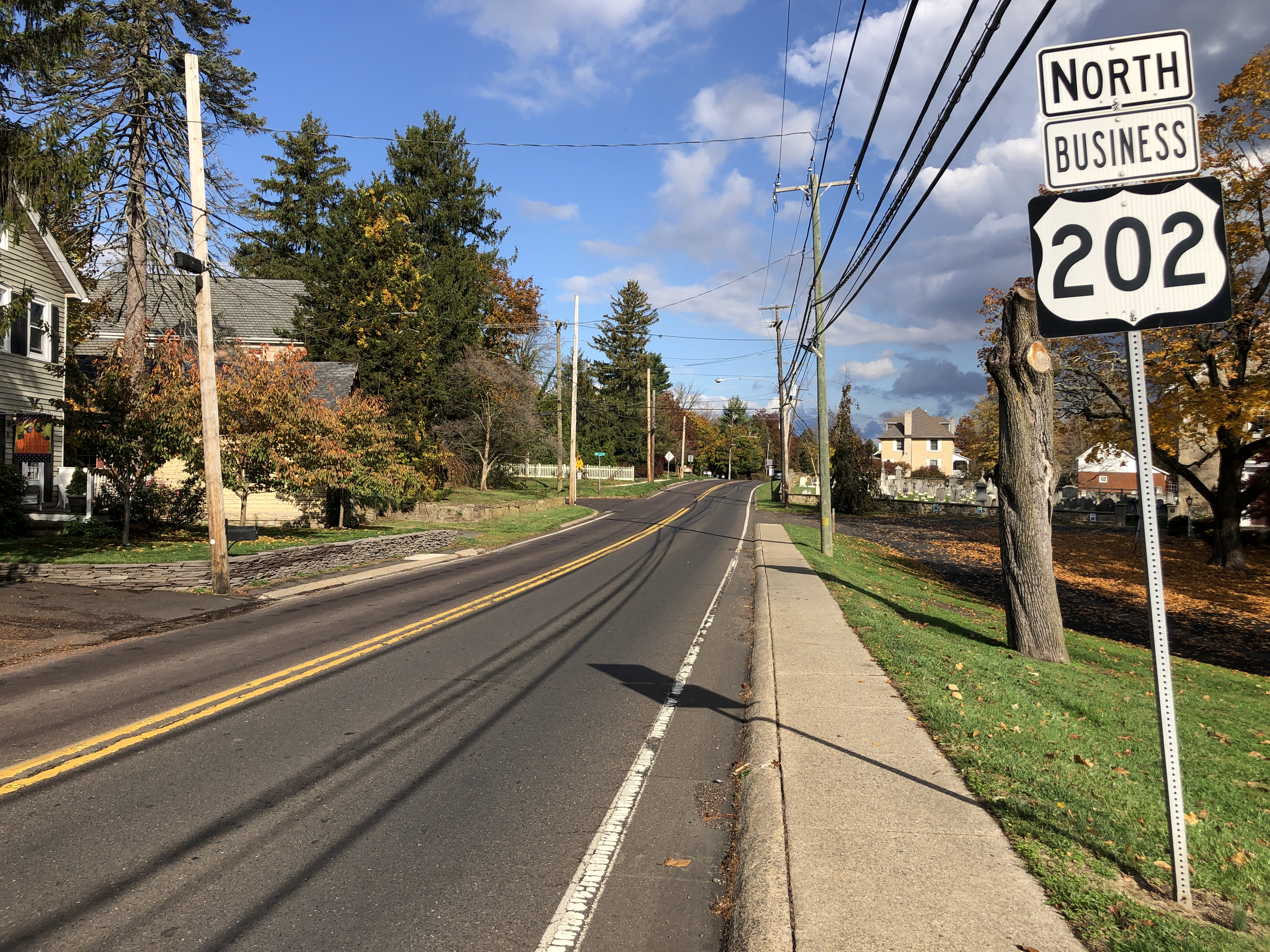
US 202 Business northbound in New Britain

As of 2018 there were 12.30 miles (19.79 km) of public roads in New Britain, of which 3.23 miles (5.20 km) were maintained by the Pennsylvania Department of Transportation (PennDOT) and 9.07 miles (14.60 km) were maintained by the borough.

U.S. Route 202 Business is the only numbered highway traversing New Britain. It follows a southwest-northeast alignment along Butler Avenue.

New Britain is served by the New Britain station on SEPTA Regional Rail's Lansdale/Doylestown Line, which provides service to Doylestown and Center City Philadelphia. Bucks County Transport operates the DART West bus that serves New Britain, which runs weekdays from Chalfont to a connection with the Doylestown DART bus to Doylestown at Delaware Valley University.

== Ecology ==
According to the A. W. Kuchler U.S. potential natural vegetation types, New Britain would have a dominant vegetation type of Appalachian Oak (104) with a dominant vegetation form of Eastern Hardwood Forest (25). The plant hardiness zone is 6b with an average annual extreme minimum air temperature of −0.6 °F (−18.1 °C). The spring bloom typically begins by April 11 and fall color usually peaks by October 30.

== Education ==
New Britain is in the Central Bucks School District. Pine Run Elementary School is in the New Britain borough limits. It feeds into Tohickon Middle School and Central Bucks West High School.

A portion of the grounds of Delaware Valley University is in New Britain Borough.

== Notable people ==
- Samuel Aaron was an American educator and Baptist minister.
