= Bennetts Corner, Pennsylvania =

Bennetts Corner
- Populated place
- Bennetts Corner, Doylestown Township Bennetts Corner (the United States)
- Coordinates: 40°17′23″N 75°6′2″W
- Country: United States
- State: Pennsylvania
- County: Bucks
- Elevation: 217 ft (66 m)
- Time zone: UTC-5 (EST)
  - Summer (DST): UTC-4 (EDT)
- ZIP code: 18901
- Area codes: 215, 267, 445

Bennetts Corner is a populated place in Doylestown Township, Bucks County, Pennsylvania, Bucks County, Pennsylvania at the intersection of Edison Furlong Road and Pebble Hill Road about 2 miles (3.2 km) southeast of Doylestown.

== History ==
Bennetts Corner was named from the Bennett family who owned land in the area prior to 1870, and has been known by this name since the mid-1800s.

== Geography and statistics ==
Bennetts Corner was entered into the Geographic Names Information System on 2 August 1979 as identification number 1203065, its elevation is listed as 217 feet (66 m). An unnamed tributary of the Neshaminy Creek, part of the Delaware River watershed runs through the village. It is located in the Doylestown (18901) Zip code, and the telephone Area codes 215, 267, and 445.
