= Pennsylvania Impressionism =

Impressionist art movement

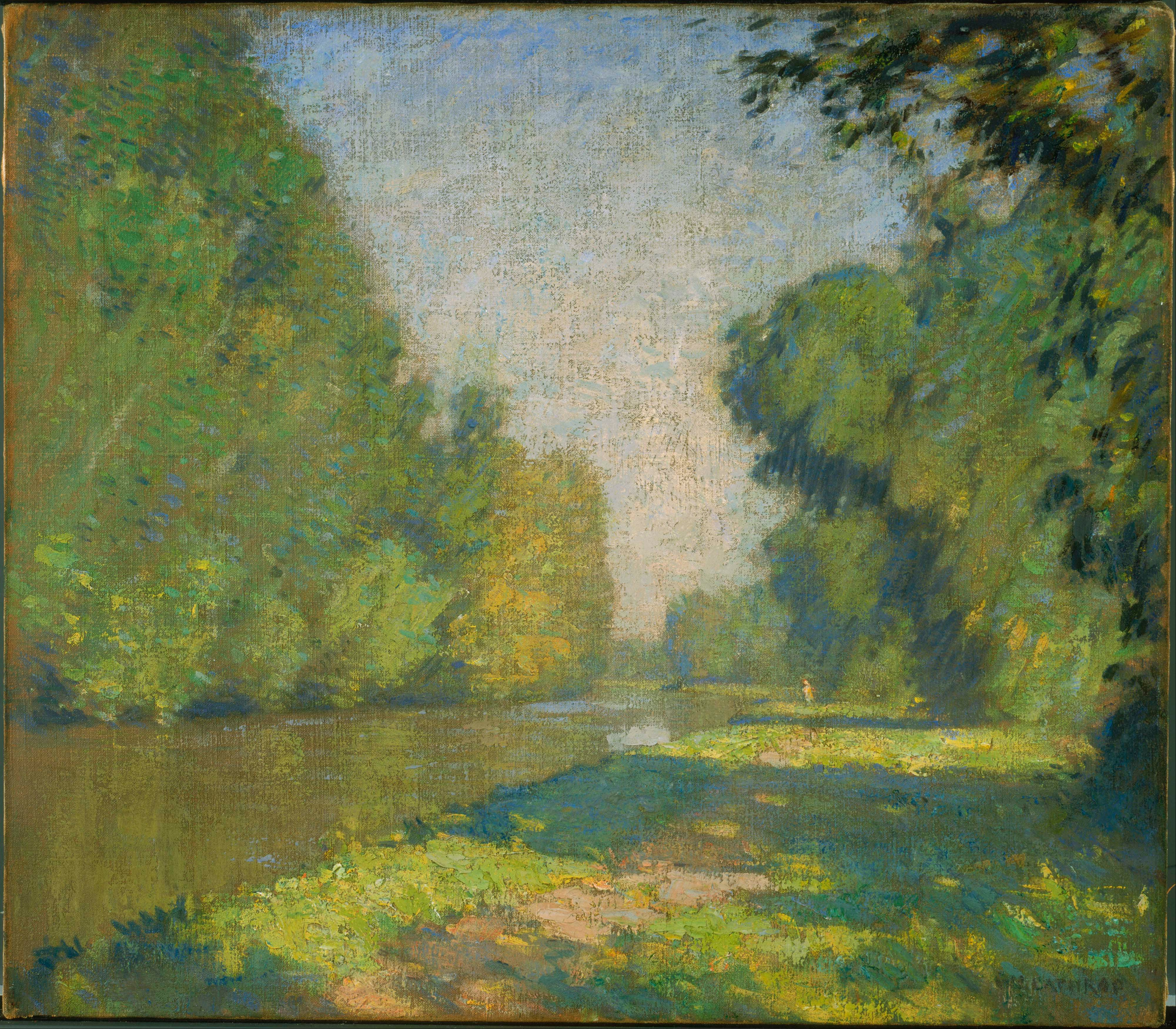
The Tow Path, a 1921 Pennsylvania impressionist painting by William Langson Lathrop now on display at the Phillips Collection in Washington, D.C.

Pennsylvania Impressionism was an American Impressionist movement of the first half of the 20th century that was centered in and around Bucks County, Pennsylvania, particularly the town of New Hope. The movement is sometimes referred to as the "New Hope School" or the "Pennsylvania School" of landscape painting.

== Beginnings ==
Landscape painter William Langson Lathrop (1859–1938) moved to New Hope in 1898, where he founded a summer art school. The mill town was located along the Delaware River, about forty miles from Philadelphia and seventy miles from Manhattan. The area's rolling hills were spectacular, and the river, its tributaries, and the Delaware Canal were picturesque. The natural beauty attracted the artist Edward Redfield (1869–1965), who settled north of the town. Redfield painted nature in bold and vibrant colors, and was a pioneer of the realistic painting of winter in America.

Lathrop's thick layering distinguished him from his contemporaries, and he amassed more honors and awards than any other artist in the New Hope colony. His style is distinguished by its color, light, and usual time of day when painting. The third major artist to settle in the area was Daniel Garber (1880–1958), who came to New Hope in 1907. Garber hated painting winter scenes and applied his paint lightly. He was an instructor at the Pennsylvania Academy of the Fine Arts in Philadelphia and popularized rain paintings.

== Artist colony ==
As more artists came to the colony, the artists formed art groups with different ideas. The two main groups were the Impressionists and the Modernists. The Pennsylvania Impressionists, a key movement in American Impressionism, influenced major artists such as Walter Schofield (1867–1944), George Sotter (1879–1953) and Henry Snell (1858–1943). William Langson Lathrop purchased the Phillips Mill property to use as a venue to hold galleries and exhibitions. Modernist Lloyd R. Ney submitted a painting of the New Hope canal. Lathrop threatened to reject the painting because the colors were too disturbing. Charles Ramsey, Lloyd Ney's good friend, was disturbed by this comment and formed the “New Group.” This group rebelled against the traditional impressionists, hosting its inaugural show the day before the Phillips Mill Exhibition on May 16, 1930.

Many years later, a flood of artists came to Pennsylvania because of Garber's influence. This group included artists such as Robert A. Darrah Miller (1905–1966), Peter Keenan (1896–1952), Charles Evans (1907–1992), Henry Baker (1900–1957), Richard Wedderspoon (1889–1976), Carl Lindborg (1903–1994), Frederick Harer (1879–1947), Faye Swengel Badura (1904–1991), Louis Stone (1902–1984), and Charles Ward (1900–1962). Other important modernist painters to later settle in the area after the initial arrivals were Josef Zenk (1904–2000), Bror Julius Olsson Nordfeldt (1878–1955), Swiss–born Joseph Meierhans (1890–1980), Clarence Carter (1904–2000), and Richard Peter Hoffman (1911–1997).

Finally, there were the “Last Ten." These ten women artists consisted of Fern Coppedge (1883–1951) and Mary Elizabeth Price (1877–1965) from New Hope, as well as Nancy Maybin Ferguson (1869–1967), Emma Fordyce MacRae (1887–1974), Eleanor Abrams (1885–1967), Constance Cochrane (1888–1962), and Theresa Bernstein (1890–2002). These women influenced many other women to join the Pennsylvania Impressionism movement.

Similar to the French impressionist movement, Pennsylvania Impressionist art was characterized by an interest in the quality of color, light, and the time of day. This group of artists usually painted en plein air (outdoors) to capture the moment. According to the James A. Michener Art Museum’s senior curator Brian Peterson, “what most characterized Pennsylvania impressionism was not a single, unified style but rather the emergence of many mature, distinctive voices: Daniel Garber's luminous, poetic renditions of the Delaware River; Fern Coppedge's colorful village scenes; Robert Spencer's lyrical views of mills and tenements; John Folinsbee's moody, expressionistic snowscapes; and William L. Lathrop's deeply felt, evocative Bucks County vistas."

Art historian Thomas C. Folk defines the movement as the Late Pennsylvania School, those artists that "came to prominence in Bucks County after 1915 or after the Armory Show and the Panama–Pacific International Exposition." According to Folk, the three most notable artists in this group were John Fulton Folinsbee, Walter Emerson Baum and George Sotter.

One of the artists, Walter Emerson Baum, worked as a teacher and educator and through his founding of the Baum School of Art and the Allentown Art Museum, would serve to expand the influence of the movement out of Bucks County and into Lehigh County, specifically Allentown and the Lehigh Valley, where the movement continued to flourish into the 1940s and 1950s. Today, this group of artists is collectively known as the Baum Circle.

== Associated painters ==
Pennsylvania Impressionist painters include:

- Eleanor Abrams
- Walter Emerson Baum
- Theresa Bernstein
- Rae Sloan Bredin
- Constance Cochrane
- Morgan Colt
- Fern Coppedge
- Nate Dunn
- Nancy Maybin Ferguson
- John Fulton Folinsbee
- Daniel Garber
- Frederick Harer
- L. Birge Harrison
- John Wells James
- William Langson Lathrop
- Harry Leith–Ross
- Emma Fordyce MacRae
- Roy Cleveland Nuse
- Mary Elizabeth Price
- Herbert Pullinger
- Edward Redfield
- Charles Rosen
- Walter Elmer Schofield
- Henry B. Snell
- George Sotter
- Robert Spencer (artist)
- Mary Perkins Taylor

== See also ==
- American Impressionism
- Brandywine School
- Impressionism
