= Ruth Baldwin =

Ruth Baldwin may refer to:

- Ruth Bowyer (1761–1788), English convict sent to Australia, also known as Ruth Baldwin
- Ruth Ann Baldwin (1886–?), American silent film writer and director
- Ruth Baldwin (socialite) (1905–1937), American-born English socialite
- Ruth Standish Baldwin (1865–1934), co-founder of the National Urban League
- Ruth M. Baldwin, book collector who founded the Baldwin Library of Historical Children's Literature
