= Harry Leith-Ross =

British-American painter

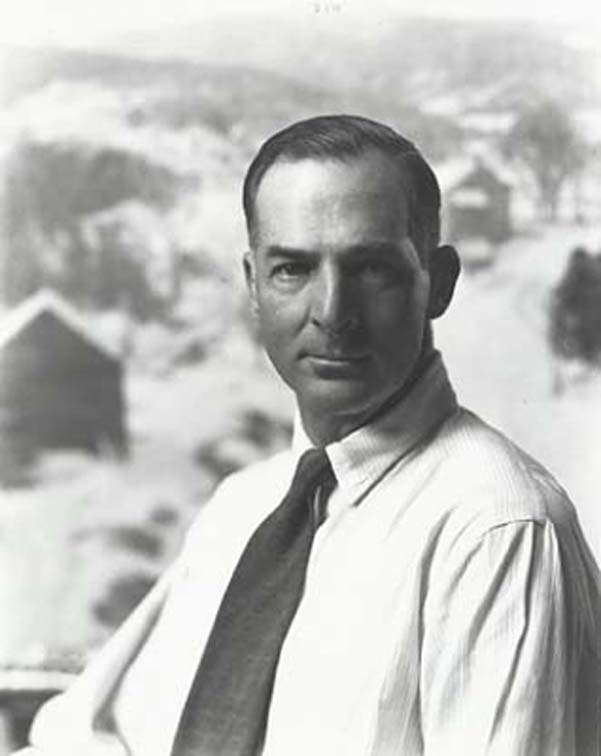
- Harry Leith-Ross, c.1937
- Born: January 27, 1886; Saint Pierre, Mauritius
- Died: March 1, 1973 (aged 87); Pineville, Pennsylvania
- Education: University of Birmingham; Académie Julian; National Academy of Design School
- Alma mater: Académie Delécluse
- Known for: Landscape painter
- Movement: Pennsylvania Impressionists
- Spouse: Emily Slaymaker

Harry "Tony" Leith-Ross (27 January 1886 – 15 March 1973) was a British-American landscape painter, teacher and author. He taught at the art colonies in Woodstock, New York and Rockport, Massachusetts, and later was part of the art colony in New Hope, Pennsylvania. A precise draftsman and a superb colorist, Leith-Ross is considered one of the Pennsylvania Impressionists.

== Life and career ==
Harry Leith-Ross was born in Saint Pierre, Mauritius – an island and British Colony in the South Indian Ocean – the son of banker Frederick William Arbuthnot Leith-Ross and Sina van Houten. His mother was the daughter of Dutch politician Samuel van Houten. His younger brother was Scottish economist Sir Frederick Leith-Ross.

Leith-Ross was educated in England and Scotland, and studied engineering at the University of Birmingham for a year. He emigrated to the United States at age 17 in 1903, and worked for his uncle's coal company. He subsequently took up advertising work in Denver, Colorado. He moved to Paris in 1909, and studied art at the Académie Delécluse and the Académie Julian. Beginning in 1910, he studied in New York City at the National Academy of Design School under Charles Yardley Turner.

The Art Students League of New York operated a summer painting school in Woodstock, New York, which Leith-Ross first attended in 1913. His instructors included Birge Harrison and John F. Carlson. It was there that he met fellow student John Fulton Folinsbee, who would become his life-long friend. Folinsbee had contracted polio as a child and relied on a wheelchair. The two men shared a cabin, and Leith-Ross would carry Folinsbee piggyback around the countryside to sketch and paint outdoors.

Birge Harrison "took Harry Leith-Ross and Folinsbee to the heart of his family in the winter of 1913-1914 at Bearsville, above Woodstock." The two students painted during the day, and the teacher evaluated their work each night. Folinsbee: "Harrison was a flaming light and a constant source of encouragement."

Leith-Ross and Folinsbee served as best man for each other's wedding. Folinsbee married in 1914, and he and his wife settled in New Hope, Pennsylvania in 1916, where Leith-Ross was a frequent houseguest. Both men painted en plein air, directly from nature. They were famous for spending afternoons sketching on the bridge at New Hope (and for tossing anything that displeased them into the Delaware River).

Leith-Ross served as a second lieutenant in the United States Army during World War I.

After the war, Leith-Ross taught at the University of Buffalo, and at the summer art school in Rockport, Massachusetts, where he taught for decades. He met student Emily Slaymaker in Summer 1925, and they were married later that year. They lived in Woodstock, New York for a decade, then settled outside New Hope, Pennsylvania in 1935. They had one daughter, Elizabeth Leith-Ross Mow (1927 - 2026), of Albany, New York.

Leith-Ross wrote a well-regarded book on landscape painting: Leith-Ross, Harry (1956). The Landscape Painter's Manual. New York: Watson-Guptill Publications. OCLC 1325646.

Leith-Ross died in 1973 in Pineville, Pennsylvania.

=== Exhibitions, awards and honors ===
The Toledo Museum of Art hosted a joint exhibition of paintings by Leith-Ross and Folinsbee in November 1915. The Memorial Art Gallery in Rochester, New York, hosted a joint exhibition of paintings by Martha Walter, William J. Potter, and Leith-Ross in February 1921.

Leith-Ross exhibited in the annual exhibitions at the Art Institute of Chicago from 1914 to 1937, at the National Academy of Design most years from 1915 to 1950, and at the Pennsylvania Academy of the Fine Arts most years from 1916 to 1952. He exhibited at the Corcoran Gallery of Art from 1919 to 1947, at the New Haven Paint & Clay Club from 1920 to 1942, and at the Carnegie Institute from 1943 to 1948. Leith-Ross participated in the Metropolitan Museum of Art's World War II exhibition Artists for Victory (1942).

Leith-Ross won prizes from the Salmagundi Club and the American Watercolor Society.

Leith-Ross was elected an Associate of the National Academy of Design in 1928, and a full Academician in 1936. Folinsbee painted Leith-Ross's NAD diploma portrait.

=== Legacy ===
Leith-Ross expressed his philosophy about painting in The Landscape Painter's Manual (1956), Watson Guptill Publications.

His works are in the permanent collections of the James A. Michener Art Museum, the Woodmere Art Museum, the Smithsonian American Art Museum, and many private collections.

Leith-Ross's papers are at the University of Pennsylvania.

The Michener Museum hosted a posthumous exhibition of his works: Poetry in Design: The Art of Harry Leith-Ross (October 2006 - March 2007).

Leith-Ross's Connecticut Valley in Fall was appraised on Antiques Roadshow in 2017.

== Selected works ==
- The Bridge at New Hope (ca. 1915-18), private collection
- Nova Scotia Cove (1923), Salmagundi Club of New York
- Sunlight on Snow (1927), Thomas Colville Fine Art, Guilford, Connecticut
- Feeding Cattle, Winter (1927), National Academy of Design, New York City.
  - Winner of NAD's 1927 Ranger Fund Purchase Prize.
- Coal Barge (c.1933), National Academy of Design Museum, New York City.
- The River Road (1934), William Benton Museum of Art, University of Connecticut.
- The Log Team (1934), William Benton Museum of Art, University of Connecticut.
- The Big Spring Road (1934), William Benton Museum of Art, University of Connecticut.
  - The above three paintings were among 12 works painted by Leith-Ross for the Connecticut Forestry Department in 1934.
- Lone Skater (c.1943), Woodmere Art Museum, Philadelphia, Pennsylvania.
  - Winner of the Woodmere Art Gallery's 1944 Purchase Prize.
- Stone House (1944), Salmagundi Club of New York
- Flag Station (1945), Pennsylvania Academy of the Fine Arts, Philadelphia, Pennsylvania.
  - Winner of the Salmagundi Club's 1946 Special Exhibition Prize.
- The Sleigh (c.1945), from Heritage Auctions. private collection
- Soldier's Grave (1948), private collection.
  - Winner of the Woodmere Art Gallery's 1949 Woodmere Prize.
- Demolition (1954), Smithsonian American Art Museum, Washington, D.C.
  - Winner of the National Academy of Design's 1955 Morse Gold Medal.
- The Fair (1958), Woodmere Art Museum, Philadelphia, Pennsylvania
- Red Barn (undated), James A. Michener Art Museum, Doylestown, Pennsylvania
- Canal Dwellers (undated), Woodmere Art Museum, Philadelphia, Pennsylvania
