= Roy Cleveland Nuse =

American academic and painter (1885–1975)

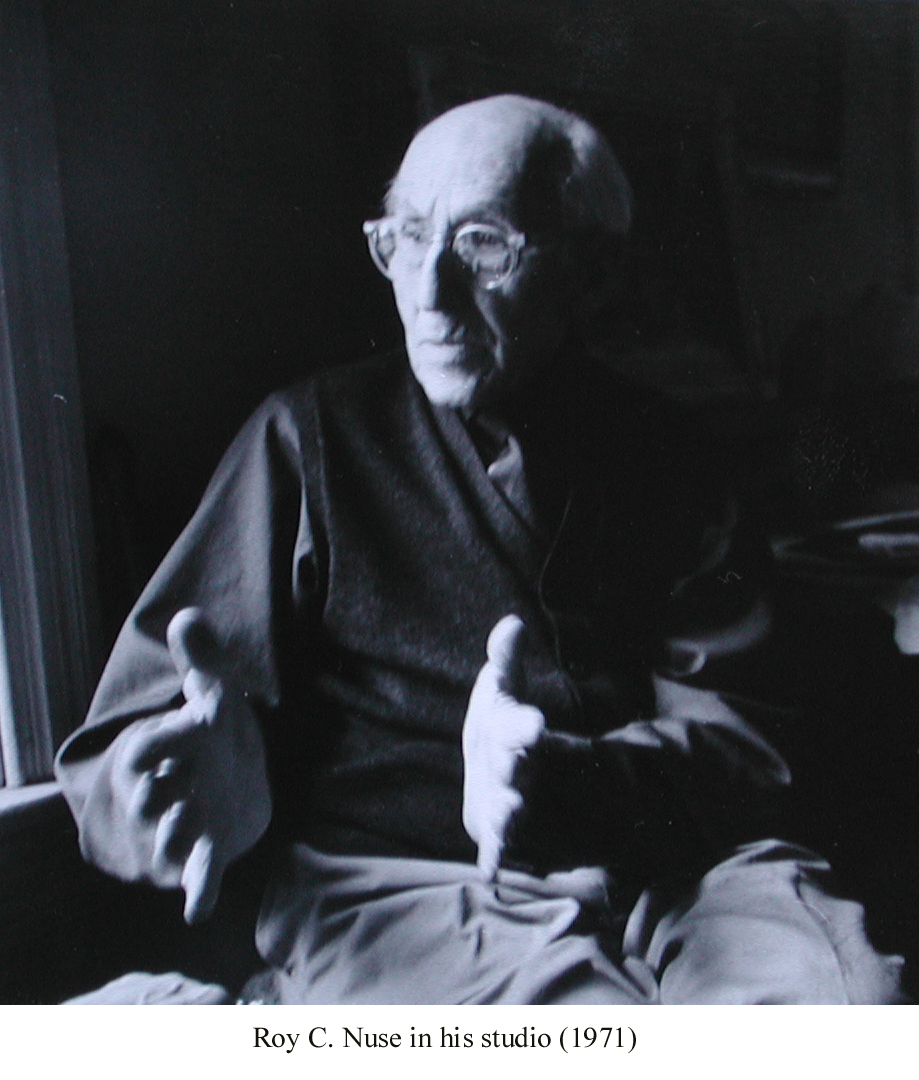
- Nuse in his studio, 1971
- Born: 1885; Springfield, Ohio, United States
- Died: January 25, 1975 (aged 89–90); Rushland, Pennsylvania, United States
- Education: Art Academy of Cincinnati, Pennsylvania Academy of Fine Arts
- Occupations: Painter, teacher, curator
- Movement: Pennsylvania Impressionism
- Website: www.royclevelandnuse.com

Roy Cleveland Nuse (1885–1975) was an American painter, curator, and a teacher, associated with Pennsylvania Impressionism. He taught at the Pennsylvania Academy of the Fine Arts (PAFA) in Philadelphia, from 1925 to 1954.

For almost 60 years he lived and painted in Bucks County, Pennsylvania, working in a plein-air, impressionist style. His six children were often the subjects of his paintings, depicted especially in rural, outdoor settings. Working primarily in oils, but also in pastels, Nuse painted landscapes, figures in the landscape, still lifes and portraits.

== Early life and education ==
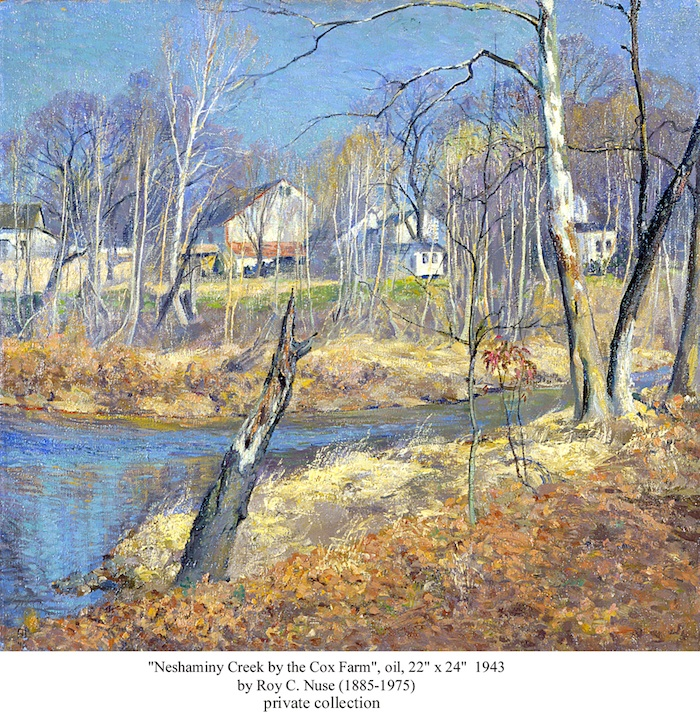
"Neshaminy Creek by the Cox Farm", Roy C. Nuse, oil, 1943

Roy Cleveland Nuse was born in 1885, in Springfield, Ohio. Nuse helped out in his father's barbershop until his father became ill and Nuse had to drop out of high school. He took a factory job hand-painting lamp shades, where he was recognized for his talent and encouraged to go to art school.

His formal art education began at the Art Academy of Cincinnati in 1905, and he remained there until 1912, studying under Vincent Nowottny and Frank Duveneck. He was a student at the Pennsylvania Academy of the Fine Arts (PAFA) from 1915 to 1918. Nuse won all the major student awards: the Toppan and Thouron Prizes, and two Cresson Traveling Scholarships to travel and study art in Europe.

In 1915, he obtained a part-time teaching job at the Beechwood School near Philadelphia, which enabled him to attend the Pennsylvania Academy of the Fine Arts. During this time, he moved his growing family to live on a farm in Rushland, Bucks County. Between 1917 and 1925, he created many large canvasses of figures in the landscape, focusing on farm life of those times and painting his children and extended family mostly in outdoor settings.

== Career ==
In 1925, Nuse was offered a teaching position at PAFA, where he taught drawing and painting, life and portrait classes until 1954.

That same year, the Nuse family moved to Rushland, Bucks County, a small town with a railroad station that permitted Nuse to commute easily to Philadelphia on his teaching days. Three streams converged in the Rushland valley. These streams, along with many nearby farms became the subject matter for many of the landscapes Nuse painted after 1925.

Although Nuse lived in Bucks County most of his life, he shied away from being part of the New Hope School, a group of artists who followed the lead of William Langson Lathrop and settled in the scenic area around New Hope, Pennsylvania, a small town on the Delaware River. Nuse knew many of the artists in the group, but preferred to keep to himself and his family.

At PAFA, Nuse first was a student of Daniel Garber; after 1925, he became his teaching colleague and the two kept in touch infrequently.

== Career ==
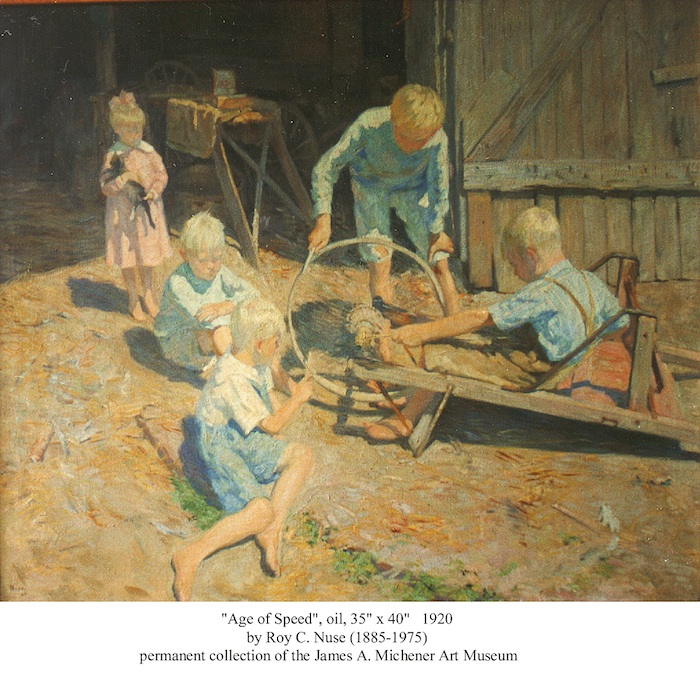
"Age of Speed," Roy C. Nuse, oil, 1920. Depicting three children and two nephews of the artist.

Early in his career, Nuse exhibited works in juried national competitions, and had work accepted in the Corcoran Gallery of Art and the Art Institute of Chicago. However, by the 1930s, as the popularity of Modernism grew, he was having little success and he stopped applying to shows. He became embittered toward the art world that was not interested in representational artists, but remained determined to continue painting in his Impressionist style. During this period, Nuse became known as a portraitist in the Philadelphia area and received a number of commissions to paint physicians and others.

In 1954, Nuse chose to retire from PAFA because of philosophical issues, even though his students begged him not to. He continued to teach privately at his home, and many of his students were devoted to him. Nuse continued to teach and paint, including portrait commissions, into his eighties.

== Death and legacy ==
When Nuse died on January 25, 1975, in Rushland, Pennsylvania. He left a substantial body of his work to his six children. Although he clearly sold many paintings over the years, he never kept records of sales and there is no way to estimate how many of his works are in private collections. For reasons that are not clear, he would not have anything to do with art dealers, preferring to sell his work himself.

In 2000, the James A. Michener Art Museum in Doylestown, Pennsylvania, acquired one of Nuse's works, Age of Speed which depicts five children playing with a wheel in front of a barn. This painting was on display during the retrospective exhibit, Roy C. Nuse – Figures and Landscapes at the Michener Museum in 2002. The 2002 Michener Museum exhibition and some successful results from sales of Nuse's work at Freeman's auction house in Philadelphia have helped to establish his place in art history as a Pennsylvania Impressionist.

After years of critical and commercial neglect, interest in Pennsylvania Impressionism and the New Hope School began to develop in the 1980s and has continued to gain momentum.

Another painting, Artist’s Wife with Three Children is in the permanent collection of the Woodmere Art Museum. Other paintings by Nuse are in the permanent collections of the Pennsylvania Academy of Fine Arts, Swarthmore College, Moravian College and Thomas Jefferson University.

== See also ==
- List of American artists
- List of people from Ohio
- List of people from Philadelphia
