= Lemuel L. Foster =

American civil servant, community leader (1891–1981)

- Born: Lemuel Lewis Foster; November 3, 1890; Meridian, Mississippi, U.S.
- Died: June 20, 1981 (aged 90); New York City, New York, U.S.
- Other names: L. L. Foster
- Education: Tougaloo College, Fisk University
- Occupation(s): Civil servant, business executive, race relations consultant, singer, deacon, teacher, community leader
- Spouse: Netta Mae Mosely (1911–1975; her death)
- Children: 3

Lemuel Lewis Foster Sr. (1890–1981) was an American civil servant, business executive, race relations consultant, singer, and deacon. He was African American and worked as an executive of R. H. Macy & Company (now Macy's), as well as work as a supervisor in the Division of Negro Economics at the United States Department of Labor. He held many community leadership roles in the 20th century in Harlem, New York City.

== Early life and education ==
Lemuel Lewis Foster was born on November 3, 1890, in Meridian, Mississippi. He was the son of Mary Alvina (née Lewis), and William Thomas Foster.

He attended Tougaloo College, a private historically Black college in Jackson, Mississippi; where three of his siblings also attended. Foster later attended Fisk University in Nashville, Tennessee, where in the 1910s he was a member of the Fisk Jubilee Singers, an African-American a cappella ensemble consisting of Fisk University students. He was the bass vocals and the business manager.

Foster married his Fisk University classmate, Netta Mae Mosely in 1911, and together they had three children.

== Career ==
Foster worked at Kowaliga Industrial School in Kowaliga, Alabama for a year after graduation.

From December 1918 until 1919 during World War I, Foster worked as the supervisor of negro economics for the state of Mississippi, a role within of the Division of Negro Economics at the United States Department of Labor. He succeeded Supervisor Rev. J. C. Olden in the position based in Meridian, Mississippi.

Starting in 1920, Foster worked as an executive secretary of the Urban League of Atlanta (now the National Urban League). He also worked during this period for the Victory Life Insurance Company, in their New York City office.

During World War II, Foster worked as a race relations analyst for the United States Army. He also worked as a race relations officer for the Federal Works Agency.

From 1945 until 1949, Foster worked as an executive in the personnel division at R. H. Macy & Company (now Macy's). He left his role in April 1949, but continued his work as a consultant of personnel and race relations.

Foster was a trustee and deacon at Grace Congregational Church of Harlem. He was a member of the Harlem District Committee of the Manhattan Council, the Boy Scouts of America, Chairman of Harlem District Committee of the Red Cross Disaster Service (now American Red Cross), as well as a member of the board of managers for the Harlem YMCA.

In the 1950s, Foster worked at the United States Department of the Treasury, in the U.S. Savings and Treasury Bond Division, and encouraged the Black community to invest in United States Treasury securities.

== Death ==
Foster died at the age of 90 on June 20, 1981, in New York Hospital (now Weill Cornell Medical Center) in New York City. He is interred at Ferncliff Cemetery and Mausoleum in Hartsdale, New York. He was survived by his three children.
