= George Edmund Haynes =

American sociology professor and federal civil servant

- Born: May 11, 1880; Pine Bluff, Arkansas, United States
- Died: January 8, 1960 (aged 79); Brooklyn, New York City, United States
- Education: Fisk University; Yale University; Columbia University
- Occupation: Sociology professor
- Employer(s): Fisk University and President Woodrow Wilson administration
- Spouse: Elizabeth Ross Haynes

George Edmund Haynes (May 11, 1880 – January 8, 1960) was an American sociology scholar and federal civil servant, a co-founder and first executive director of the National Urban League, serving 1911 to 1918. A graduate of Fisk University, he earned a master's degree at Yale University, and was the first African American to earn a doctorate degree from Columbia University, where he completed one in sociology.

Born in Pine Bluff, Arkansas, he moved with his mother and sister to New York City in the Great Migration, and lived and worked from there for most of his life. During the Woodrow Wilson administration, Haynes was appointed in 1918 as director of the newly established Division of Negro Economics in the Department of Labor, as part of an effort by the Democratic administration to build support from blacks for the war effort. They had been disfranchised by Democratic-dominated state governments across the South around the turn of the 20th century, so millions were without political representation.

Haynes was one of the first analysts to write about black labor economics, and later founded the Social Sciences Department of Fisk University. He was a professor there for much of his career. At the NUL, he was also co-founder and patron of Opportunity: A Journal of Negro Life, an academic magazine that also published African-American literature and arts for more than two decades.

== Early life and education ==
Born in 1880 to Louis and Mattie Haynes in Pine Bluff, Arkansas, Haynes attended segregated schools as a child. His mother was a domestic servant and his father a day laborer, and he had a younger sister. His family moved to Hot Springs, Arkansas, to give their children more educational opportunities. Haynes was an ambitious student, which his mother supported. He studied at the Agriculture and Mechanical College for Negroes (now called Alabama A&M University) at Normal, Alabama to prepare for upper-level work.

Haynes enrolled in 1899 at Fisk University, a historically black college, and earned a B.S. in 1903. With his mother and sister, he moved to New York City as part of the Great Migration out of the Deep South. More than 1.5 million African Americans moved from the rural South to the North and Midwest in this period and up until 1940. Haynes was one of the first to write about that movement. In the second wave of the Great Migration, from the 1940s through 1970, another 4.5 million African Americans left the South, many going to the West Coast where the defense industry had grown.

He completed his master's at Yale University in 1904. During the summers of 1906 and 1907, Haynes studied at the University of Chicago, where he became deeply interested in issues related to the migration of rural southern African Americans to the industrial cities of the North and Midwest. When he lived in New York City, he worked to support his mother and sister while taking sociology classes. He began to teach at Fisk while completing his doctoral degree at Columbia University. It was customary for doctoral candidates to work on their degrees while teaching.

Haynes received a sociology PhD in 1912 from Columbia University, becoming the first African American to earn a doctorate from that university. He published his dissertation, The Negro at Work in New York, with Columbia University Press. He lived in New York for most of remainder of his life, while also serving for several years as professor of economics and sociology at Fisk, establishing a clinical center for the training of students in social work.

== Marriage ==
While traveling in the South and studying migration and the colleges during the summers, he met and married Elizabeth Ross. She was conducting similar studies of African-American women.

== Career ==
After completing his master's, Haynes served as secretary to the Colored Men's Department of the International Committee of the YMCA. During this period, he visited historically Black colleges, which had primarily been founded in the southern states since the Civil War. He worked to encourage students in academic success and helped the colleges to set high academic standards, in a period in which there was tension in African-American goals for seeking vocational or classical academic education. From his interest in education, Haynes established the Association of Negro Colleges and Secondary Schools, serving as secretary of that organization from 1910 to 1918.

Haynes helped found the National Urban League, from three organizations, to assist in the urbanization of African Americans that was taking place. He served as its first executive director from 1911 to 1918. He also was a co-founder and patron of Opportunity: A Journal of Negro Life, an academic journal supported by the NUL. Under its founding editor, Charles S. Johnson, the journal also published African-American literature and arts, and encouraged it through playwriting competitions and related activities.

Haynes also helped the New York School of Philanthropy (later the School of Social Work) and NLUCAN at Columbia University in collaborative planning that resulted in the establishment of the first social work training center for black graduate students at Fisk, known as the Bethlehem Training Center. Students were assigned to field work in existing agencies, including branch offices of the NUL. Haynes directed the Bethlehem Center from 1910 to 1918.

During the Great War, the Woodrow Wilson administration worked to build African-American support for the war effort. At the turn of the century, African Americans in the South, where the vast majority still lived, had been largely disenfranchised after white Democratic-dominated legislatures passed various barriers to voter registration, ensuring that the Republican-affiliated blacks were closed out of the political system.

In addition, in the early years of his term, Wilson had lost support among blacks by enabling segregation of federal offices, which had been desegregated for decades. He acceded to the demands of Southerners in his Cabinet. This action was strongly protested by both individual blacks and whites, as well as by leading national organizations such as the NAACP and church groups. Secretary of Labor William B. Wilson led the new War Labor Administration, where he tried to mobilize black workers in the national war effort. In the buildup of the defense industries, both black and white workers were attracted to new, high-paying jobs, and there were often tensions between them due to competition for work. In 1918 the National Urban League held a conference urging appointment of Negro leaders to the Department of Labor; Haynes was its education secretary.

Wilson appointed Haynes to direct the newly established Division of Negro Economics, where he served from 1918 to 1921. In October 1918, the Division claimed control of the "colored section of the Housing Corporation" from the Department of Labor, with Haynes immediately removing its chief, African-American lawyer and suffragist Jeannette Carter (1886 – 1964), who had been appointed earlier that month; the event was reported by The New York Age as "one of the most peculiar cases of its kind on record in the department". With Wilson, Haynes developed a three-part program: (1) organizing inter-racial committees of Negroes and whites from local bodies to promote mutual understanding and deal with problems of discrimination; (2) mounting a national publicity campaign to promote racial harmony and cooperation with the department's war effort; and (3) developing a competent staff of Negro professionals to operate the Division.

Haynes operated through state and local organizations, concentrating in the South, Northeast and Midwest, the major areas affected by the Great Migration, where rapid social change was occurring in major cities. A total of 11 states had program committees by November 1918. They investigated "conditions of Negro workers, educated Negroes and whites on the need for good race relations, helped in job placements, alleviating discrimination and race friction, and developing recommendations for federal action."

After the war, there was considerable social tension as returning veterans of all races tried to find work, and black veterans tried to gain better treatment after their war service. During the Red Summer of 1919, racial riots of whites against blacks broke out in numerous industrial cities during these tensions and economic strife. At that time, the Democratic-dominated Congress suspended funding for Haynes' division. Even with such opposition, Haynes proposed a major government program to help the nation's working Negroes; his vision would not be realized for many years, but he was a trailblazer.

As part of the unsuccessful campaign to get Congress to pass the Dyer Anti-Lynching Bill, Haynes prepared and submitted to Congress in 1919 a 5-part report, "Why Congress Should Investigate Race Riots and Lynchings." The House passed the bill but the Senate, dominated by Solid South Democrats, refused to act on it.

Haynes served as the executive secretary of the Department of Race Relations of the Federal Council of Churches from 1921 to 1947.

After retiring from Fisk, Haynes taught at City College of New York from 1950 to 1959. He continued to be affiliated with the YMCA, surveying its work in South Africa in 1930 (before apartheid was legally established), and in other African nations in 1947. Haynes was also a regional consultant for the YMCA in South Africa from 1942 to 1955.

Haynes died in the King County Hospital in Brooklyn after a brief illness on January 8, 1960.

== Legacy and honors ==
- Haynes and Ruth Standish Baldwin, co-founder of the NUL, are memorialized with a plaque in "The Extra Mile — Points of Light Volunteer Pathway" located on the sidewalks of downtown Washington, D.C.
