= Lloyd R. Ney =

American painter and sculptor (1893–1965)

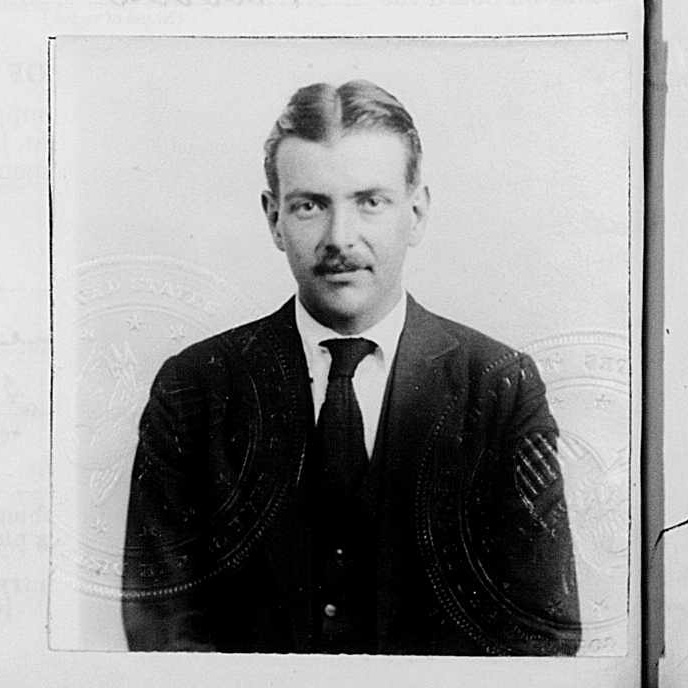
Lloyd R. Ney, 1929 passport photo

Lloyd Raymond "Bill" Ney (March 8, 1893 – May 10, 1965) was an American painter and sculptor known for his textural, non-objective work. During the New Deal, his New London Facets for New London, Ohio was the only abstract art mural commissioned by the Treasury Department for a U.S. Post Office. He exhibited at the Guggenheim during his lifetime, and some of his paintings are in that museum's permanent collection.

Born in Pennsylvania to William W. and Sadie (Maidensford) Ney, when Ney was young his father worked as a postal clerk. On his World War I draft registration card, Ney listed his occupation as "Inspector of Shells." He served in the U.S. Army from July 1917 to July 1919, apparently as a private at a base hospital. He taught at the Kansas City Art Institute. After some time studying art in Paris, Ney eventually settled in New Hope, Pennsylvania, which ultimately became known for its colony of modern artists. Ney died in Pennsylvania in 1965. Some of his paintings were included in the New Hope Modernists 1917–1950 exhibit at the James A. Michener Museum in Doylestown, Pennsylvania in 1991.
