= John Fulton Folinsbee =

American painter (1892–1972)

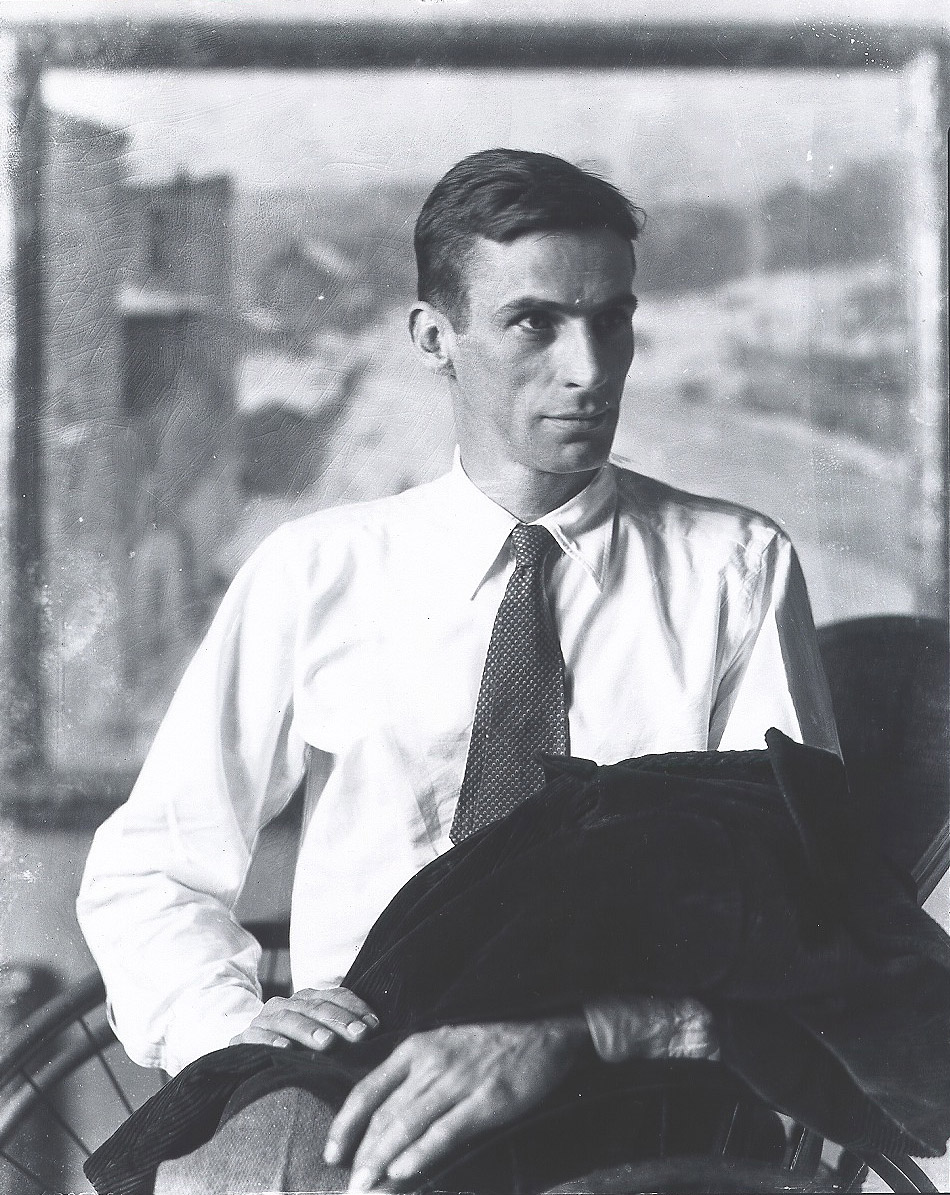
- Folinsbee, seated in a wheelchair in front of his Mending the Canal Bank, c.1937.
- Born: March 14, 1892; Buffalo, New York
- Died: May 10, 1972 (aged 80); New Hope, Pennsylvania
- Education: Art Students League of New York
- Known for: landscapes, seascapes, portraits
- Notable work: Canal in Winter (1917); By the Upper Lock (1922); Outskirts of Trenton (1924); Off Seguin (1952)
- Movement: Pennsylvania Impressionism
- Spouse: Ruth Baldwin Folinsbee
- Awards: Hallgarten Prizes (NAD) 1916, 1917, 1923; Altman Prizes (NAD) 1936, 1941, 1950; Jessie Sesnan Medal (PAFA) 1931

John Fulton "Jack" Folinsbee (March 14, 1892 – May 10, 1972) was an American landscape, marine and portrait painter, and a member of the art colony at New Hope, Pennsylvania. He is best remembered for his impressionist scenes of New Hope and Lambertville, New Jersey, particularly the factories, quarries, and canals along the Delaware River.

== Biography ==
He was born in Buffalo, New York, the middle son of Harrison and Louise Mauger Folinsbee. Beginning at age nine, he attended children's classes at the Art Students' League of Buffalo, but received his first formal training with the landscape painter Jonas Lie in 1907. Folinsbee contracted polio at age 14, which rendered his legs useless, weakened his right arm, and left him permanently reliant on a wheelchair. He attended The Gunnery, a boarding school in Washington, Connecticut, from 1907 to 1911, where he studied with Elizabeth Kempton and Herbert Faulkner. He later studied with Birge Harrison and John Carlson at the Woodstock art colony (Summers, 1912–1914), and with Frank Vincent DuMond at the Art Students League of New York.

At Woodstock, he met Harry (Tony) Leith-Ross, who became a lifelong friend and later followed him to New Hope. In 1914, Folinsbee married Ruth Baldwin (August 8, 1890 – February 13, 1991) – daughter of William H. Baldwin, Jr. and Ruth Standish Baldwin – whom he had met in Washington, Connecticut. The couple moved to New Hope in 1916, and had two daughters, Elizabeth (1917–2016, married Elmer W. Wiggins, 1940); and Joan (1919–2016, married Peter G. Cook, 1938).

Early in his career, Folinsbee painted in a tonalist style, with an interest in light and atmosphere that grew directly from his time with Harrison and Carlson in Woodstock. By the late nineteen-teens, he had moved away from tonalism into a more structured, impressionist style. In the mid-1920s, Folinsbee began studying the work of Cézanne, which led to a trip to France in the summer of 1926. The paintings that resulted from this trip, and those that followed later in the decade, reflect a deep understanding of Cézanne's compositional strategies and a desire to reveal the underlying structure of forms. Folinsbee's exploration of structure led eventually to an analytical, highly individual expressionist style in which he painted for the remainder of his career. His palette darkened, his brushstrokes loosened further, and his sense of light and atmosphere became more dramatic. These later works are concerned with conveying a sense of mood and an intense emotional response to the world around him.

His basic aim was the communication of feeling; the subject had to be felt to be worth painting. The communication of that feeling was what a painting was all about; without that excitement in the subject, a painting was merely a dead reproduction of nature or of natural phenomena. — Peter G. Cook

=== New Hope ===
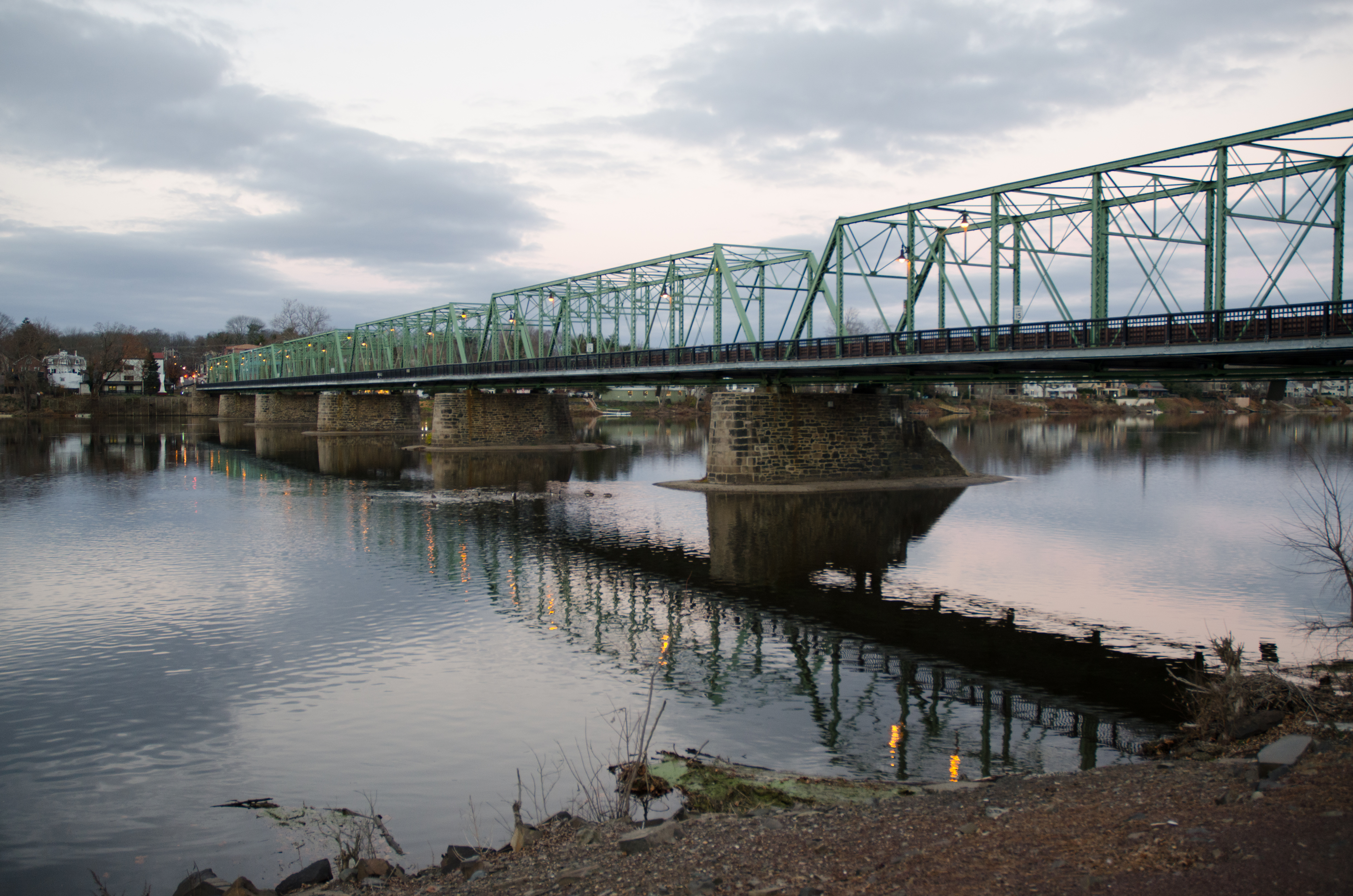
New Hope–Lambertville Bridge, looking west from the New Jersey side

Folinsbee painted en plein air, directly from nature. He always had a sketchbook or a box of 8 x 10 inch canvasboards with him, ready to capture any scene that caught his eye. He and Leith-Ross were famous for spending afternoons sketching from the New Hope-Lambertville Bridge (and for tossing anything that displeased them into the Delaware River). From his wheelchair, Folinsbee could manage "paintings as large as 24 X 30." Larger works were painted in his studio based on drawings and oil sketches. He frequently repeated the same scene on different sized canvases, or as an etching or lithograph. To paint a large work, he would lean a canvas against the studio wall and sit on the floor before it, his withered legs tucked under him. Relying on notes made on the spot about color and light, he would edit the scene as he painted, emphasizing or eliminating elements to enhance the overall mood. "The larger studio paintings were never simply blown-up versions of a successful small painting: rather they were developments of a theme along expressive lines, with memory and emotional reaction playing an important role."

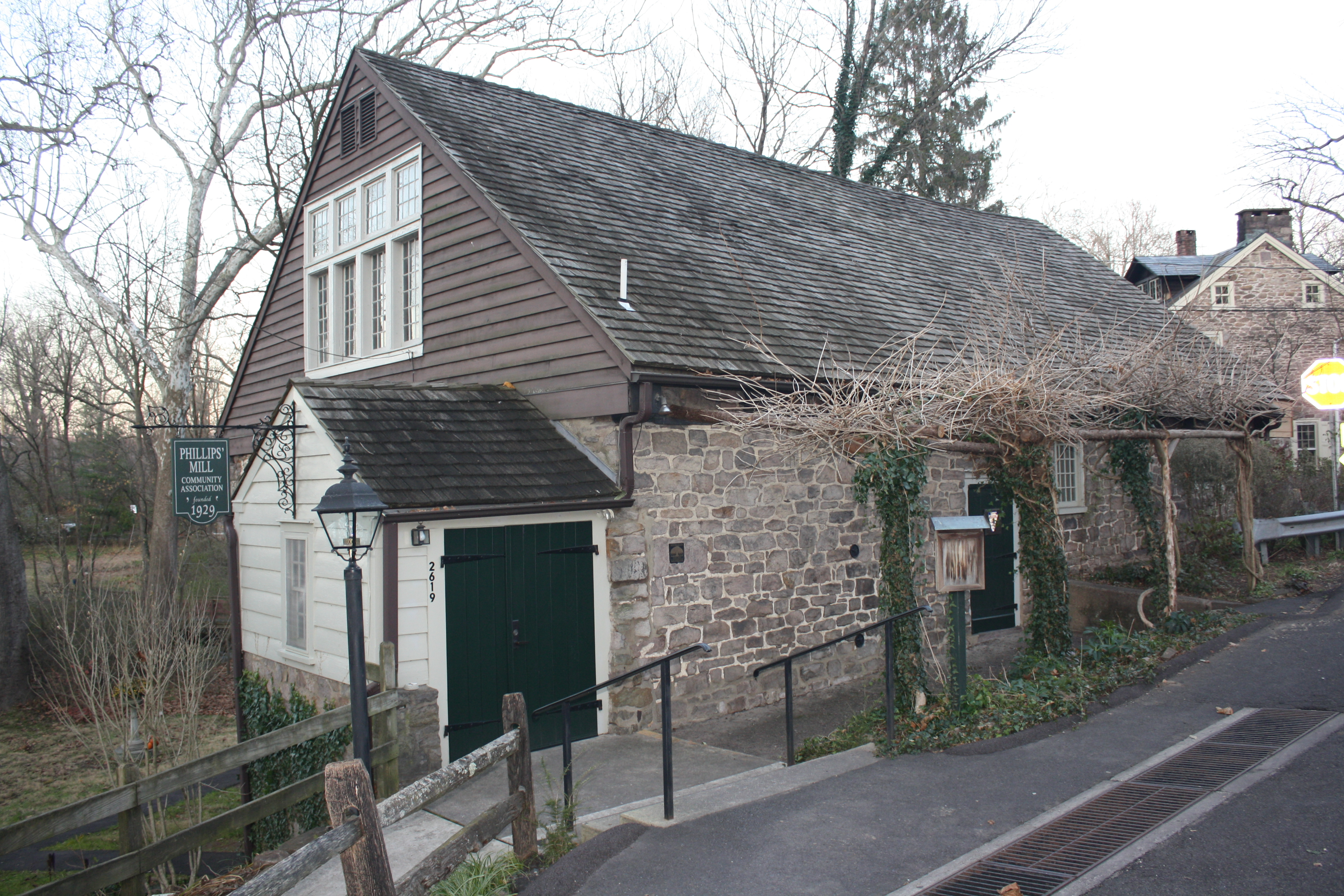
Phillips' Mill Arts Center, 2619 River Road, New Hope

The Folinsbees purchased an acre of riverfront land in New Hope, about a quarter-mile upstream from the bridge and across the street from the house they were renting. In 1924, they hired architect (and landscape painter) Morgan Colt to design them an Arts & Crafts-style house and studio. Folinsbee painted dozens of views of the river from the property – most notably Winter Nocturne (1926), River Ice (c.1936), and his last major work, Zero Morning (1970) – and some views of the house itself. They lived at 160 North Main Street until their deaths.

In 1929, the Folinsbees were among the founders of Phillips' Mill, an arts center housed in a former grist mill, and Ruth Folinsbee served as the first vice-president of its community association. He participated in art exhibitions there from 1929 into the 1960s. His Shag Ledge (c.1959) was awarded the 1963 First Patron's Prize by Phillips' Mill. The Folinsbees were also founding members of the Bucks County Playhouse.

The Great Depression dealt a heavy blow to artists, with little market for luxury goods such as landscape paintings. Folinsbee resorted to bartering his works for services, including dentistry for his daughters. Portraits – for which he typically charged $400 to $500 for a head-and-bust and $1,000 for a three-quarter-length – became a larger part of his output. Edward Beatty Rowan, assistant chief of the Public Buildings Administration's Section of Painting and Sculpture, offered him a commission for a post office mural in Freeland, Pennsylvania. Completed in 1938, Folinsbee's mural is both pastoral and industrial: depicting the town's church spires peeking out from among the autumnal-colored hills, but also featuring the town's massive coal breaker and its long culm dump.

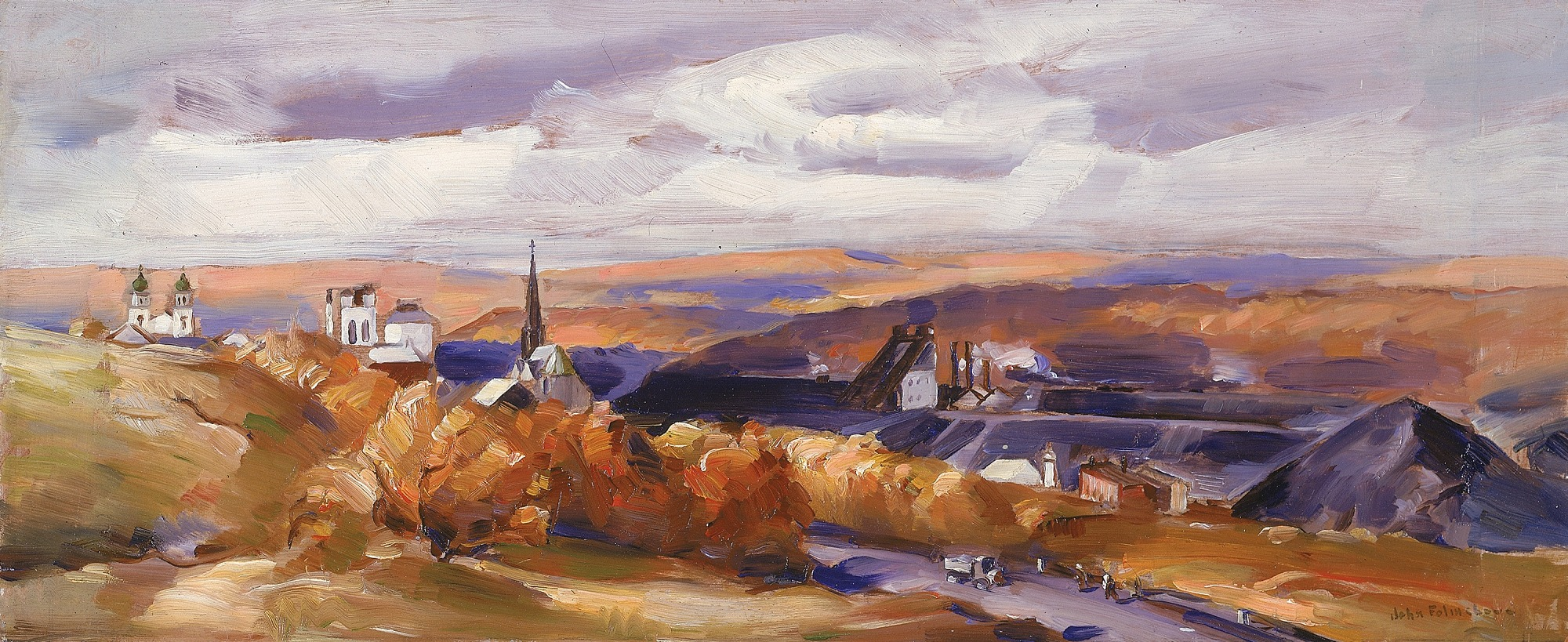
Study for Freeland, Pennsylvania post office mural (1938), Smithsonian American Art Museum

Folinsbee was also a teacher. One of his better-known students, Peter G. Cook (who married his daughter Joan in 1938), became a colleague and friend. The pair collaborated on murals for two other federal projects: the Federal Building and U.S. Courthouse in Paducah, Kentucky (1939), and the post office in Burgettstown, Pennsylvania (1942).

=== Maine ===
In the mid-1930s, Folinsbee and his family began spending their summers in Maine. He bought a farmhouse at Murphy's Corner, between Bath and Wiscasset, in 1949. Despite his intense wariness of the ocean, he embarked on a new aspect of his career—as a marine painter. His Off Seguin (Ellingwood Rock) was awarded the 1952 Palmer Marine Prize by the National Academy of Design. With the prize money, Folinsbee bought a 25-foot motorized Hampton dory (flat-bottomed open boat) that he named "Sketch" and equipped as a floating studio.

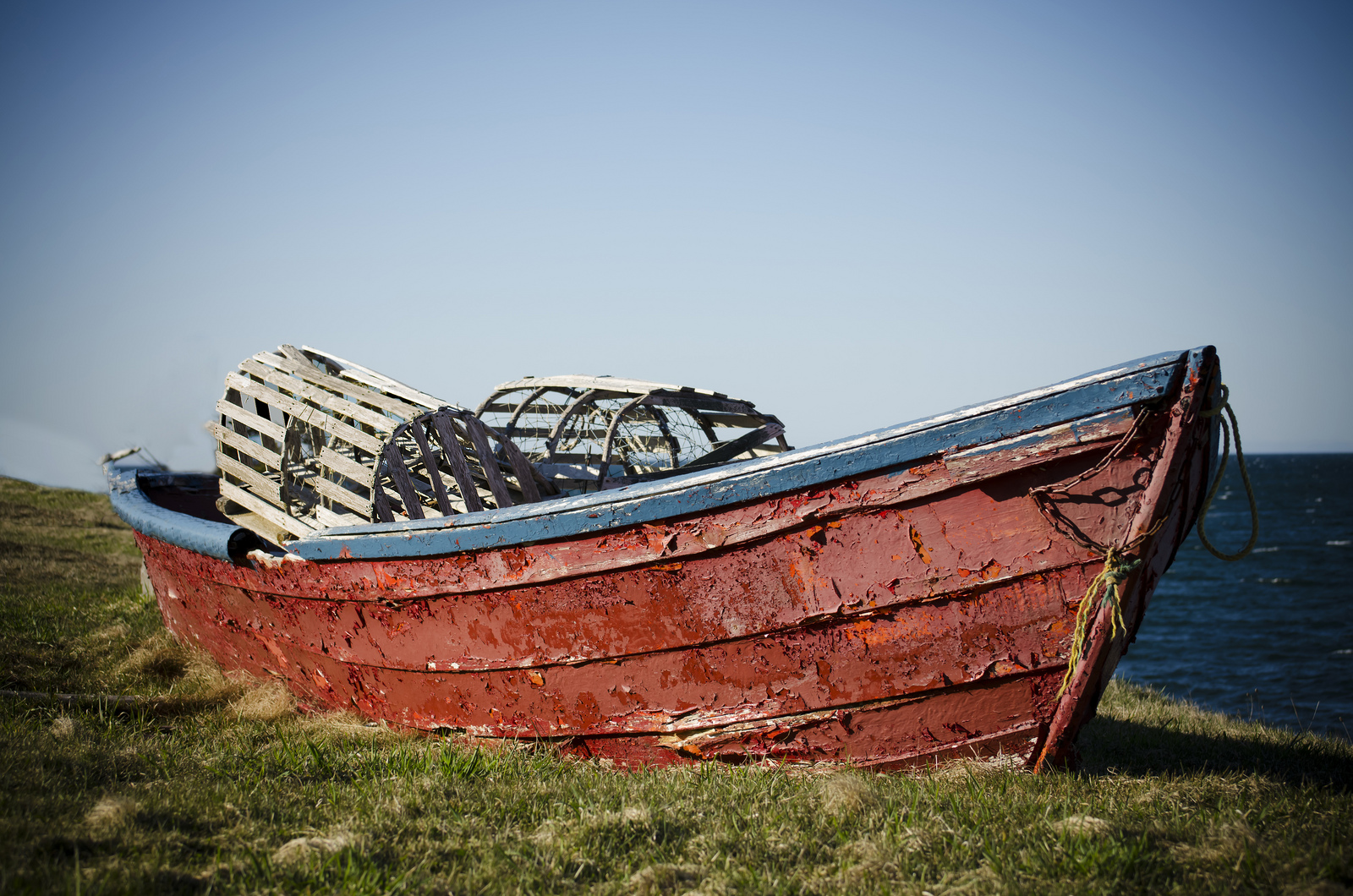
Dory

One day I suddenly realized that the waves of a heavy sea duplicate what El Greco did in painting the heavy folds of his drapery. The quick turn of the waves is like that of his folds, in that the darkest dark is against the lightest light. The greatest contrast comes at the sharpest point where the wave turns up—where there is a dark, there is a light—it is that way in the folds of El Greco's garments. I've always been fascinated with the way he twists those big folds—exaggeration perhaps, but true in expressing the play of light on form. — John Folinsbee

Folinsbee was diagnosed with cancer in the late 1960s, which further weakened his right arm. He stopped painting in 1971, and died a year later in New Hope.

=== Critical reception and honors ===
The River (1939), mural at the Federal Building and U.S. Courthouse, Paducah, Kentucky

Folinsbee's work has been described as the "rural counterpart" to the Ashcan School. Critic Robert E. Baum (son of artist Walter Emerson Baum) saw in him "the power, frankness, and story-telling quality of a George Bellows or a Winslow Homer. This man sees the rhythm of beauty coupled with a color harmony in many workaday nooks that may seem ugly to the average passerby." In Modern American Painting (1940), Peyton Boswell, Jr. placed him among the "Lyricists"—"the moody ones, dreamers and mystics," who "work sometimes in pattern, but more often in terms of light, shadow and chiaroscuro. They use color and form for emotional rather than aesthetic reasons."

Folinsbee was elected an Associate of the National Academy of Design in 1919, and a full Academician in 1928. He was elected a member of the Salmagundi Club in 1913, a life member of the National Arts Club in 1922, and a member of the Century Association in 1937. He was inducted into the American Academy of Arts and Letters in 1953.

Folinsbee was represented by Ferargil Gallery in New York City for most of his career. His paintings were included in touring exhibitions across the United States, and in several international exhibitions. He won nearly every award given by the National Academy of Design, receiving some of them multiple times. (Note: NAD awarded Folinsbee the 3rd Hallgarten Prize in 1916 (for Winter Quiet), the 2nd Hallgarten Prize in 1917 (for Canal in Winter), and the 1st Hallgarten Prize in 1923 (for By the Upper Lock); the Carnegie Prize in 1921 (for Jersey Waterfront); the Murphy Prize in 1921 (for High River) and again in 1926 (for Bourré); the Altman Prize in 1936 (for Windy Bush Lock), again in 1941 (for Hunterdon County), and for a third time in 1950 (for Night); the Anonymous Prize in 1949 (for River Wall); and the Palmer Prize in 1952 (for Off Seguin).) He exhibited at the Pennsylvania Academy of the Fine Arts most years from 1915 to 1952, and was awarded the 1931 Jessie Sesnan Medal (for Canal and River). He also won awards from the Connecticut Academy of Fine Arts, the Rhode Island School of Design, the Corcoran Gallery of Art, the Salmagundi Club, and other arts organizations. He was awarded a bronze medal at the 1926 Sesquicentennial Exposition in Philadelphia (for Outskirts of Trenton).

=== Legacy ===
Folinsbee's work is in the permanent collections of major museums, including the Smithsonian American Art Museum, the National Gallery of Art, The Phillips Collection, the National Academy of Design, and the Pennsylvania Academy of the Fine Arts. A bronze bust of him by his friend Harry Rosin is in the collection of the Pennsylvania Academy of the Fine Arts.

Folinsbee's students included artists Peter G. Cook and Evelyn Allen Faherty. Cook became his son-in-law, and wrote a personal memoir, John Folinsbee (1994).

Kirsten M. Jensen, senior curator at the James A. Michener Art Museum in Doylestown, Pennsylvania, is the author of Folinsbee Considered (2014), a scholarly biography and catalogue raisonné. The Michener Museum maintains an online version of the catalogue raisonné, which is updated as additional Folinsbee works are identified.

== Selected works ==
=== Landscapes ===
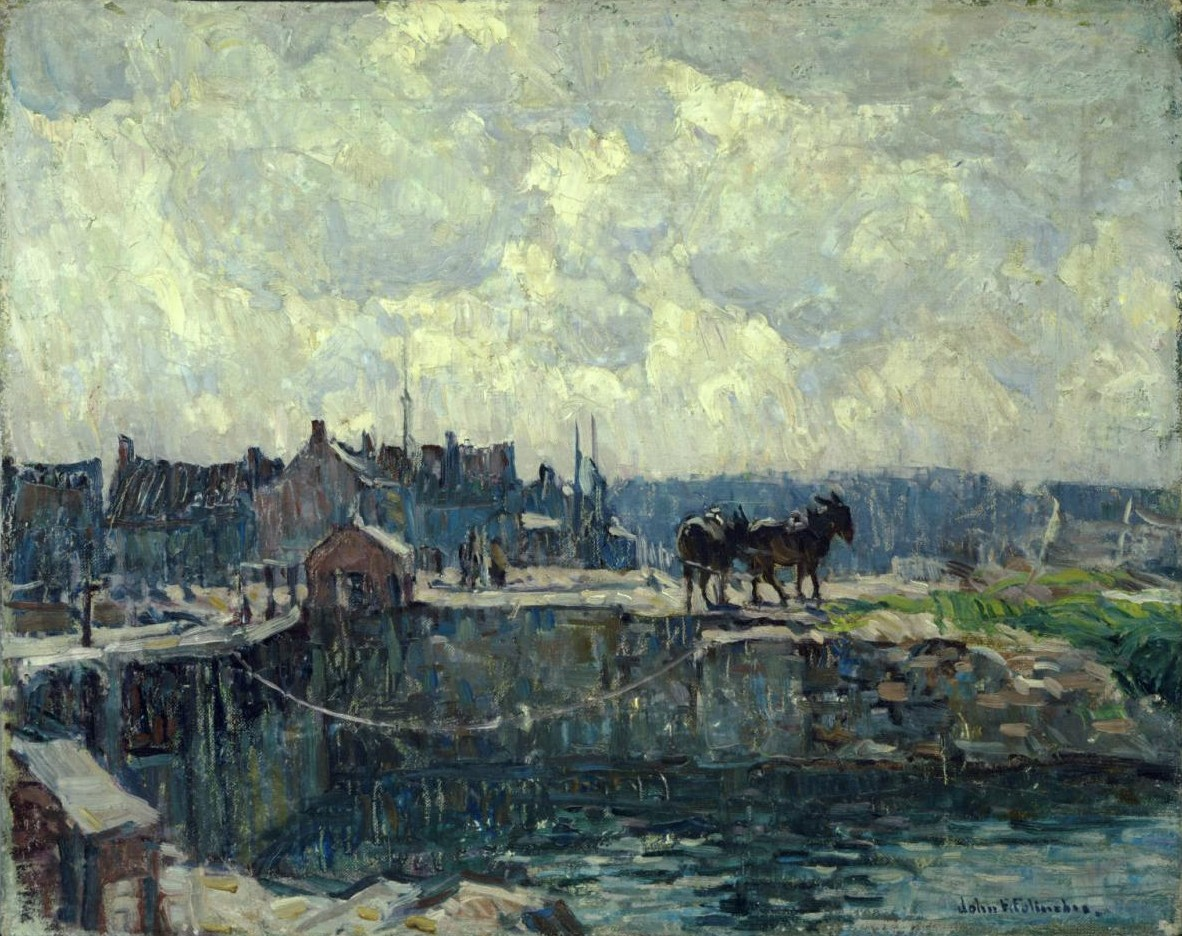
Along the Canal (c.1916-1921), The Phillips Collection, Washington, D.C.

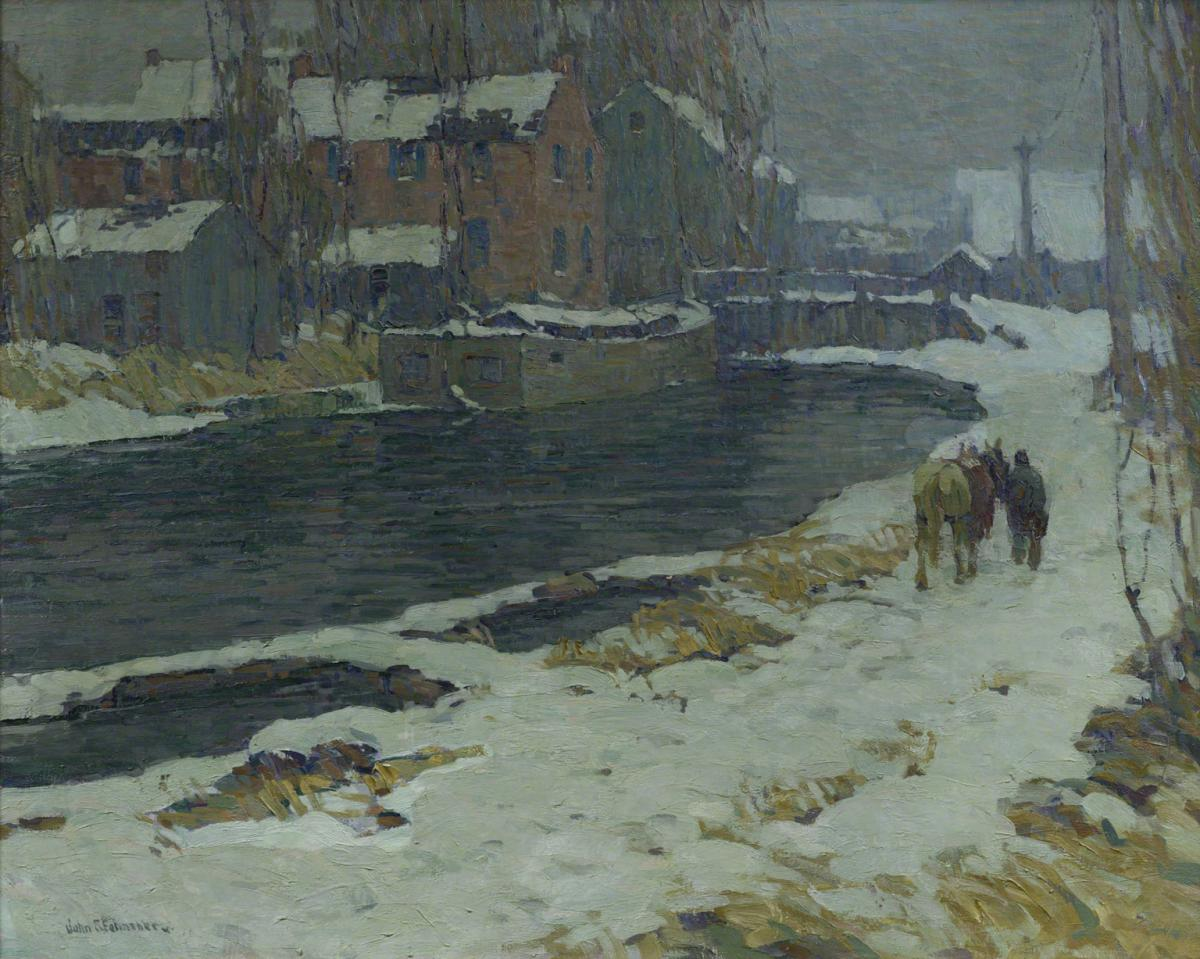
Grey Thaw (1920), The Phillips Collection, Washington, D.C.

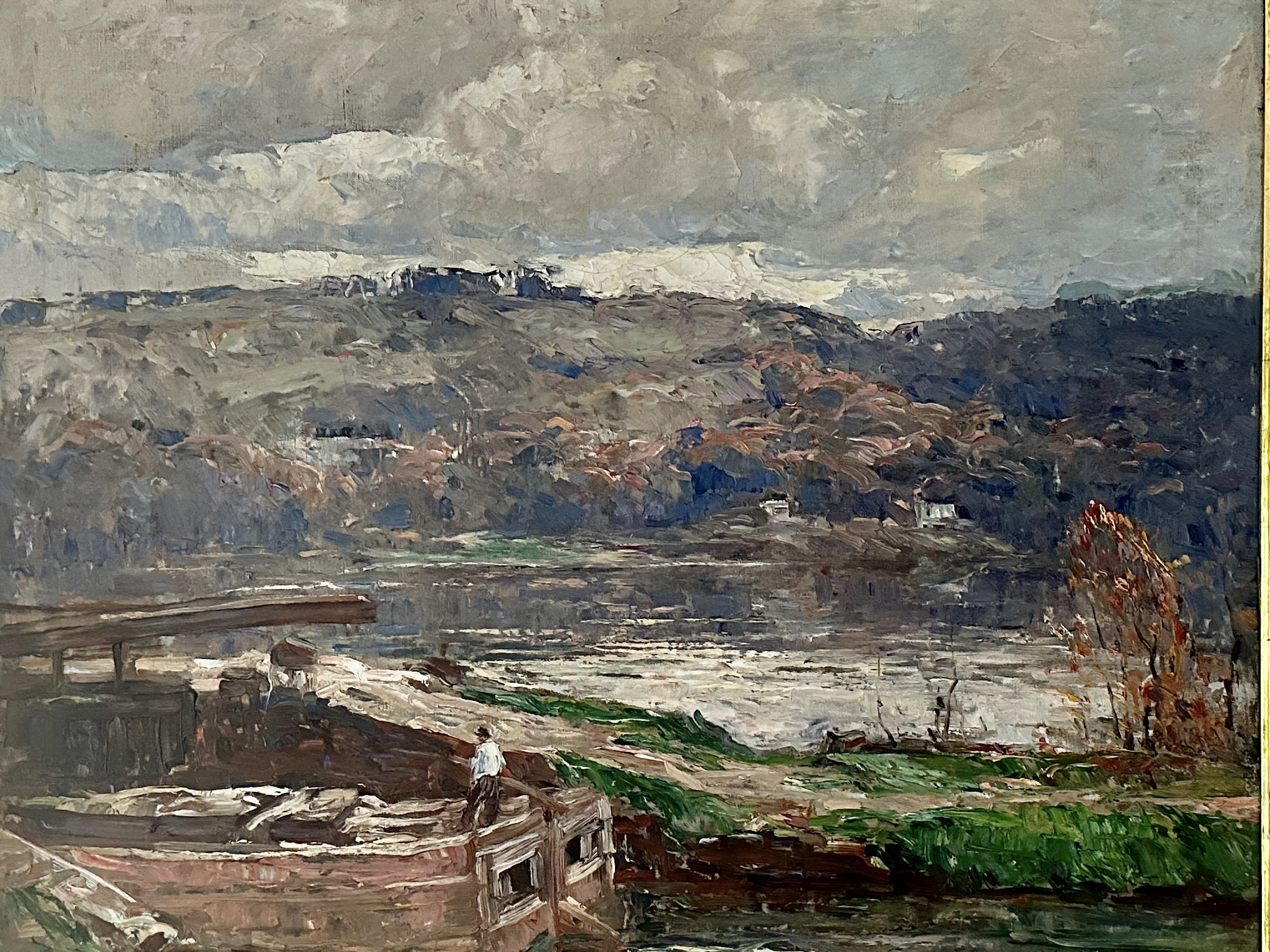
Cloud Shadowed (1924), private collection

- Poughkeepsie Bridge (1914), private collection. Awarded the 1914 Isidore Prize by the Art Students League of New York.
- Gloucester Hillside (1916), Princeton University Art Museum, Princeton, New Jersey.
- February (Village in Winter) (1916), Hood Museum of Art, Dartmouth College, Hanover, New Hampshire.
- Canal in Winter (c.1916-17), National Arts Club, New York City. Awarded the 1917 Second Hallgarten Prize by the National Academy of Design.
- Along the Canal (c.1916-21), The Phillips Collection, Washington, D.C.
- Oncoming Clouds (c.1918), North Carolina Museum of Art, Raleigh, North Carolina.
- Grey Thaw (1920), National Gallery of Art, Washington, D.C. (ex coll. Corcoran Gallery of Art).
- By the Upper Lock (1922), Smithsonian American Art Museum, Washington, D.C. Awarded the 1923 First Hallgarten Prize by the National Academy of Design.
- Canal at Trenton (1923), National Academy of Design Museum, New York City.
- Mending the Canal Bank (1923), private collection.
- Grey Coryell (1923), Dallas Museum of Art, Dallas, Texas.
- Mill by the River, Fall (c.1923-25), James A. Michener Art Museum, Doylestown, Pennsylvania.
- Cloud Shadowed (1924), private collection
- Outskirts of Trenton (1924), Huntington Museum of Art, Huntington, West Virginia. Awarded a bronze medal at the 1926 Sesquicentennial Exposition.
- Lehigh Canal (c.1924-25), Palmer Museum of Art, Pennsylvania State University, State College, Pennsylvania.
- Canal at Goat Hill (1925), Rhode Island School of Design Museum, Providence, Rhode Island. Awarded the 1925 Gedney Bunce Prize by the Connecticut Academy of Fine Arts.
- Winter Nocturne (1926), Reading Public Museum, Reading, Pennsylvania.
- Shad Boat (1927), Huntington Museum of Art, Huntington, West Virginia.
- Slate Quarry, Bangor (1929), Woodmere Art Museum, Philadelphia, Pennsylvania.
- Bridge on the Cher (1929), Salmagundi Club of New York
- Canal Bridge, New Hope (c.1929-32), James A. Michener Art Museum, Doylestown, Pennsylvania.
- Canal and River (1930), private collection. Awarded the 1931 Jessie Sesnan Medal by the Pennsylvania Academy of the Fine Arts.
- Storm Light (1936), Reading Public Museum, Reading, Pennsylvania.
- Bowman's Hill (1936), James A. Michener Art Museum, Doylestown, Pennsylvania.
- River Ice (c.1936), James A. Michener Art Museum, Doylestown, Pennsylvania.
- Freeland (Study for Freeland, Pennsylvania Post Office Mural) (1938), Smithsonian American Art Museum, Washington, D.C.
- Evening at Swan's Island (1938), Ogunquit Museum of American Art, Ogunquit Maine.
- Hunterdon County (1940), New Jersey State Museum, Trenton, New Jersey. Awarded the 1941 Altman Prize by the National Academy of Design.
- Skaters, Dark Hollow (1945), Pennsylvania Academy of the Fine Arts, Philadelphia, Pennsylvania.
- Hazelton Brickyard (1950), Allentown Art Museum, Allentown, Pennsylvania.
- Zero Morning (1970), private collection. Folinsbee's last major work.

=== Seascapes ===
- Shag Rock (c.1950), Woodmere Art Museum, Philadelphia, Pennsylvania.
- Off Seguin (Ellingwood Rock) (1952), Portland Museum of Art, Portland, Maine. Awarded the 1952 Palmer Marine Prize by the National Academy of Design.
- Lopaus Point (1957), Farnsworth Art Museum, Rockland, Maine.
- Ellingwood Rock (1960), James A. Michener Art Museum, Doylestown, Pennsylvania.

=== Murals ===
- Freeland (1938), Post Office, Freeland, Pennsylvania
- View of Burgettstown (1942), Post Office, Burgettstown, Pennsylvania, with Peter G. Cook
- Federal Building and U.S. Courthouse, Paducah, Kentucky
  - Early Town (Lewis and Clark in Paducah) (1942), with Peter G. Cook
  - The River (Paducah, Kentucky) (1942), with Peter G. Cook

=== Portraits ===
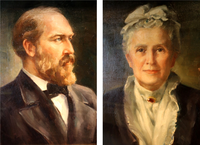
President James A. Garfield and First Lady Lucretia Garfield (posthumous portraits, c.1920), James A. Garfield National Historic Site, Lake County, Ohio

- Self-Portrait (1919), National Academy of Design Museum, New York City.
- Posthumous portrait of President James A Garfield (c.1920), James A. Garfield National Historic Site, Lake County, Ohio
- Posthumous portrait of First Lady Lucretia Garfield (c.1920), James A. Garfield National Historic Site, Lake County, Ohio
- Harry Leith-Ross (1928), National Academy of Design Museum, New York City.
- Ruth Standish Baldwin (1929), Smith College, Northampton, Massachusetts. Folinsbee's mother-in-law.
- James Kellum Smith (1942), National Academy of Design Museum, New York City.
- Self-Portrait at Fifty (1942), private collection.
- William Thon (c.1950-51), National Academy of Design Museum, New York City.
- A. Dayton Oliphant (1958), New Jersey State Capitol, Trenton. Justice of the New Jersey Supreme Court.
- Peter Geoffrey Cook (1964), National Academy of Design Museum, New York City. Folinsbee's son-in-law.
