= Ruth Standish Baldwin =

American suffragist (1865–1934)

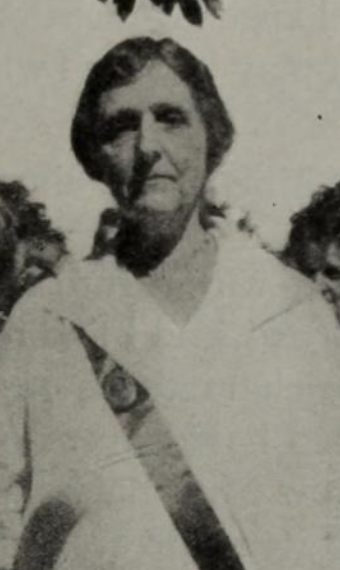
- Ruth Standish Baldwin at a parade in 1925; from a 1926 publication of Smith College
- Born: December 5, 1865; Ludlow, Massachusetts, United States
- Died: December 14, 1934 (aged 69); New York City, United States
- Known for: Co-founder, National Urban League
- Spouse: William Henry Baldwin Jr.
- Parent: Samuel Bowles III
- Relatives: Chester B. Bowles (nephew); John Fulton Folinsbee (son-in-law); Samuel Bowles (grand-nephew)

Ruth Standish Bowles Baldwin (December 5, 1865 – December 14, 1934) was an American suffragist and a co-founder of the National Urban League.

== Early life and education ==
Ruth Standish Bowles was born in Ludlow, Massachusetts, the daughter of journalist and abolitionist Samuel Bowles III and Mary Sanford Dwight Schermerhorn Bowles. Her parents were friends with poet Emily Dickinson and her family. She graduated from Smith College in 1887.

== Career ==
In 1905, Baldwin joined with Frances Kellor, a social worker and attorney, to form the National League for the Protection of Colored Women in order to protect women migrating to the north who might be "easy targets for con men who could lead them into prostitution". The NLPCW organized to steer women into safe employment instead. She founded the Committee on Urban Conditions Among Negros with George Edmund Haynes in 1910. She wrote of the principles behind her work:

Let us work together, not as colored people, nor as white people, for the narrow benefit of any group alone, but together, as American citizens for the common good of our common city, our common country.

From this work, Baldwin became a co-founder of the National Urban League, and chair of the league's board from 1913 to 1915. She helped found Highlander Folk School at the end of her life. She corresponded with Booker T. Washington.

Baldwin was the first woman elected to a permanent position on the board of trustees at Smith College, serving on the board from 1906 to 1926. "The business of the College, transacted in the presence of a mind so clear and sympathies so ardent, undergoes a change," wrote a colleague at Smith. "To express at all what Mrs. Baldwin is and what she has given Smith College would require more space and more art than the present writer has at her command."

== Personal life and legacy ==
Bowles married railroad tycoon William Henry Baldwin Jr. in 1889. They had two children, also named Ruth and William. Her daughter married artist John Fulton Folinsbee. Her husband died in 1905, and she died in 1934, at the age of 69, in New York. The economist Samuel Bowles is her grand-nephew, son of her nephew Chester B. Bowles, who was notable as a governor of Connecticut and an ambassador. Ruth Standish Baldwin and George Haynes are honored as founders of the National Urban League with a plaque on the Extra Mile Path in Washington, D.C.
