= Division of Negro Economics =

Former part of the US Department of Labor

The Division of Negro Economics was a division of the US Department of Labor created during World War I in the United States. It was established during Woodrow Wilson's presidency on May 1, 1918. George E. Haynes of the National Urban League was appointed to head it. It ceased as a separate division in 1921 under the Warren Harding administration and became effectively defunct in 1922.

In October 1918, the Division claimed control of the "colored section of the Housing Corporation" from the Department of Labor, with Haynes immediately removing its chief, African-American lawyer and suffragist Jeannette Carter (1886–1964), who had been appointed earlier that month; the event was reported by the New York Age as "one of the most peculiar cases of its kind on record in the department". With Wilson, Haynes developed a three-part program: First, organizing inter-racial committees of "Negroes" and whites from local bodies to promote mutual understanding and deal with problems of discrimination; second, mounting a national publicity campaign to promote racial harmony and cooperation with the department's war effort; and third, developing a competent staff of "Negro" professionals to operate the Division.

The division produced three research reports. Emma L. Shields researched the report "Negro Women in Industry". William Jennifer was another researcher for the division.

Haynes operated through state and local organizations, concentrating in the South, Northeast and Midwest, the major areas affected by the Great Migration, where rapid social change was occurring in major cities. A total of 11 states had program committees by November 1918. They investigated "conditions of Negro workers, educated Negroes and whites on the need for good race relations, helped in job placements, alleviating discrimination and race friction, and developing recommendations for federal action."

After the war, there was considerable social tension as returning veterans tried to find work and black veterans tried to gain better treatment after their war service. During the Red Summer of 1919, racial riots of whites against blacks broke out in numerous industrial cities during these tensions and economic strife. At that time, the Democratic-dominated Congress suspended funding for Haynes' division.

It ceased as a separate division in 1921 under the Warren Harding administration and became effectively defunct in 1922.

== Reports ==
- "Negro Migration in 1916–1917”
- "The Negro at Work During the World War and During Reconstruction"
- "Negro Women in Industry", published after the division was closed

== See also ==
- Freedmen's Bureau
- Federal Reserve Archival System for Economic Research
