= Elizabeth Ross Haynes =

American sociologist and author

- Born: July 31, 1883; Mount Willing, Alabama
- Died: October 26, 1953 (aged 70); New York City
- Education: State Normal School of Montgomery; Fisk University (AB); Columbia University (MA)
- Spouse: George Edmund Haynes
- Scientific career
- Fields: sociology
- Workplaces: Young Women's Christian Association,

Elizabeth Ross Haynes (July 31, 1883 – October 26, 1953) was an African American social worker, sociologist, and author. She wrote the book Unsung Heroes about African Americans and their achievements.

== Biography ==
Elizabeth Ross was born on July 31, 1883, in Mount Willing, Alabama to formerly enslaved parents Henry and Mary (née Carnes) Ross. She was valedictorian of her class at the State Normal School of Montgomery. She won a scholarship to Fisk University and received her AB from there in 1903. From 1905 to 1907, she summered in Chicago, attending graduate school at the University of Chicago. In 1908 she became the first black national secretary of the Young Women's Christian Association (YWCA). She married sociologist George Edmund Haynes in 1910 and had a son, George Jr., in 1912. She volunteered at what would become the United States Women's Bureau and became a domestic service secretary for the United States Employment Service. In 1919, with Elizabeth Carter and Mary Church Terrell, she petitioned the International Congress of Working Women to offer programs relevant to black women. She wrote the 1921 book Unsung Heroes which details African-American lives and achievements.

Haynes pursued her master's degree at Columbia University, where her thesis was "Two Million Negro Women at Work", a landmark study on black women and employment. She received her MA in 1923. She was elected to the national board of the YWCA in 1924. Haynes was a member of Alpha Kappa Alpha sorority.

Ross published The Black Boy of Atlanta, her biography of R.R. Wright, in 1952. Ross died in New York City on October 26, 1953.
