= Fern Coppedge =

American painter

- Born: Fern Isabel Kuns; July 28, 1883; Decatur, Illinois
- Died: April 21, 1951 (aged 67); New Hope, Pennsylvania
- Education: Art Institute of Chicago; Art Students League of New York; Pennsylvania Academy of the Fine Arts.
- Movement: Pennsylvania Impressionism
- Spouse: Robert W. Coppedge

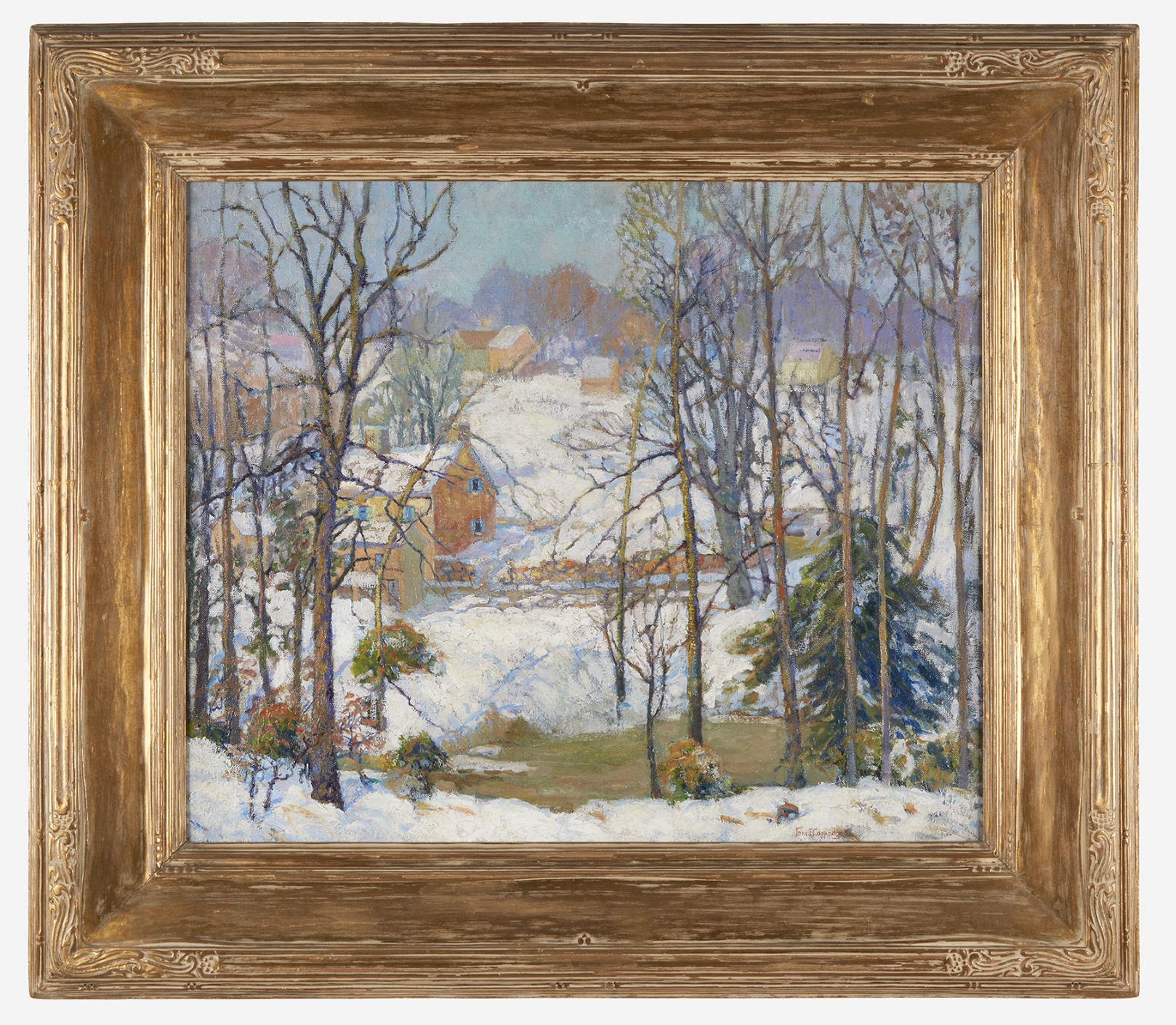
Village in Winter, 25 x 30 inch oil on canvas painting by Fern Isabel Coppedge

Fern Isabel Coppedge (July 28, 1883 – April 21, 1951) was an American impressionist painter.

== Life ==
Born in the small town of Cerro Gordo near Decatur, Illinois, to John L. Kuns and Maria Dilling Kuns, Fern Coppedge spent much of her life in Pennsylvania where she was associated with the New Hope School of American Impressionism, the Fellowship of the Pennsylvania Academy of Fine Arts, and the Philadelphia Art Alliance, and what became known as the Pennsylvania Impressionism movement.

Fern was a student of William Merritt Chase and attended the Art Institute of Chicago, the Art Students League of New York, and the Pennsylvania Academy of the Fine Arts. During her artistic career she received several awards including the Shillard Medal in Philadelphia, a Gold Medal from the Exposition of Women’s Achievements, another Gold Medal from the Plastics Club of Philadelphia, and the Kansas City H.O. Dean Prize for Landscape. She was a member of several prominent art organizations including the Philadelphia Art Alliance, the Art Students League of New York, and the Philadelphia Ten.

Coppedge became well known for her work as a landscape impressionist, painting snow scenes of the villages and farms of Bucks County.

The Michener Art Museum in Doylestown, Pennsylvania, displayed 50 of the artist's paintings in a retrospective exhibition in 1990 titled "Fern Coppedge: A Forgotten Woman" and published a 48-page catalog. In 2020–2021, the museum held another solo exhibition of her work, featuring new acquisitions and celebrating the digitization of her scrapbooks.

Coppedge died in New Hope, Pennsylvania, on April 21, 1951, at the age of 67.

Her husband, Robert W. Coppedge, a science teacher and botanist, was born in Missouri in 1878 and died in New Hope, Pennsylvania in 1948. The Coppedges were married in 1904 (not 1910) and remained husband and wife for 44 years.

== Works ==
In 2011 a newly discovered landscape painting by Coppedge, entitled October, was sold at auction for $29,800. In 2006 a Coppedge painting was auctioned for $308,000.
