= John Wells James =

American painter

- Born: John Wells James Jr. February 22, 1873; Brooklyn, New York
- Died: April 8, 1951 (aged 78); Magagnosc, France
- Known for: painting
- Movement: impressionism
- Website: http://johnwellsjames.com/2.html

John Wells James Jr. (1873–1951) was an American artist who created impressionist landscape paintings. James was associated with the Salmagundi Club in Greenwich Village and the "New Hope School of Impressionism" in Bucks County, Pennsylvania. James worked as a New York businessman who founded a wholesale drug company and the Kings Highway Saving Bank, while pursuing painting as a lifelong hobby. He held his first public exhibition at the Salmagundi Club in 1950 when he was 77 years old. James died on April 8, 1951, in Magagnosc, France.
