= Nate Dunn =

American painter (1896–1983)

- Born: Nathan Dunn; 4 July 1896; Pittsburgh, Pennsylvania, U.S.
- Died: 17 November 1983 (aged 87)
- Education: Carnegie Institute of Technology
- Known for: Painting, Oil painting, Pastel
- Notable work: The Cove, Abstract, Three Seasons
- Movement: Impressionism, Modernism, Still Life, Abstract art

Nathan Dunn (1896–1983) was an American painter born July 4, 1896, in Pittsburgh, Pennsylvania. Dunn's work is associated with the Pennsylvania Impressionists. He was an impressionist, abstract, and modernist artist and was named a Fellow of the Royal Society of Arts. His paintings are held in private and museum collections.

== Life ==
Nathan "Nate" Dunn was born July 4, 1896, in Pittsburgh, Pennsylvania, to Polish-Russian parents (Israel and Edith "Ida" Dunn). He moved to Sharon, Pennsylvania in the Shenango Valley in 1926 and remained there until his death. Dunn was an art teacher at the Julia F. Girls' Buhl School in Sharon for over twenty-five years. He studied at the Carnegie Institute of Technology (now Carnegie Mellon University). Dunn's paintings were primarily abstract, impressionist, and still lifes and he had various one-man art exhibits. Dunn was married to Beatrice M. Dunn and died on November 17, 1983.

== Career ==
Dunn studied painting and illustration at the Carnegie Institute of Technology, and became best known for his impressionist, abstract, and modernist works throughout the tri-state area of Pennsylvania, Ohio, and West Virginia. He also painted in Cape Cod, Massachusetts, during the summer months.

Dunn had his first major one-man show in 1957 at the Butler Institute of American Art. This was followed by a solo exhibition at the Pittsburgh Playhouse in September 1958. In 1960, he exhibited at the Canton Art Institute in Ohio, now the Canton Museum of Art (Ohio). During 1959 and 1960 three of Dunn's oil paintings won first prize at the Freeland Art Show in Conneaut Lake, PA ("Three Seasons" in 1959 and "The Cove" and "Waiting" in 1960). In November 1963 Dunn had a one-man exhibition at the Fine arts Forum in Warren, Ohio. He also exhibited at the Carnegie Museum of Art in Pittsburgh. By 1977 Dunn had shown his paintings in at least twelve solo exhibitions.

In the early 1960s Dunn's paintings were sought out by Vincent Price after the actor met Dunn. As a result of their meeting, Dunn's work was represented in the Vincent Price Collection of Fine Art, which began in 1962 when Sears commissioned Vincent Price to acquire fine works of art in order to make fine art available to a wider audience.

Dunn's work is in the permanent collections of the Butler Institute of American Art in Youngstown, Ohio, the Carnegie Institute of Technology in Pittsburgh, Thiel College in Greenville, Pennsylvania and the Pennsylvania State College.

Dunn was made a Fellow of the Royal Society of Arts by the Royal Society of Arts and was a member of the Associated Artists of Pittsburgh. He was also a member of the Pennsylvania Impressionists and the New Hope School and is associated with artists from the Carnegie Institute of Technology such as Arthur Watson Sparks, Charles Taylor, and George Sotter. He also was friends and corresponded with the artist Clyde Singer who was affiliated with the Butler Institute of American Art.

From 1973 to 1984 Dunn was listed in Who's Who in American Art and in 1999 in Who Was Who in American Art and he is listed in Davenport's. .

On August 24, 1983, Dunn's family auctioned five-hundred forty-five paintings by Dunn at a public auction at the artist's home. Following this auction the majority of Dunn's paintings which were until then unavailable to the public, virtually his "life's work" according to "The Herald" in Sharon, Pennsylvania, passed into private hands and collections. On July 31, 2012, and November 7, 2012, Gray's Auctioneers in Cleveland, Ohio, also offered a large number of Dunn's paintings (around one-hundred) at auction. As a result of these auctions, most of Dunn's paintings are now owned privately or are included in private art collections.
