= Frederick Harer =

American artist (1879–1949)

Washerwomen, by Frederick Harer

Frederick Harer (November 15, 1879 – April 27, 1949) was an American painter, sculptor and etcher, best known for his skill as a gilder and framemaker. He produced frames for many of the Pennsylvania Impressionist painters, including Edward Redfield and Daniel Garber. Today, having a Harer frame on a Pennsylvania Impressionist painting adds significantly to its value.

Harer was born in Blossburg, Pennsylvania. The son of a successful cabinetmaker, Harer had worked for his father as a youth and inherited his tools upon his father's death.

He studied at the Pennsylvania Museum School of Industrial Arts and the Pennsylvania Academy of the Fine Arts (1900–1903 and 1908–1910), where his teachers included Thomas Anschutz and William Merritt Chase.

Harer also traveled extensively, and his work and design was heavily influenced by Spain and the West Indies.

He exhibited at the National Academy of Design and the Pennsylvania Academy of Fine Arts. He was a teacher and mentor to Ben Badura, and inspired the work of framers Francis A. Coll and Cullen Yeats.

He died on April 27, 1949, in Uhlerstown, Pennsylvania.
