= William Henry Baldwin Jr. =

American railroad executive (1863–1905)

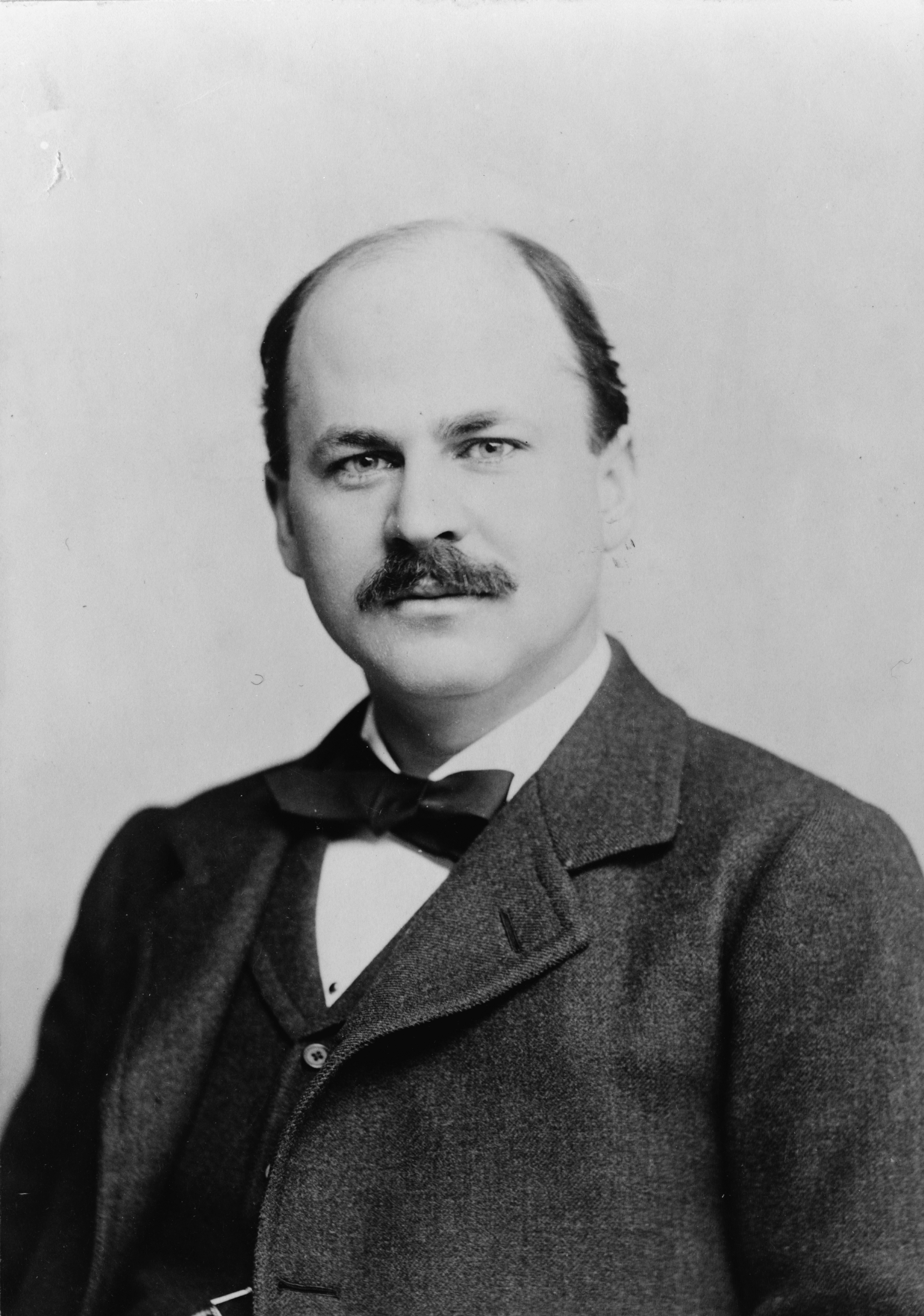
- Born: February 5, 1863; Boston, Massachusetts, U.S.
- Died: January 3, 1905 (aged 41); Locust Valley, Long Island, New York, U.S.
- Burial place: Forest Hill Cemetery, Boston, Massachusetts, U.S.
- Education: Harvard University 1885
- Occupation: Railroad President
- Employer: Long Island Rail Road

William Henry Baldwin Jr. (February 5, 1863 – January 3, 1905) was an American railroad executive and philanthropist. He was president of the Long Island Rail Road. and was instrumental in establishing African-American industrial education by securing donations from Northern industrial magnates. In 1894, he became a trustee of Tuskegee University and worked with Booker T. Washington.

== Early life ==
Baldwin was born in Boston, Massachusetts. He was the son of a prominent Bostonian and philanthropist, William Henry Baldwin Sr. He graduated from Harvard University in 1885 and studied law there for a year afterward.

== Railroad career ==
Baldwin's railroad career began through an invitation from Charles Francis Adams, president of the Union Pacific Railroad. Rather than completing law school, Baldwin started as an auditor's clerk in the Omaha, Nebraska office. He rose successively to a general agent for the Montana territory, assistant general freight agent for Union Pacific, and manager of the railroad's Leavenworth, Kansas, division.

In 1891, Baldwin found employment with Flint and Pere Marquette Railway, where he remained for two years. He then became the third vice president of the Southern Railway system. One of his challenges was the reorganization of the Richmond and Danville railway lines, enabling Southern to avoid bankruptcy. In a couple of years he was promoted to second vice president and general traffic manager.

In 1896, the directors of the Long Island Rail Road recruited Baldwin as president, replacing Austin Corbin who had died. The Long Island Rail Road grew significantly under his leadership. Because of his efforts, Atlantic Avenue in Brooklyn was resurfaced at the cost of $2,500,000. By eliminating around 100 grade crossings, this project made the train ride from Long Island to New York City 30 minutes quicker. When the Pennsylvania Railroad acquired the Long Island Rail Road, Baldwin continued as president of the LIRR.

== Black-American education ==
Baldwin was an original trustee of the Southern Education Board and became the first president of the General Education Board in 1902. In 1894, he became a trustee of Tuskegee University where he became "the intimate friend of Booker T. Washington, and one of his ablest, wisest and most faithful supporters." Baldwin's efforts at Tuskegee Institute (now Tuskegee University) were considered so important that during the 25th-anniversary ceremonies his name was inscribed onto the lawn in letters several feet long, along with those of Andrew Carnegie and President William Taft.

== Residence ==
In 1904, the new Baldwin home in Locust Valley, Long Island, was featured in Architects' & Builders' Magazine. This large, two-story house was designed by noted architect Bradford Lee Gilbert who also designed railroad stations for Baldwin. Described as "a simple type of New England Colonial architecture," the house was fabricated in cement with wood trim and a cypress shingle roof that was stained red. The Baldwin's home was located on a hill that overlooked Long Island Sound and was near the golf courses of the Nassau Club.

According to the article, "The rooms are large and commodious, and yet perfectly simple and dignified in their treatment and style." The house included six bedrooms and three bathrooms for the family on the second floor, as well as two guestrooms on the main level. Gilbert cleverly hid the water tank in a turret and positioned the house so the porches caught the summer's southwesterly breezes; he then placed the kitchen after the porches so the same breeze would carry away kitchen odors. Other features of the property include an elevator, a greenhouse, a stable, and a caretaker's cottage. A photo included in the article, shows that the Baldwin home had extensive grounds.

== Personal ==
On October 30, 1889, Baldwin married Ruth Standish Bowles of Springfield, Massachusetts, daughter of Samuel Bowles, the editor and owner of the Springfield Republican. They had three children: Ruth Standish Baldwin (born August 8, 1890, William Henry Baldwin III (born September 17, 1891), and Mary Chaffee Baldwin (1896–1897). Mrs. Baldwin joined him in his work for African-American education and was one of the founders of the National Urban League in 1910. Their daughter Ruth married the landscape painter John Fulton Folinsbee.

Baldwin died of intestinal cancer at his home in Locust Valley in 1905. He was buried in Forest Hill Cemetery in Boston following a private funeral in Glen Cove, New York. His memorial service was attended by many notables of the day, including William K. Vanderbilt and Andrew Carnegie. After his death the ferries operated by the Long Island Railroad flew their flags at half mast and the principal stations on the road were draped in black for several days.

| Preceded by Austin Corbin | President of Long Island Rail Road; 1896 – 1905 | Succeeded by William F. Potter |
