= James A. Michener Art Museum =

Museum in Doylestown, Pennsylvania

Michener Art Museum
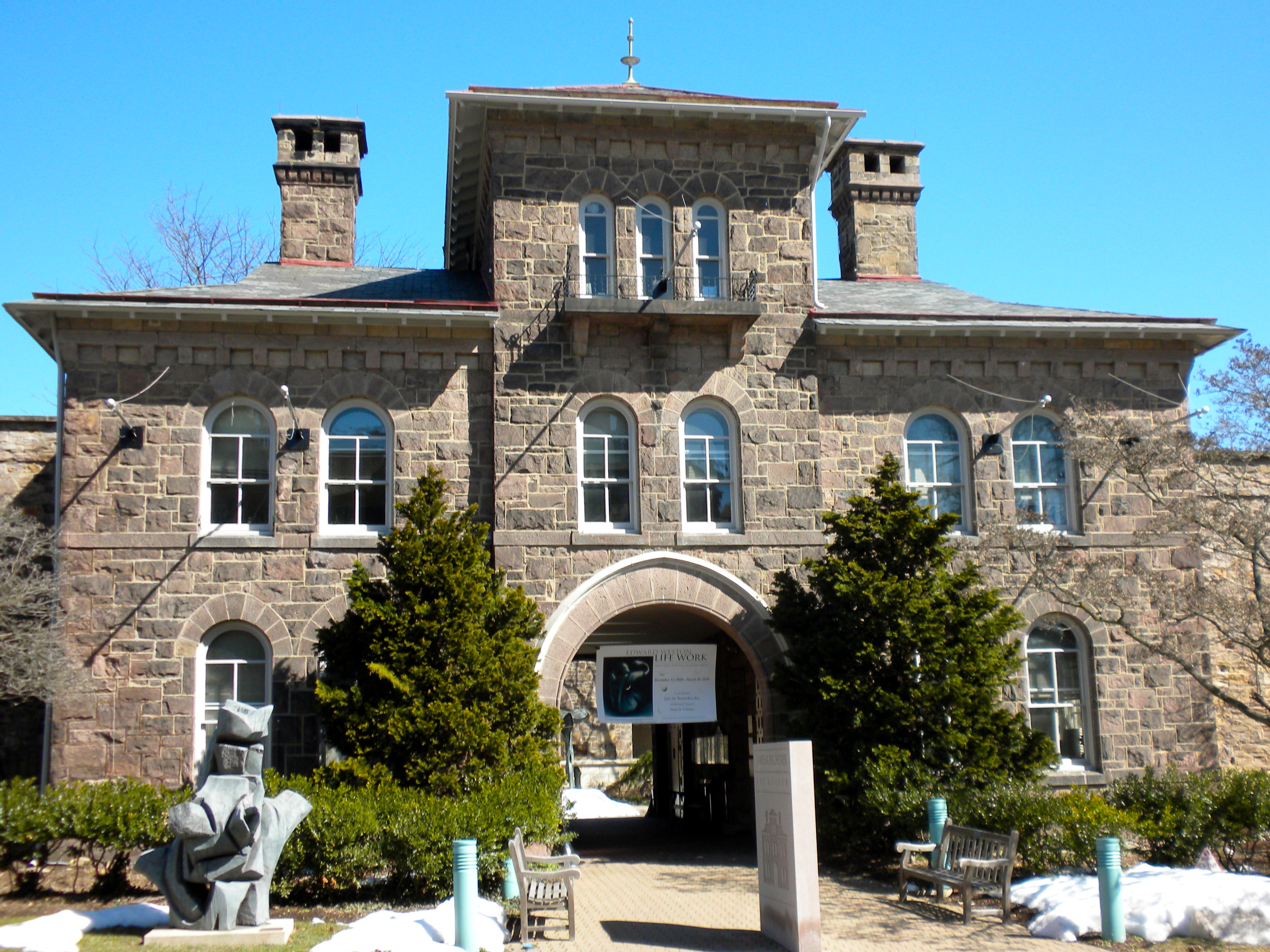
- James Michener Museum across the street from the Mercer Museum
- Interactive fullscreen map
- Established: 1988
- Location: 138 South Pine Street; Doylestown, PA 18901 United States
- Coordinates: 40°18′31″N 75°07′35″W
- Type: Art, sculpture garden
- Visitors: 135,000 annually
- Curators: Laura Turner Igoe, Ph.D.
- Public transit access: Doylestown: Lansdale/Doylestown Line SEPTA bus: 55
- Website: www.michenerartmuseum.org

The Michener Art Museum is a private, non-profit museum that is located in Doylestown, Bucks County, Pennsylvania. Founded in 1988, it was named for the Pulitzer Prize–winning writer James A. Michener, a Doylestown resident.

Situated within the old stone walls of an historic nineteenth-century jail, it houses a collection of Bucks County visual arts, along with holdings of nineteenth- and twentieth-century American art, and is noted for its Pennsylvania Impressionism collection and an art colony centered in nearby New Hope, during the early 20th century, as well as its changing exhibitions, ranging from international touring shows to regionally focused exhibitions.

== Facility ==
The museum has 40,000 square feet (3,700 m^{2}) of public space, including a landscaped courtyard, a glass-enclosed, state-of-the-art event pavilion, an outdoor sculpture garden and terrace built in the original jailyard, seminar and conference facilities, a museum shop and café, and the George Nakashima Reading Room. The Martin Wing includes preparation areas and collection storage spaces.

== History ==
The idea of a museum in Doylestown dedicated to the works of the Pennsylvania Impressionists has been around at least since 1949, when local artist Walter Emerson Baum founded an informal committee along with Bucks County Superintendent of Schools Dr. Charles H. Boehm, and The Daily Intelligencer editor George Hotchkiss to explore the possibilities of the establishment of such an institution.

In the 1970s, Bucks County commissioners established the Bucks County Council on the Arts, an agency set up to manage federal funded artwork intended to be included in government building projects. Some of the artwork they collected was put on display at their headquarters in the Neshaminy Manor office in Doylestown Township. In 1974, the council also helped establish a mobile art exhibit, the "Artmobile" of Bucks County Community College.

In mid-1988, the Bucks County commissioners approved $650,000 to build an art museum in the recently closed Bucks County Jail. Bucks County Council on the Arts became the organization charged with running the institution and their collected works became part of the museum collection. James A. Michener, who grew up in Doylestown, took the lead in establishing the endowment, donating $500,000 as well as some of the paintings from his own private collection (Michener would go on to donate a total of $8.5 million to the museum). The site was renovated by architects O’Donnell & Naccarato, Inc., from Doylestown, Pennsylvania. The warden's house and the control buildings were converted to office space and exhibition space. Part of the jail walls remain, which now provide a backdrop to the museum's outdoor sculpture and event pavilion. The museum was named the James A. Michener Art Museum, and opened to the public on September 15, 1988, at a ceremony presided over by Michener and his wife, Mari Sabusawa Michener.

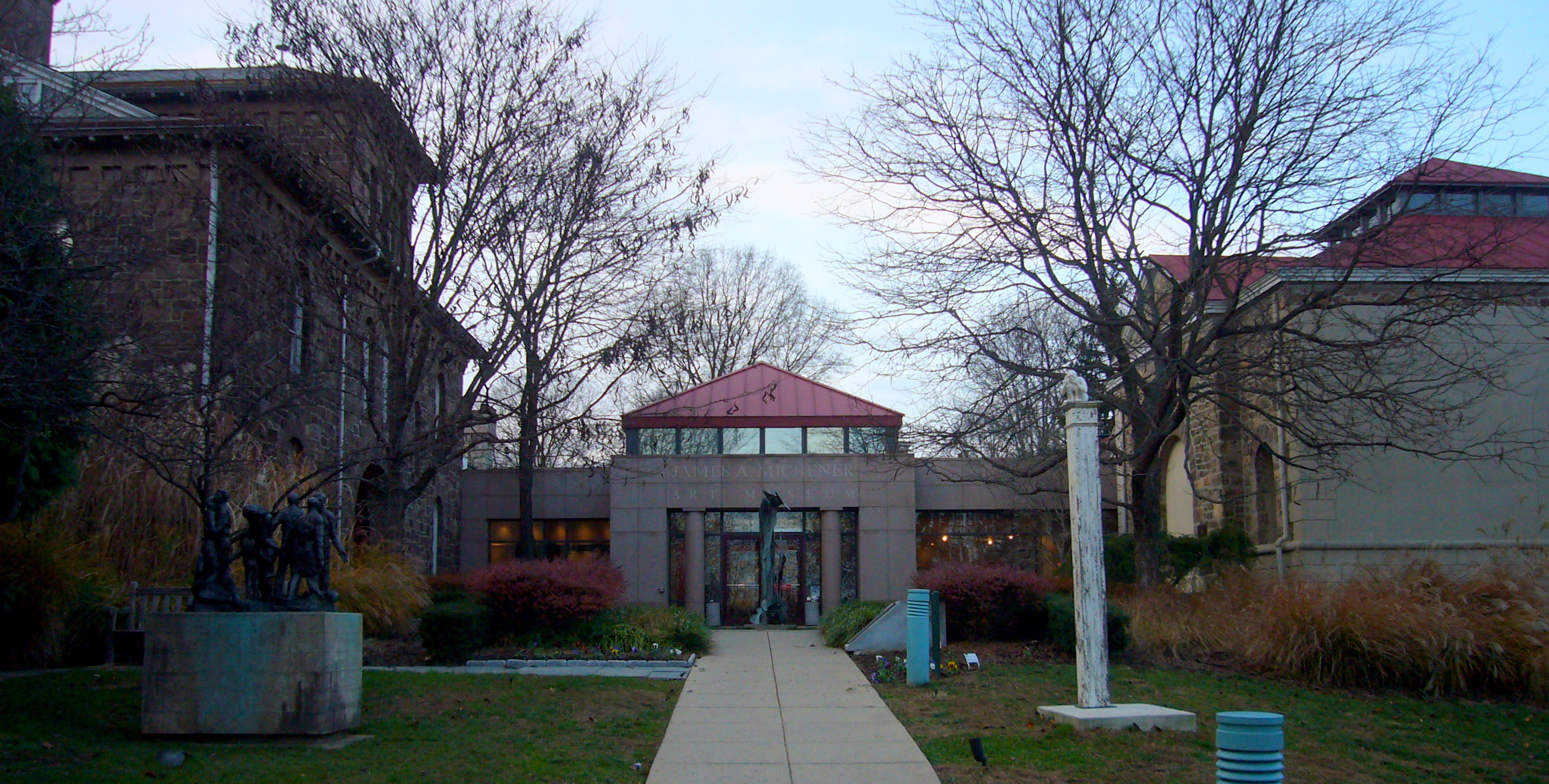
Courtyard of the museum

In 1993, the museum had its first major expansion designed by Lynn Taylor Associates from Doylestown, Pennsylvania which included larger exhibitions galleries and a storage vault. A few years later, in 1996, the museum had its second major expansion which included the installation of the Mari Sabusawa Michener Wing, also designed by Lynn Taylor Associates. In 1999, there was a major expansion in the museums collection when Gerry and Marguerite Lenfest donated 54 Pennsylvania Impressionist paintings along with $3 million for the museum's endowment. In 2007, the museum opened the Syd and Sharon Martin Wing, designed by architects RMJM Hillier from Princeton, NJ. This included a new 5,000-square-foot (460 m^{2}) gallery space and additional administrative offices.

The museum opened the new Edgar N. Putman Event Pavilion designed by KieranTimberlake, from Philadelphia, Pennsylvania. This new 2,700-square-foot (250 m^{2}) all-glass structure with a solid roof and sliding doors on its east and west sides hosts Jazz Nights, lectures and special events.

The Michener opened a satellite site in 2003, in New Hope, Pennsylvania, designed by architects Minno & Wasko. This facility closed in 2009.

=== The Jail ===
The Bucks County Jail, once on the site of the Michener Art Museum, originally opened in 1884. Philadelphia architect Addison Hutton designed an expanded facility that included a three-story warden's house and guardhouse control center in a “T” shape, using a combination of Italianate and Romanesque Revival styles. The architecture was inspired by Quaker ideas of reflection and penitence that dominated the American prison system in the nineteenth century. The overall design concept of the jail was modeled after the Eastern State Penitentiary in Philadelphia, built in 1829. The Bucks County Jail closed in 1985. The warden's house is a significant contributing property in the Doylestown Historic District; it was listed on the National Register of Historic Places in 1985.

== Collection ==
The museum collection includes more than 2,700 paintings, sculptures and works on paper from the Bucks County visual arts tradition, dating from colonial times to the present. The collection includes works by painters of the Pennsylvania Impressionist or New Hope school, American primitive painters, limners and modernists. Works by abstract expressionists are on long-term loan from the Jack S. Blanton Museum of Art, University of Texas at Austin, where James A. Michener and his wife, Mari, donated a major portion of their private art collection. In addition to the permanent exhibitions, the museum presents fifteen changing exhibitions each year. These exhibitions feature a broad spectrum of artistic styles and mediums.

=== Pennsylvania Impressionism ===
The museum has a collection of works by painters of the school of Pennsylvania Impressionism, a movement from the first half of the twentieth century centered on Bucks County, Pennsylvania. Artists in this movement include John Fulton Folinsbee, Walter Emerson Baum, George Sotter, Nate Dunn, Fern Coppedge, Edward Redfield, Daniel Garber and Walter E. Schofield. Similar to the French impressionist movement, this artwork is characterized by a plein air style interested in the quality of color, light, and the time of day.

== Selected collection highlights ==
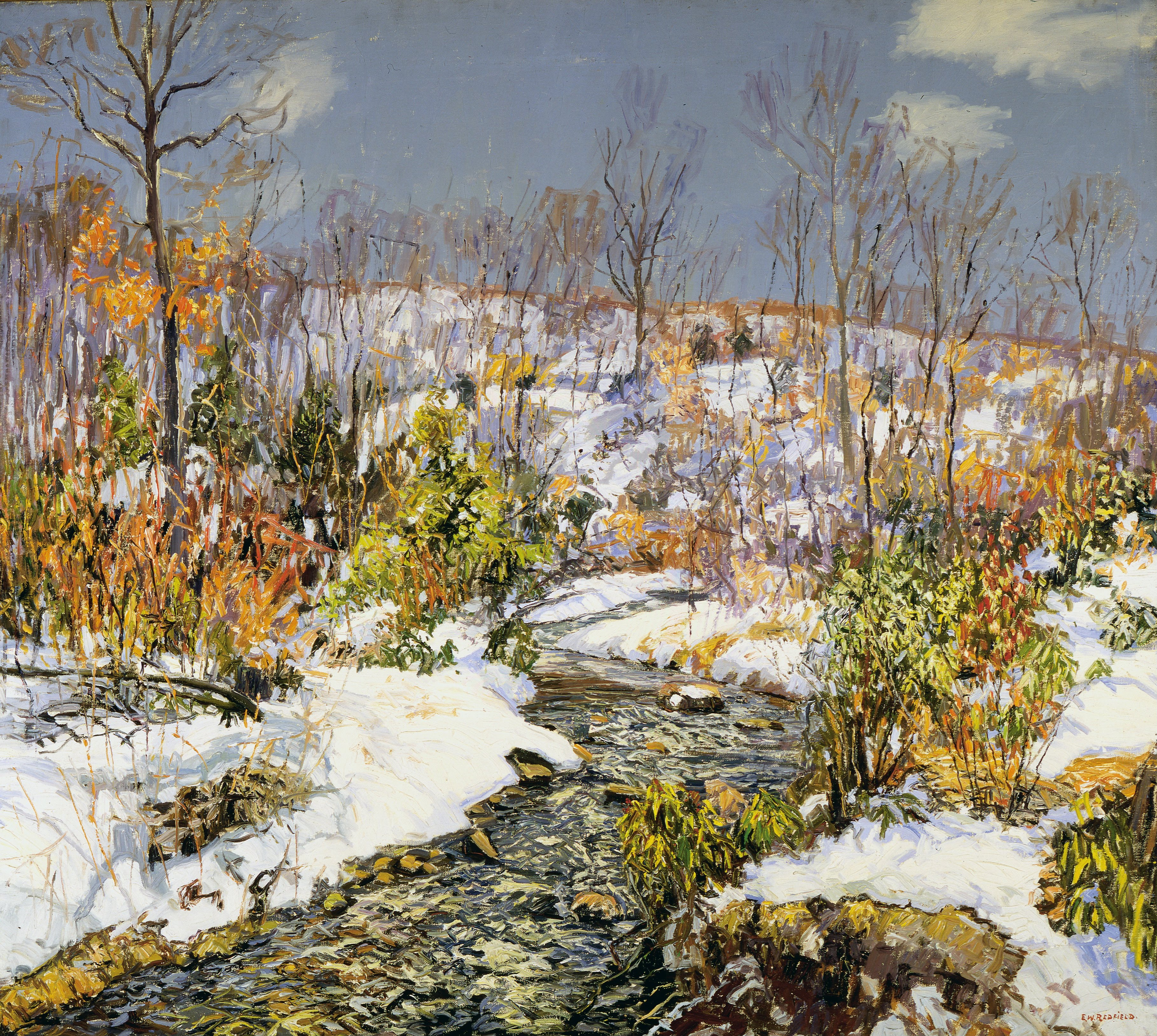
Edward Willis Redfield

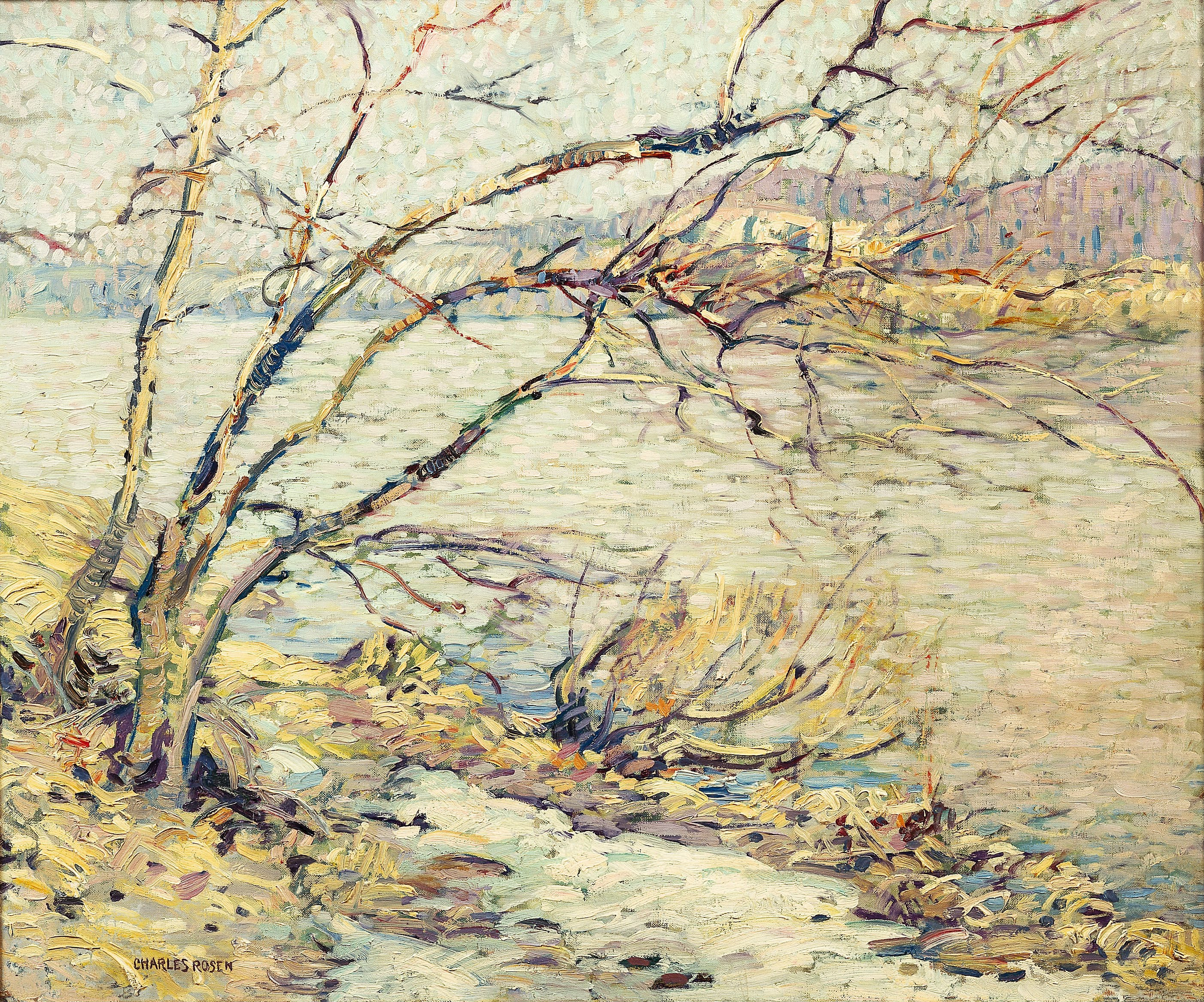
Charles Rosen

== Education ==
The museum presents ongoing adult lecture series and workshops that feature art scholars and artists. There are also children's classes and workshops for children preschool age through high school, inter-generational classes, and school and teacher programs planned in coordination with the area school districts, offered both in the museum and on site at schools. An extensive archival collection that documents the work of regional artists, both past and present, is preserved and maintained by the museum.

== The Bucks County Artists Database ==
The museum has an online interactive database of artists from the Bucks County region, also available to be viewed on a kiosk in its Family Education Center. This database contains more than 1700 pages of information and more than 1300 images relating to 371 architects, craftspersons, musicians, painters, photographers, poets, printmakers, sculptors, stage and screen artists and fiction and non-fiction writers from the artistic tradition of New Hope and Bucks County. Some examples of artists featured are the Quaker painter Edward Hicks (1780–1849), master woodworker George Nakashima (1905–1990), sculptor Raymond Granville Barger (1906–2001), and authors and illustrators Stan and Jan Berenstain.

== Permanent exhibits ==
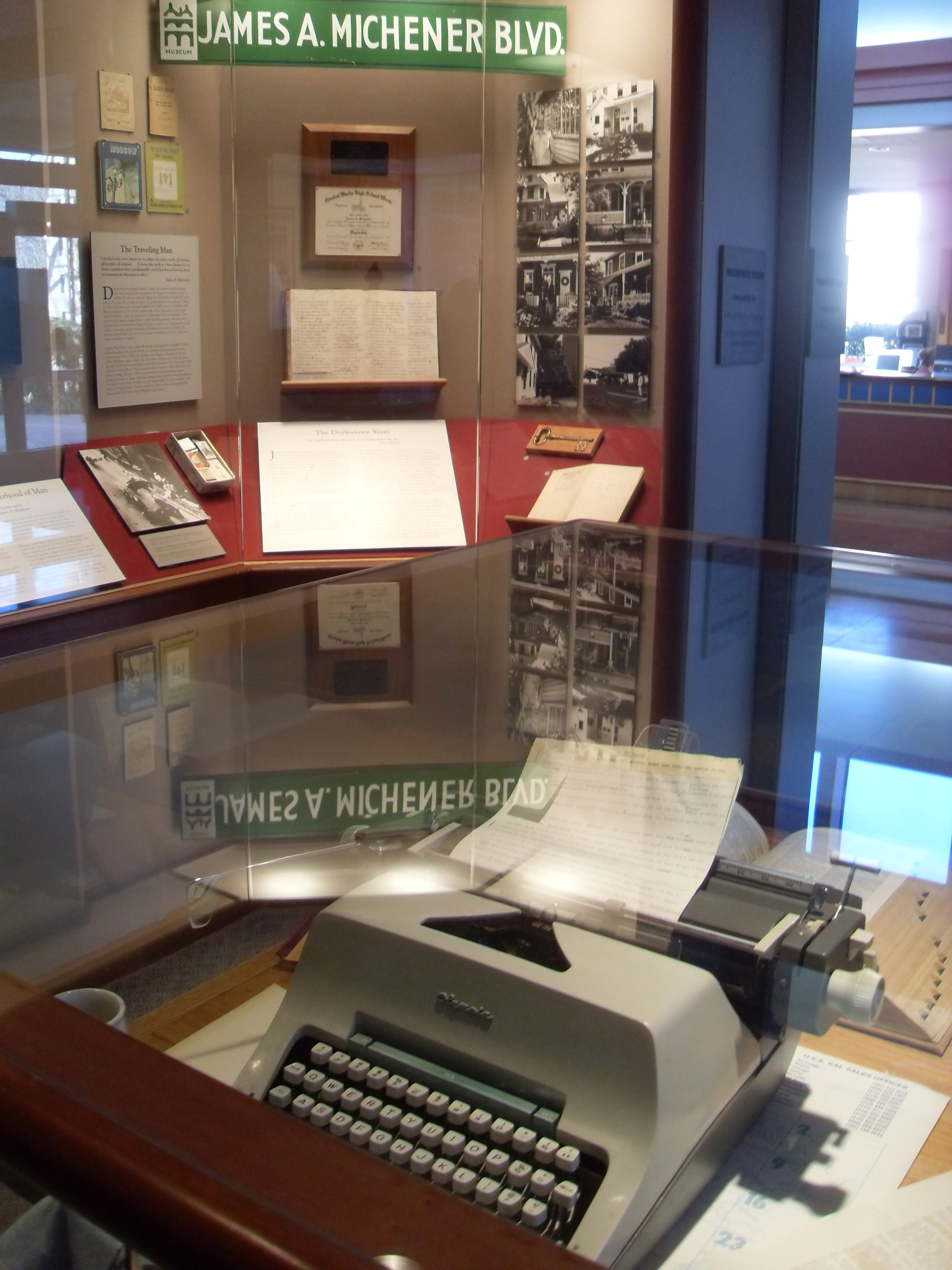
Michener memorabilia

- The Lenfest Exhibition of Pennsylvania Impressionism
- The George Nakashima Reading Room
- Daniel Garber's A Wooded Watershed (22-foot mural painted for the Sesquicentennial Exposition of 1926 held in Philadelphia)
- Intelligent Design: Studio Craft + Tradition
- "James A. Michener: A Living Legacy" - an exhibit dedicated to the museum's namesake, James A. Michener. This exhibit recreates his Bucks County office where he wrote Tales of the South Pacific. The exhibit features the desk, chair, typewriter, dictionary and other objects from the office in James A. Michener's Bucks County home where he lived and worked for more than 35 years.
