= Jeannette Carter =

African-American lawyer and political activist

- Jeannette Carter and flag used by John Brown on his attack on Harpers Ferry, August 1938
- Born: 1886; Harrisburg, Pennsylvania, U.S.
- Died: 1964 (aged 77–78)
- Education: Howard University
- Occupation: Lawyer

Jeannette Carter (1886–1964) was an American lawyer, labor organizer, and suffragist. She was the first African-American woman in Washington, D.C., to be a notary.

== Biography ==
Carter was born in 1886 in Harrisburg, Pennsylvania. She attended Howard University School of Law from 1908 through 1912. Carter started her practice in the Washington, D.C. area, working as a pension and claim attorney. She was appointed a notary public, becoming the first African-American woman in Washington, D.C. to be a notary.

Around the turn of the century Carter was an organizer of the Niagara Movement.

Carter was involved in a variety of advocacy roles. She was part of the African-American women's club movement. In 1917 Carter along with Mary Church Terrell and Julia F. Coleman formed the "Women's Wage Earner's Association" (WWEA) which advocated specifically for African-American women workers. In 1918 she served as president of the WWEA. She went on to be appointed as the director of the "Colored Bureau of Industrial Housing and Transportation" which fell under the auspices of the United States Department of Labor (DOL). Carter joined the lobby called "National Colored Women's Legislative Bureau" in 1921. In 1923 Carter founded the "Women's Republican National Political Study Club" and through that organization she established the magazine the Political Recorder and then the Women's Voice.

Carter died in 1964.
