= George Sotter =

American painter

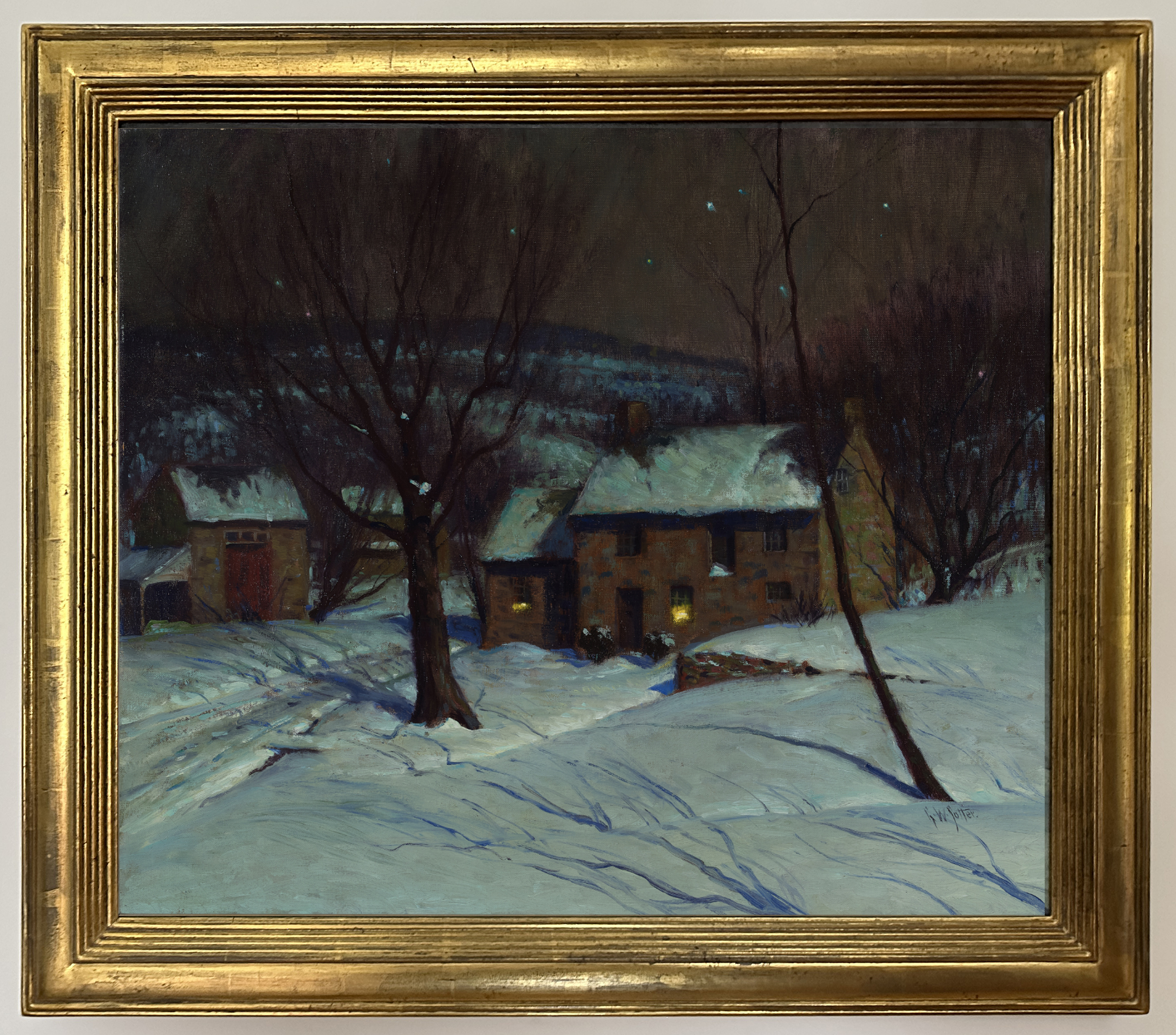
George Sotter, "Winter Night, oil on canvas, 22" x 26"

George W. Sotter (1879 – 1953) was an American painter best known for Impressionist-style works. He was born and raised in Pittsburgh, Pennsylvania but eventually made his name in Philadelphia. He is also known for his work in stained glass, some of which are still installed in numerous churches. Sotter studied art at the Pennsylvania Academy with artist and teacher Edward Redfield, 1869–1965, member of the regional New Hope group. Later, Sotter became a member of the faculty at Carnegie Mellon University, 1910–1919.

In the August 5, 2006 episode of Antiques Roadshow on PBS, filmed in Philadelphia, a Sotter oil painting was appraised at $120,000 to $180,000, much to the delight of its visibly stunned owner.
