= Morgan Colt =

American metalworker and painter

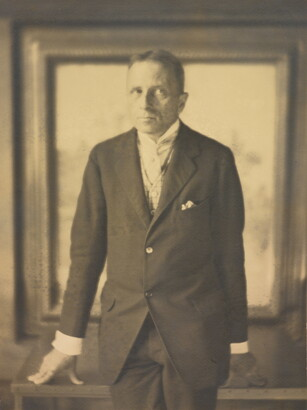
- Colt, c. 1920. by Clara E. Sipprell
- Born: 11 September 1876; Summit, New Jersey, US
- Died: 12 June 1926 (aged 49); New Hope, Pennsylvania, US
- Resting place: Paterson, New Jersey, U.S.
- Education: Columbia University
- Occupations: Metalworker, painter, woodworker, and architect
- Organization: The New Hope Group
- Known for: Pennsylvania Impressionism
- Notable work: Little English Village in New Hope, Pennsylvania
- Movement: Arts and Crafts

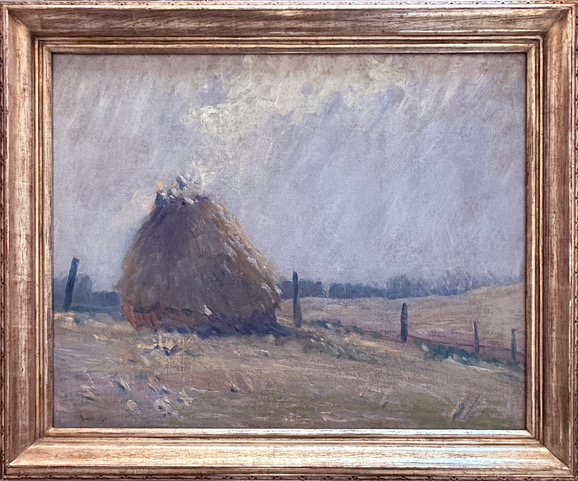
Morgan Colt, "Haystacks," 1913, 25 3/4" x 31 1/2," Oil on Canvas

Morgan Colt (11 September 1876 – 12 June 1926) was an American metalworker, furniture craftsman, impressionist painter, and architect. He helped found the New Hope, Bucks County, Pennsylvania colony of painters—the leading landscape school in the United States during the early 20th–century—but was better known as a craftsman than a painter, specializing in hand–wrought iron garden furniture and fire screens. Many of his paintings were accidentally destroyed after his death.

== Early life ==
Morgan Colt was born in Summit, New Jersey to Morgan Gibbs and Mary (Borrowe) Colt. His father was a member of the Colt gun manufacturing family and his grandfather was Roswell L. Colt. He attended the School of Architecture at Columbia University, graduating in 1901. While at Columbia, he was a member of the Fraternity of Delta Psi (St. Anthony Hall). He also studied art at the Academie Julian in Paris and with painter William Langson Lathrop in Bucks County, Pennsylvania.

== Career ==
=== Architect ===
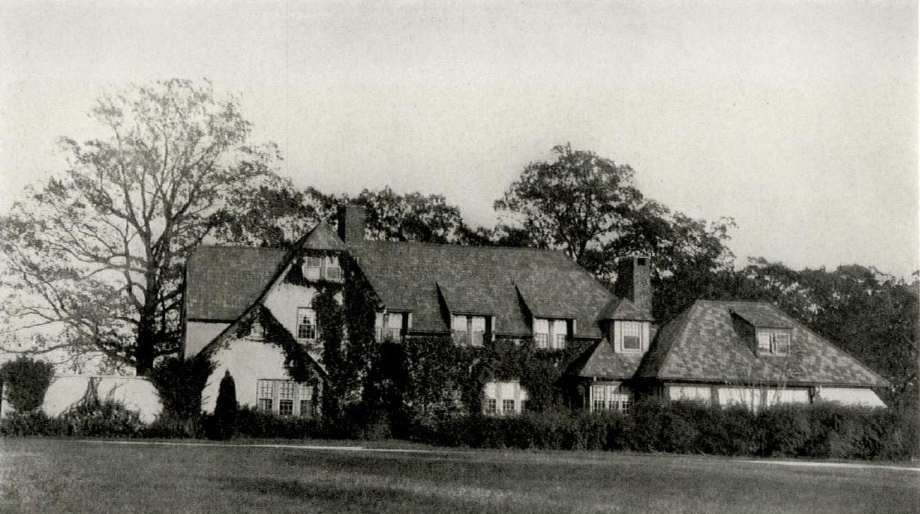
Jane Wood residence in 1923

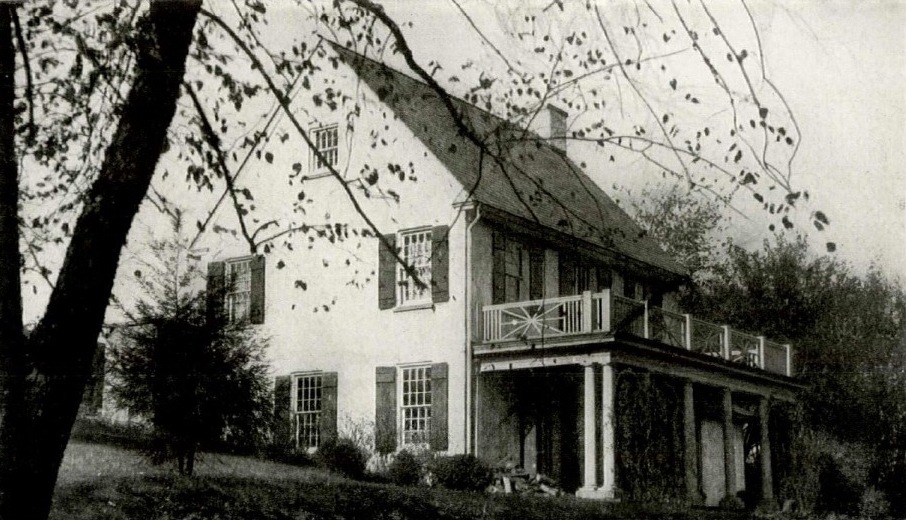
Robert F. Welsh residence in 1923

Colt qualified as an architect and practiced this profession in New York City. Around 1905, he began specializing in houses featuring hand–crafted wood and iron furniture. One of his designs was the White Oaks, the c. 1900 country mansion of Jane Wood (Mrs. G. E. Wood), later the Holmquist School for Girls (1925), and now the Hotel du Village in Bucks County, Pennsylvania. He also designed a house in New Hope, Pennsylvania for Robert W. Welsh. Both houses, as well as his own residence in New Hope, were featured in The Architectural Record in 1923.

In 1924, he designed a house for John Folinsbee, including designing the doors, ironwork, and lighting. He also designed an Episcopal Community Center in Wrightstown, Pennsylvania. In addition, he designed the altar, candle holders, and lectern for St. Philips Chapel on River Road in New Hope sometime after 1921.

=== Little English Village ===
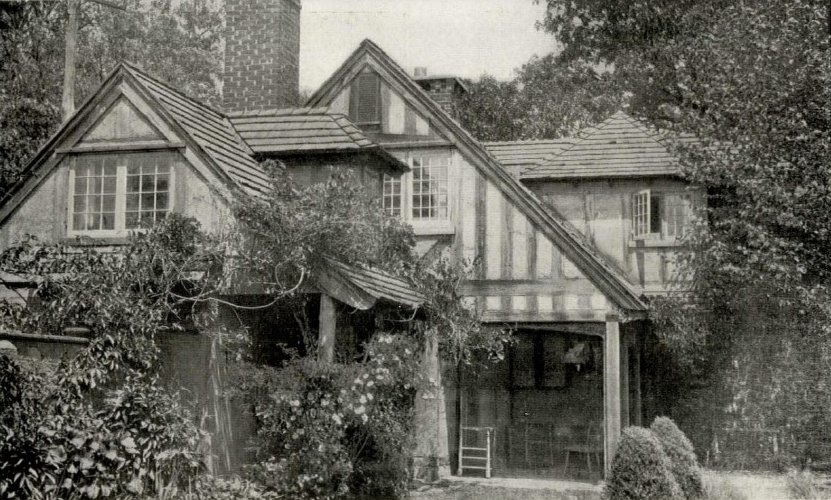
Colt residence at the Little English Village in 1923

Colt was influenced by William Morris and the Arts and Crafts movement in England, and began designing and making wood and iron furniture using traditional techniques. Around 1912, he moved to New Hope, Pennsylvania where he began building a "Little English Village" which consisted of eight cottages of various English architectural styles. The primary structure was his residence, a former barn that he converted into a Tudor Revival style house. It featured carved woodwork and doors, leaded glass windows, and a slate roof. One admirer said, "The one–time pig pen has budded, leaved and blossomed into one of the most charming abodes a vivid fancy could imagine. The woodwork of its doorways are enriched with exquisite Gothic detail, and its walls are festooned with vines and carvings wrought in the stone."

Colt added a gatehouse cottage which connected to a large Medieval iron gate and gateway at the front of his property, followed by a stable (later the Inn at Phillips Mill). He also built his Gothic Revival style artist studio where he painted. The studio was built using the wooden trusses of a ruined English abbey that Coly dismantled and shipped to New Hope. Across from the studio, he built a Gothic Revival iron forge where he crafted iron furniture. He also built a brick Tudor Revival style woodworking shop where he made wood furniture and chests detailed with Gothic–style tracery. Across from the woodworking shop, he built a Norman Revival cottage which he used as his dog kennel. The grounds included brick walkways and a sunken garden that he designed.

In 1919, he added more buildings to the Little English Village that he called the Gothic Shops; there he exhibited and sold his garden furniture, ornamental ironwork, tooled copper, leather work, and carved wood chests, doors, and painted furniture. He also sold custom-order fireplace implements, folding screens, lighting, and metal trays. All items were made on site by Colt or his employees. His workers also were batiks, handweavers, picture framers, and rug makers.

=== Art ===
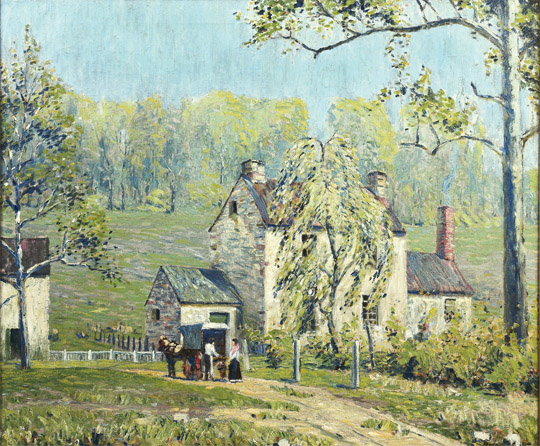
Colt's Butcher Wagon (1920)

In addition to his traditional crafts, Colt also painted in oils, favoring coastal views of Shinnecock, Long Island, and landscapes of Bucks County in the impressionist style.

In 1916, Colt joined William Langson Lathrop, Rae Sloan Bredin, Daniel Garber, Charles Rosen, and Robert Spencer to form The New Hope Group. He exhibited with the New Hope Group in 1916 and 1917 at the Arlington Gallery in New York City, Carnegie Institute, Cincinnati Art Museum, Corcoran Gallery of Art, and the Detroit Institute of Art.

He also exhibited at the Art Institute of Chicago, the National Academy of Design, the Pennsylvania Academy of the Fine Arts, and Phillips Mill. At the time of his death, he was preparing for an exhibit with Architectural Society of New York.

== Legacy ==
In addition to Colt's paintings, examples of his furniture and wooden chests are in museums and private collections. However, after Colt's death, the purchaser of his property destroyed most of the paintings he found there, not understanding what they were worth. As modern art historians have noted, this had made it difficult to find his paintings today and to understand the scope of his work.

Colt's house and outbuildings in New Hope are now part of the Phillips Mill Historic District, listed on the National Register of Historic Places in 1983. In 2020, the Phillips Mill Foundation for the Arts announced a campaign had raised $425,000 to restore Colt's former residence and buildings.

== Personal life ==
In 1902, Colt married Jane Boudinot Keith, a preacher's daughter from Onteora, New York, and descendant of Elias Boudinot, a French Huguenot who was president of the Continental Congress. Jane's sister, Mary was married to John Brooks Leavitt.

They did not have any children. They initially lived in Flushing, Queens, New York and frequently visited Shinnecock, Long Island. Around 1912, they moved to New Hope, Pennsylvania, so Colt could dedicate his time to art. He built a houseboat, the Deewaydin, planning to live on it on the Delaware Canal. That turned out not to be practical. They moved into a rental house and later purchased, a barn that had housed pigs on the Phillips Mill farm of his friend, William Langson Lathrop, and converted it into a home and studio.

In 1912, he organized the Coryell's Ferry Chautauqua near New Hope; the weeklong event recurred annually for ten years. He was a member of the Boston Art Club, the New York Society of Craftsmen, the New York Yacht Club, the Philadelphia Art Alliance, and the Salmagundi Club. He also raised German Shepherd show dogs.

In 1926, Colt died of apoplexy at the Art Colony at New Hope, Pennsylvania at the age of 49 years. He was buried in Paterson, New Jersey.

== See also ==
Pennsylvania Impressionism

== External sources ==
Morgan Colt at Find a Grave

- Artworks of Morgan Colt, Mutual Art
