= Mary Elizabeth Price =

American painter

M. Elizabeth Price
- Born: Mary Elizabeth Price; March 1, 1877; Martinsburg, West Virginia
- Died: February 19, 1965 (aged 87); Trenton, New Jersey
- Resting place: Solebury Friends Meeting House cemetery, Solebury, Pennsylvania
- Education: Pennsylvania School of Industrial Arts; Pennsylvania Academy of the Fine Arts
- Known for: Gold leaf oil paintings
- Awards: National Academy of Design; 1927 Carnegie Prize

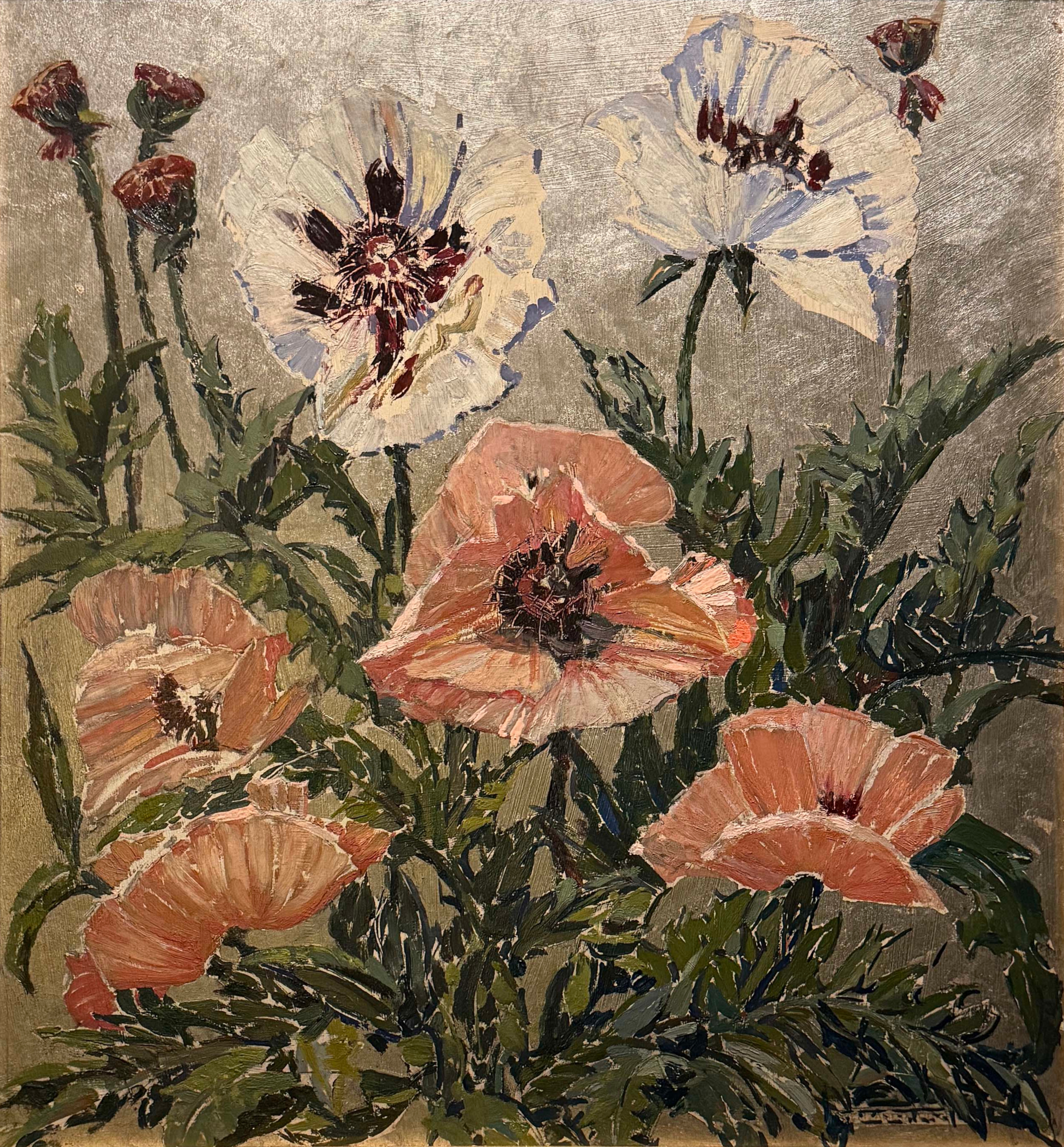
"Poppies White and Pink," oil with silver leaf on masonite, 20" x 18," by Mary Elizabeth Price

Mary Elizabeth Price (March 1, 1877 – February 19, 1965), also known as M. Elizabeth Price, was an American Impressionist painter. She was an early member of the Philadelphia Ten, organizing several of the group's exhibitions. She steadily exhibited her works with the Pennsylvania Academy of the Fine Arts, the National Academy of Design, and other organizations over the course of her career. She was one of the several family members who entered the field of art as artists, dealers, or framemakers.

== Early life ==
Mary Elizabeth Price was born in 1877 in Martinsburg, West Virginia. Her parents were Quakers Reuben Moore and Caroline Cooper Paxson Price who lived in Shenandoah, Virginia. Price spent her childhood in Virginia, West Virginia, and then most of her childhood in Solebury Township, north of New Hope where her mother was born. She had a sister, Alice, and three brothers, Frederick Newlin, Rueben Moore, and Carroll Price. M. Elizabeth Price graduated from the Friends' Central School.

== Education ==
Price studied from about 1896 to 1904 at the Pennsylvania Museum and School of Industrial Art and from about 1904 to 1907 at the Pennsylvania Academy of the Fine Arts under Hugh Breckenridge and Daniel Garber. She took private lessons from William Langson Lathrop.

== Career ==
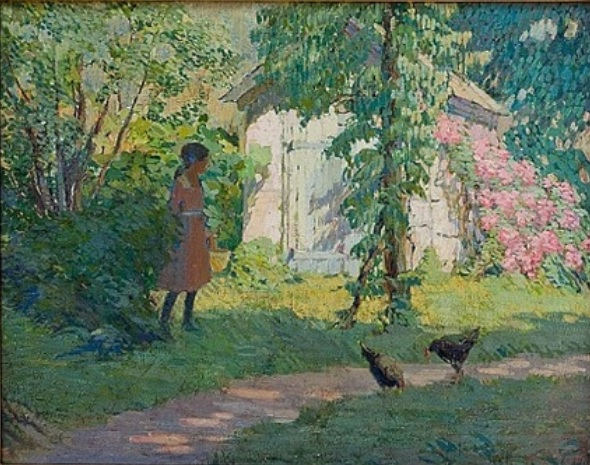
M. Elizabeth Price, Picking Flowers, 1916

=== Instructor ===
Price was in New York in 1917 when she taught art to children who attended public schools at the Neighborhood Art School of Greenwich House. The program was funded by Mrs. Harry Payne Whitney to teach children painting, drawing, pottery, wood carving, and sculpting. In the winter of 1919–1920, Price exhibited the children's work, as part of an art education campaign with other schools, at the suggestion of Carnegie Institute of Technology in Pittsburgh.

=== Works ===
Inspired by the painters from Siena and Florence during the Italian Renaissance, Price is best known for her floral still life paintings which used gold and silver leaf. Her works were created by first applying red clay and gesso to wooden panels. Metal leaf was added and then oils painted on the panels of figures or flowers. She created large gilded panels with this technique. "Her work combines a Sienese delicacy of line with a modern freedom in the use of color," wrote a New York Times critic. Examples of such work, including Mallows (1929) and Delphinium Pattern (ca. 1933), were included in The Painterly Voice: Bucks County's Fertile Ground, a 2011 exhibition of the James A. Michener Art Museum. She also painted landscapes, genre scenes, and ships, including a unique series of Spanish treasure ships. One of her floral paintings, made c. 1930 of a Marsh Mallow, was appraised at $40,000 to $60,000 by Robin Starr on the PBS Antiques Roadshow in 2011.

She created murals of 18th and 19th-century needlework samplers in 1931 with Lucille Howard, who she shared a studio and was also a member of the Philadelphia Ten. The murals were made for the clubhouse of the American Woman's Association in New York at 353 West 57th Street. A still life painting of fruit is owned by Smith College and was hung in the Jordan House in 1922.

=== Exhibitions ===
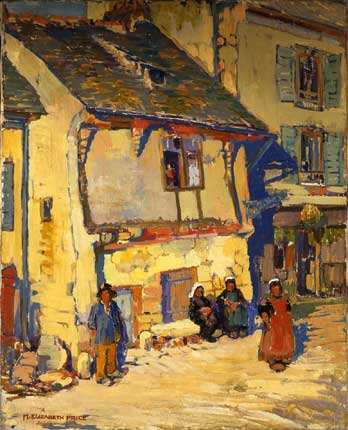
M.Elizabeth Price, The Wine Shop, Quimperle, Brittany, oil on canvas, by 1921

She exhibited her works in 1914 at the Pennsylvania Academy of the Fine Arts and in Washington, D.C. at the Corcoran Gallery of Art Biennial. She continued to exhibit at the Pennsylvania Academy annually for most years between 1917 and 1943. Between 1921 and 1934, Price exhibited 16 times at the National Academy of Design, where in 1927 she won the Carnegie Prize for best oil painting by an American artist, for her depiction of sixteenth-century Spanish galleons. Her work was exhibited in the National Association of Women Painters and Sculptors' Fiftieth Anniversary Exhibition 1889–1939 in New York. She also exhibited at several other venues in the United States over her career.

=== Membership ===
As an early member of the Philadelphia Ten, a group of women artists begun in 1921, she organized exhibits and participated in solo and group shows in many galleries in New York City, Philadelphia and Washington, D.C., including Grand Central Art Galleries, the Whitney Museum of American Art, the Pennsylvania Academy of the Fine Arts, the Corcoran Gallery of Art and the National Academy of Design. Between 1920 and 1927, Price was the chair of the exhibition committee for the National Association of Women Painters and Sculptors and arranged 32 exhibitions across America, and in Buenos Aires and Rio de Janeiro. She was also a member of the Pennsylvania Academy of Fine Arts fellowship, American Woman's Association, American Artists Professional League, the Art Alliance of Philadelphia, Allied Artists of America, Fine Arts Society of Arkansas, Phillips Mill Community Art Association, and The Plastic Club.

== Price family ==
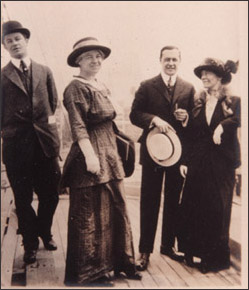
Frederick Price, M. Elizabeth Price, Rae Bredin and Alice Price Bredin aboard ship.

One of Price's brothers, Frederick, generally known as F. Newlin Price, owned the Ferargil Gallery in New York. It sold many Impressionist artists paintings, including those from Pennsylvania, from 1914 to 1955.

Her sister, Alice, was an artist and brother R. Moore Price was an artist, framemaker, and art dealer. His wife, Elizabeth Freedley Price, was an Impressionist painter. Her sister married Rae Sloan Bredin, another American impressionist painter living in New Hope, Pennsylvania. Her brother, Reuben Moore Price, was a member of the Bucks County arts and crafts frame making movement. Carroll, and his wife Edith, remained on the Solebury Township family farm.

== New Hope, Pennsylvania ==
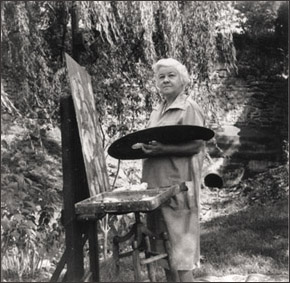
M. Elizabeth Price at her easel

Price lived much of her early artistic life in New York City and then returned to Bucks County in New Hope, Pennsylvania in late the 1920s. She lived in Pumpkin Seed, an old yellow stone cottage, named for its size and color. The cottage, situated along a canal, had been rented by F. Newlin for several years. M. Elizabeth Price said of it, "When I first saw the original cottage it was painted such a vivid yellow that I instinctively thought of a pumpkin; and it was so small that I named it Pumpkin Seed more in derision than anything else. But the quaintness of the name grew on us so that we've learned to love it." She grew a garden of irises, mallows, peonies, lilies, delphiniums, poppies, hollyhocks, and gladioli that she used as subjects for her paintings. She lived there for the rest of her life with her brother, who owned a house, farm, and property in the New Hope area. She gave lectures to the New Hope Women's Club, where she showed her paintings and encouraged local artists.

== Death ==
Mary Elizabeth Price died in Trenton, New Jersey on February 19, 1965 at Mercer Hospital. At the time of her death, she was a member of the Solebury Friends Meeting and, at the age of 87, had been the last living of the Price children. She was survived by her nieces and nephews. Price is buried in the Solebury Friends Meeting House cemetery.

Her papers are archived at the Smithsonian American Art Museum and National Portrait Gallery Library.

== Selected works ==
- Bathing Along the Delaware River, private collection
- By the Laita, Quimperle, France, by 1921
- Bouquet
- Butterfly Weed No. 1, by 1929
- Cheerful Barge, oil on canvas, by 1929, private collection
- Delphinium and Black Pinks, by 1929
- Doorway to the Vineyard, Palazzo Afflitto, Italy, by 1921
- The Fountain, Ravello, Italy, by 1921
- Freight Boats, Menaggio, Italy, by 1921
- Gladioli and Japanese Iris
- House on the Hill, Quimperle, France, by 1921
- House of Jeanne, Quimperle, France, by 1921
- Ladies of the Villa d'Este
- Lavandieres, Quimperle, France, by 1921
- Market Day in Guingamp, France, by 1921
- The McGill Farm above New Hope, watercolor, private collection
- No. 1 Fuchsia, by 1929
- Picking Potatoes, oil on canvas, ca. 1933, private collection
- Sabot Market, Guingamp, France, by 1921
- Saint Aignan, Pig Market, France, by 1921
- Southern Magnolia, private collection
- Valley of the Delaware, oil on canvas, private collection
- Vase with White Poppies, James A Michener Museum, Doyleston, Pennsylvania
- A Villa on Lake Como, Italy, by 1921
- Village Queen, by 1929
- The Well Diggers, by 1929
- Wine Shop, Quimperle, France, by 1921, James A Michener Museum, Doyleston, Pennsylvania
- The Yacht Race
