= Charles Rosen (painter) =

American painter

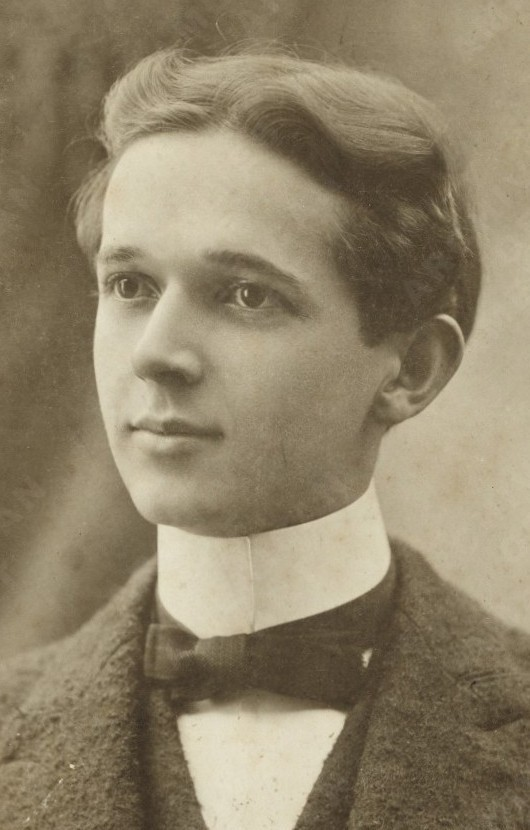
- Charles Rosen c. 1900
- Born: 28 April 1878; Reagantown, Westmoreland County, Pennsylvania, U.S.
- Died: 21 June 1950 (aged 72); Kingston, New York, U.S.
- Occupation: Painter

Charles Rosen (28 April 1878 – 21 June 1950) was an American painter who lived for many years in Woodstock, New York. In the 1910s he was acclaimed for his Impressionist winter landscapes. He became dissatisfied with this style and around 1920 he changed to a radically different cubist-realist (Precisionism) style. He became recognized as one of the leaders of the Woodstock artists colony.

== Early years ==
Charles Rosen was born on a farm in Reagantown, Westmoreland County, Pennsylvania on 28 April 1878. When he was sixteen he opened a photographic studio in West Newton, Pennsylvania in the coal mining region in the west of the state. Most of his photographs were of deceased miners. Rosen then worked for a photography business in Salem, Ohio, and in 1898 moved to New York City. He planned to become a newspaper illustrator. He studied painting at the National Academy of Design under Francis Coates Jones. He also took classes at the New York School of Art under William Merritt Chase and Frank DuMond. He became interested in landscape painting in 1902 at DuMond's outdoor classes in Old Lyme, Connecticut.

== Impressionist ==
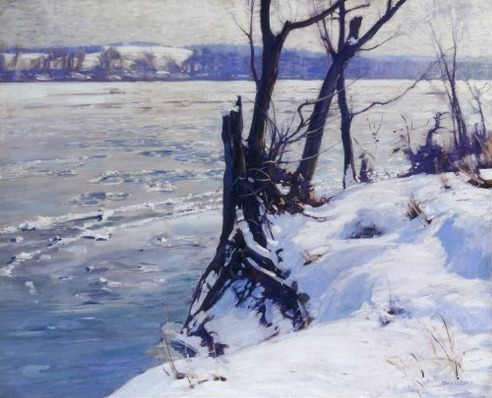
A Winter Morning - Bucks County, 1913

In 1903 Rosen married Mildred Holden. They moved to the vicinity of New Hope, Pennsylvania, which became their home for seventeen years. Rosen became known for his large snow scenes. His early work was often compared to Edward Willis Redfield, the leader of the group of impressionist artists at New Hope. He was also a friend of the artists Daniel Garber, William Langson Lathrop and John Fulton Folinsbee.

Rosen's landscapes were extremely varied. Sometimes they were spontaneous, thrown off quickly, and sometimes carefully worked. Some paintings were full of movement and others were serenely calm. Some are almost monochrome while some explode with color. In 1914 Rosen made the first of several visits to Vinalhaven Island on the coast of Maine. The rugged landscape was the subject of several paintings. His work became increasingly decorative.

In 1916 the National Academy awarded Rosen the Inness Gold Medal and the Altman Prize. He was given seven one-man shows and was elected to the National Academy. In 1916 Rosen and six other artists formed The New Hope Group to arrange for exhibitions of their work. The others in this group were Rae Sloan Bredin, Morgan Colt, Daniel Garber, William Langson Lathrop and Robert Spencer.

== Modernist ==
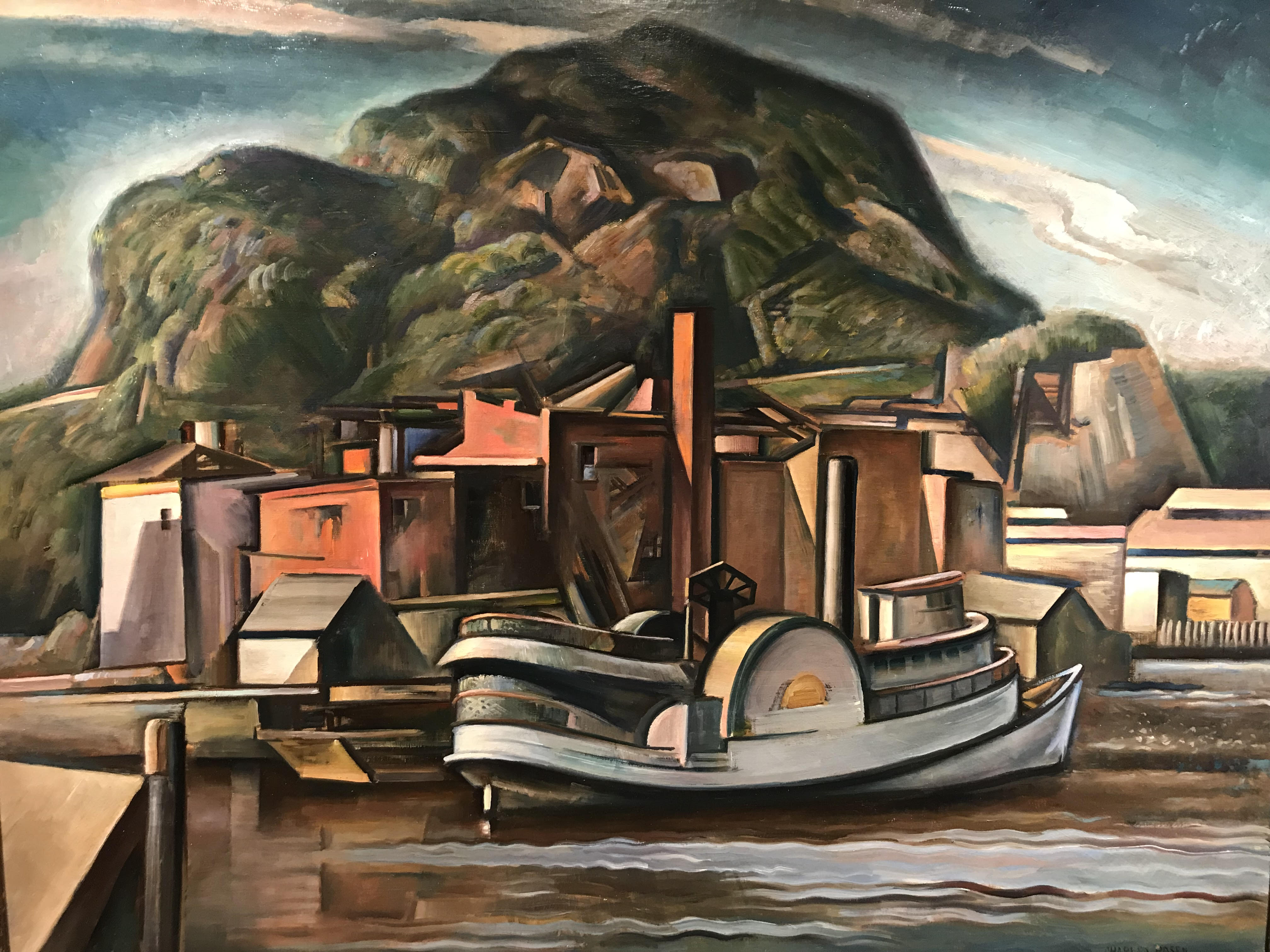
Sidewheel in the Rondout

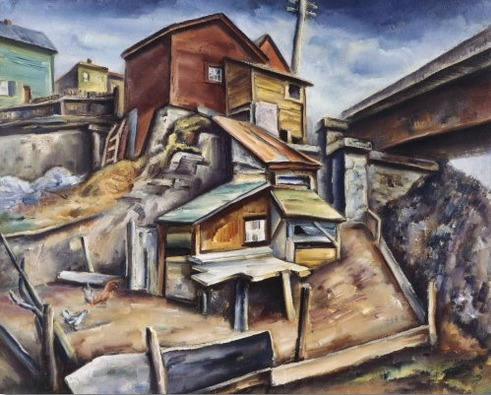
Cliff Dwellings, 1918

Rosen was starting to feel that Impressionism belonged to the past, and from 1916 began to experiment with other styles. He taught at the Art Students League of New York summer school in Woodstock, New York in 1918. He was an instructor and then director of the summer school until 1921. One of Rosen's students there was the Canadian André Charles Biéler. In 1920 Rosen moved permanently to Woodstock with his wife and their two daughters. He became a close friend of the painters George Bellows and Eugene Speicher. By 1920 Rosen had adopted a cubist-realist style (later identified as Precisionism) that characterized his work for the remainder of his life.

In 1922 Rosen, Henry Lee McFee and Andrew Dasburg founded the Woodstock School of Painting. Rosen taught at the Columbus Gallery of Fine Arts in Columbus, Ohio from 1924 to 1928. During the Great Depression the government commissioned Rosen to paint a series of murals in post offices. His murals in Beacon, New York and Poughkeepsie, New York included panoramas of the Hudson Valley and New York City, and historical scenes. The last was undertaken in 1939. He also executed work in Palm Beach, Florida, under this program. His modernist but realistic depictions of buildings, towers and smokestacks reflect the influence of Paul Cézanne.

In 1940 Rosen was appointed temporary director of the Witte Museum School of Art in San Antonio, Texas. Rosen suffered a heart attack in 1942. After this he focused on small pastels and drawings. He died on 21 June 1950 in Kingston, New York at the age of seventy two.

== Work ==
Rosen's impressionist winter landscapes of Pennsylvania and the coast of Maine, with forceful designs and bold, deeply layered brushwork, are thought by some to be his best work. His impressionist works were praised for their "virility, sincerity and power". Some of his simple but elegant compositions recall the style of Japanese prints. They were very well received at the time. Despite this, he turned to a cubist-realist style after moving to Woodstock. According to John Folinsbee, "Rosen was considering form in relation to warm and cool colors, lost and found edges, all of which contributed to intensify the illusion of space on flat canvas. Abstraction had gained for him a new importance." some critics consider his scenes of the towns of Rondout and Saugerties on the Hudson River to be his best work. However, another critic says that Rosen's bleak views of shabby buildings were hard to distinguish from the work of Bellows and Speicher.

The James A. Michener Art Museum in New Hope has a collection of Rosen's paintings. Brian H. Peterson, Senior Curator of this museum, wrote a book on the artist entitled Form Radiating Life: the Paintings of Charles Rosen (2006). The book was issued to coincide with an exhibition with the same title of more than fifty works organized by the James A. Michener Art Museum and shown at the Samuel Dorsky Museum of Art at the State University of New York at New Paltz. His work is held in public and private collections in New Mexico, Connecticut, Ohio, New York, Pennsylvania, Missouri and Washington, D.C.

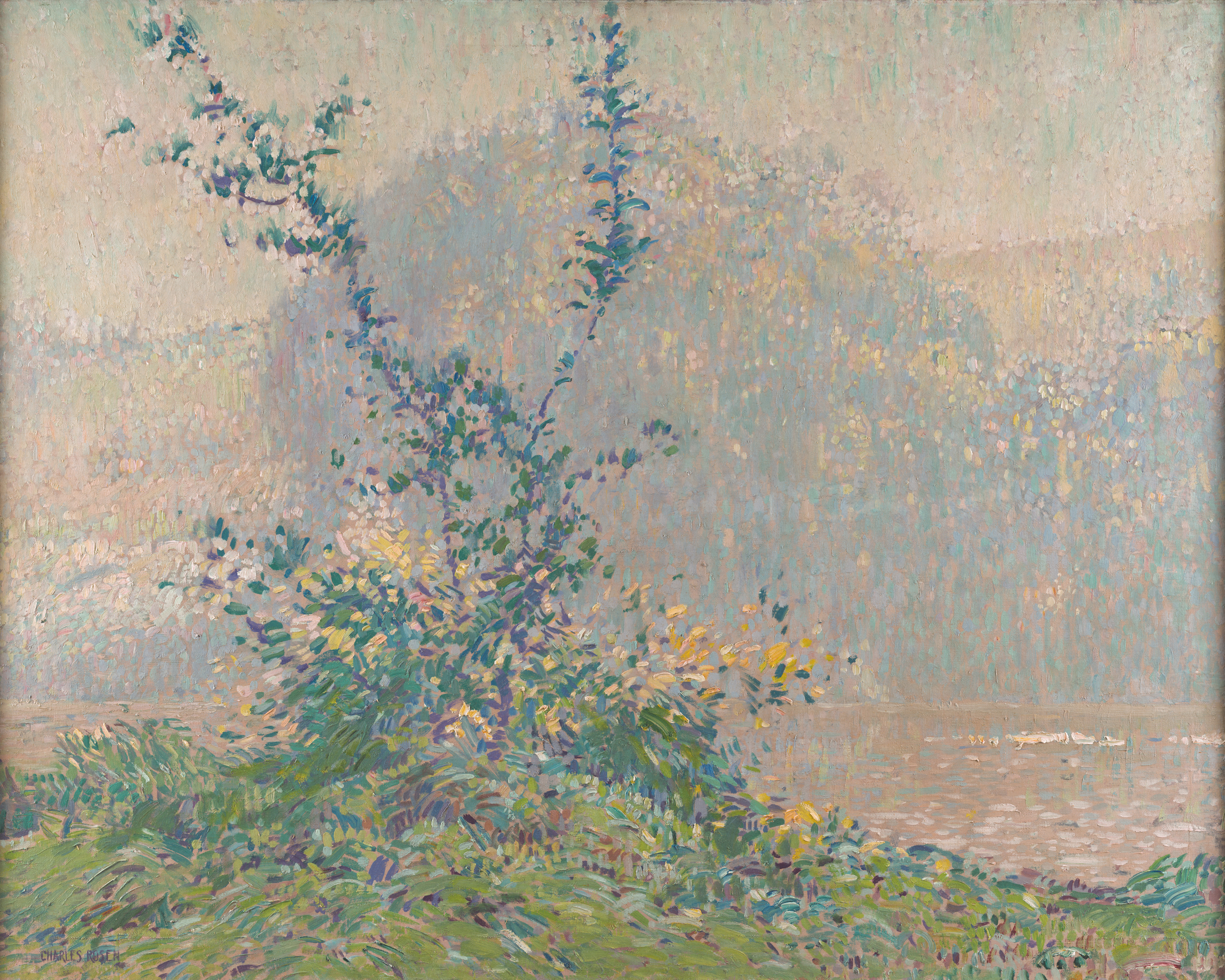
Morning, 1909

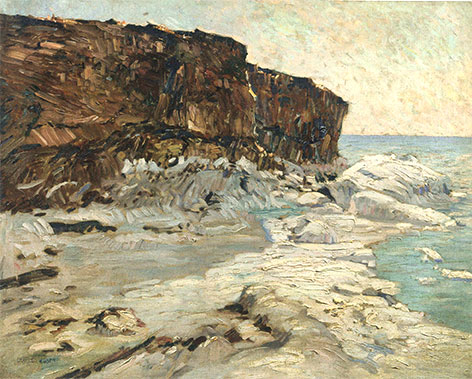
Bluff Point, Vinalhaven, 1914

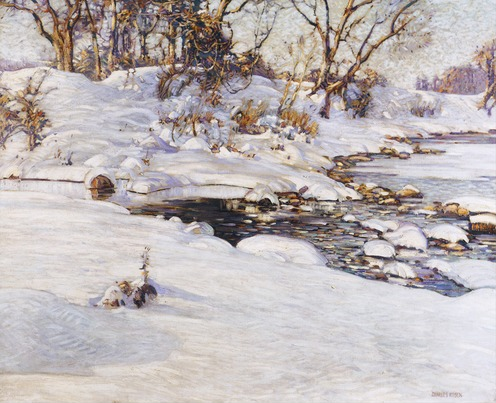
Winter Sunlight, 1916

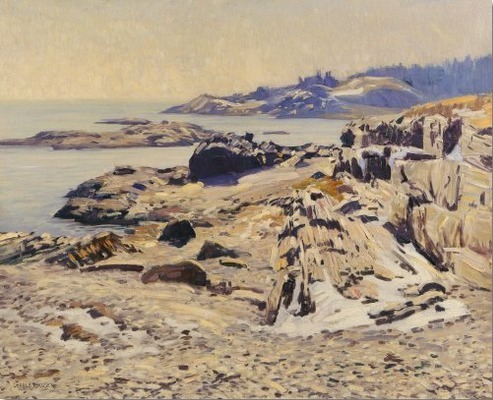
A Rocky Shore, 1917

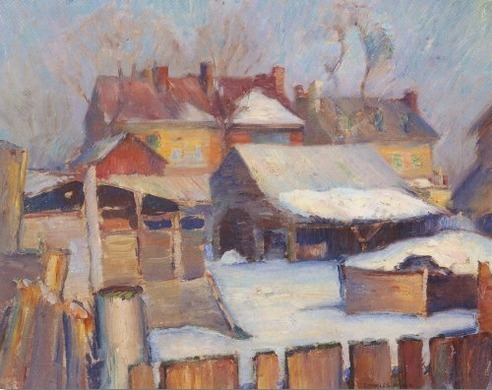
Rooftops, 1920
