= Margaret Fulton Spencer =

American architect and painter (1882–1966)

- Born: Margaret Alexina Harrison Fulton; September 26, 1882; Philadelphia, Pennsylvania, U.S.
- Died: January 1, 1966 (aged 83); Philadelphia, Pennsylvania, U.S.
- Other names: Margaret Fulton, Margaret Spencer
- Education: Bryn Mawr College; Massachusetts Institute of Technology
- Occupation: Architect
- Spouse: Robert Spencer
- Practice: Frank Miles Day
- Projects: Rancho Las Lomas

Margaret Fulton Spencer (1882–1966) was a painter and early American woman architect who designed and built the architecturally unique dude ranch Las Lomas Estates outside of Tucson, Arizona. She was the second woman to become a member of the American Institute of Architects.

== Early life ==
Fulton was born September 26, 1882, to Robert and Margaret Alexina (Harrison) Fulton, a wealthy couple in Philadelphia, Pennsylvania. She was a niece of the painters T. Alexander Harrison and L. Birge Harrison. The Fulton family eventually moved to Santa Barbara, California.

Fulton enrolled at Bryn Mawr College in 1901 but left after two years. She then spent 1904 studying painting at the New York School of Applied Design, and the summers of 1904 and 1905 at the Art Students League. She studied painting with her uncle Birge in Woodstock, New York, between 1904 and 1907. In around 1908, she began to study architecture at the Massachusetts Institute of Technology, where she was the only woman in her class. She graduated from MIT with a degree in architecture in 1911, making her part of the second generation of early American women architects. By 1912 she had found work with Philadelphia architect Frank Miles Day.

After college, Margaret continued her painting studies with the landscape painter William Langson Lathrop, who had founded an art colony near New Hope, Pennsylvania. In 1913 she met another of Lathrop's students, the impoverished Pennsylvania impressionist painter Robert Spencer, who quickly began courting her. Margaret was already engaged to someone else, but the Lathrops—with whom she was living at the time, and who favored Robert—intercepted an important letter from her fiancé, leading Margaret to believe she had been jilted. In something of a pique, she got engaged to Robert, and in 1914 they got married. The couple settled in New Hope, where they built a house using Margaret's inheritance and had two daughters, Margaret (known as Tink) and Ann Spencer (artist), who would later become a painter herself. The missing letter was unearthed and delivered to Margaret years later, and according to her daughters, she remained angry about the deception that had been practiced on her right up to her death.

== Career ==
Early in her career, Spencer developed a specialty in restoring old farmhouses built of fieldstone and also worked as an interior designer. She gained architect's licenses in Pennsylvania and New Jersey (and later in Arizona). In 1929, she became the second woman member of the American Institute of Architects (AIA).

However, Robert did not support her architectural career, so despite her ambitions she eventually switched fully into painting while he lived, focusing on landscapes and floral still lifes in an impressionist style. Margaret and Robert's relationship was volatile and eventually became so unhappy that the couple considered divorce. Margaret built her own separate studio on their New Hope property, complete with a kitchen and bedroom, and would retreat there to paint alone for days at a time. She later considered her years in New Hope the worst part of her life.

Robert Spencer, who suffered from depression, killed himself in 1931, and Margaret was unfairly blamed for it by people in their social circle. She moved to Paris with her daughters and returned to architecture, joining an American architectural firm. She also exhibited her paintings at the Paris Salon.

In 1938 she moved to Arizona, where she bought 190 acres of desert land near Tucson. On this land, she designed and built a rambling group of 16 buildings of locally quarried stone. Most were one-story cottages designed to blend with the landscape, but there were a few two-story towers as well, the entire group showing the influence of Tunisian vernacular architecture that she had particularly admired during earlier travels in Africa. There is even a legend that she sketched out the initial floor plans in the dirt with a stick. In any case, Spencer's design program for the site stood in stark contrast to what was already becoming the dominant local aesthetic of tract houses and neatly organized subdivisions. The property was initially named Las Lomas Estates and later renamed Rancho Las Lomas.

Spencer ran Las Lomas as a dude ranch, and the cottages became a popular vacation spot during the 1940s and 1950s for well-to-do celebrities like Clark Gable and Carole Lombard (who honeymooned there) and Frank Lloyd Wright. According to Spencer, Wright approved of the informal, rugged, low buildings when he visited the ranch. Spencer expanded the buildings over the years, and they now number 30 altogether. In the late 1950s, Spencer was still making plans to expand the property and add 50 new houses. She wrote an unpublished account of her years at Las Lomas, giving it the characteristically acerbic title "Dudes and Dopes."

In recent years, the site has become rental housing populated largely by artists and writers. As of 2015, it was under consideration for refurbishment as a National Register of Historic Places site.

During her Arizona years, Spencer helped to establish a Tucson chapter of the AIA.

Spencer died January 1, 1966, in Philadelphia.

== Buildings ==
- Chimney Hill Bed and Breakfast, 207 Goat Hill Road., Lamberville, NJ
- Law Office of Hunt & Faherty, 40 Delaware Avenue, Lambertville, NJ
- Isaac Clotheir House, alterations and additions, Gwynedd Valley, Montgomery County, PA.
- Las Lomas Estates (Rancho Las Lomas), near Tucson, AZ
