= Robert Spencer (artist) =

American painter

Robert Carpenter Spencer
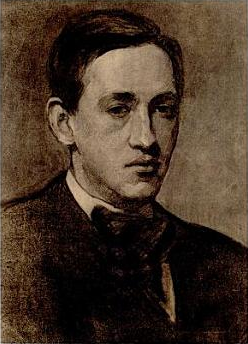
- Self portrait (1909)
- Born: 1 December 1879; Harvard, Nebraska, US
- Died: 11 July 1931 (aged 51); New Hope, Pennsylvania, US
- Occupation: Painter

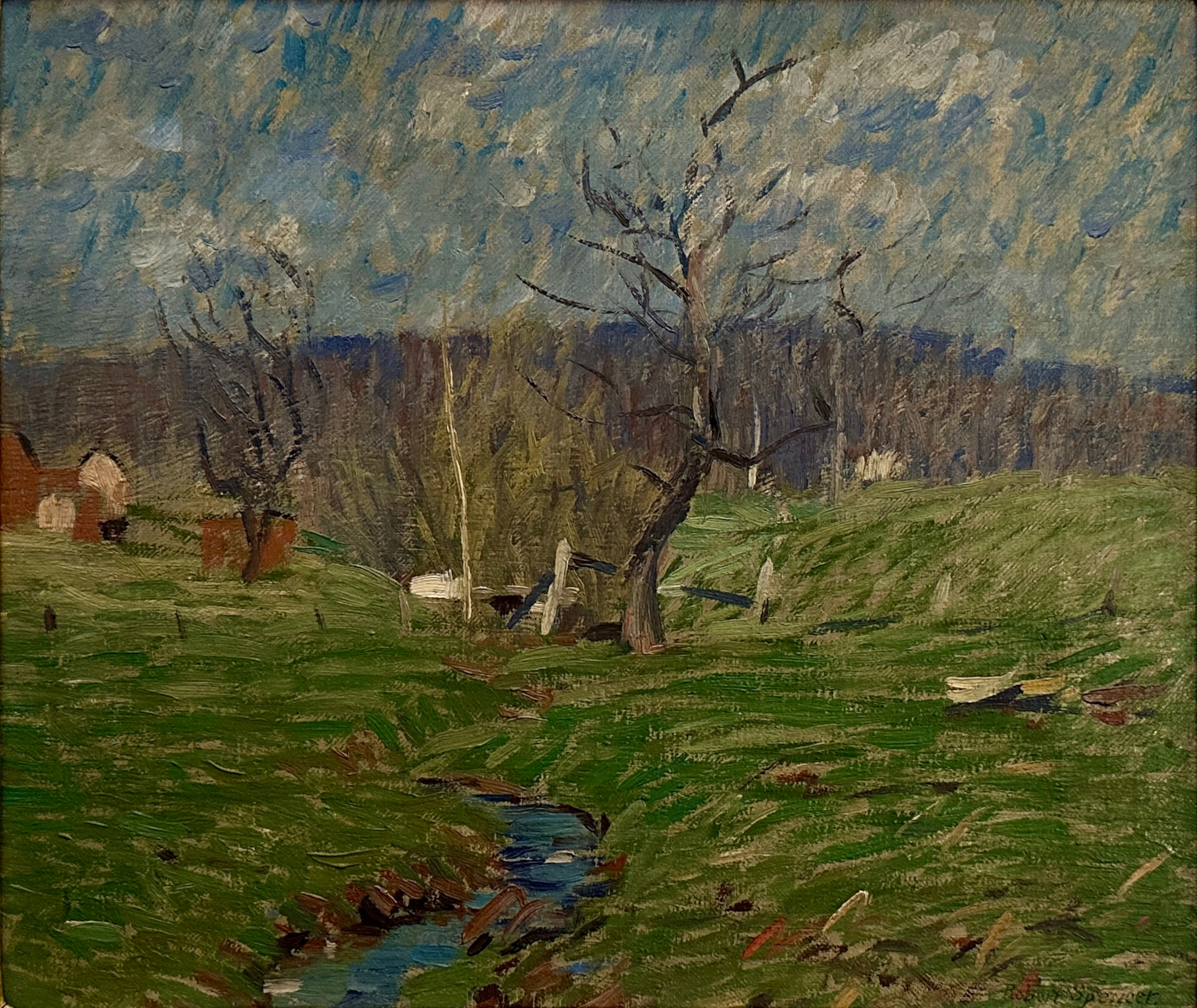
Oil on canvas painting named "Meadowland" by Robert Spencer in a Harer frame.

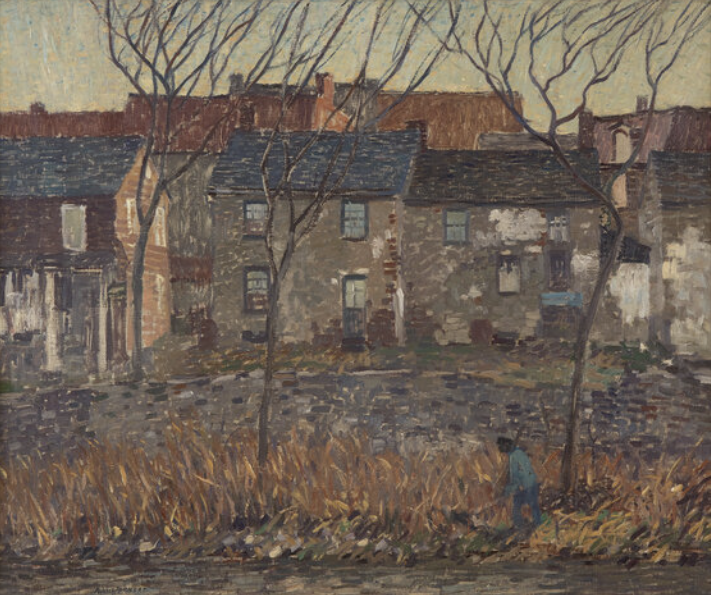
Oil on canvas, 25 x 30 inch, "Waterloo Row" by Robert Spencer

Robert Carpenter Spencer (1 December 1879 – 11 July 1931) was an American painter who received extensive recognition in his day. He was one of the Pennsylvania impressionists, but is better known for his paintings of the mills and working people of the Delaware River region than for landscapes. His work is held in numerous public collections.

== Early years ==
Robert Carpenter Spencer was born on 1 December 1879 in Harvard, Nebraska, son of Solomon Hogue Spencer, a Swedenborgian clergyman and a distant descendant of the English noble Spencer family. His mother was Frances Strickler Spencer, daughter of a buggy manufacturer. His father left the church to teach for a few years while his two children were infants. He returned to the ministry in 1884. He co-founded, published and edited The New Christianity, a Swedenborgian journal. The family moved often. They lived in Illinois, Missouri, Pennsylvania, New York, Virginia and then Yonkers, New York, where Robert Spencer graduated from high school in 1899.

Spencer had planned to study medicine, but instead in 1899 began to study art at the National Academy of Design in New York City. He met and befriended the painter Charles Rosen while at the academy. From 1903 to 1905 he studied under William Merritt Chase at his New York School of Art, and probably studied under Robert Henri. He spent about a year working for a civil engineering company as a draftsman and surveyor. His father died in 1906.

== Career ==
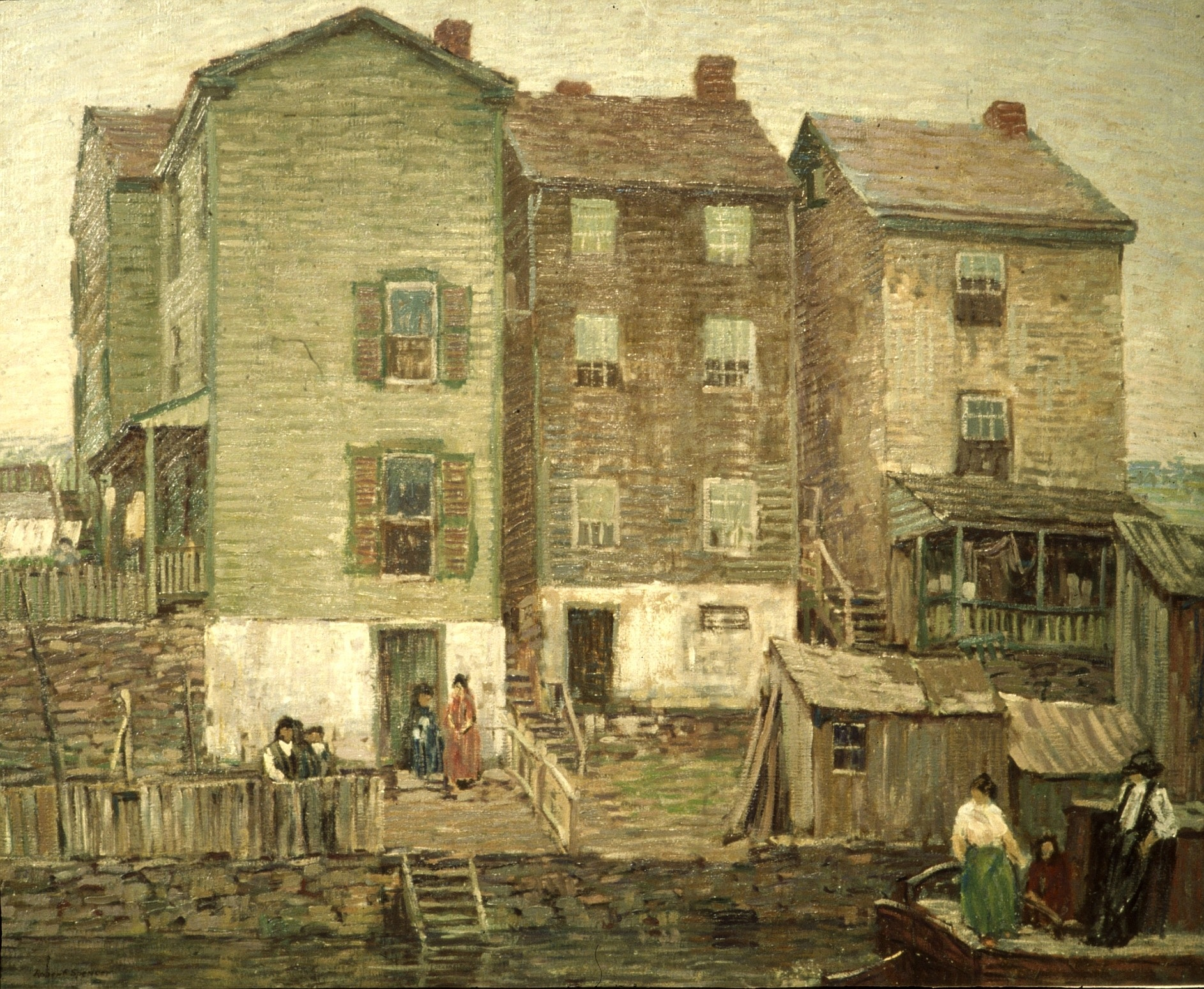
Three Houses (1911)

In 1906 Spencer moved to the Bucks County area, where Charles Rosen had settled three years earlier. For the next few years he lived in various small towns on the Delaware River. These included Frenchtown, New Jersey and Point Pleasant, Pennsylvania. During this period he studied with Daniel Garber, who strongly influenced his style. For a few years Spencer and an artist friend Charles Frederic Ramsey lived in poverty in an extremely dilapidated old house called the Huffnagle Mansion. (Note: The Huffnagle Mansion was built in 1707 for Richard Heath, owner of the Heath Grist Mill. In 1802 it was purchased by William Maris, owner of the Maris Silk Mill. Some of Spencer's most important works were of these two mills.) They paid a nominal rent of $2 per month. The house had peeling plaster and little in the way of heating. The lavatory was an outhouse. Spencer was very productive during this period, and won awards at the National Academy of Art and Design and the Art Club of Philadelphia.

Spencer studied with the established landscape painter William Lathrop. In 1913 he met Margaret Alexina Harrison Fulton (born 1882), a fellow student of Lathrop who was an architect as well as a painter. Margaret was from a wealthy Philadelphia family. She was the niece of the painters Alexander and Birge Harrison. They married in 1914. They moved first into an apartment and then into a new house. Spencer became an Associate of the National Academy of Design in 1914. In 1916 Spencer, Rae Sloan Bredin, Charles Rosen, Morgan Colt, Daniel Garber and William Langson Lathrop formed The New Hope Group to arrange for exhibitions of their work.

In the 1920s Spencer began painting landscapes of the Delaware River valley. He experienced a series of nervous breakdowns in the years that followed. His marriage became unhappy. In the summer of 1925 he visited Spain, France and Italy. He returned to Europe on 1927 and spent several months in Paris. He started painting imaginary scenes with European settings. On July 11, 1931, Spencer committed suicide with a handgun in his studio. He left two daughters. including artist Ann Spencer (artist)

== Work ==
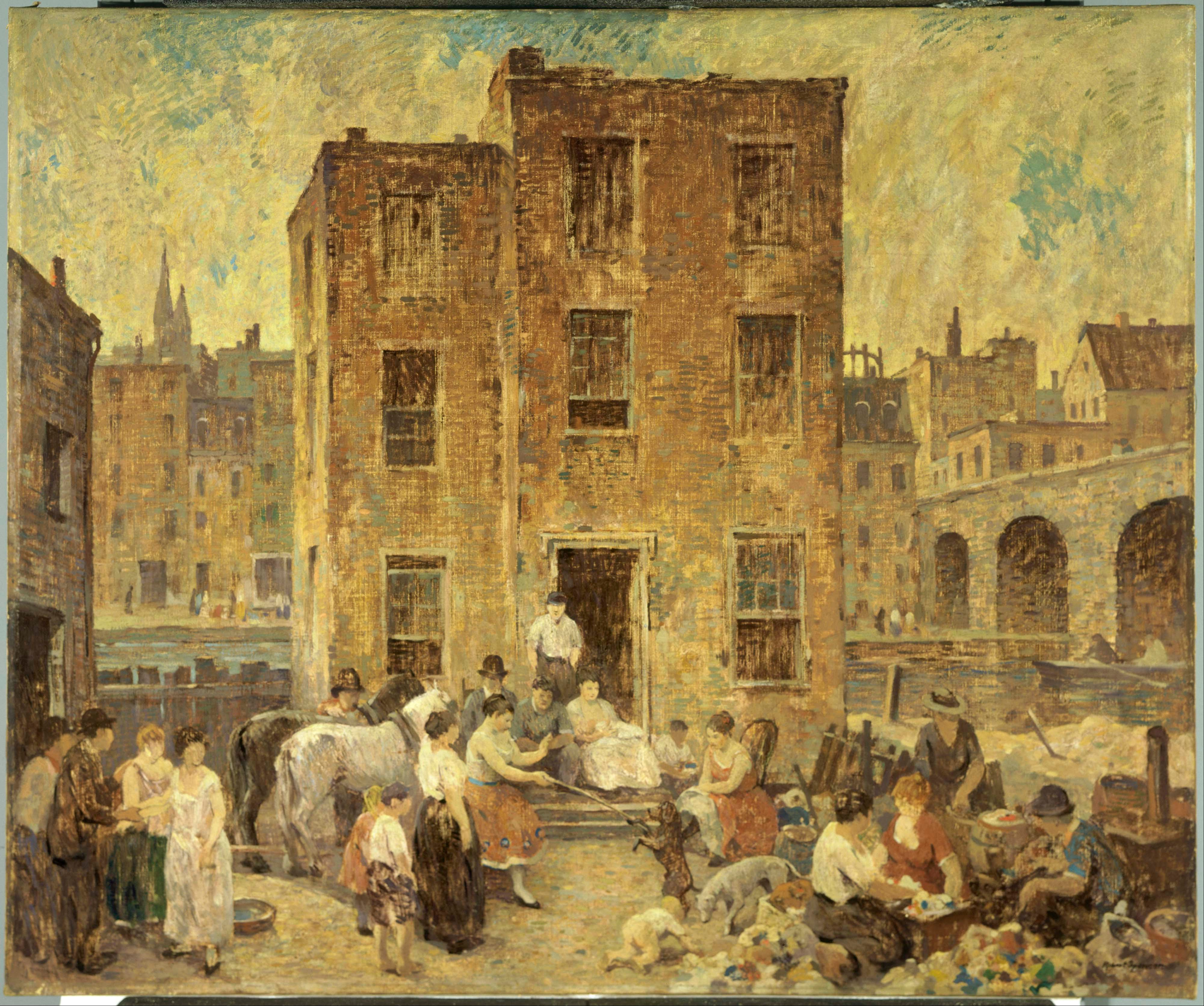
Mountebanks and Thieves (1923)

Spencer is known for his paintings of figures against a backdrop of factories and apartment houses, in an impressionist style with short, tight brushstrokes. The paintings he made in 1909–10 of the Pennsylvania mills and the women mill workers are considered his best. He said, "A landscape without a building or a figure is a very lonely picture to me." Well known works include The Silk Mill (1912), Grey Mills (1913), The Closing Hour (1913) and Repairing the Bridge (1913). The Metropolitan Museum of Art bought Repairing the Bridge in 1914. His painting On the Canal, New Hope was acquired in 1916 by the Detroit Museum of Art. It depicts the back of run-down houses on the canal, with the lower portions whitewashed and bathed in light, with women doing housework.

A contemporary critic wrote, "Interpreted thro' the temperament of Robert Spencer a squalid motive which most of us would pass daily and regard as hopelessly commonplace is presented in a way to stir our emotions and without losing anything of its truth..." Pierre Bonnard said in 1926 "Mr. Spencer . . . is in the full vigor of his talent, which is great. His art does not resemble European art, a rare fact in America." According to the art collector Duncan Phillips he was"a rebel always against the standardized and stereotyped in art... [there was] no other painter, not John Sloan, or Edward Hopper, more pungently American in expression."

Spencer exhibited widely in the United States and abroad. Institutions that hold his work include the Art Institute of Chicago, the Metropolitan Museum of Art, the James A. Michener Art Museum, the Brooklyn Museum, the Smithsonian Institution, the Berkshire Museum, the Corcoran Gallery of Art, the Philadelphia Museum of Art, the National Academy of Design, The Reading Public Museum, the Detroit Institute of Fine Arts, the National Arts Club, the Delaware Art Museum, the Widener University Art Museum and The Phillips Collection in Washington D.C.

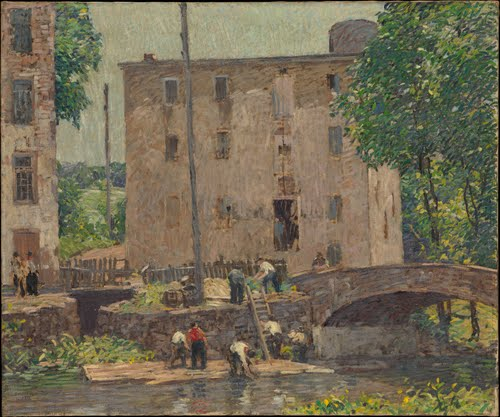
Repairing the bridge (1913)

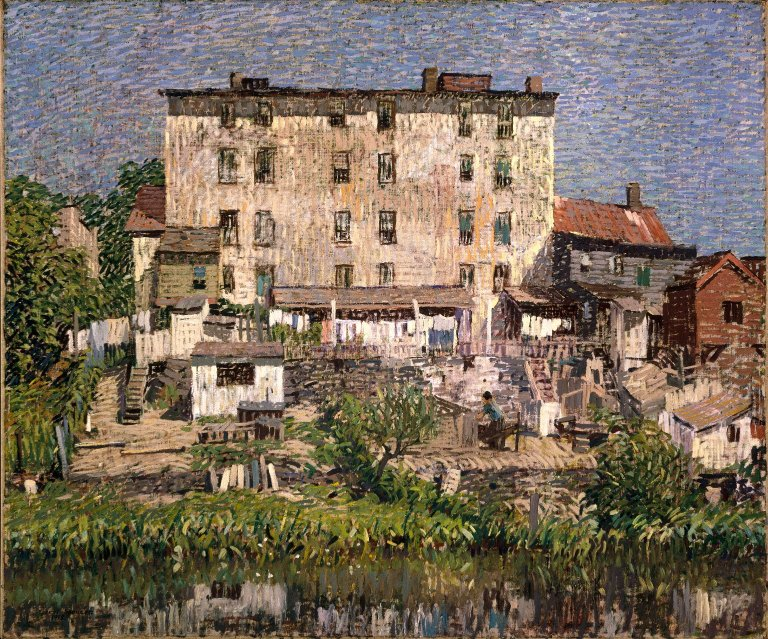
The White Tenement (c. 1913) Brooklyn Museum

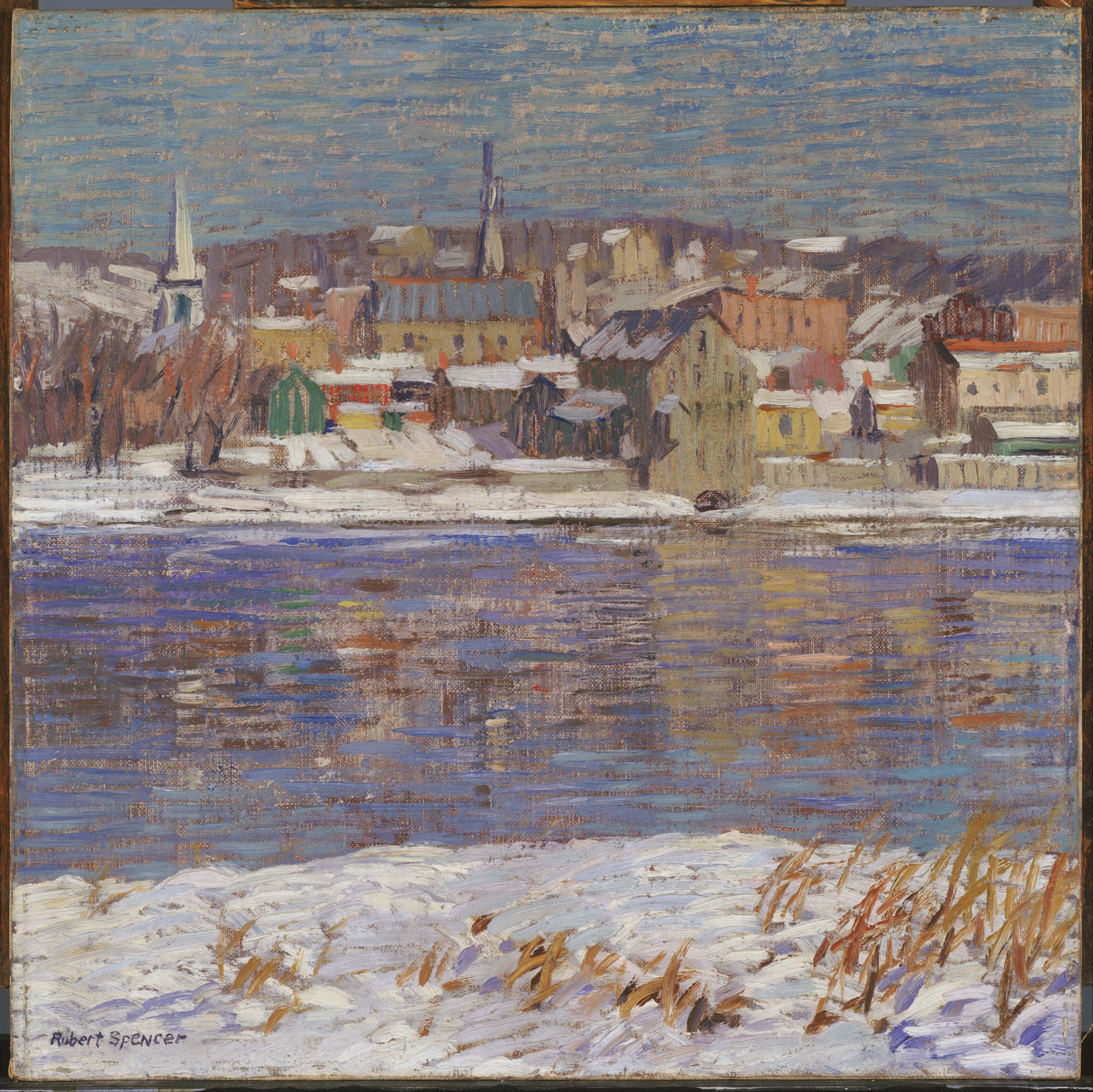
Across the Delaware (c. 1916)

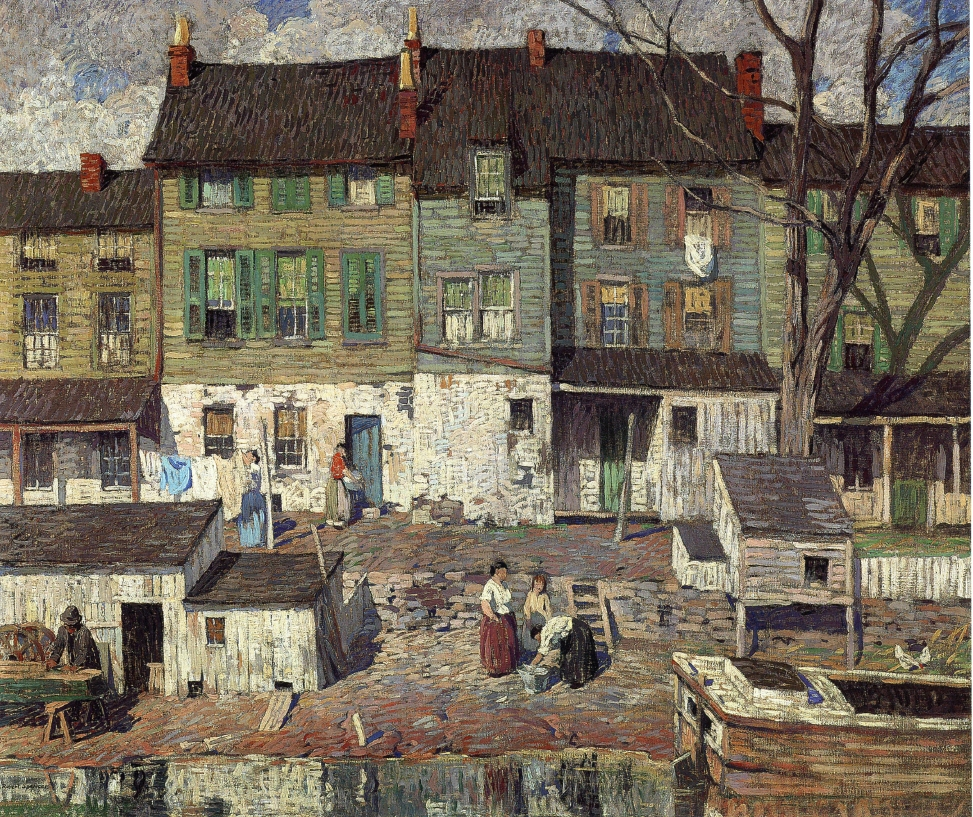
On the Canal, New Hope (1916)

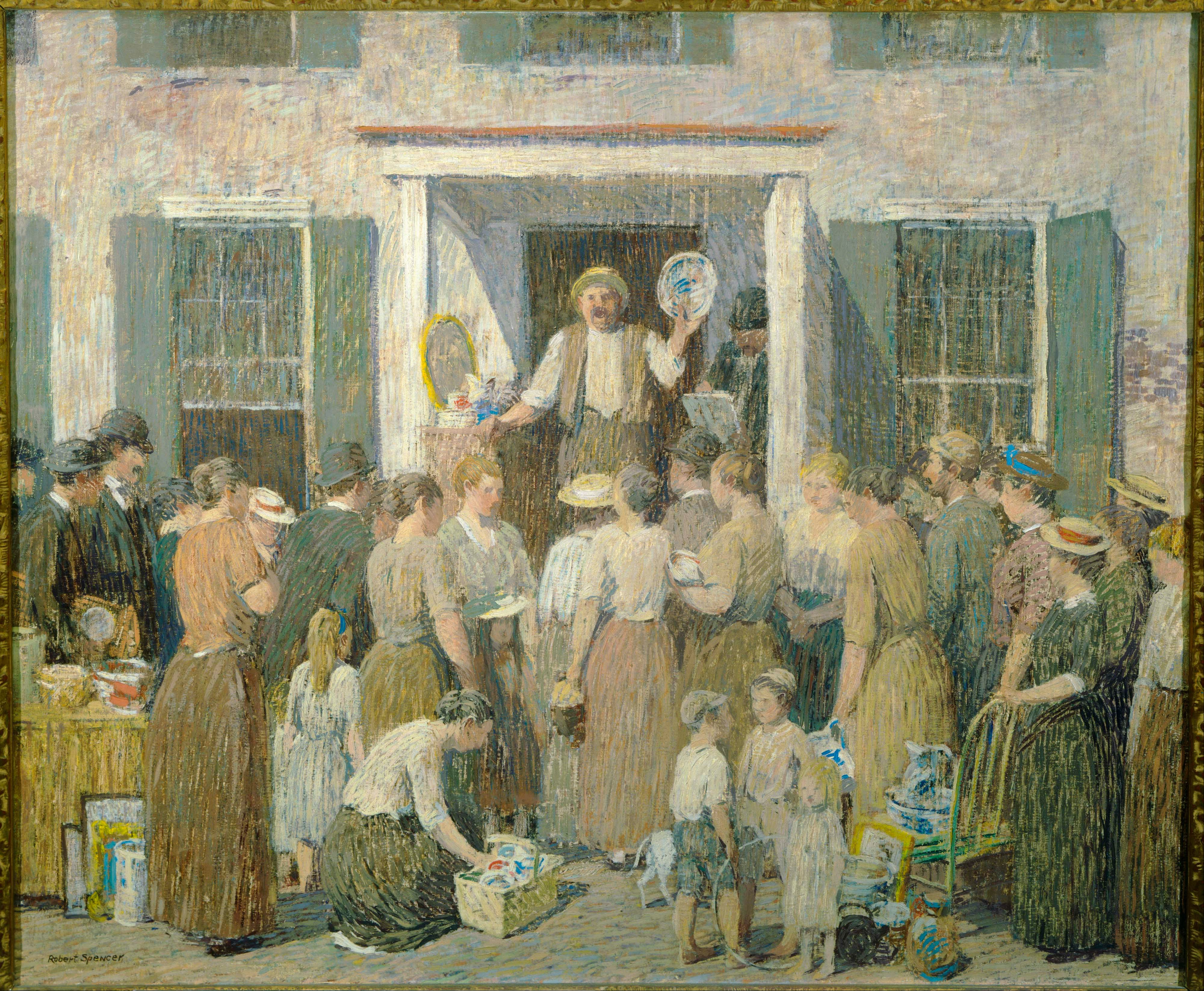
The Auction (c. 1918)

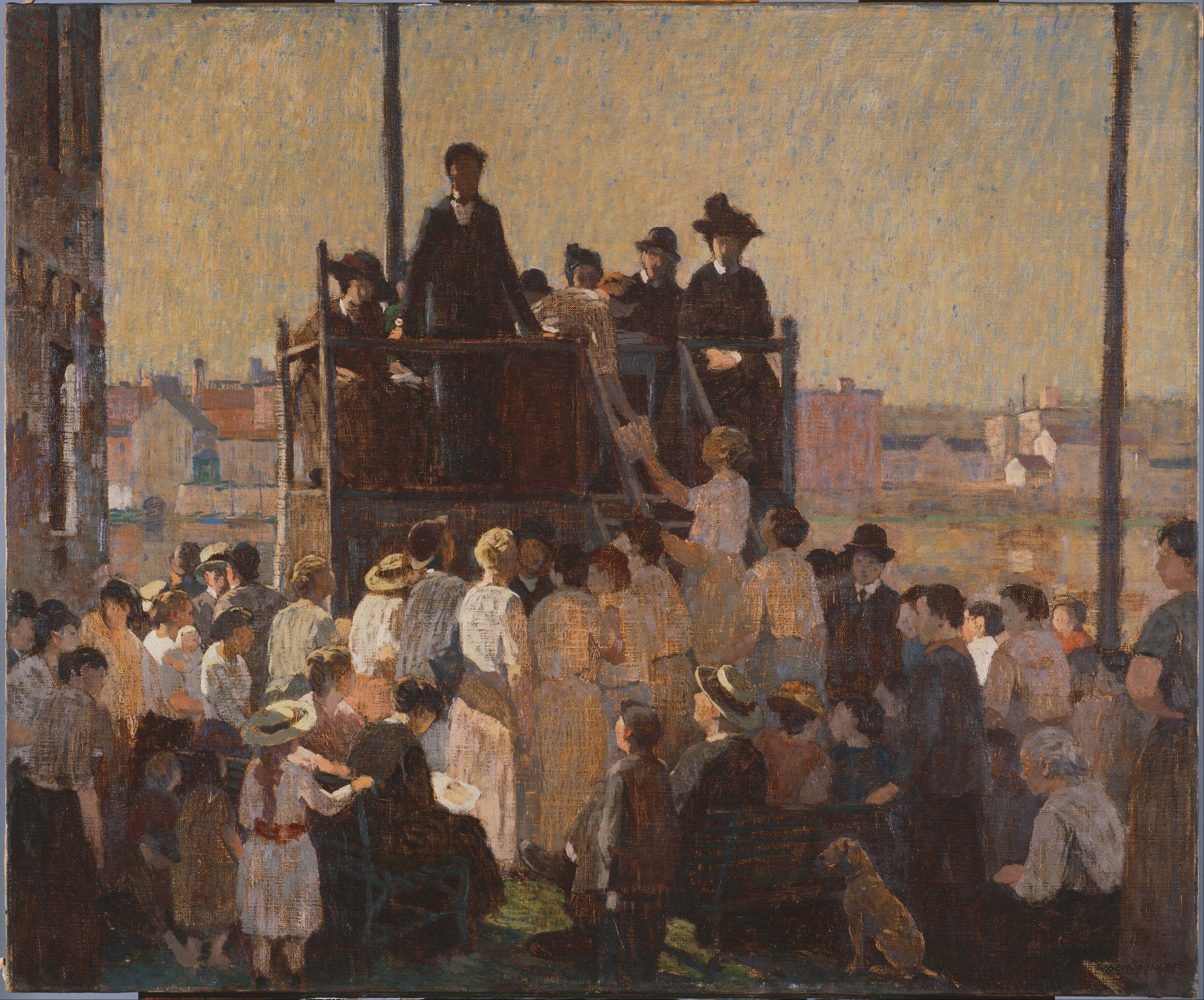
The Evangelist (c. 1918-19)

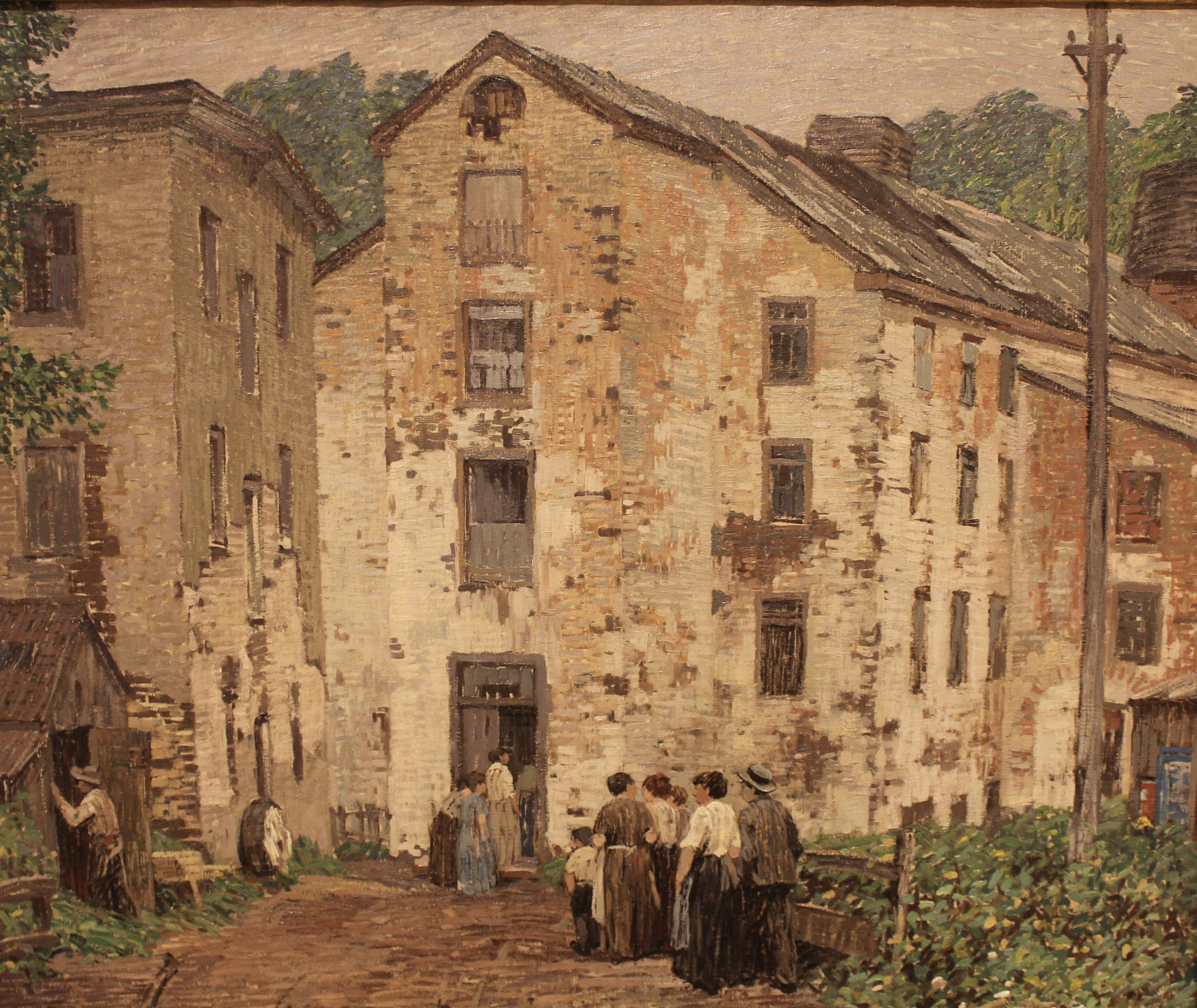
Grey Mills (1915)
