= Reagantown, Pennsylvania =

Unincorporated community in Pennsylvania, US

Reagantown
- Unincorporated community
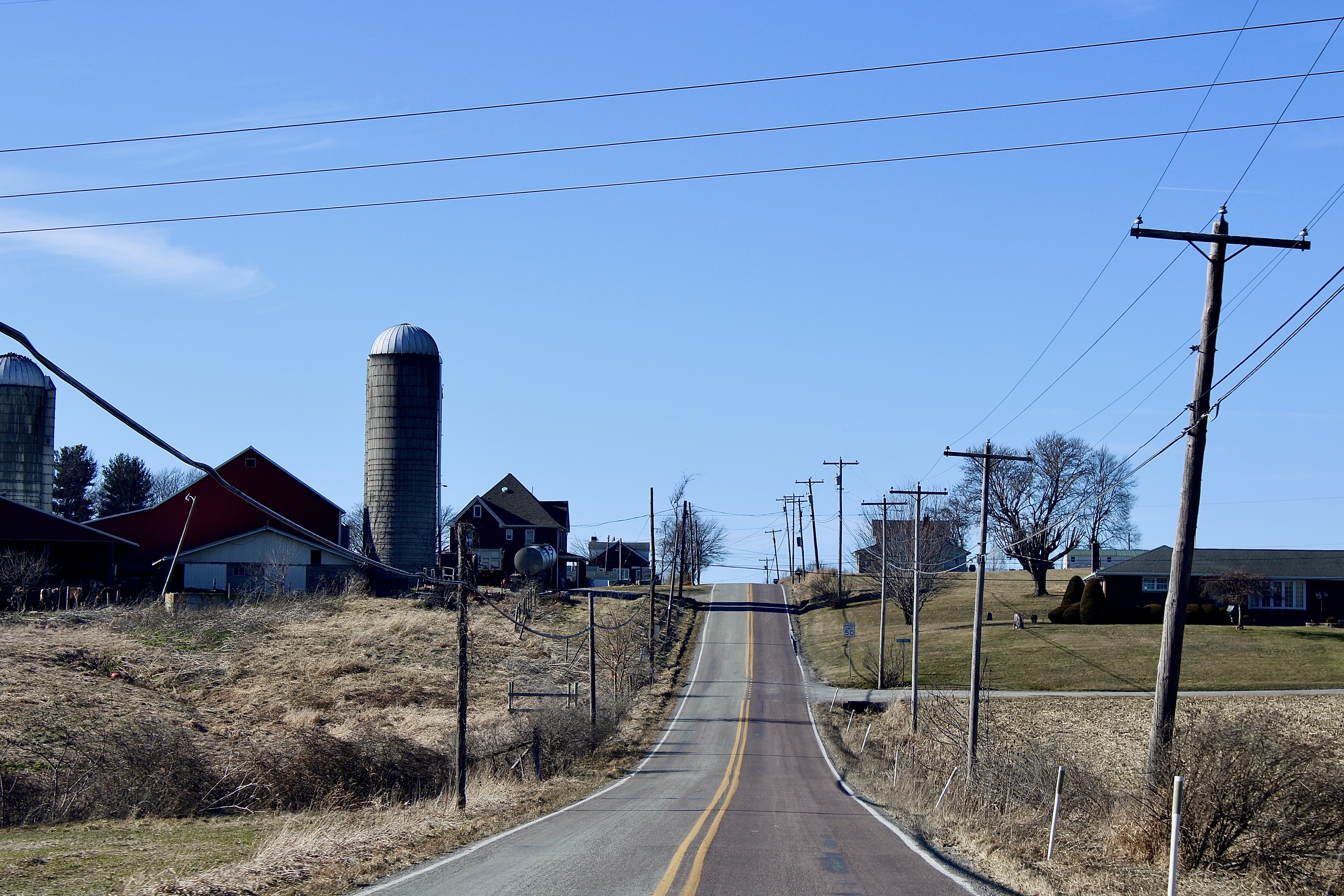
- Route 981 through Reagantown

- Location within the state of Pennsylvania Reagantown (the United States)
- Coordinates: 40°8′20″N 79°38′47″W
- Country: United States
- State: Pennsylvania
- County: Westmoreland
- Time zone: UTC-5 (Eastern (EST))
  - Summer (DST): UTC-4 (EDT)

Reagantown is a hamlet in the Township of East Huntingdon in Westmoreland County, Pennsylvania, United States. It lies along Pennsylvania Route 981, between Smithton and Scottdale. Hixsons, Houghs, Suters, Smiths, Snyders, Lowes, McCurdys, Henkstellers, Reagans and Fosters were the most prominent settlers in the area.

== History ==
The area surrounding present-day Reagantown was settled during the early development of western Westmoreland County. Among the early families in the vicinity were the Suters, Smiths, Snyders, Lowes, McCurdys, Henkstellers, Reagans, and Fosters. The community took its name from the Reagan family, who were the earliest settlers of the area.

Wesley Chapel on Wesley Chapel Road

By the middle of the 19th century, Reagantown had developed into a small rural community serving the surrounding farms. A Presbyterian congregation established the ‘’‘Harmony Presbyterian Church’’’ in Reagantown in 1849. In 1879, the congregation was absorbed into the Presbyterian Church in nearby Scottdale.

Reagantown also developed a small commercial district during the 19th century. John S. Parker, who had previously operated a store in West Newton, established a second store at Reagantown. Parker was a veteran of the War of 1812 and a member of the Presbyterian Church. He died at Reagantown in 1857. Following his death, his wife, Jane Graham Parker, assumed responsibility for the store and continued operating it with assistance from their sons.

The Parker family continued to be associated with commerce in Reagantown. George C. Parker and his brother Richard G. Parker established a general-merchandise store in the community about 1873. The business remained in operation until 1880, after which George C. Parker moved to Scottdale and entered into business there with his brother John S. Parker.

Agriculture was the principal occupation in the countryside surrounding Reagantown. The community was also affected by the development of the region’s mineral resources during the 19th century. Coal mining and natural-gas exploration became important industries in portions of East Huntingdon Township. The David Hixson farm south of Reagantown contained the Hixson Well, which was associated with the development of natural gas in the area.

By 1910, it was served by the Scottdale post office and listed in the ‘‘Rand McNally Bankers Directory’’ as “Reagantown (Scottdale P.O.)”.

The settlement developed along the principal road between Scottdale and Smithton, later incorporated into the Pennsylvania state highway system as Pennsylvania Route 981. Reagantown continues to be associated with the Scottdale area for postal and commercial purposes, while its governmental jurisdiction remains East Huntingdon Township. Contemporary mapping lists it among the named communities within the township.

== Economy ==
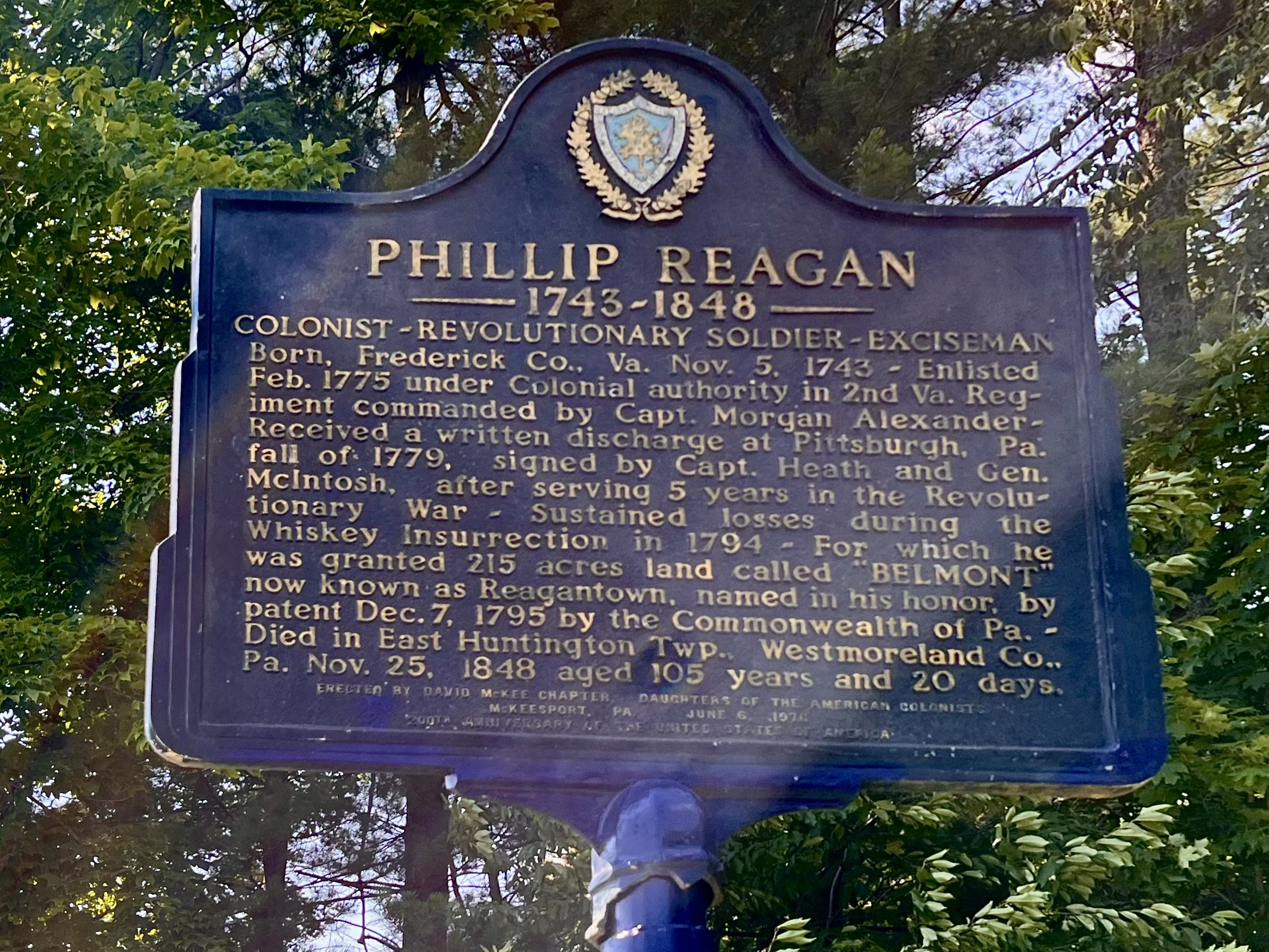
Sign at the entrance to Reagantown

Traditionally, Reagantown has been a farming and coal mining community. David Hixson farm lies to the south of Reagantown and contained the Hixson Well which tapped shale and coal in the 19th century under the Fayette Natural Gas Company.

== Landmarks and education ==
A Presbyterian church was built in 1849, and there is also a Wesleyan chapel, approximately two miles to the south. There is a lane leading south from the hamlet named after this chapel, which leads to it. The area of Reagantown has several businesses in both South and East Huntingdon.

Residents in Reagantown attend either the Southmoreland School District (Wesley Chapel Road through Scottdale-Smithton Road), or the Yough School District (Rolling Hills Road through State Hill Road). The area is considered parts of Scottdale, Smithton, East Huntingdon and Ruffs Dale.

== Notable person ==
- Charles Rosen (1878–1950), painter
