= Christine Sloan Bredin =

American painter, illustrator, and teacher

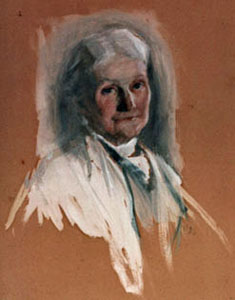
- Catherine Bredin painted by Rae Sloan Bredin
- Born: Christine Sloan; 1860; Butler, Pennsylvania
- Died: 1934 (aged 73–74)
- Known for: Painting, Illustration, Educator
- Spouse: Stephen C. Bredin

Christine Sloan Bredin (1860–1934) was an American painter, illustrator, and teacher.

== Biography ==
Bredin née Sloan was born in 1860 in Butler, Pennsylvania. She attended the Cincinnati Academy of Art and the Académie Colarossi. She also studied with Carl von Marr in Munich, Germany. Her son was the Pennsylvania Impressionist, Rae Sloan Bredin.

Bredin exhibited her work at the Woman's Building at the 1893 World's Columbian Exposition in Chicago, Illinois. She also exhibited at the Cotton States and International Exposition in 1895 in Atlanta, Georgia. At that time she shared a studio with fellow artist Annie G. Sykes.

Bredin taught at Ohio University in Athens, Ohio. She was a member of The Plastic Club in Philadelphia, Pennsylvania and a charter member of the Cincinnati Women's Art Club.

She died in 1934.
