= Rae Sloan Bredin =

American painter

- Born: 9 September 1880; Butler, Pennsylvania, US
- Died: 16 July 1933 (aged 52); Philadelphia, US
- Occupation: Painter

Rae Sloan Bredin (9 September 1880 – 16 July 1933) was an American painter. He was a member of the New Hope, Pennsylvania school of impressionists. He is known for his peaceful spring and summer landscapes with relaxed groups of women and children.

== Life ==
Rae Sloan Bredin was born on 9 September 1880 in Butler, Pennsylvania, son of Stephen Lowrie Collins Bredin and Catherine Sloan. His father was a doctor. He received his primary education in Franklin, Pennsylvania. He attended the Pratt Institute in Brooklyn, graduating in 1899. He studied at the New York School of Art from 1900 to 1903 under James Carroll Beckwith, William Merritt Chase and Frank DuMond. He and Edmund Greacen used Chase's former studio to give art classes. Bredin went on to the Pennsylvania Academy of Fine Arts in Philadelphia, where he studied under Thomas Anshutz and Robert Henri. He first appeared in an Academy exhibition in 1907, and was represented there regularly for the rest of his life.

In 1914 Bredin won the Julius Hallgarten Prize at the annual exhibition of the National Academy of Design. That year he married Alice Price, a sister of the painter Mary Elizabeth Price and of the influential critic and art dealer Frederick Newlin Price. They were married on 14 May 1914 on the lawn of the Price family farm in Solebury, Pennsylvania. They went to France and Italy for their honeymoon, then settled in New Hope, Pennsylvania. They had two daughters and one son.

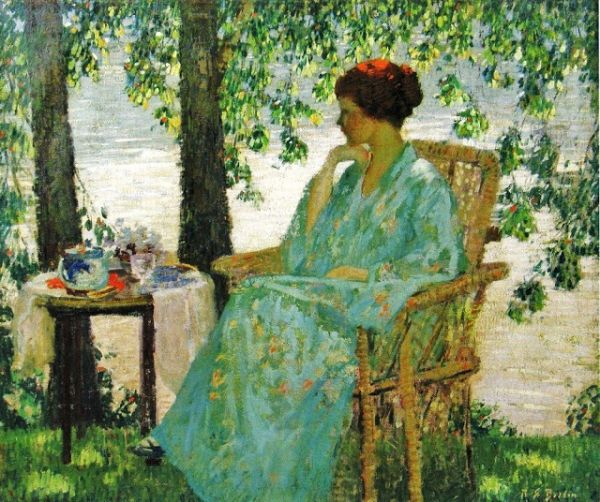
Reverie (1915)

Author James A. Michener first came into contact with the Bredin family, Alice's sister Mary Elizabeth Price, and their brother Frederick Newlin Price, when he was teaching one of their younger family members, Celia Price, in Junior High School in Bucks County. This young girl apparently gave Michener his first introduction to art, and he later came to know the work of the other New Hope artists as well. Michener treats these artists very sensitively in a Foreword to the first book on the Pennsylvania Impressionists.

In 1916 Bredin, Charles Rosen, Morgan Colt, Daniel Garber, William Langson Lathrop and Robert Spencer formed The New Hope Group to arrange for exhibitions of their work. In 1916–17 the New Hope Group exhibition traveled to at least nine locations, including the Cincinnati Art Museum, the Detroit Museum of Art and the Corcoran Gallery in Washington. Along with Edward Redfield – who was very noticeably absent – these artists form the early core of the Pennsylvania Impressionists. The significance of this group lies in the fact that they exhibited their work together and were representative of one school of landscape painting. In 1917 Bredin and Edmund Greacen formed the New York School of Fine Arts in Chase's former studio on 25th Street, but both abandoned that project to go to France the next year to serve in the French "Foyer Du Soldat," a joint service program of the French Army and the American YMCA. Bredin headed a rest hospital in the rear of the lines near Troyes, and in 1919 was a regional director.

Bredin taught at the Shinnecock Hills Summer School of Art at Shinnecock Hills, New York; the University of Virginia, Charlottesville; and the Philadelphia School of Design for Women. Several of his pupils at the School of Design for Women formed "The Philadelphia Ten" for the purpose of exhibiting their work, 1917–45. He died after a cancer operation on 17 July 1933 at the Joseph Price Memorial Hospital in Philadelphia. He was aged fifty two. He was a professor at the School of Design for Women at the time of his death.

== Work ==
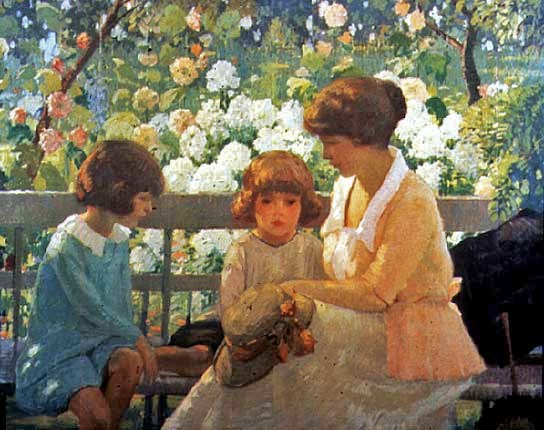
The Garden Bench (1920)

Bredin's wife and children were the principal subject for his paintings. The best known and well-loved of these is his "The Garden Bench," circa 1920 (private collection) which depicts his young daughters Jean and Barbara, seated with their mother, Alice, surrounded by flowers. It is one of Bredin's largest works, measuring 43 by 53 inches (1,100 by 1,300 mm), and was the subject of a best selling art poster over the past two decades. Bredin's signature paintings depict lawn fetes on the grounds of his home "Lawn Shadows," which was located on the Delaware Canal, just north of the town of New Hope. These are typically afternoon scenes painted to the rear of the artist's property, with graceful trees and blossoming flowers, with the Delaware River serving as a backdrop. They always include beautiful young women in pastel colored gowns, and often include children and occasionally, even a well-groomed female servant.

Bredin belonged to the group of Impressionists in Pennsylvania whose work was called America's "first truly national expression" by Guy Pène du Bois. He was a refined and dignified person, and his character shows in his portraits and landscapes. His paintings often include women and children in relaxed groups, dressed in delicate colors and set in the peaceful landscape of the Delaware River Valley, or in interior settings. In 1928 he undertook a commission to paint murals of the four seasons and the Delaware Water Gap for the foyer of the New Jersey State Museum. These are now displayed in the New Jersey State House Annex. He exhibited at the Carnegie Institute, Pittsburgh; Art Institute of Chicago, Illinois; and the National Academy of Design, New York City.

== Sources ==
- Dearinger, David Bernard (2004). Paintings and Sculpture in the Collection of the National Academy of Design: 1826–1925. Hudson Hills. ISBN 978-1-55595-029-3.
- Folk, Thomas (1984). The Pennsylvania School of Landscape Painting: An Original American Impressionism. Allentown Art Museum.
- Folk, Thomas (1997). "Snell, Colt and Bredin". The Pennsylvania Impressionists, with a Foreword by James A. Michener. Doylestown and London: James Michener Museum and Associated University Presses. ISBN 9780838636992.
- Lowrey, Carol (2007). A Legacy of Art: Paintings and Sculptures by Artist Life Members of the National Arts Club. Hudson Hills. ISBN 978-0-615-15499-2.
- Peterson, Brian H.; Gerdts, William H. (2002). Pennsylvania Impressionism. University of Pennsylvania Press. ISBN 0-8122-3700-5.
- "Rae Sloan Bredin". Bredin Tree.
- "Rae Sloan Bredin". HL Chalfant.
- "Rae Sloan Bredin". Michener Art Museum.
