= Phillips Mill Historic District =

Historic district in Pennsylvania, United States

- U.S. National Register of Historic Places
- U.S. Historic district
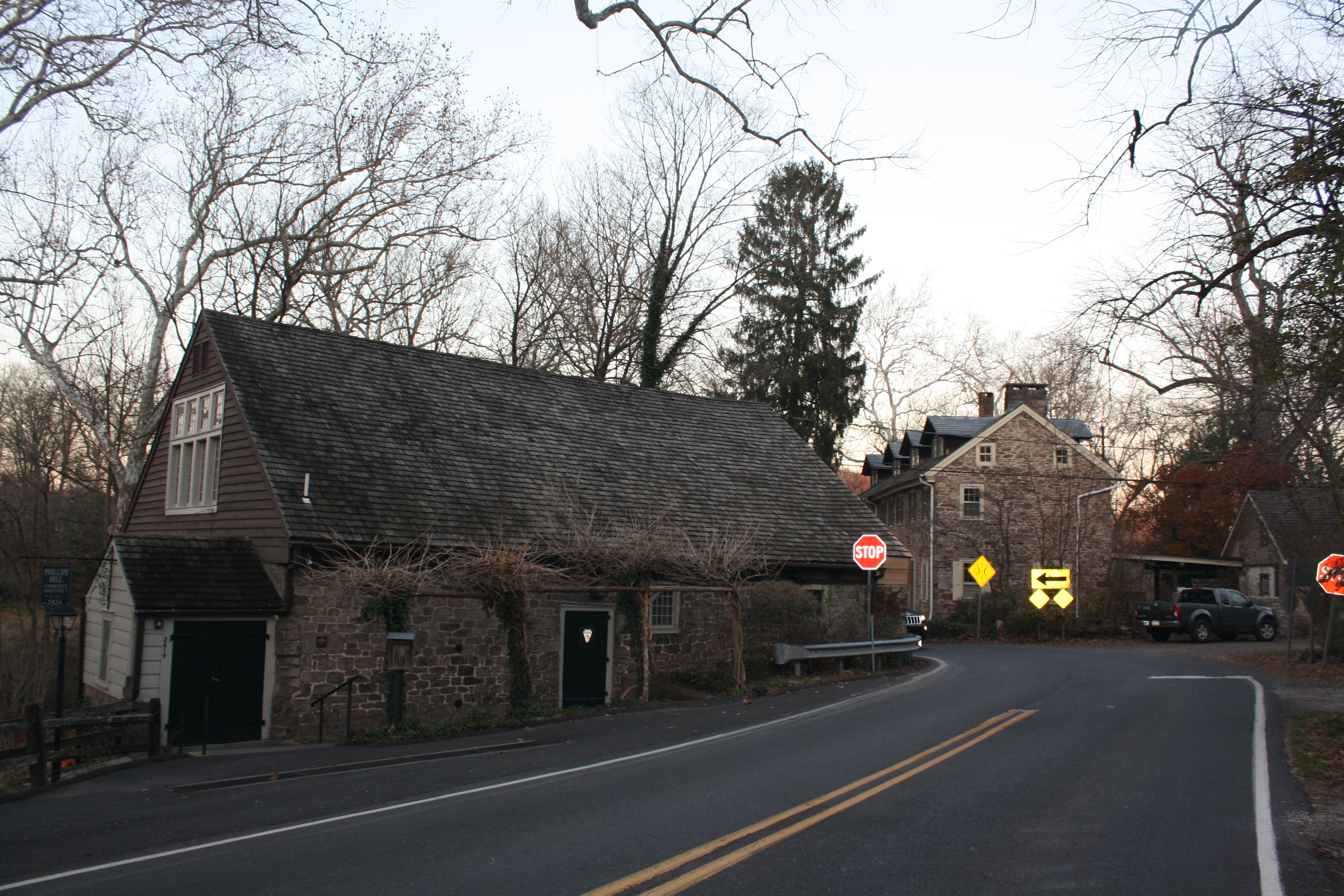
- Phillips Mill Historic District (River Rd.). November 2012.

- Location within Pennsylvania Location within the United States
- Location: River Rd. between Limeport and Chapel Rd., Solebury Township, Solebury Township, Pennsylvania
- Coordinates: 40°22′58″N 74°58′10″W
- Area: 29 acres (12 ha)
- Architect: Multiple
- Architectural style: Mixed (more Than 2 Styles From Different Periods)
- NRHP reference No.: 83002220
- Added to NRHP: June 30, 1983

The Phillips Mill Historic District is a national historic district that is located in Solebury Township, Bucks County, Pennsylvania.

It was added to the National Register of Historic Places in 1983.

== History and architectural features ==
This district includes thirty-four contributing buildings, one contributing site, and six contributing structures in the village of Phillips Mill. The district originally developed in the early eighteenth–century and is notable today as an artist's colony. It has the atmosphere of a picturesque old English village. Notable buildings and structures include the home of artist William L. Lathrop, the Phillips Mill Inn, West End Farm, Lenteboden, the Hotel du Village, Stone Cottage, and St. Philips Chapel.

== Gallery ==
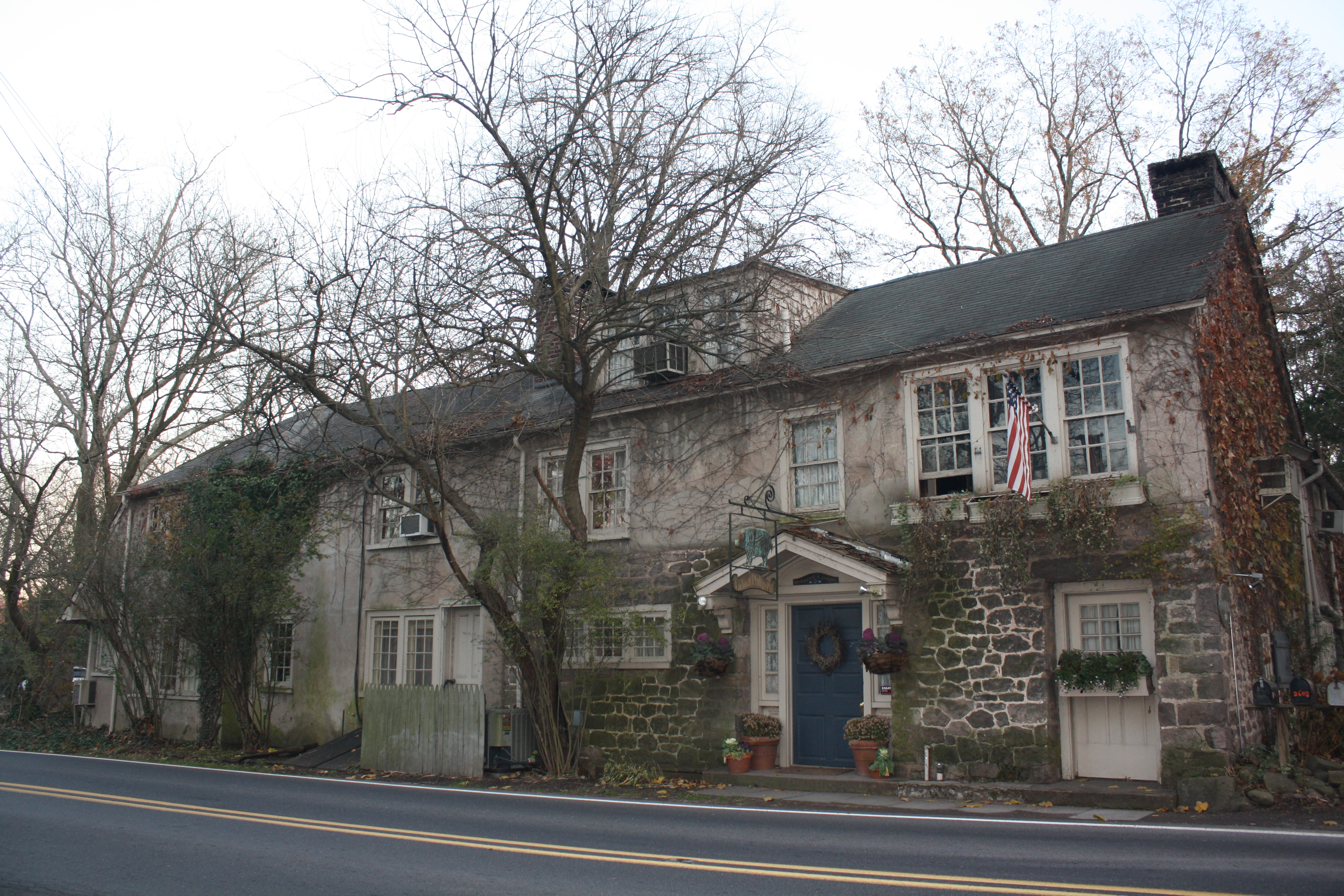
Inn at Phillips Mill

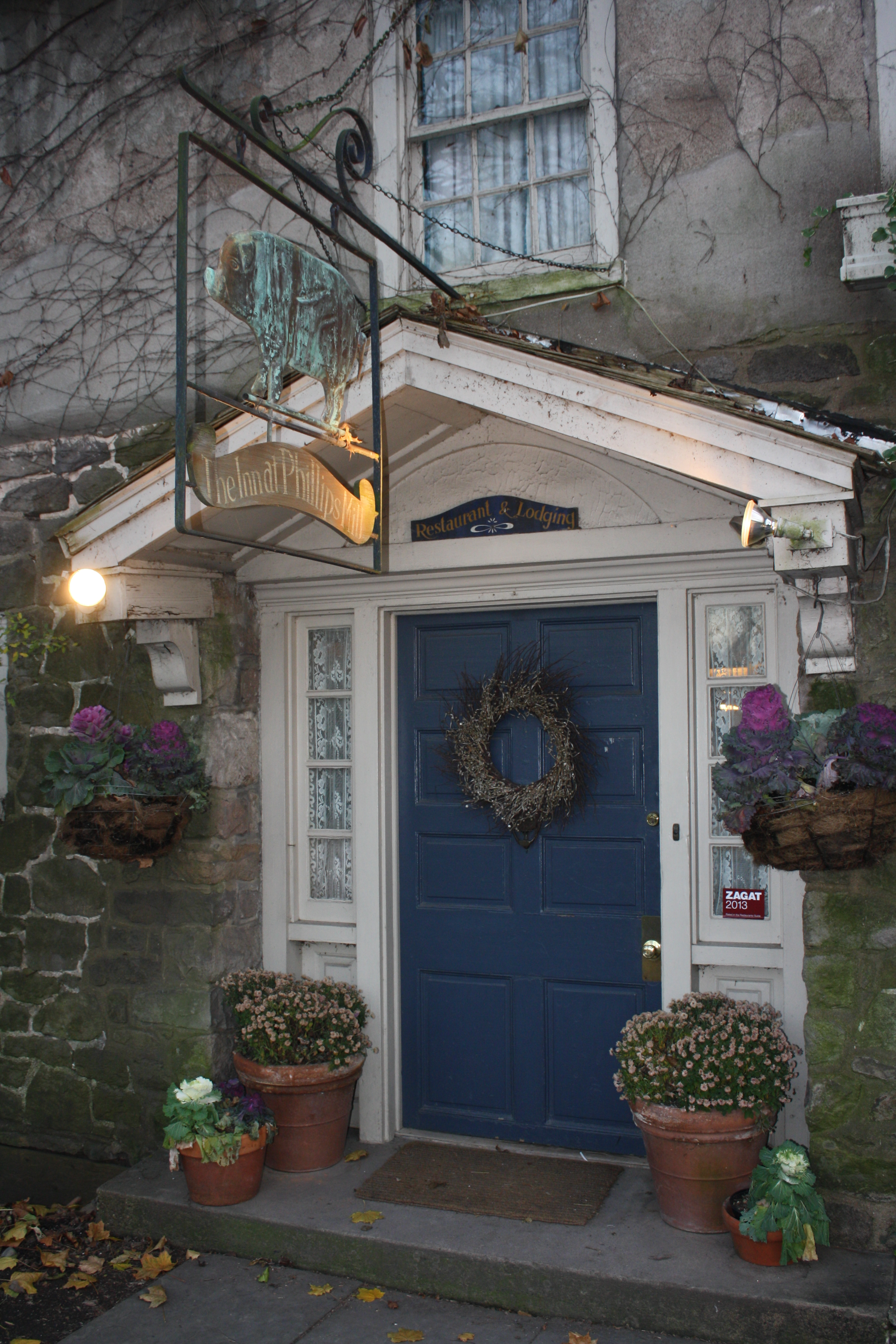
Inn at Phillips Mill

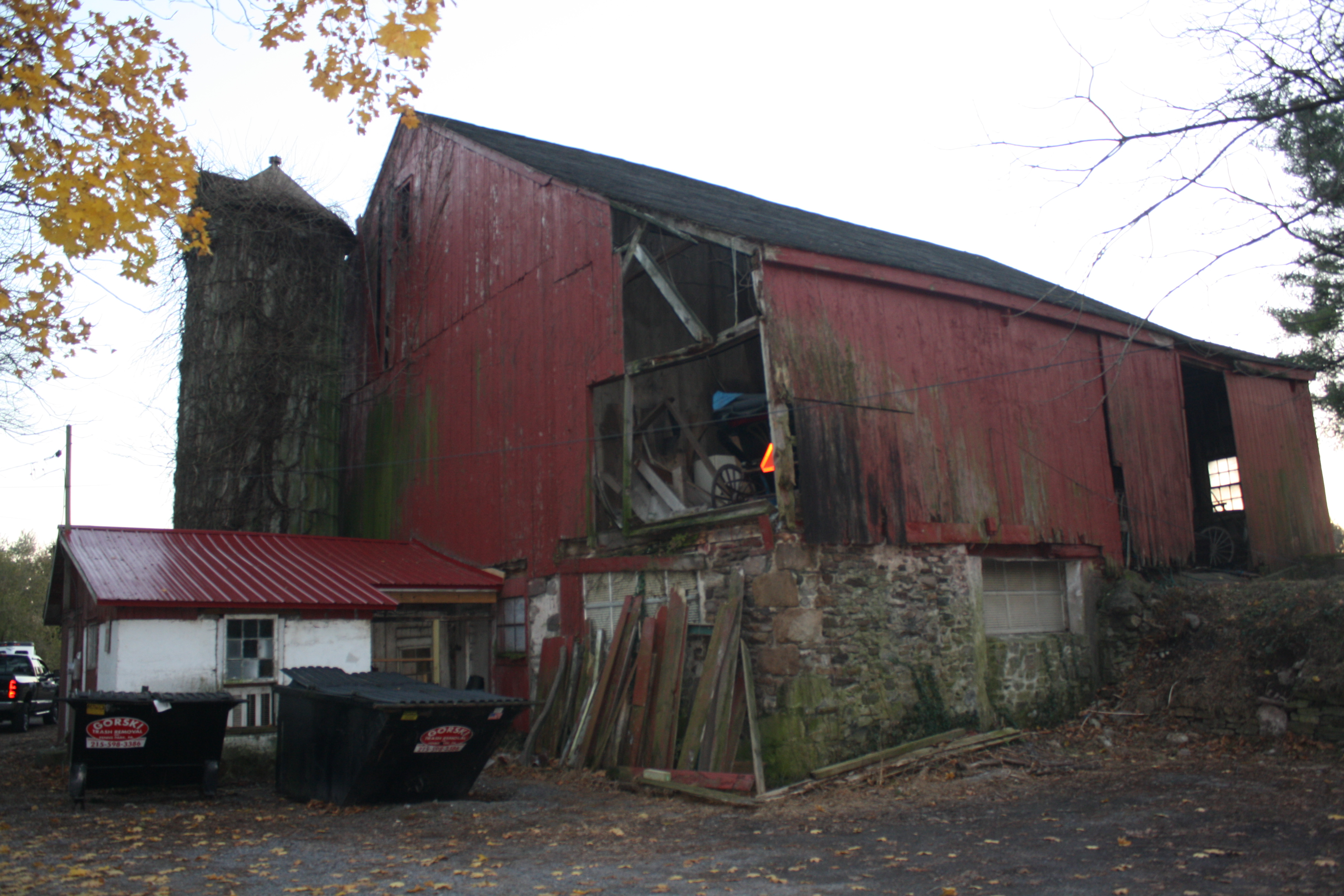
Barn

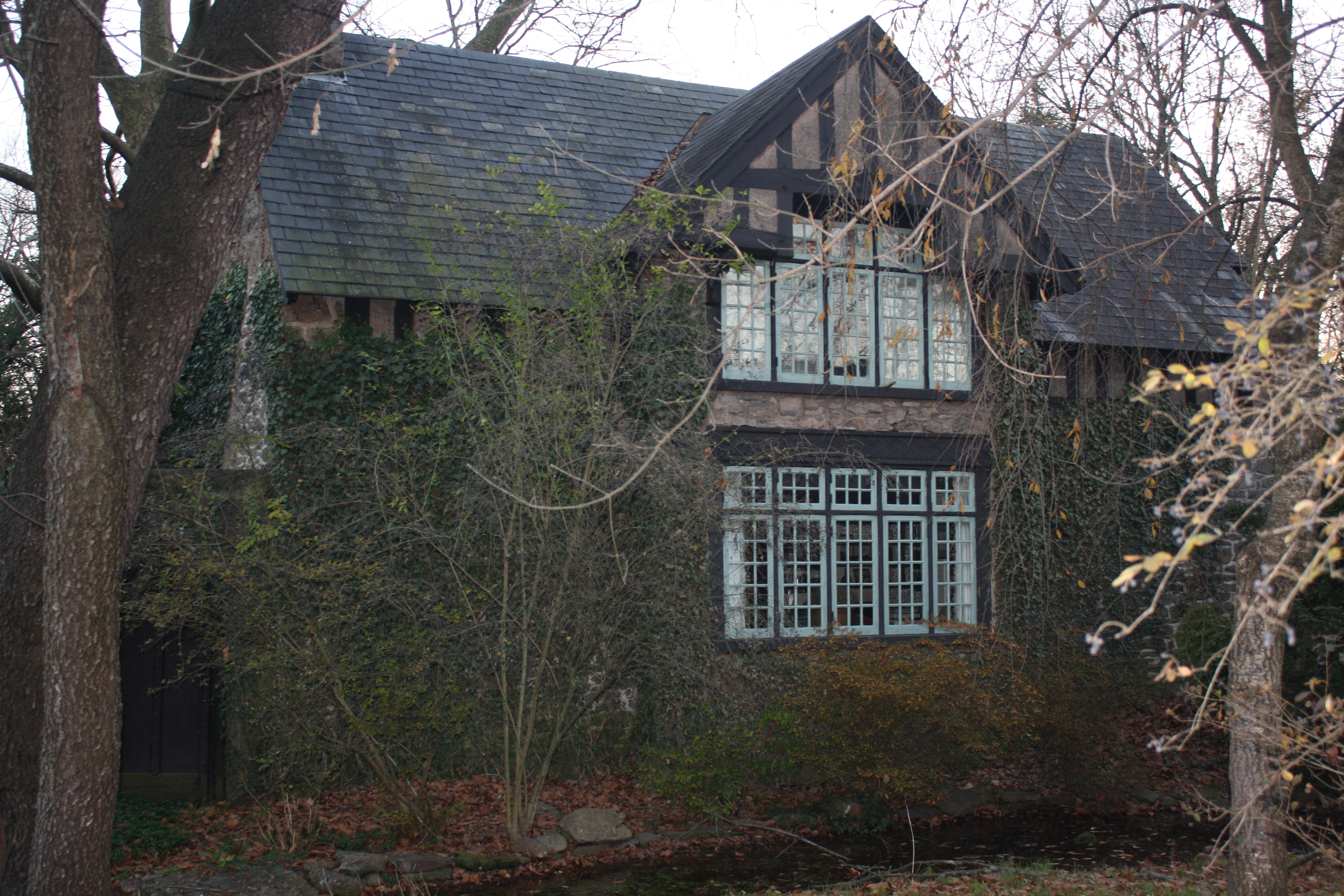
Residence at Phillips Mill

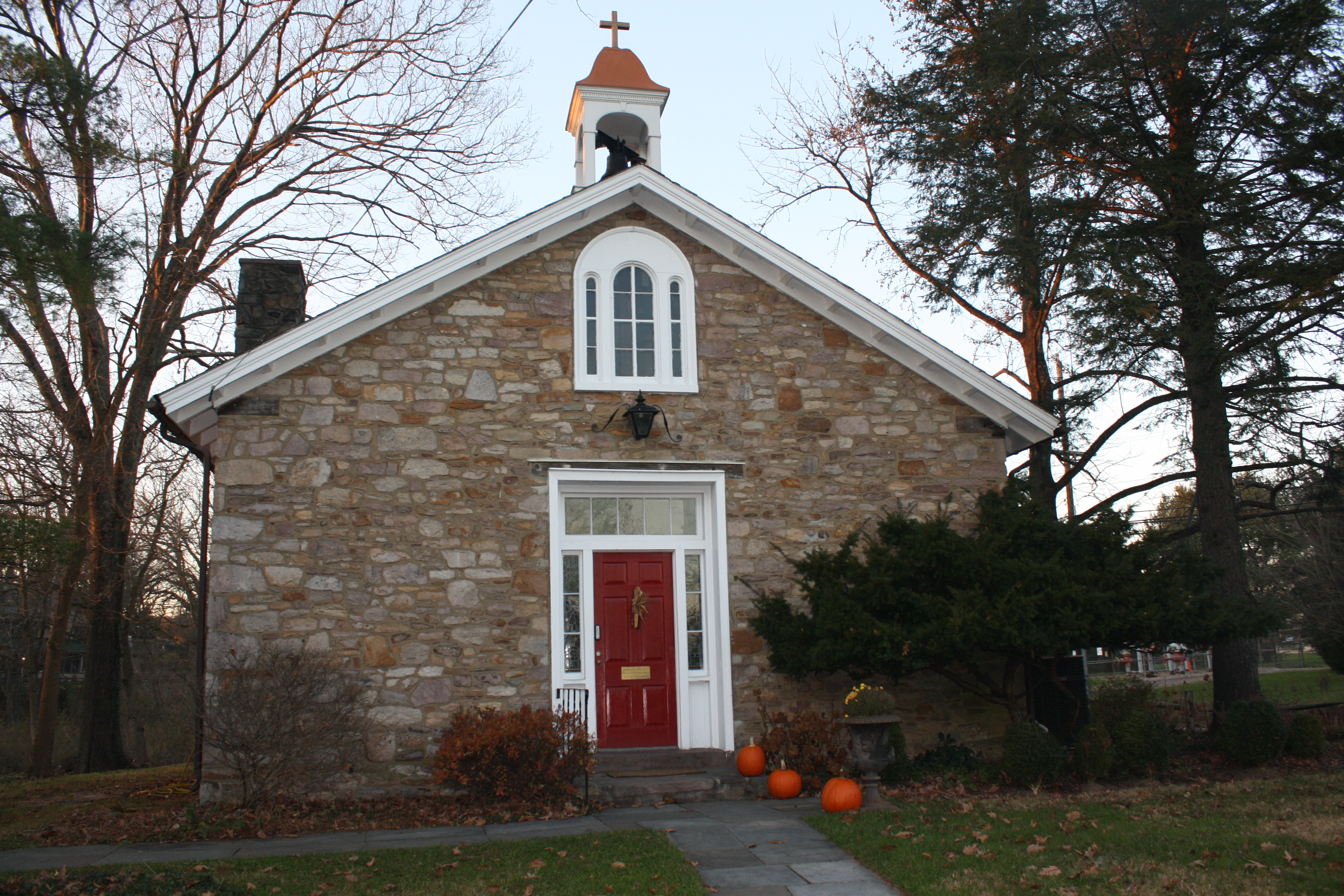
St. Philip's Episcopal Church
