= William Langson Lathrop =

American painter

- Born: March 29, 1859; Painesville, Ohio, U.S.
- Died: September 21, 1938 (aged 79); Montauk, New York, U.S.
- Known for: Painting
- Movement: Pennsylvania Impressionism

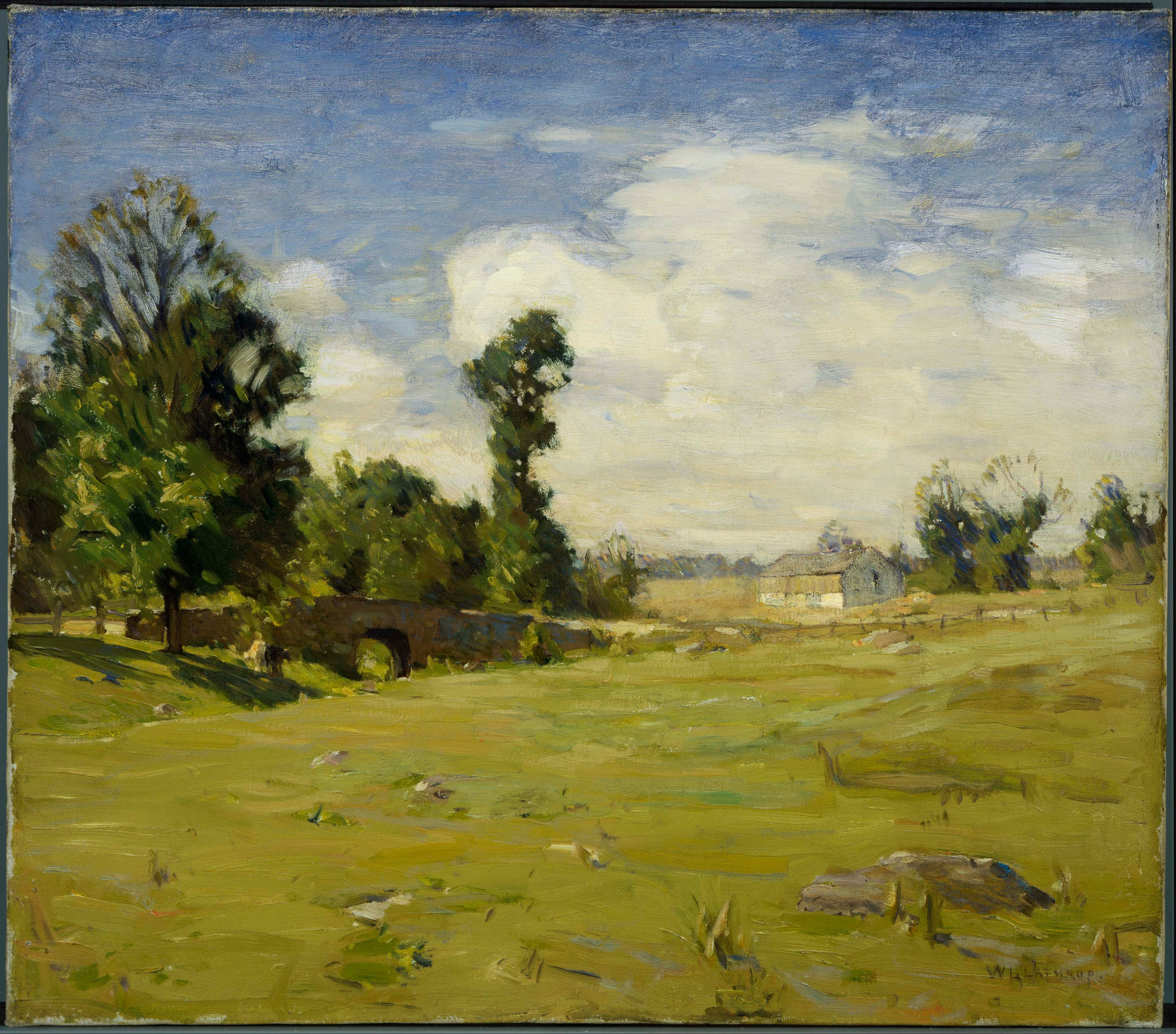
Ely's Bridge by Lathrop

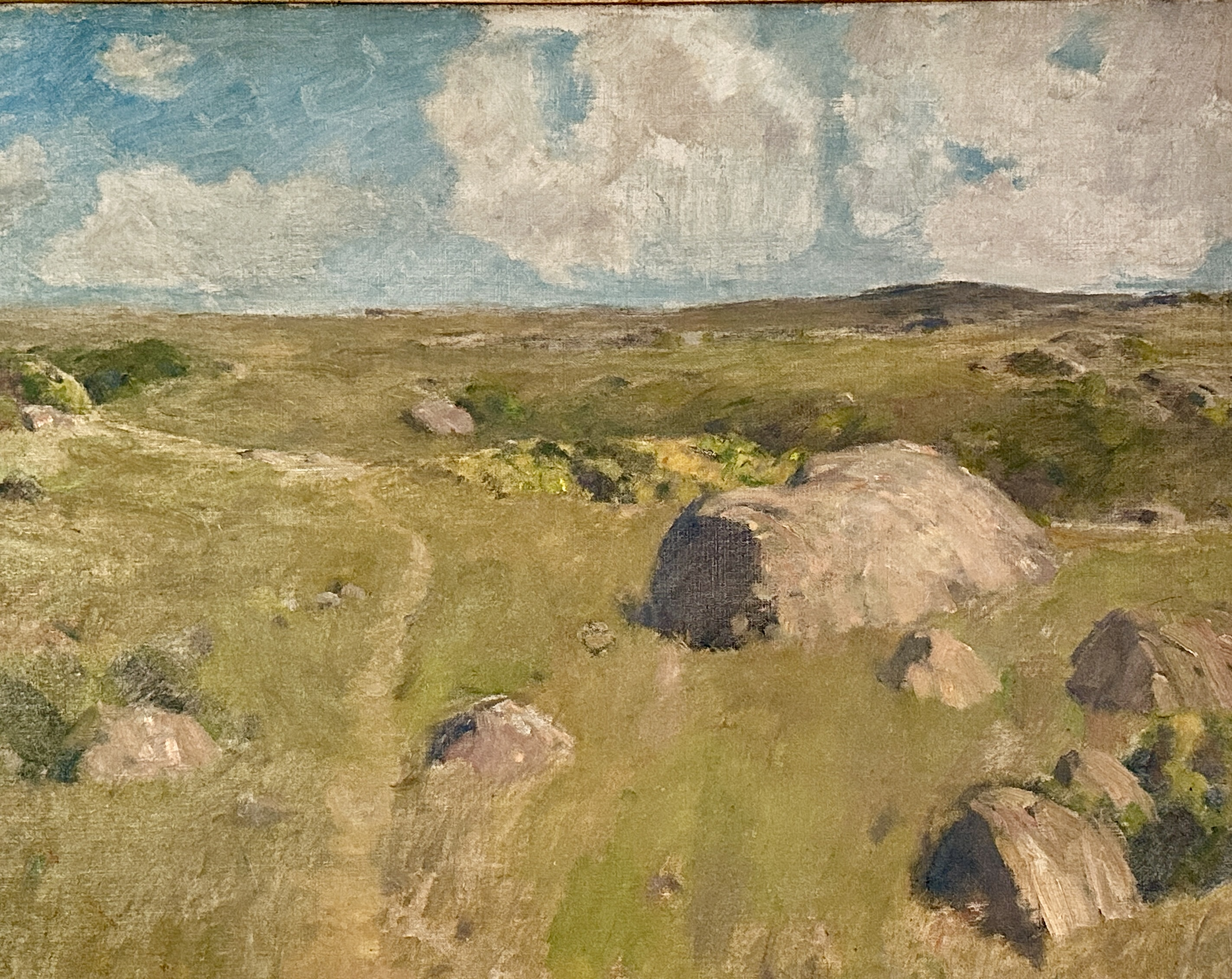
"Martha's Vineyard Pasture," 25 x 30 inches, by William Langson Lathrop.

William Langson Lathrop (pronounced "LAY-throp") (March 29, 1859 – September 21, 1938) was an American Impressionist landscape painter and founder of the art colony in New Hope, Pennsylvania, where he was an influential founder of Pennsylvania Impressionism.

Lathrop was a member of the National Academy of Design and served on numerous exhibition juries during his career. He received a gold medal at the Panama–Pacific International Exposition (1915) in San Francisco, which showcased works by many of the major American artists of the time.

Lathrop's paintings are now on display in multiple museums, including the Metropolitan Museum of Art in New York City and the Smithsonian American Art Museum in Washington, D.C.

== Early life ==
Lathrop was born in Painesville, Ohio and grew up on his family's farm. He spent his childhood along the shores of Lake Erie, where he learned to sail.

== Career ==
Lathrop began his art career in New York City in the late 1870s as an illustrator and part-time etcher, but neither earned him much money. After traveling to Europe in the 1880s, Lathrop returned to the United States, where he endured financial difficulty and briefly turned away from art before friends convinced him to enter his watercolors in a prestigious New York City show. Lathrop received the top prize and a glowing review in The New York Times, which launched his career.

In 1899, Lathrop and several art students studying under him relocated to New Hope, Pennsylvania along the Delaware River in Bucks County, Pennsylvania. Lathrop often invited his students to join him on his barge, which he called "Sunshine," offering the students an opportunity to sketch the passing landscape. Similar to William Merritt Chase's classes in the Shinnecock Hills of Long Island and L. Birge Harrison's landscape classes for the Art Students League in Woodstock, New York, Lathrop's outdoor landscape painting classes laid the seeds for the development of an American art colony.

For more than thirty years, Lathrop pursued landscape painting in New Hope, exhibiting his works in galleries across the nation. During this time Lathrop's painting style evolved from tonalist, characterized by darker colors and an emphasis on mood, to the brighter impressionist paintings for which he is best remembered today.

In 1916, six local artists formed "The New Hope Group," including Lathrop, Charles Rosen, Daniel Garber, Morgan Colt, Rae Sloan Bredin, and Robert Spencer. All lived in close proximity to each other near the Delaware River. The group exhibited their work together and were representative of the influential Pennsylvania Impressionism school of landscape painting.

The New Hope Group only exhibited from 1916 to 1917. With the exception of Redfield, however, they formed the early core of this school, exhibiting at Cincinnati Art Museum in Cincinnati, Detroit Art Institute in Detroit, Corcoran Gallery in Washington, D.C., Carnegie Museums in Pittsburgh, Arlington Gallery in New York City, and other places.

Lathrop was instrumental in the founding of Phillips Mill, an 18th-century stone mill that became the leading exhibition location for the New Hope Art Colony of Pennsylvania impressionists. The mill was located opposite Lathrop's home on River Road, north of New Hope. In October 1928, local artist William Taylor was appointed to head a subscription committee for the purchase of the mill as a community center. The mill was purchased for $5,000.00, and Lathrop became the mill's first president.

== Personal life ==
In the late 1880s, Lathrop traveled to Europe, where he met and married his wife, Annie. Their children included Julian W. Lanthrop, Joseoph Lanthrop, and Mrs. Rols Bauhan. In 1899, Lathrop and his family moved to New Hope, Pennsylvania, where they resided on River Road near the present-day Phillips Mill Historic District. Lanthrop's wife Annie was hostess to large numbers of visitors at her Sunday afternoon teas, which included Margaret Fulton Spencer and other artists who eventually moved to the area to study under Lanthrop. Charles Rosen, Robert Spencer, Rae Sloan Bredin, Mary Elizabeth Price, and John Folinsbee were frequent visitors.

In the late 1920s, Lathrop hand-built a wooden boat in his backyard and named it The Widge. Measuring over twenty feet in length, Lathrop and his friends launched The Widge into the Delaware River in 1930. Lathrop, an able sailor, piloted the boat into the coastal waters of the enjoining Atlantic Ocean. He continued sailing for pleasure in his later years, and painted scenes of the Atlantic shoreline and once entertained Albert Einstein on board as a guest.

== Death ==
On September 21, 1938, Lathrop was piloting his boat around eastern Mountauk Point in Long Island when word came of an approaching hurricane. Far from safe harbor, Lathrop chose to ride out the storm in a sheltered bay. While The Widge survived the storm, Lathrop's body was recovered along the shoreline a month later. Eyewitness accounts of Lathrop from occupants of nearby boats suggest he may have died of a heart attack during the storm, and been blown or washed from his boat. However, his last painting survived the hurricane.
