= Curls Run (Pidcock Creek tributary) =

Curls Run Kirl, Kyrl, Carl, Curl, Curtis Run
- Location within Pennsylvania

Location
- Country: United States
- State: Pennsylvania
- County: Bucks
- Township: Wrightstown, Upper Makefield, Solebury

Physical characteristics
- Source
  - coordinates: 40°17′56″N 75°0′21″W
  - elevation: 210 feet (64 m)
- Mouth
  - coordinates: 40°19′21″N 74°58′32″W
  - elevation: 102 feet (31 m)
- Length: 2.47 miles (3.98 km)

Basin features
- Progression: Curls Run → Pidcock Creek → Delaware River → Delaware Bay
- River system: Delaware River
- Bridges: Township Line Road; Street Road
- Slope: 43.72 feet per mile (8.280 m/km)

Curls Run (Kirl, Kyrl, Carl, Curl) is a tributary of Pidcock Creek in Bucks County, Pennsylvania, part of the Delaware River drainage basin.

== History ==
Curls Run was named for Thomas Kirl, an early landowner in Buckingham Township, Bucks County, Pennsylvania, in the United States, whose land was later purchased by Robert Smith in 1723. Other landowners along the creek were Harry Trego, Earl Daniels, John Hogan, Harvey R. Smith, William E. Smith, Charles R. Wentz, Charles W. Livezey, and Lettie A. Betts. It was first mentioned in 1789 in an agreement to set off land for a schoolhouse referred to as the 'Red Schoolhouse'. In the Atlas of Bucks County by E. P. Noll & Co. in 1891, it was referred to erroneously as 'Curtis Run'.

== Statistics ==
Curls Run was entered into the Geographic Names Information System of the U.S. Geological Survey on 1 April 1990 as identification number 1202642.

== Course ==
Curls Run rises in Upper Makefield Township, just east of Pineville, starting out northeast, then turns to the north flowing through an unnamed pond, passing into Buckingham Township, then flowing to the northeast until it meets its confluence at Pidcock Creek's 3.21 river mile in Solebury Township.

== Municipalities ==
- Solebury Township
- Buckingham Township
- Upper Makefield Township

== Bridges and Crossings ==
- Township Line Road
- Street Road
