= Center Bridge Historic District =

Historic district in Pennsylvania, United States

- U.S. National Register of Historic Places
- U.S. Historic district
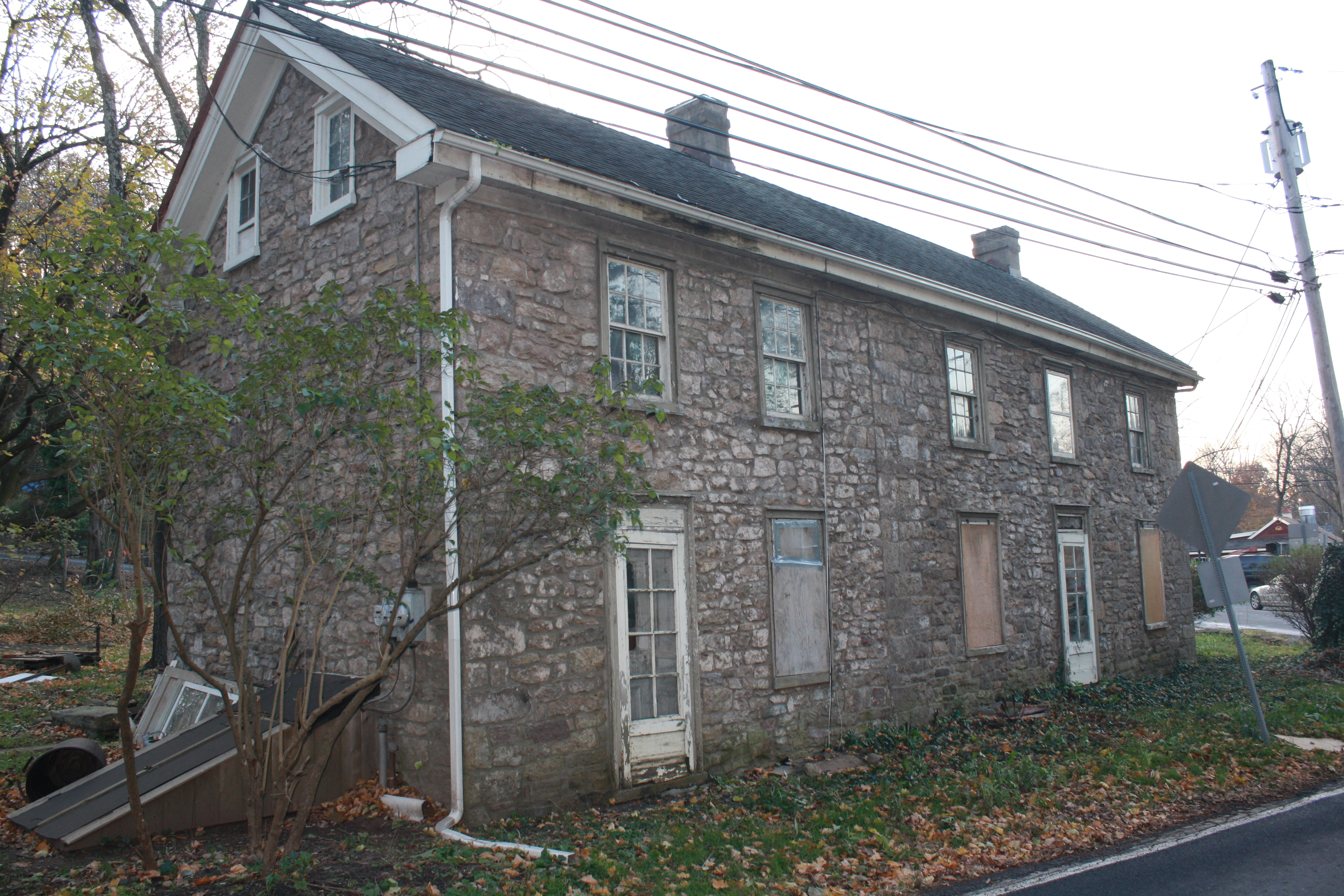
- Center Bridge Historic District. November 2012.

- Location within Pennsylvania Location within the United States
- Location: Bounded by Ely and Laurel Rds. on River Rd., Solebury Township, Pennsylvania
- Coordinates: 40°24′02″N 74°58′48″W
- Area: 40 acres (16 ha)
- Architectural style: Late 19th And 20th Century Revivals, Colonial
- NRHP reference No.: 85000673
- Added to NRHP: March 26, 1985

Center Bridge Historic District is a national historic district located in Solebury Township, Bucks County, Pennsylvania. The district includes 60 contributing buildings, 2 contributing sites, and 3 contributing structures in the village of Center Bridge. Notable buildings are the William Mitchell / Edward R. Redfield House (1815, 1930s) and a unique row of two-family workers' dwellings. Also located in the district is the separately listed Isaiah Paxson Farm.

It was added to the National Register of Historic Places in 1985.

== Gallery ==
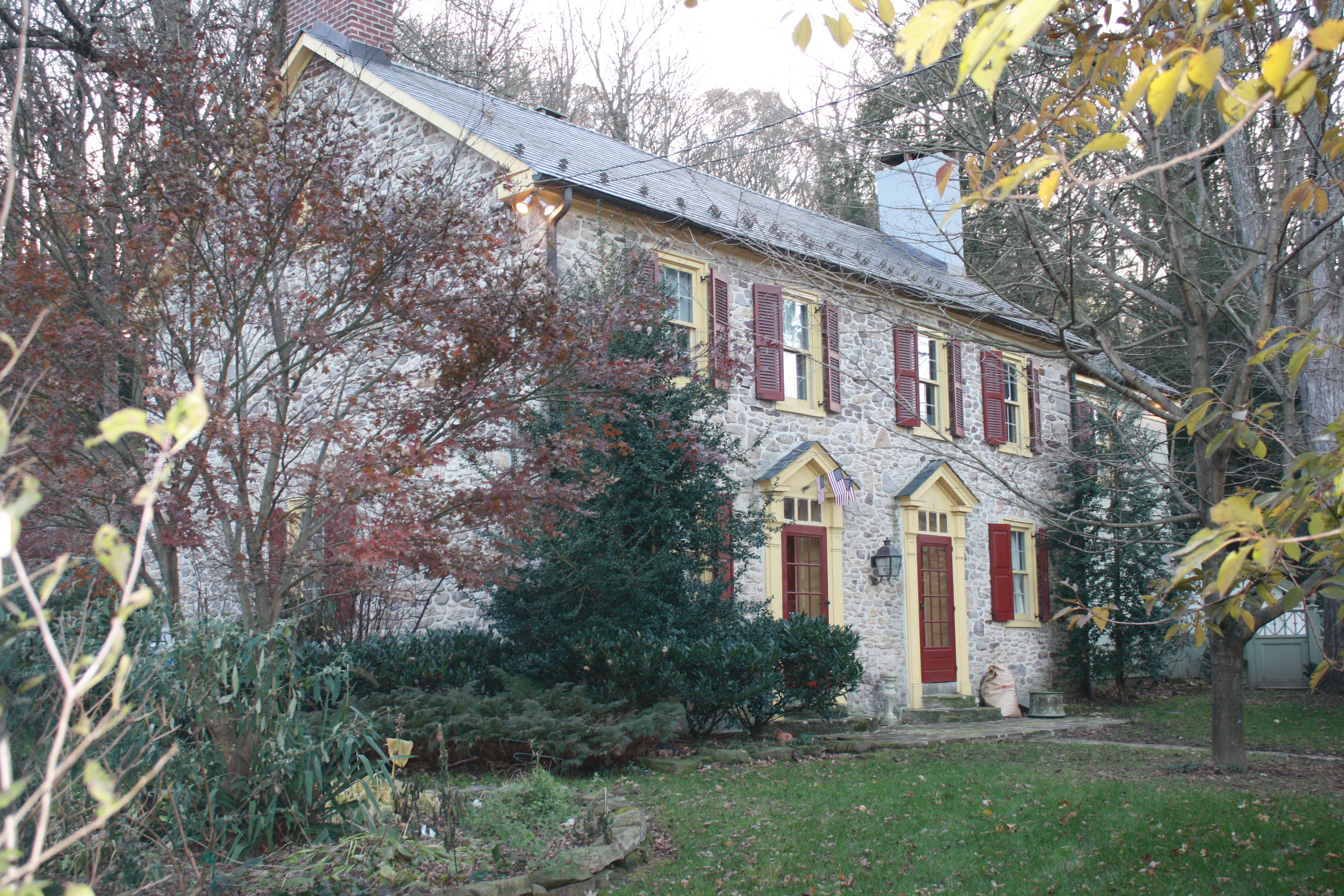

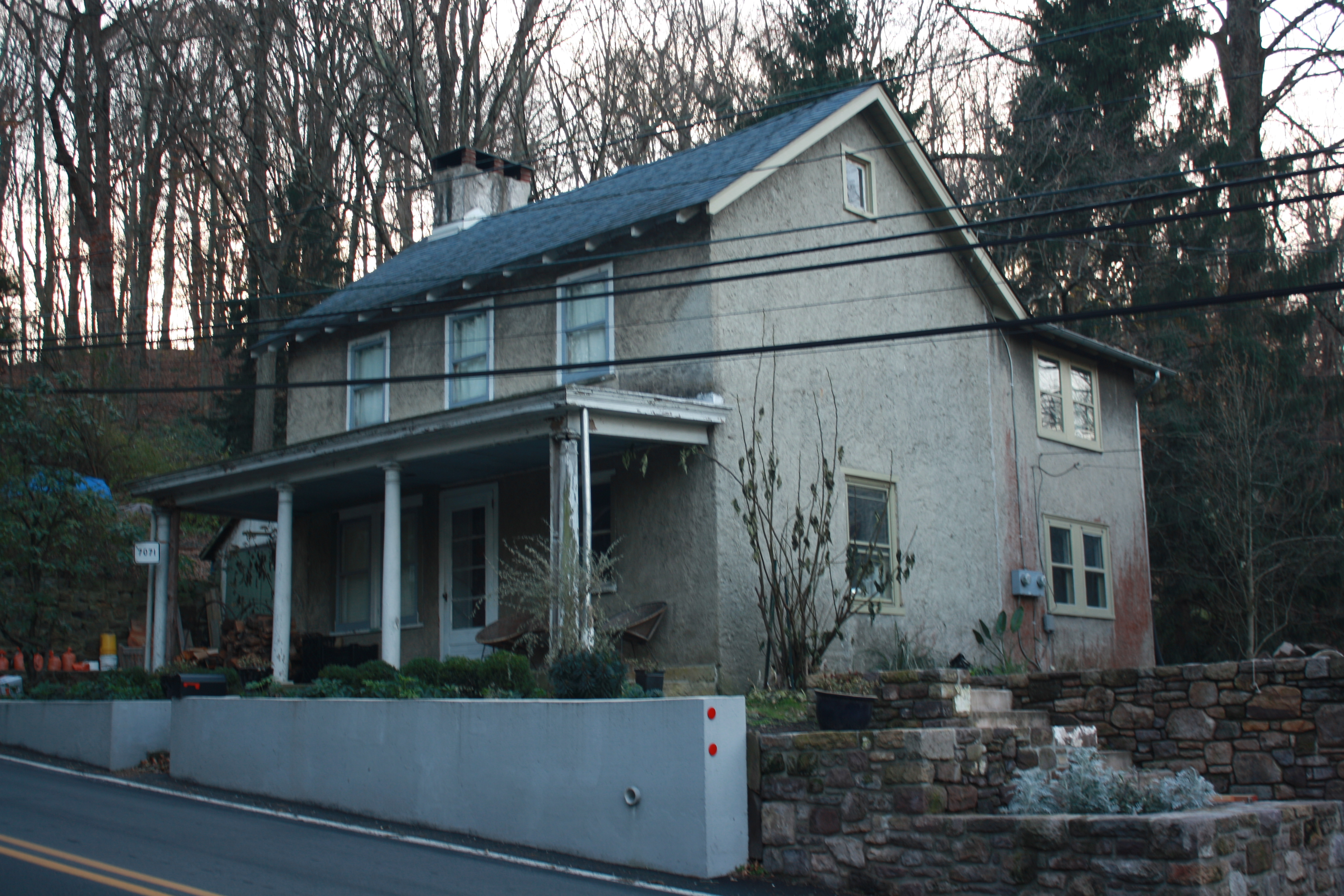

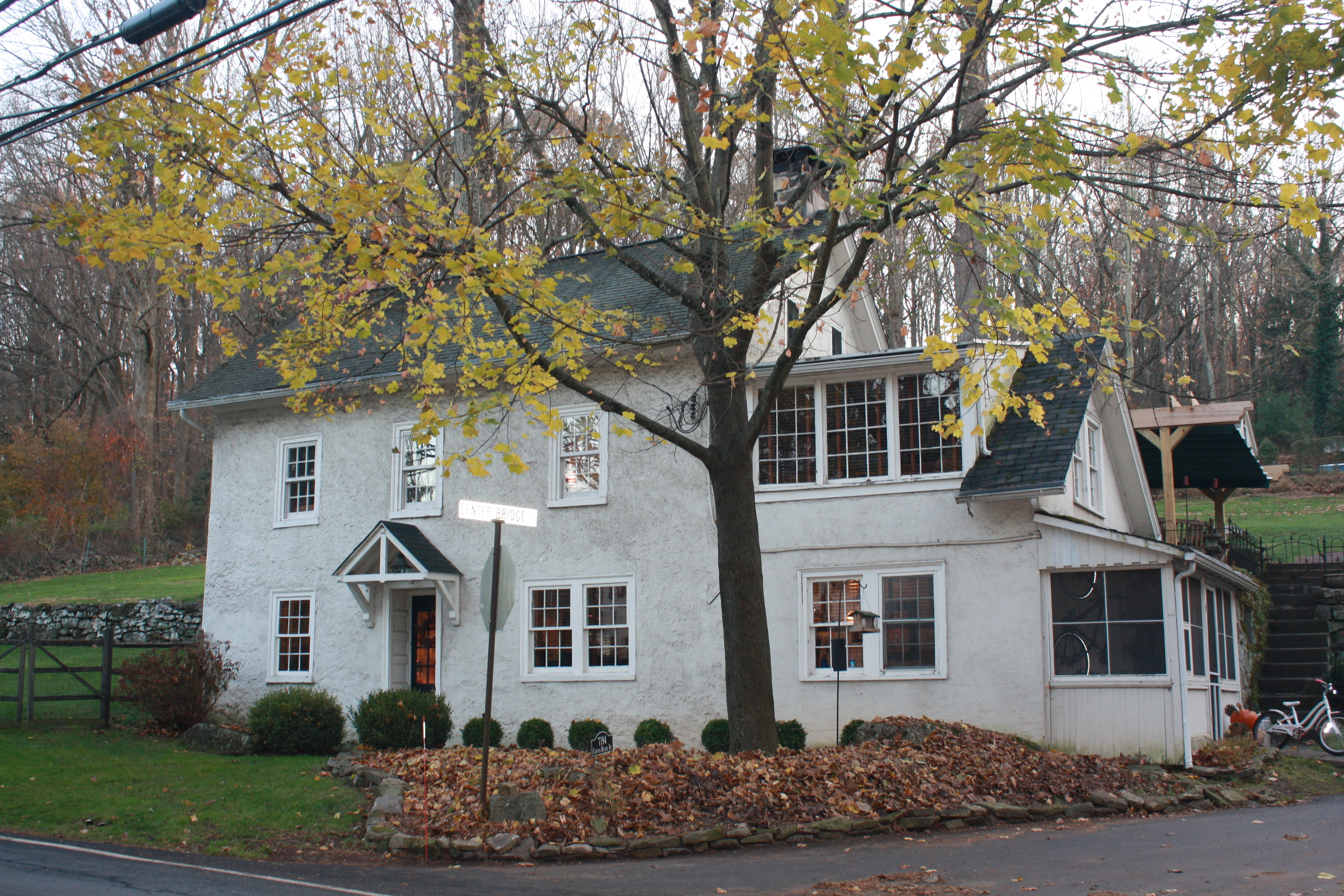

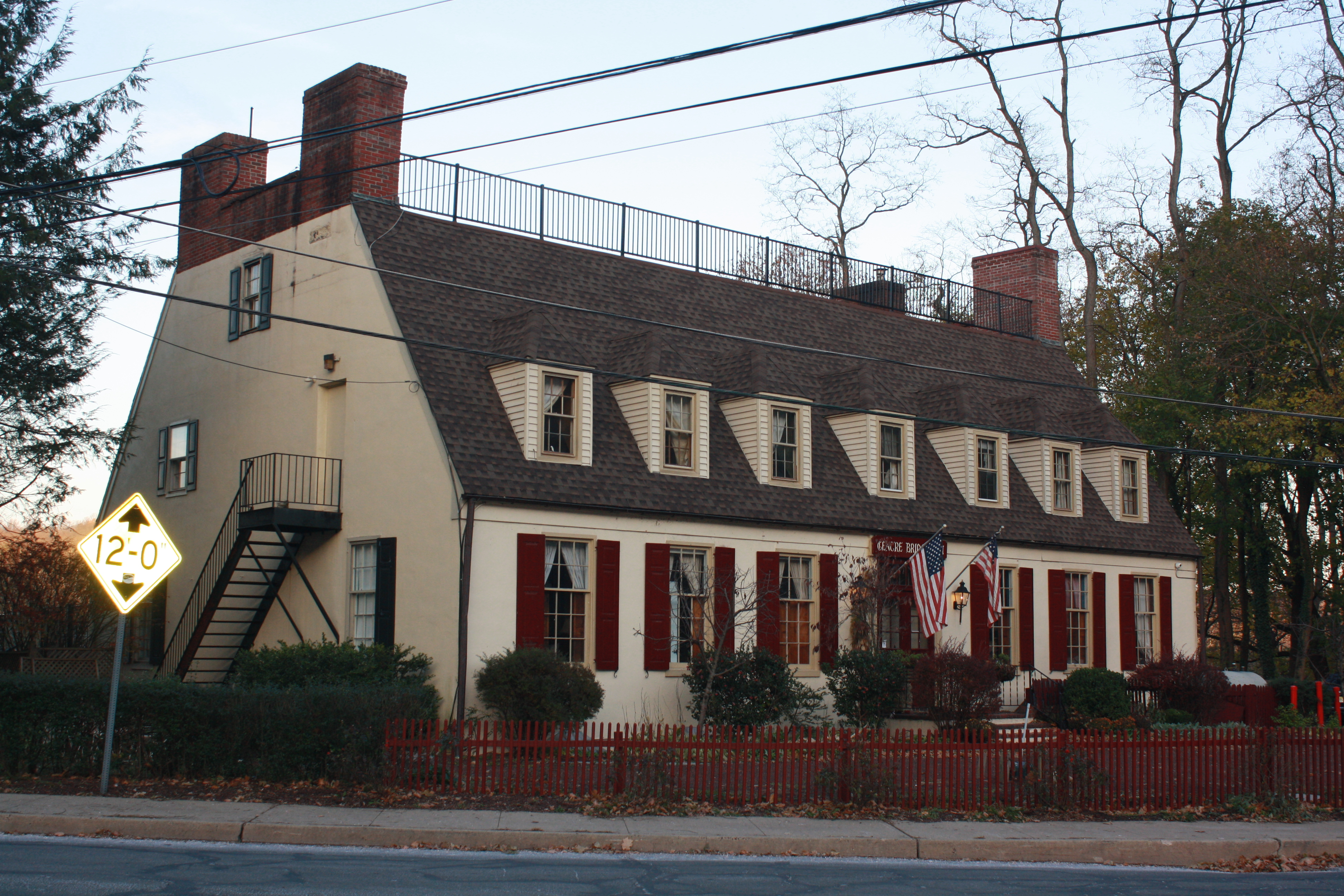
