= Upper Aquetong Valley Historic District =

Historic district in Pennsylvania, United States

- U.S. National Register of Historic Places
- U.S. Historic district
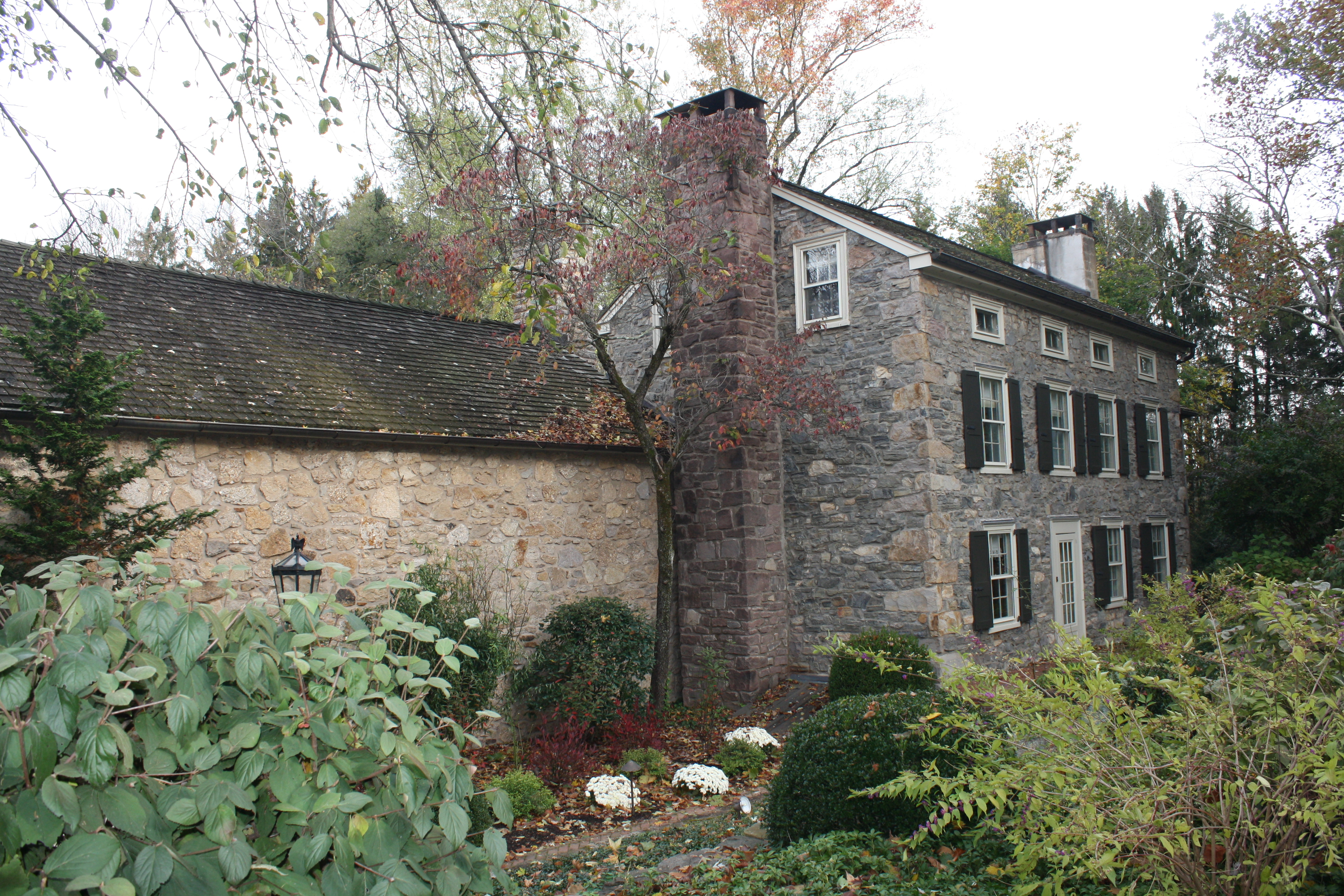
- Upper Aquetong Valley Historic District. November 2012.

- Location within Pennsylvania Location within the United States
- Location: Meeting House and Aquetong Rds., between US 202 and Sugan Rd., Solebury Township, Pennsylvania
- Coordinates: 40°21′44″N 75°00′07″W
- Area: 1,275 acres (516 ha)
- Architectural style: Georgian, Federal
- NRHP reference No.: 87001216
- Added to NRHP: July 30, 1987

The Upper Aquetong Valley Historic District is a national historic district that is located in Solebury Township, Bucks County, Pennsylvania.

It was added to the National Register of Historic Places in 1987.

== History and architectural features ==
This district emcompasses fifty-five contributing buildings, three contributing sites, and eleven contributing structures that are located along Meeting House Road and the upper branch of Aquetong Creek. This district, which overlaps with the Honey Hollow Watershed National Historic Landmark, also encompasses a dozen farmsteads composed of eighteenth and nineteenth-century farmhouses with their associated outbuildings. A number of the houses exhibit vernacular, Federal and Georgian-style details.

Architecturally notable buildings include the Solebury Meeting House (c. 1806) and the Federal style John Blackfan House (c. 1836).
