= Cuttalossa Valley Historic District =

Historic district in Pennsylvania, United States

- U.S. National Register of Historic Places
- U.S. Historic district
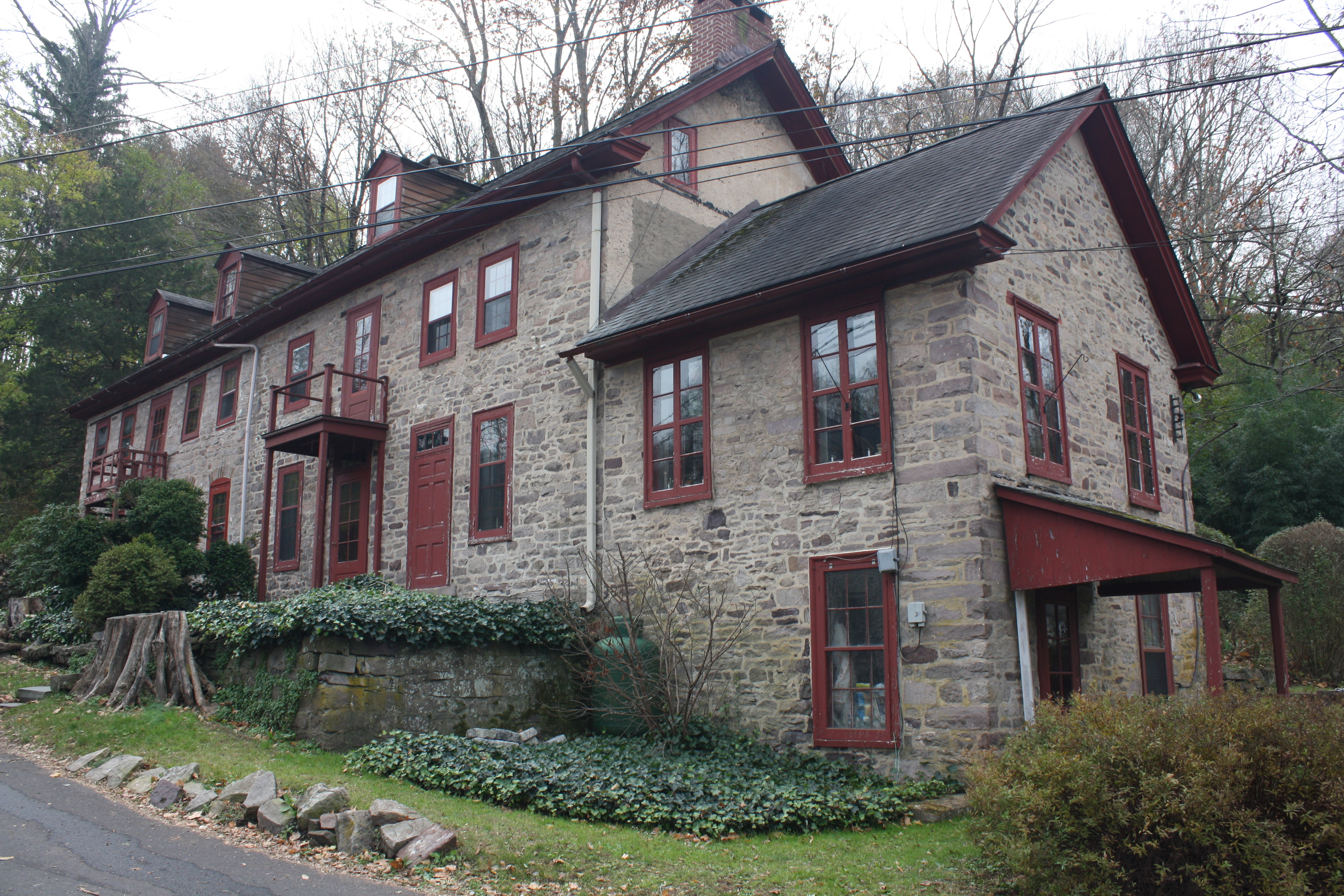
- Cuttalossa Valley Historic District. Hard Times Tavern. November 2012.

- Location within Pennsylvania Location within the United States
- Location: Cuttalossa Rd. from Sugan Rd. to the Delaware R., Solebury Township, Pennsylvania
- Coordinates: 40°23′38″N 75°01′26″W
- Area: 90 acres (36 ha)
- Architectural style: Georgian, Federal, et al.
- NRHP reference No.: 02000705
- Added to NRHP: June 27, 2002

Cuttalossa Valley Historic District is a national historic district located in Solebury Township, Bucks County, Pennsylvania. The district includes 23 contributing buildings, 10 contributing sites, and 4 contributing structures along the narrow valley of Cuttalossa Creek. The district encompasses a variety of resources including dwellings, outbuildings, a mill, bridges, a fountain, and the remains of mills, dams, and mill races. A number of the buildings exhibit vernacular Federal and Georgian style details. Notable buildings include the Hard Times Tavern (c. 1750), Samuel Armitage House, Hill House, Watson Kenderline House, Cuttalossa Inn, and Laurelton.

It was added to the National Register of Historic Places in 2002.

== Gallery ==
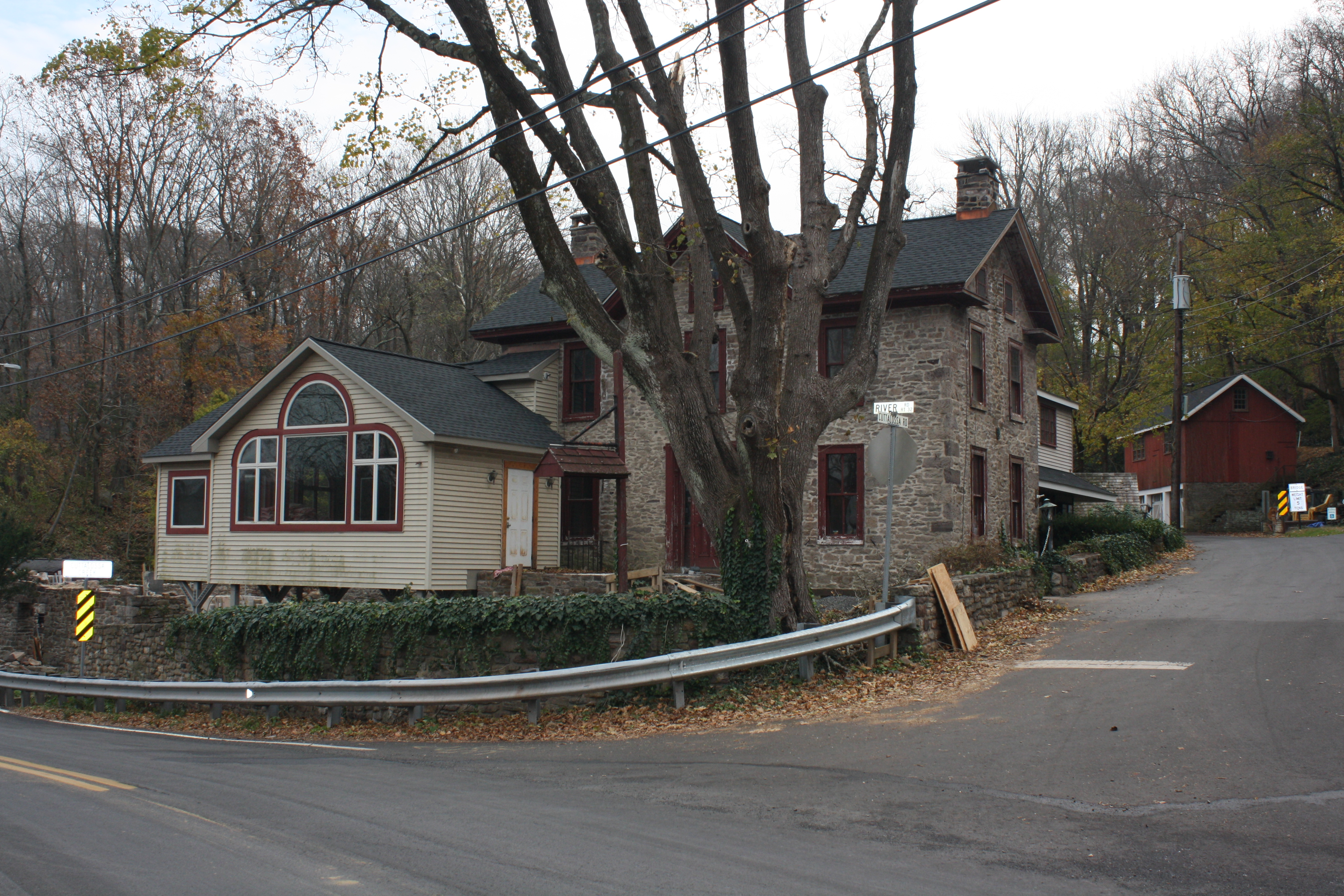
Cuttalossa Inn.

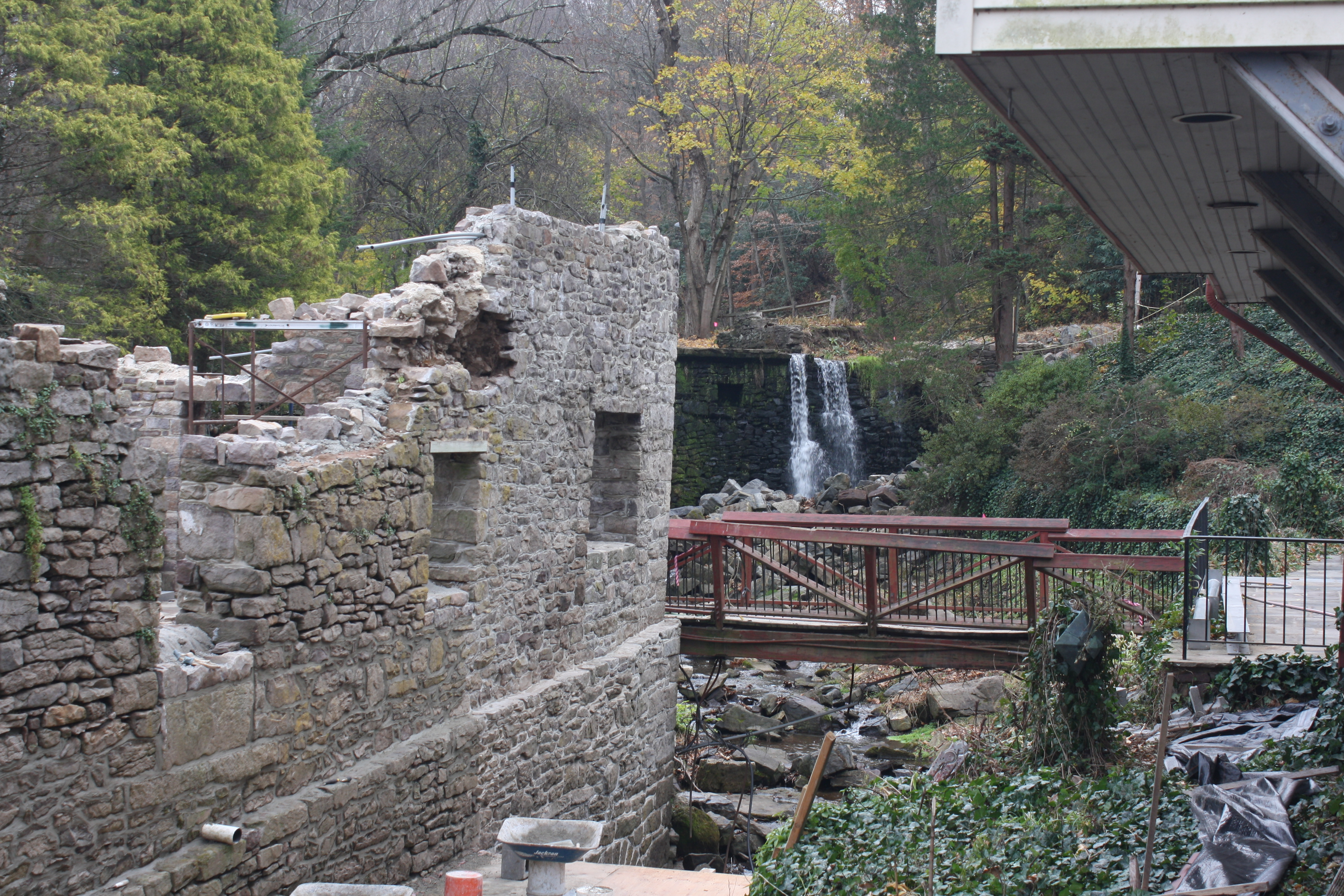
John Kenderdine Mill Remnants.

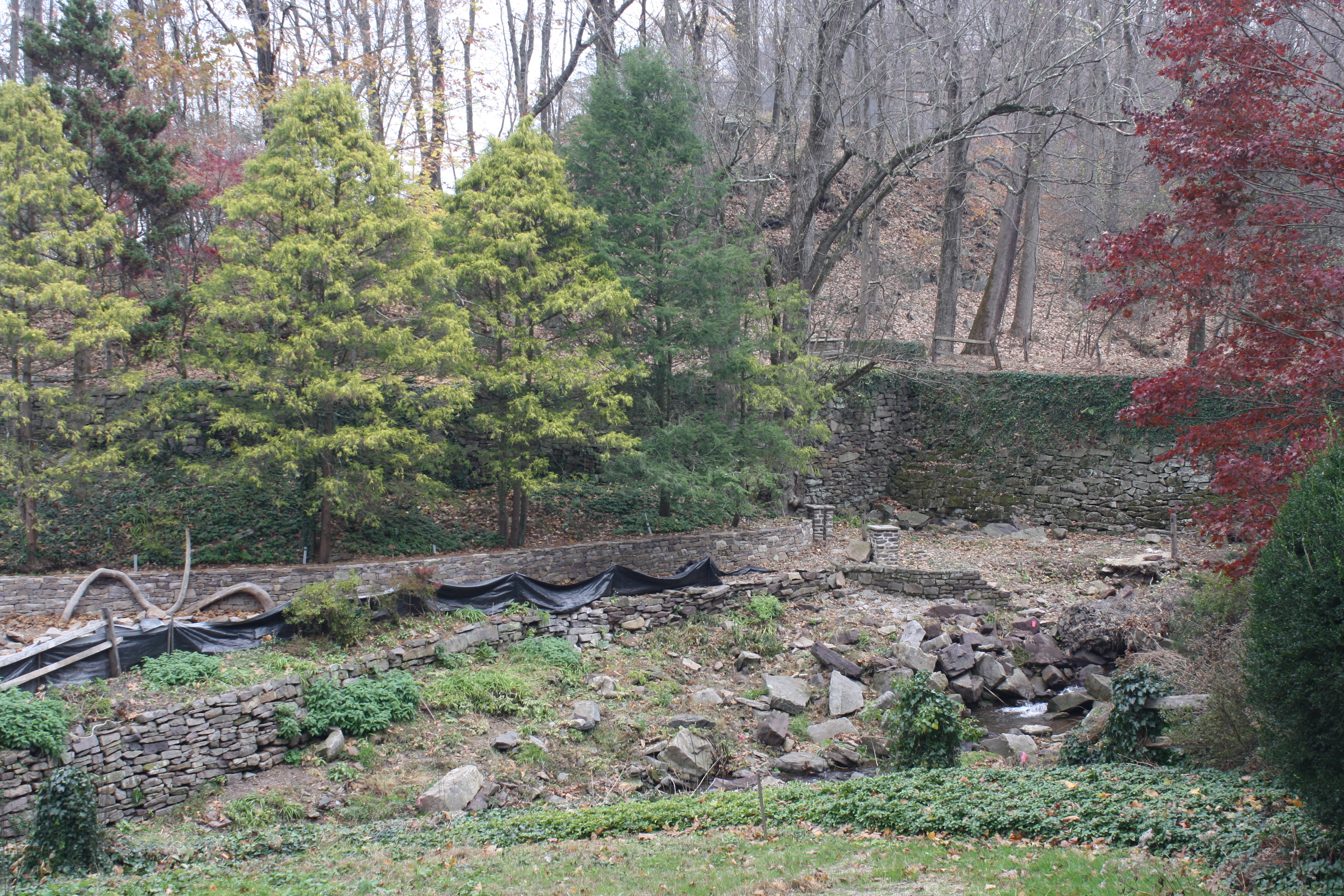
John Kenderdine Mill Remnants.

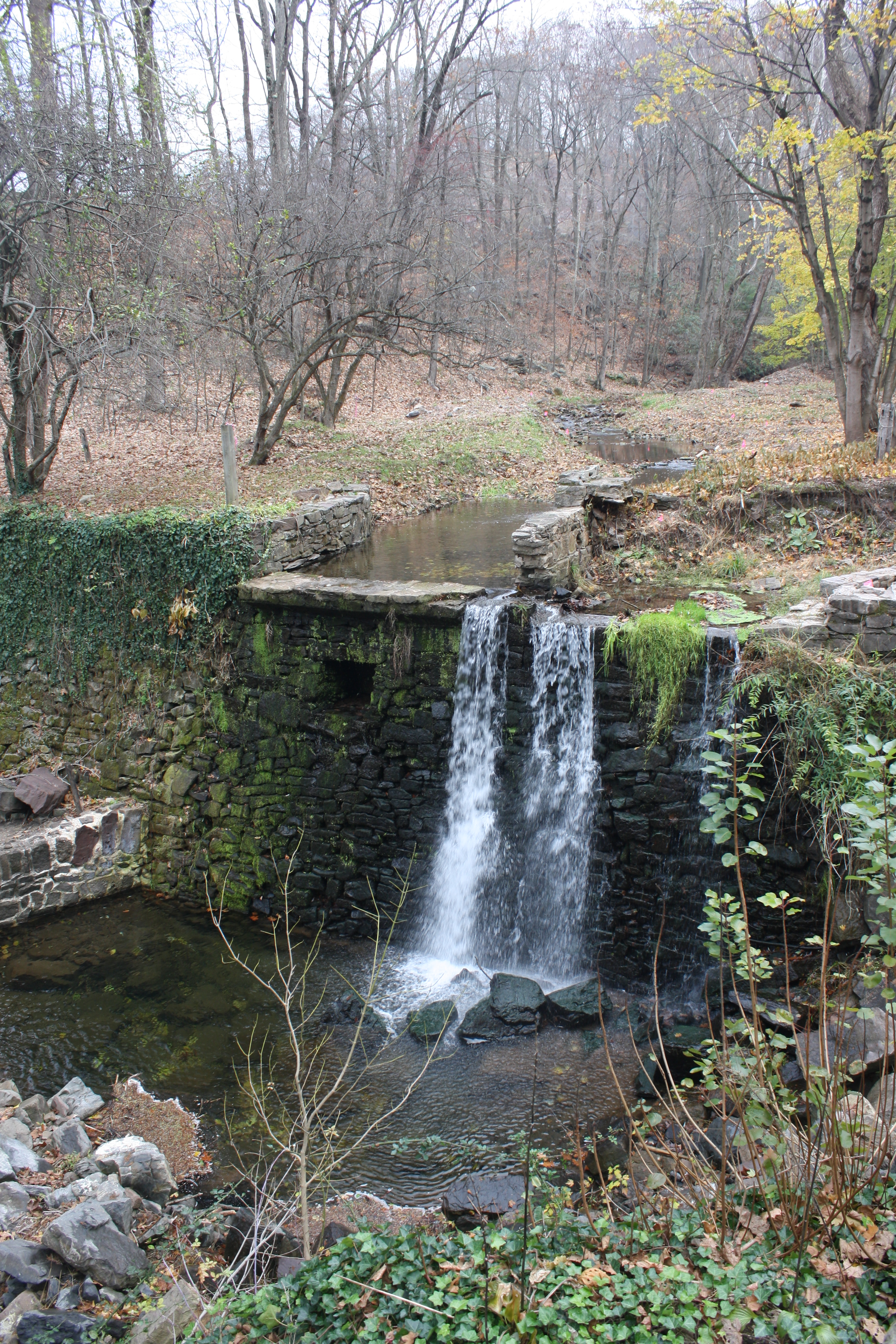
John Kenderdine Mill Dam.

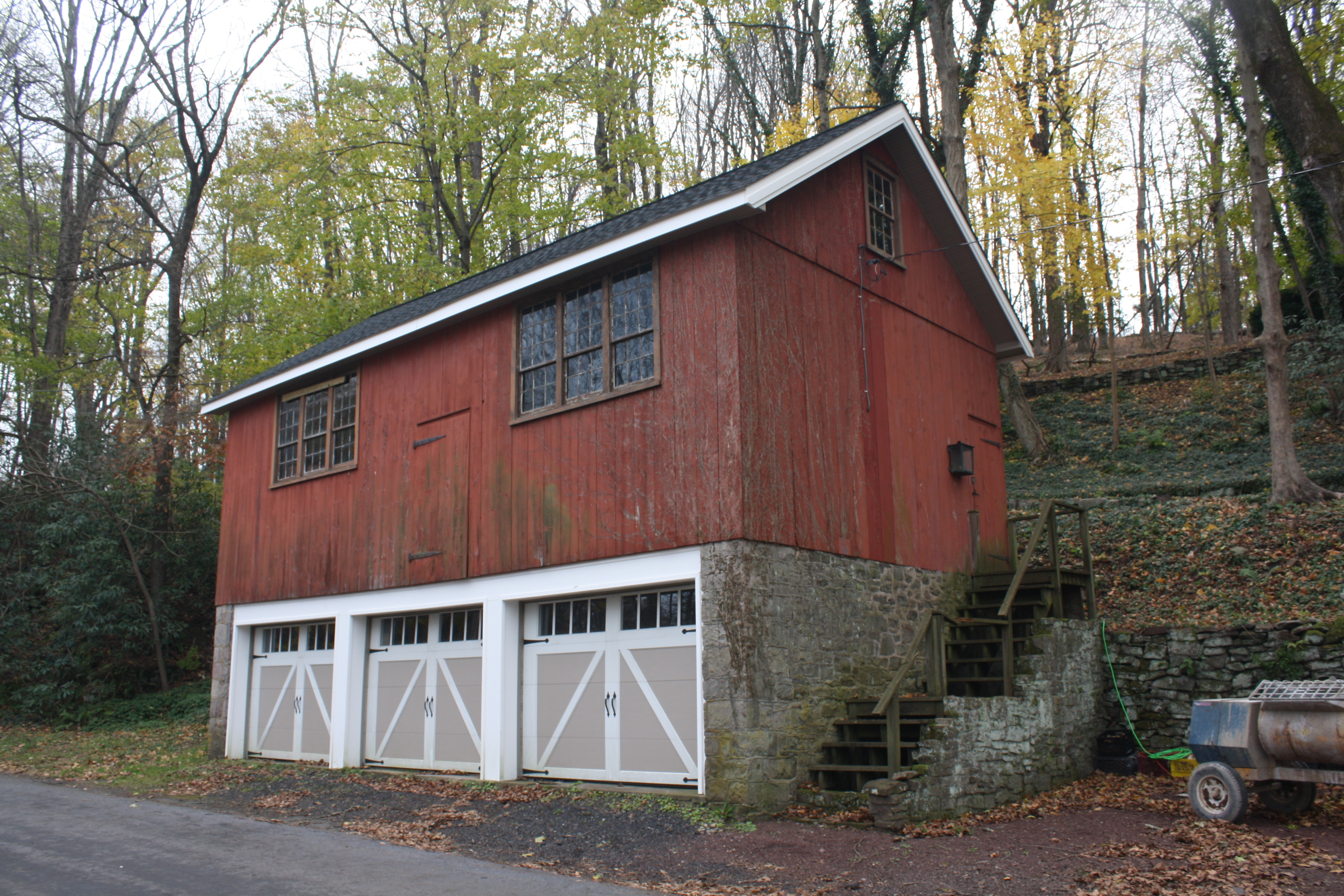
Barn on Samuel Armitage Homestead.
