= Aquetong, Pennsylvania =

Unincorporated community in Pennsylvania, US

Aquetong
- Populated place
- Aquetong, Solebury Township Aquetong (the United States)
- Coordinates: 40°21′5″N 75°0′12″W
- Country: United States
- State: Pennsylvania
- County: Bucks
- Elevation: 256 ft (78 m)
- Time zone: UTC-5 (EST)
  - Summer (DST): UTC-4 (EDT)
- ZIP code: 18938
- Area codes: 215, 267, 445

Aquetong is populated place in Solebury Township, Bucks County, Pennsylvania, United States, situated along U.S. Route 202, approximately 2.9 miles (4.7 km) west of New Hope.

== History ==
Aquetong was originally known as Paxsons Corner during the times of the American Revolution, named after the Paxson family. Benjamin Paxson, a Quaker, was the owner of a mansion known as the 'Rolling Green' and was host to officers and soldiers of the Continental army on a number of occasions. While General Washington and his army was encamped in Doylestown, General Charles Lee with six brigades were camped in a field across the road from the Rolling Green. Hershey's Directory of Bucks County of 1872 listed Aquetong as having a store, several shops and about sixteen dwellings. A post office was established on 31 March 1884, William H. Robinson, the first postmaster, at which time the name was changed to Aquetong. Sometime after 1914, the post office was closed. Mail is now delivered by the New Hope post office.

== Geography and statistics ==
It is located on U.S. Route 202 and Aquetong Road between New Hope and Lahaska. It is located in the Aquetong Creek watershed, which is part of the Delaware River watershed.

The ZIP code is 18938; telephone area codes are 215, 267 and 445. Public safety is provided by the Solebury Township Police Department, Lambertville-New Hope Rescue Squad, Central Bucks Ambulance, Eagle Fire Company, Midway Fire Company, and the Point Pleasant Fire Company.
