= Atkinson Road Bridge =

- U.S. National Register of Historic Places
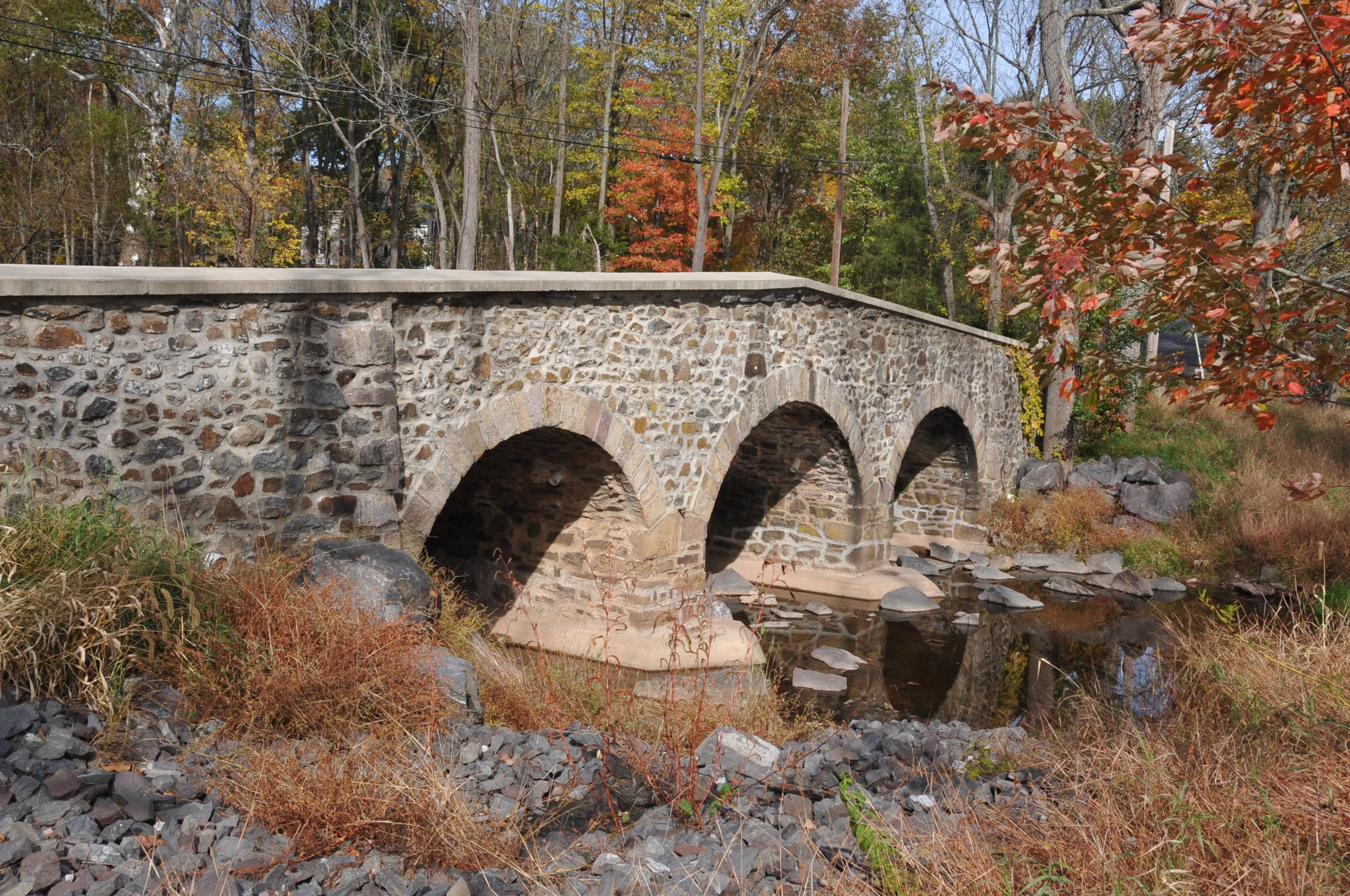
- Atkinson Road Bridge, October 2012

- Location within Pennsylvania Location within the United States
- Location: Atkinson Rd. and Pidcock's Creek, Solebury Township, Pennsylvania
- Coordinates: 40°19′38″N 74°58′44″W
- Area: less than one acre
- Built: 1873
- Built by: James Ricard; Mathew Gibney
- Architectural style: 3-arched span bridge
- NRHP reference No.: 02000222
- Added to NRHP: March 20, 2002

Atkinson Road Bridge, also known as County Bridge 305, is a historic stone arch bridge located in Solebury Township, Bucks County, Pennsylvania. It spans Pidcock's Creek. It has three spans, each approximately 20 feet long, and was constructed in 1873. It is of random rubble construction and built of native fieldstone.

It was listed on the National Register of Historic Places in 2002.
