= Rabbit Run (Delaware River tributary) =

- Rabbit Run

Location
- Country: United States
- State: Pennsylvania
- County: Bucks
- Township: Solebury

Physical characteristics
- Source
  - coordinates: 40°21′59″N 75°58′4″W
  - elevation: 340 feet (100 m)
- Mouth
  - coordinates: 40°22′31″N 74°57′24″W
  - elevation: 79 feet (24 m)
- Length: 0.29 miles (0.47 km)
- Basin size: 0.42 square miles (1.1 km^{2})

Basin features
- Progression: Rabbit Run → Delaware River → Delaware Bay
- River system: Delaware River
- Bridges: U.S. Route 202 (Lower York Road); Business Route 202 (Lower York Road); Pennsylvania Route 32 (River Road)
- Slope: 906.56 feet per mile (171.697 m/km)

Rabbit Run is a tributary of the Delaware River contained wholly within Solebury Township, Bucks County, Pennsylvania.

== Statistics ==
The Geographic Information System I.D. is 1184568. U.S. Department of the Interior Geological Survey I.D. is 03065. The watershed of Rabbit Run is 0.42 square miles (1.1 km^{2}) and it meets its confluence at the Delaware River's 149.45 river mile.

== Course ==
Rabbit Run rises in Solebury Township from two unnamed ponds adjacent to U.S. Route 202, flowing generally northeast passing through the Pat Livezey Park, meeting its confluence with the Delaware River a short distance south of the bridge carrying U.S. Route 202.

== Municipalities ==
- Bucks County
  - Solebury Township

== Crossings and bridges ==
- U.S. Route 202 (Lower York Road)
- Business Route 202 (Lower York Road)
- Pennsylvania Route 32 (River Road)
- Lower York Road (business Route 202)
- U.S. Route 202 (Lower York Road)
