= Cuttalossa, Pennsylvania =

Unincorporated hamlet in Pennsylvania, U.S.

Coordinates: 40.4082°N 75.0022°W

Cuttalossa is an unincorporated hamlet in Solebury Township, just downriver from Lumberville, Pennsylvania. It sits at the confluence of a creek that runs through an unusually beautiful small valley and that feeds into the Delaware Division of the Pennsylvania Canal, an old barge canal formerly used for transporting coal and cement from Northern Pennsylvania to Philadelphia. The canal is now the Delaware Canal State Park.

Although it is tiny, it previously had several mills along the creek including one that milled railroad ties and it also had two quarries along the canal. Cuttalosa had been the site of a ferry across the Delaware River. Later one of the stone quarries operated a cable tram to convey rock across the river to the railroad on the New Jersey side of the river.

The hamlet is also identified as Lumberton, although it was commonly called Cuttalossa after the creek that runs through it. In the past, the community had bourne the name of several of the operators of the ferry (Roses Ferry, Thorne's Ferry, Warner's Ferry, and Painter's Ferry). From 1819 until 1833 it was named Hard Times after a long standing tavern. For many years, the tavern has been a private residence and ironically, the principal mill has been a fine restaurant and bar.

Perhaps the most famous resident of the hamlet was Col. Zebulon Pike of Pike's Peak fame who spent his childhood there. Cuttalossa was also home to the artists Daniel Garber and William F. Taylor. Taylor also founded the Cuttaloosa Inn and during the late 1940s and early 1950s was one of the prime movers and shakers in saving the old barge canal and having it restored and refilled.
