= Highton, Pennsylvania =

Unincorporated community in Pennsylvania, US

- Populated place
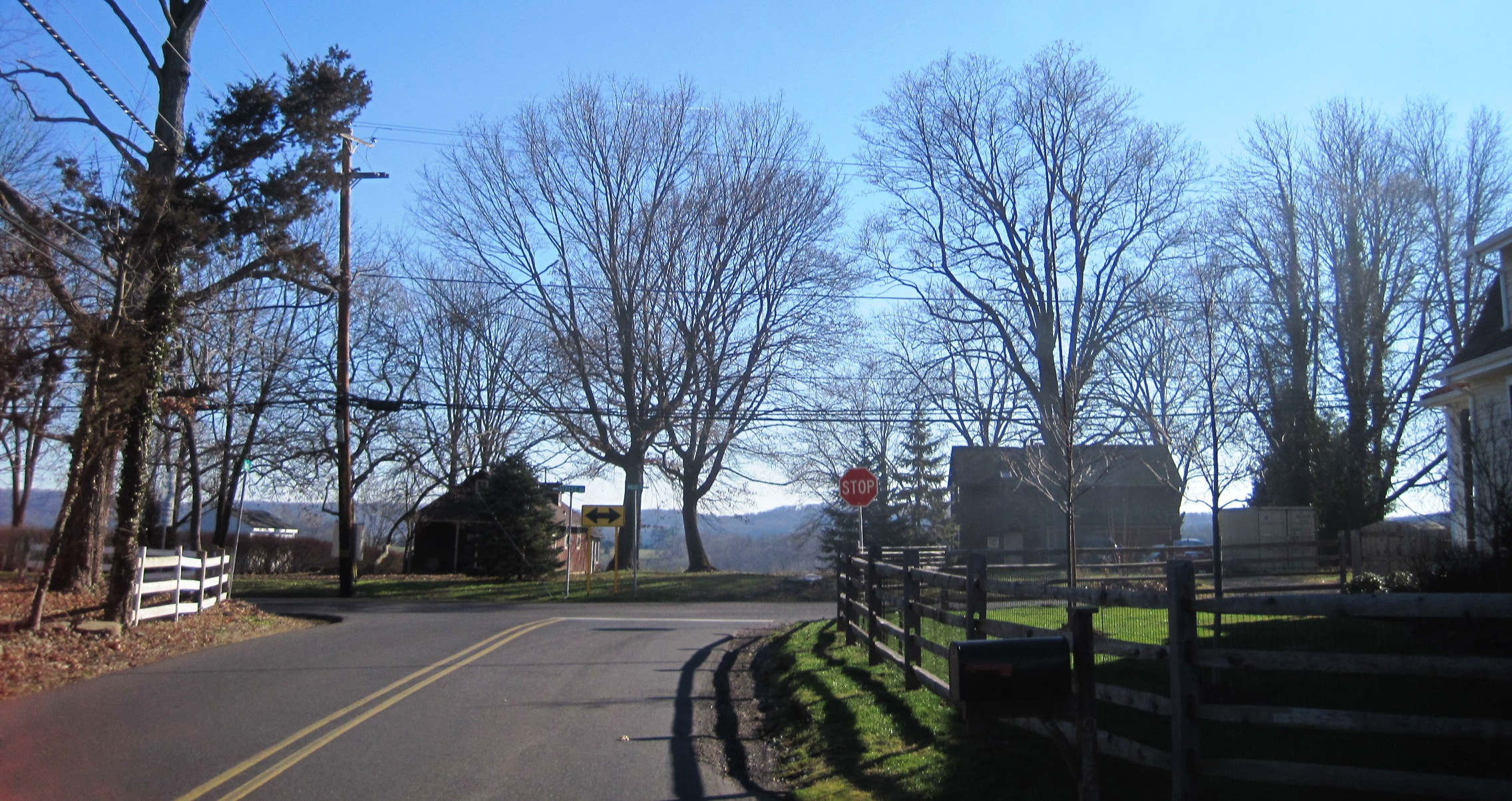
- At the intersection of Street Road and Ridge Road

- Location of Highton in Pennsylvania Highton, Pennsylvania (the United States)
- Coordinates: 40°19′20″N 74°59′19″W
- Country: United States
- State: Pennsylvania
- County: Bucks
- Township: Buckingham, Solebury
- Elevation: 220 ft (67 m)
- Time zone: UTC-5 (Eastern (EST))
  - Summer (DST): UTC-4 (EDT)
- Area code: 215
- FIPS code: 42-34668
- GNIS feature ID: 1203806

Highton is a populated place situated along the border of Buckingham and Solebury townships in Bucks County, Pennsylvania, United States.

== Geography ==
The small settlement is located along Street Road (which runs along the township line) at its intersection with Ridge Road. As the latter road's name implies, it is located along a ridge (at an estimated elevation of 220 feet (67 m) above sea level) between Pidcock Creek and Curls Run, approximately three and a half miles (5.6 km) southeast of New Hope.

There are a few houses located around the settlement; the remainder consists of farms and properties containing large houses over rolling terrain.
