= Jay Schulberg =

American advertising executive

Jay William Schulberg (July 17, 1939 – January 12, 2005) was an American advertising executive who had chief creative positions at both Ogilvy & Mather and Bozell Worldwide, with an approach to developing concise ads with memorable taglines. He was responsible for creating many notable advertising campaigns including the Got Milk? milk mustache campaign, the "Excedrin Headache" that could only be cured by the "extra-strength pain reliever", and the American Express" Don't Leave Home Without It" campaign with Karl Malden as spokesman.

== Biography ==
Born in Manhattan Schulberg attended New York University from which he graduated in 1961. He had originally planned to pursue a career as a screenwriter, following in the path of his cousin Budd Schulberg who had written the Academy Award-winning screenplay for On the Waterfront.

=== Advertising ===
He was hired by Ogilvy & Mather in 1961 as a junior copywriter. In the 1970s, he used Karl Malden then starring in the police drama The Streets of San Francisco, to deliver the line "Don't Leave Home Without It" to emphasize the safety of American Express traveler's checks. "A dry baby is a happy baby" was a line developed for Huggies diapers, used in ads with happy infants.

Other campaigns pitched the "extra-strength pain reliever" as the cure for an "Excedrin headache" and used an older actor to introduce consumers to the "good old-fashioned lemonade" flavor of Country Time lemonade. Other clients at Ogilvy & Mather included AT&T, Duracell, Hershey's, Maxwell House, and Sports Illustrated.

He was hired by Bozell in November 1987 as executive vice president, creative director. He developed a campaign for the National Milk Processors Board in 1994, featuring celebrities drinking milk, as part of an effort to increase milk consumption. The campaign, created by art director Bernie Hogya and copywriter Jennifer Gold, featured celebrity photographs by Annie Leibovitz of notables such as Lauren Bacall and Naomi Campbell with a milk mustache and the tagline "Milk. What a surprise!" The program next included men as well as women with milk above their lips, and the slogan "Where's your mustache?" and later, "Got milk?". Schulberg recounted his experiences in the 1998 New York Times best-seller The Milk Mustache Book, co-written with Bernie Hogya and Sal Taibi.

After retiring in 1999, he worked as creative director of a $10 million public service campaign initiated in 2001 that promoted values such as determination, perseverance and selflessness, featuring everyday people as "the heroes all around us, whose stories are rarely told".

=== Personal ===
A longtime resident of Solebury Township, Pennsylvania, Schulberg died at age 65 in Doylestown, Pennsylvania on January 12, 2005 due to pancreatic cancer. He was survived by his wife, Kathryn.
