= Cuttalosa Creek (Delaware River tributary) =

- Cuttalosa Creek
- Native name: Quatalossi (Unami)

Location
- Country: United States
- State: Pennsylvania
- County: Bucks
- Township: Solebury

Physical characteristics
- Source
  - coordinates: 40°22′13″N 75°1′20″W
  - elevation: 410 feet (120 m)
- Mouth
  - coordinates: 40°24′9″N 75°2′12″W
  - elevation: 70 feet (21 m)

Basin features
- Progression: Cuttalosa Creek → Delaware River → Delaware Bay
- River system: Delaware River
- Bridges: Aquetong Road; Greenhill Road; Creamery Road; North Sugan Road; Cuttalosa Road (five crossings); Pennsylvania Route 32 (River Road)

Cuttalosa Creek is a tributary of the Delaware River in Bucks County, Pennsylvania.

== Course ==
Cuttalosa Creek rises from two springs just over a mile to the west of the village of Solebury in Solebury Township at an elevation of 410 feet (120 m) and is oriented to the northeast, then turns north, then northeast, then north until it reaches its confluence with the Delaware at Cuttalossa (Lumberton) about a mile upstream of Hendricks Island at an elevation of 70 feet (21 m). Cuttalosa Road crosses over the stream five times.

== Etymology ==
The name Cuttalosa was derived from the Lenape name Quatalossi for their village nearby.

== Geology ==
Cuttalosa Creek lies on the Stockton Formation, a layer of bedrock consisting of light-gray to light brown sandstone, siltstone, and mudstone, laid down in the Late Triassic.

== History ==
At one time, the Lenape occupied a village in the valley. Later, there were several mills along the creek. One was built by Samuel Armitage in 1752 which operated until his descendant, Amos Armitage, closed the mill in 1929.

== Municipalities ==
- Bucks County
  - Solebury Township

== Crossings and Bridges ==
Crossing	NBI Number	Length	Lanes	Spans	Material/Design	Built	Reconstructed	Latitude	Longitude
Aquetong Road	-	-	-	-	-	-	-	-	-
Greenhill Road	-	-	-	-	-	-	-	-	-
Creamery Road	-	-	-	-	-	-	-	-	-
North Sugan Road	-	-	-	-	-	-	-	-	-
Cuttalosa Road	-	-	-	-	-	-	-	-	-
Cuttalosa Road	-	-	-	-	-	-	-	-	-
Cuttalosa Road	7539	23 feet (7.0 m)	-	-	continuous concrete stringer/multi-beam or girder with concrete cast-in-place deck and bituminous surface	1932	-	40°23'49"N	75°1'13"W
Cuttalosa Road	7538	26.9 feet (8.2 m)	-	-	continuous concrete stringer/multi-beam girder with concrete cast-in-place deck and bituminous surface	1932	-	40°23'52"N	75°1'10"W
Cuttalosa Road	-	-	-	-	-	-	-	-	-

== See also ==
- List of rivers of the United States
- List of rivers of Pennsylvania
- List of Delaware River tributaries
