= Dark Hollow Run (Delaware River tributary) =

- Dark Hollow Run

Location
- Country: United States
- State: Pennsylvania
- County: Bucks
- Township: Solebury

Physical characteristics
- Source
  - coordinates: 40°20′29″N 74°58′4″W
  - elevation: 300 feet (91 m)
- Mouth
  - coordinates: 40°21′27″N 74°56′57″W
  - elevation: 62 feet (19 m)
- Length: 1.54 miles (2.48 km)
- Basin size: 71 square miles (180 km^{2})

Basin features
- Progression: Dark Hollow Run → Delaware River → Delaware Bay
- River system: Delaware River
- Bridges: Aquetong Road; South Sugan Road; Pennsylvania Route 32 (River Road)
- Slope: 154.55 feet per mile (29.271 m/km)

Dark Hollow Run is a tributary of the Delaware River contained wholly within Solebury Township, Bucks County, Pennsylvania, meeting with the Delaware south of New Hope.

== History ==
A branch line of the Postal Telegraph Company was connected with the main line from Trenton, NJ, in the summer of 1888.

== Statistics ==
The Geographic Name Information System I.D. is 1172941, U.S. Department of the Interior Geological Survey I.D. is 03034.

== Course ==
Dark Hollow Run rises south of Aquetong Road at an elevation of 300 feet (91 m) and runs for about a mile and a half to its confluence with the Delaware River at the river's 148.20 River Mile at an elevation of 62 feet (19 m), resulting in an average slope of 154.55 feet per mile (29.271 m/km).

== Municipalities ==
- Bucks County
  - Solebury Township

== Crossings and bridges ==
- Pennsylvania Route 32 (River Road)-NBI structure number 6792, bridge is 8 metres (26 ft) long concrete Tee Beam constructed 1959.
- South Sugan Road
- Aquetong Road
