= Van Sandt Covered Bridge =

- U.S. National Register of Historic Places
- Van Sandt Covered Bridge in 2026

- Location within Pennsylvania Location within the United States
- Location: Solebury Township, Bucks County, Pennsylvania
- Coordinates: 40°19′37″N 74°57′29″W
- Built: 1875
- MPS: Covered Bridges of the Delaware River Watershed TR
- NRHP reference No.: 80003438
- Added to NRHP: December 1, 1980

The Van Sandt Covered Bridge (or Van Sant Covered Bridge), also known as the Beaver Dam Bridge, is a historic covered bridge located in Solebury Township, near New Hope in Bucks County, Pennsylvania. Built in 1875, the 86 foot, town truss span crosses the Pidcock Creek near Washington Crossing Historic Park.

It was added to the National Register of Historic Places on December 1, 1980.

Locals consider this bridge a Crybaby Bridge.
