= Daniel Garber =

American painter

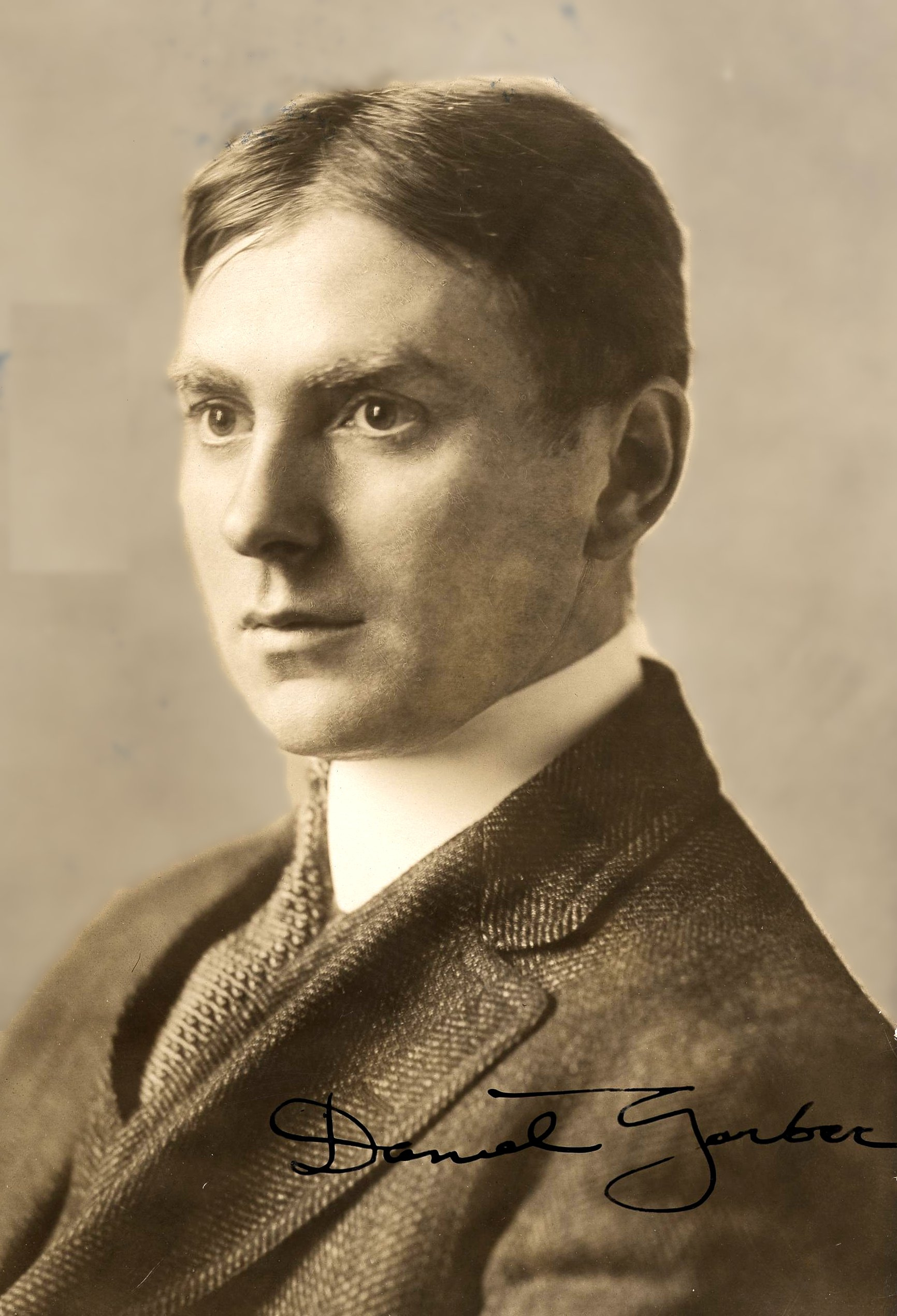
- circa 1900
- Born: April 11, 1880; North Manchester, Indiana
- Died: July 5, 1958 (aged 78); Cuttalossa, Pennsylvania
- Education: Pennsylvania Academy of the Fine Arts
- Known for: landscape painter

Daniel Garber (April 11, 1880 – July 5, 1958) was an American Impressionist landscape painter and member of the art colony at New Hope, Pennsylvania. He is best known today for his large impressionist scenes of the New Hope area, in which he often depicted the Delaware River. He also painted figurative interior works and excelled at etching. In addition to his painting career, Garber taught art at the Pennsylvania Academy of the Fine Arts for over forty years.

== Life ==
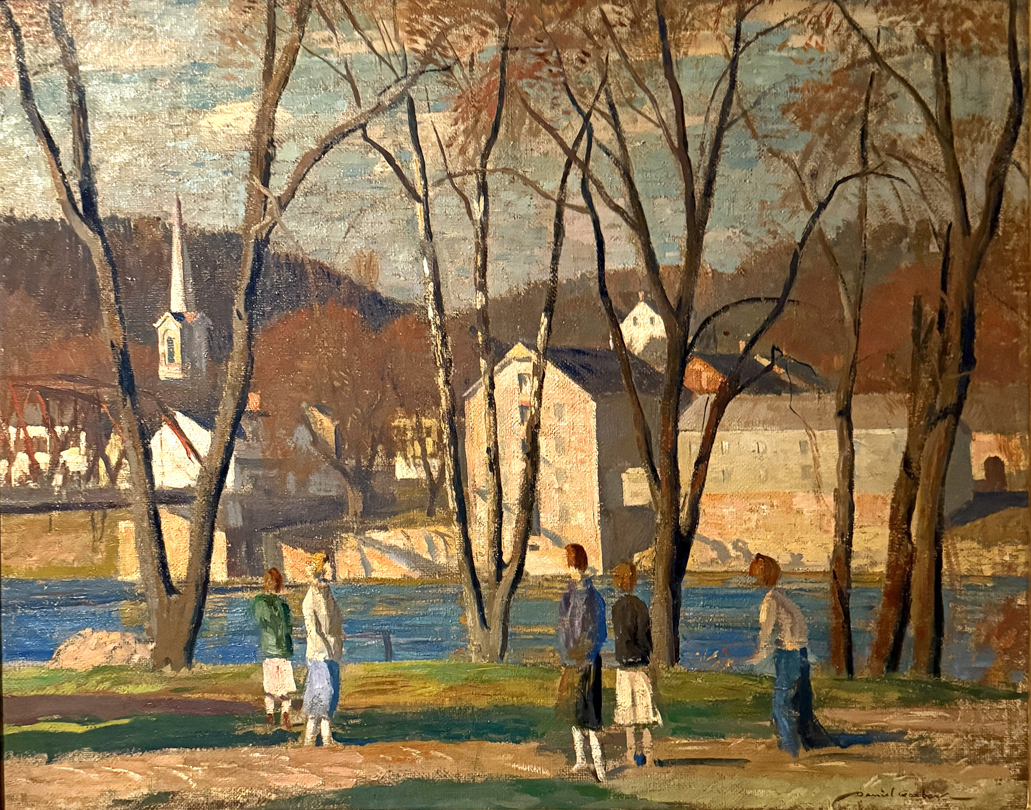
"School Days" by Daniel Garber, 1938, Oil on Canvas, 22" x 26," in a Bernard Badura frame.

Garber was born on April 11, 1880, in North Manchester, Indiana. He studied art at the Art Academy of Cincinnati, and at the Pennsylvania Academy of the Fine Arts in Philadelphia from 1899 to 1905. During this time Garber met and married his wife, Mary Franklin, who was also an art student. In the tradition of many American artists, Garber and his wife traveled to Europe to complete his art education. Returning to America in 1907, on the advice of artist William Langson Lathrop he settled at Cuttalossa (Solebury Township, Bucks County) just downriver from Lumberville, Pennsylvania, six miles up the Delaware River from New Hope.

Like most impressionist painters, Garber painted landscapes en plein air, directly from nature. He exhibited his works nationwide and earned numerous awards, including a gold medal at the Panama-Pacific International Exposition (1915) in San Francisco, California. He was elected a member of the National Academy of Design in 1913. Garber died on July 5, 1958, after falling from a ladder at his studio. Today, Garber's paintings are considered by collectors and art historians to be among the finest works produced from the New Hope art colony. His paintings are owned by major museums including the Smithsonian American Art Museum in Washington, DC, the Art Institute of Chicago and Philadelphia Museum of Art. One of Garber's students was artist Delle Miller.
