= Pidcock Creek =

- Van Sandt Covered Bridge on Pidcock Creek

- Pidcock Creek

Location
- Country: United States
- State: Pennsylvania
- County: Bucks
- Township: Buckingham; Upper Makefield; Solebury

Physical characteristics
- Source
  - coordinates: 40°18′35″N 75°1′57″W
  - elevation: 230 feet (70 m)
- Mouth
  - coordinates: 40°19′56″N 74°56′5″W
  - elevation: 49 feet (15 m)
- Length: 6.73 miles (10.83 km)
- Basin size: 12.70 square miles (32.9 km^{2})

Basin features
- Progression: Pidcock Creek → Delaware River → Delaware Bay
- River system: Delaware River
- Tributaries
  - right: Curls Run
- Bridges: Holicong Road; Pineville Road; Street Road; Pidcock Creek Road; Atkinson Road (Creek Road); Pennsylvania Route 232 (Windy Bush Road); Covered Bridge Road (Van Sandt Covered Bridge); Bowmans Hill Tower Road; Pennsylvania Route 32 (River Road); Pennsylvania Canal (Delaware Division) and towpath
- Slope: 26.89 feet per mile (5.093 m/km)

Pidcock Creek is a tributary of the Delaware River in Bucks County, Pennsylvania. Rising in Buckingham Township, it flows into the Delaware in Solebury Township after a short side trip within Upper Makefield Township.

== History ==
Pidcock Creek was named for John Pidcock, early settler, occupying in 1698, and purchasing on 31 May 1701 from Gilbert Wheeler, the tract later known as the Thompson-Neely tract. The tract also included an old Lenape village called Win-na-haw-caw-chunk in the Wheeler and Pidcock deeds.

== Statistics ==
Pidcock Creek was added to the Geographic Names Information System of the U.S. Geological Survey on 2 August 1979 as identification number 1183702. U.S. Department of the Interior Geological Survey I.D. is 03002. It has a drainage basin of 12.70 square miles (32.9 km^{2}).

== Course ==
Pidcock Creek rises in Buckingham Township from an unnamed pond and quickly receives two tributaries, one from the left and one from the right. Flowing into Solebury Township, it eventually turn to the southeast where it receives Curls Run from the right. Then it makes a short jaunt into Upper Makefield Township where it picks up another tributary from the right and returns to Solebury after which it turn eastward, then makes an "S" bend where it receives another tributary from the right then it meets its confluence at the Delaware's 146.30 river mile.

== Tributaries ==
- Curls Run

== Municipalities ==
- Bucks County
  - Solebury Township
  - Upper Makefield Township
  - Buckingham Township

== Crossings and bridges ==
- Pennsylvania Canal (Delaware Division)
- Pennsylvania Route 32 (River Road) - NBI structure number 6791, bridge is 48 metres (157 ft) long, 2 lane, 2 spans, masonry arch-deck, built 1935.
- Bowmans Hill Tower Road
- Covered Bridge Road (Van Sandt Covered Bridge) - NBI structure number 7536, bridge is 26 metres (85 ft) long, single lane, single lane, wood or timber truss - thru, reconstructed 2008. Van Sandt Covered Bridge is number 80003438 on the National Register of Historic Places.
- Pennsylvania Route 232 (Windy Bush Road) - NBI structure number 6958, bridge is 15 metres (49 ft) long, 2 lane, single span, concrete tee beam, built 1930, reconstructed 2011.
- Atkinson Road (Creek Road) - NBI structure number 7525, bridge is 15 metres (49 ft) long, single lane, 3 spans, masonry arch-deck, reconstructed 2006.
- Pidcock Creek Road
- Street Road - NBI structure number 7542, bridge is 8 metres (26 ft) long, 2 lane, single span, steel stringer/multi-beam or girder, steel deck, built 1954, reconstructed 2013.
- Pineville Road - NBI structure number 47909, bridge is 46.9 feet (14.3 m) long, concrete tee-beam, concrete cast-in-place deck, built 1954, reconstructed 2013.
- Holicong Road

== See also ==
- List of rivers of Pennsylvania
- List of rivers of the United States
- List of Delaware River tributaries
