= Honey Hollow Watershed =

- U.S. National Register of Historic Places
- U.S. National Historic Landmark District
- Pennsylvania state historical marker
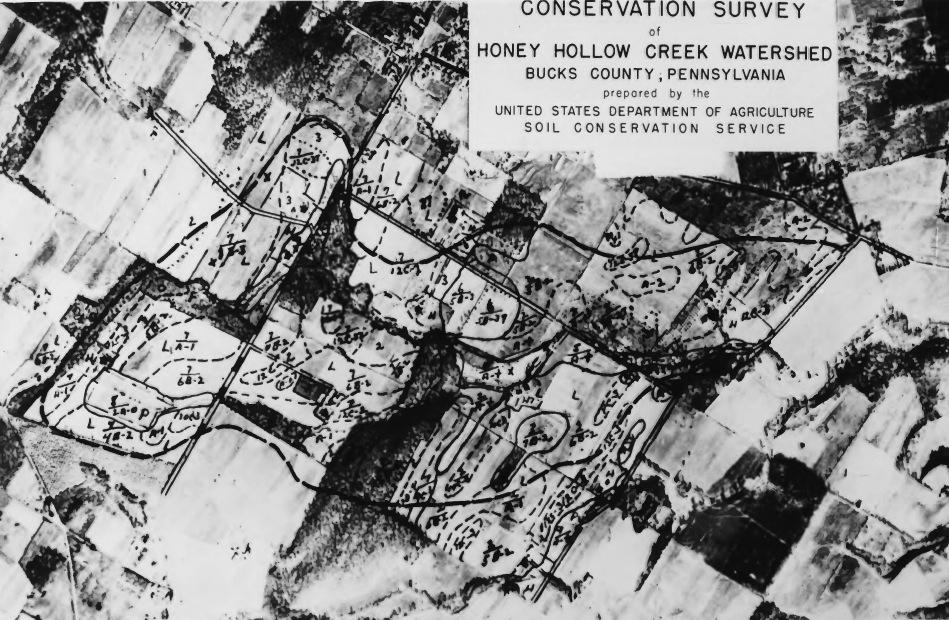

- Location within Pennsylvania Location within the United States
- Nearest city: New Hope, Pennsylvania
- Coordinates: 40°22′26″N 75°0′27″W
- Area: 650 acres (260 ha)
- Built: 1933
- Architect: Soil Conservation Service
- NRHP reference No.: 69000155

Significant dates
- Added to NRHP: August 4, 1969
- Designated NHLD: August 4, 1969
- Designated PHMC: September 20, 1997

The Honey Hollow Watershed is a 650-acre (2.6 km^{2}) watershed on the south side of the Delaware River a few miles north of New Hope, Pennsylvania. It is the site of the first privately owned soil conservation district in the United States. Created by five landowners in 1933, it was successful in mitigating the effects of erosion caused by the introduction of modern agricultural methods in the early 20th century. The area was designated a National Historic Landmark District in 1969.

== The project ==
The Honey Hollow Watershed is located in Solebury Township, in a rural area west of the town of New Hope. It is bounded on the northeast by Sugan Road, and is roughly bisected by Creamery Road, with its western and southern bounds defined by the ridgeline that separates Honey Hollow from an adjacent watershed. To the northwest it is also bounded by a ridge that runs parallel to and northwest of Upper York Road. The area historically consisted of five farms totaling about 650 acres. The landscape of the farmland in this area retains features established in the 1930s, including contour-plowed fields, terracing, and water runoff diversion ditches.

The watershed area has a long history of agricultural use, dating to the mid-18th century. Mechanized methods of cultivation and field management were widely introduced in the years after World War I, here and elsewhere in the country, which resulted in a significant amount of soil loss due to erosion, and siltation of water bodies downstream. Although the federal government was aware of the problem in the late 1920s, and began applying conservation methods to government-owned lands in 1933, the legality of imposing such methods on the (in aggregate) much larger private landholdings in the nation was still a subject of debate. The five farmers who owned the properties in Honey Hollow, whose lands were suffering from these problems, decided to band together to address what was a shared problem.

Established with the help of the Soil Conservation Service in Upper Darby Township, Pennsylvania, the project became a model of cooperative conservation efforts. By 1941 terraces and diversion ditches were built to control runoff on steep slopes and hedges were planted to control erosion. The project attracted national attention when Vice President Henry Wallace visited the first time in 1944. Conservationist Louis Bromfield also became associated with the project. P. Alston Waring, one of six farmers involved in the project, wrote about the project in the United States Department of Agriculture publication "Team Work to Save Soil and Increase Production." and in the magazine "The Land."

The watershed was declared a National Historic Landmark in 1969.

== Gallery ==
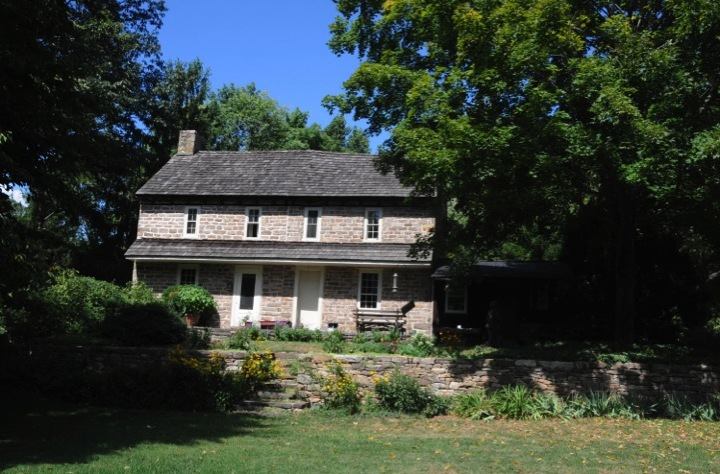

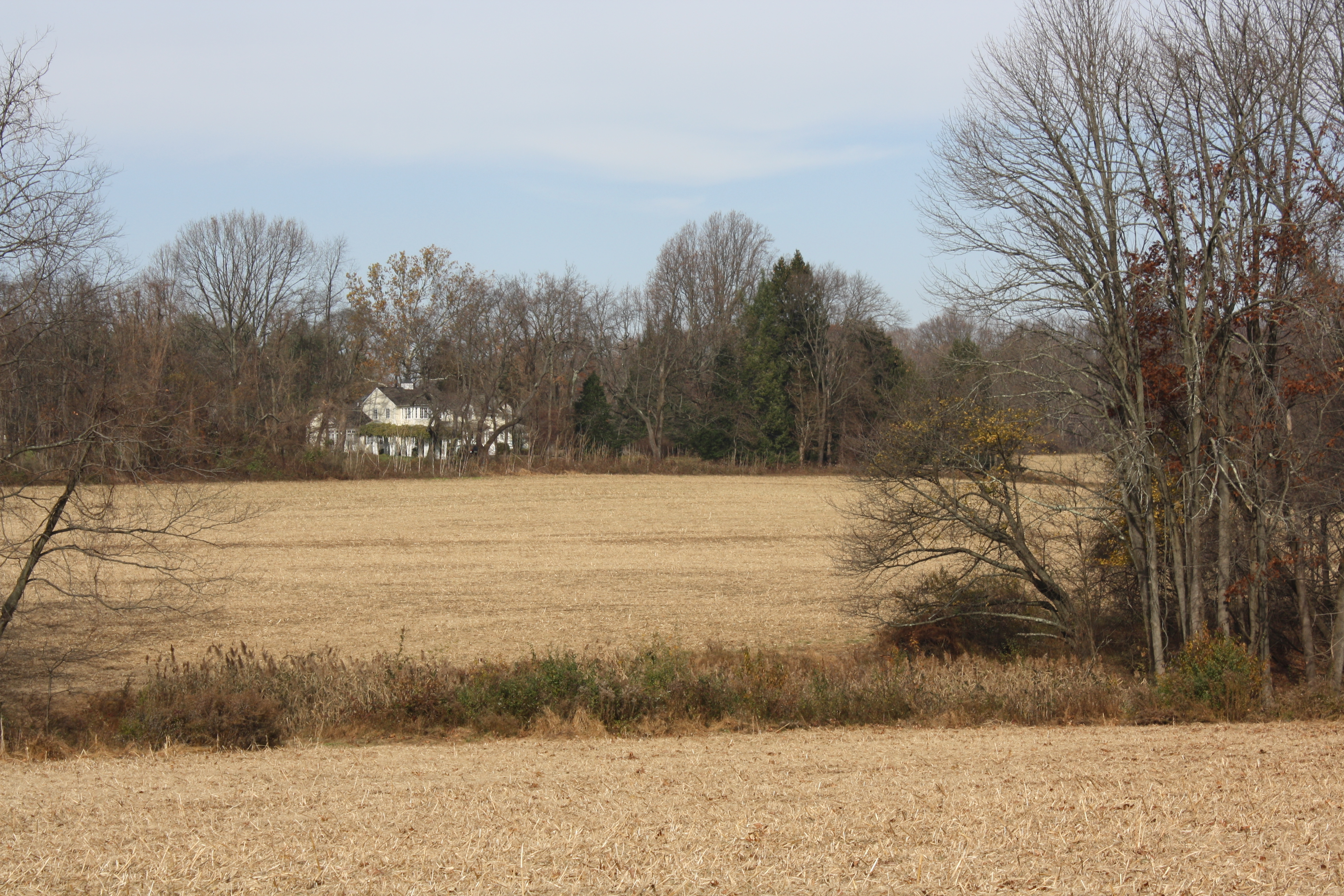

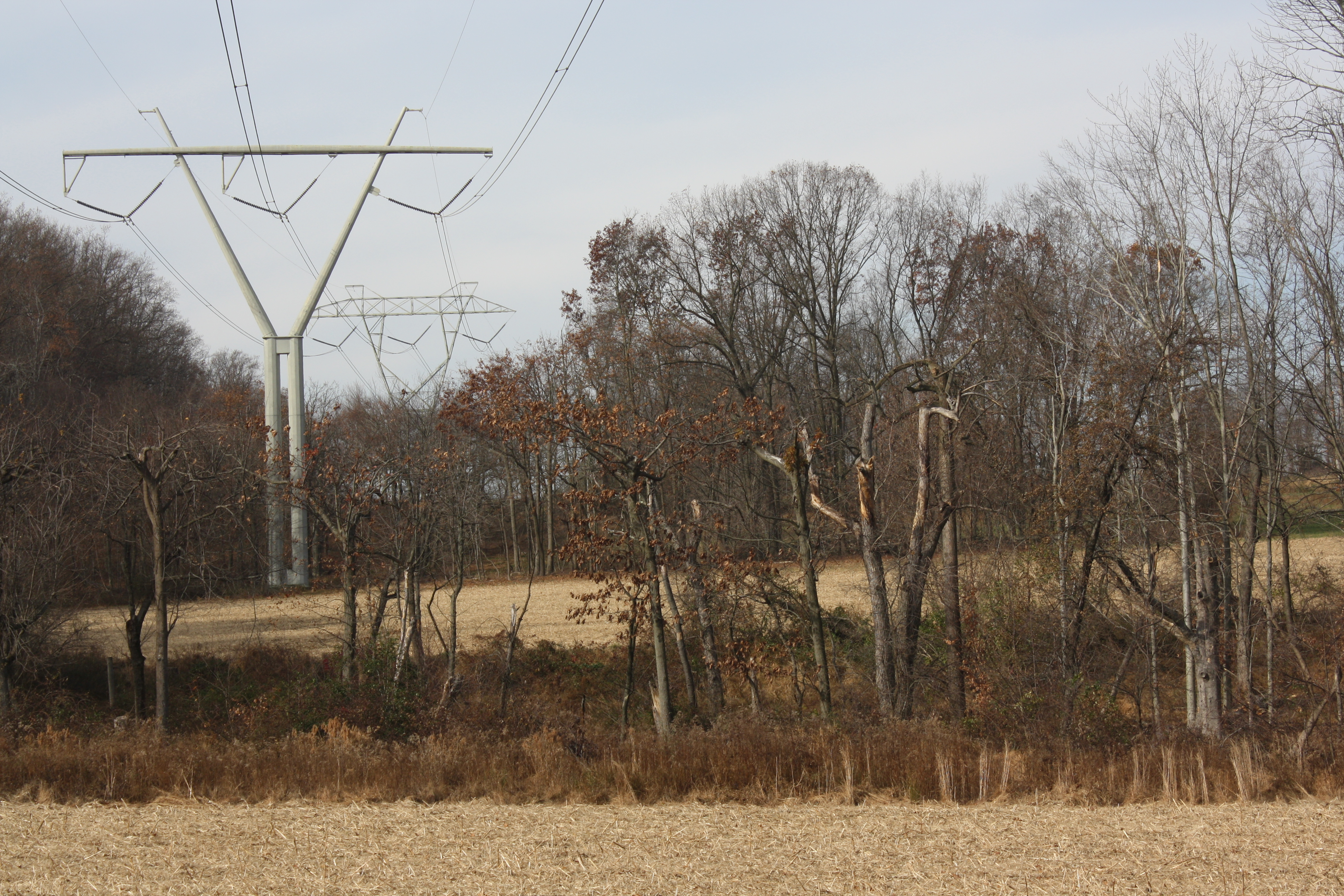

== See also ==
- List of National Historic Landmarks in Pennsylvania
- National Register of Historic Places listings in Bucks County, Pennsylvania
