= Isaiah Paxson Farm =

- U.S. National Register of Historic Places
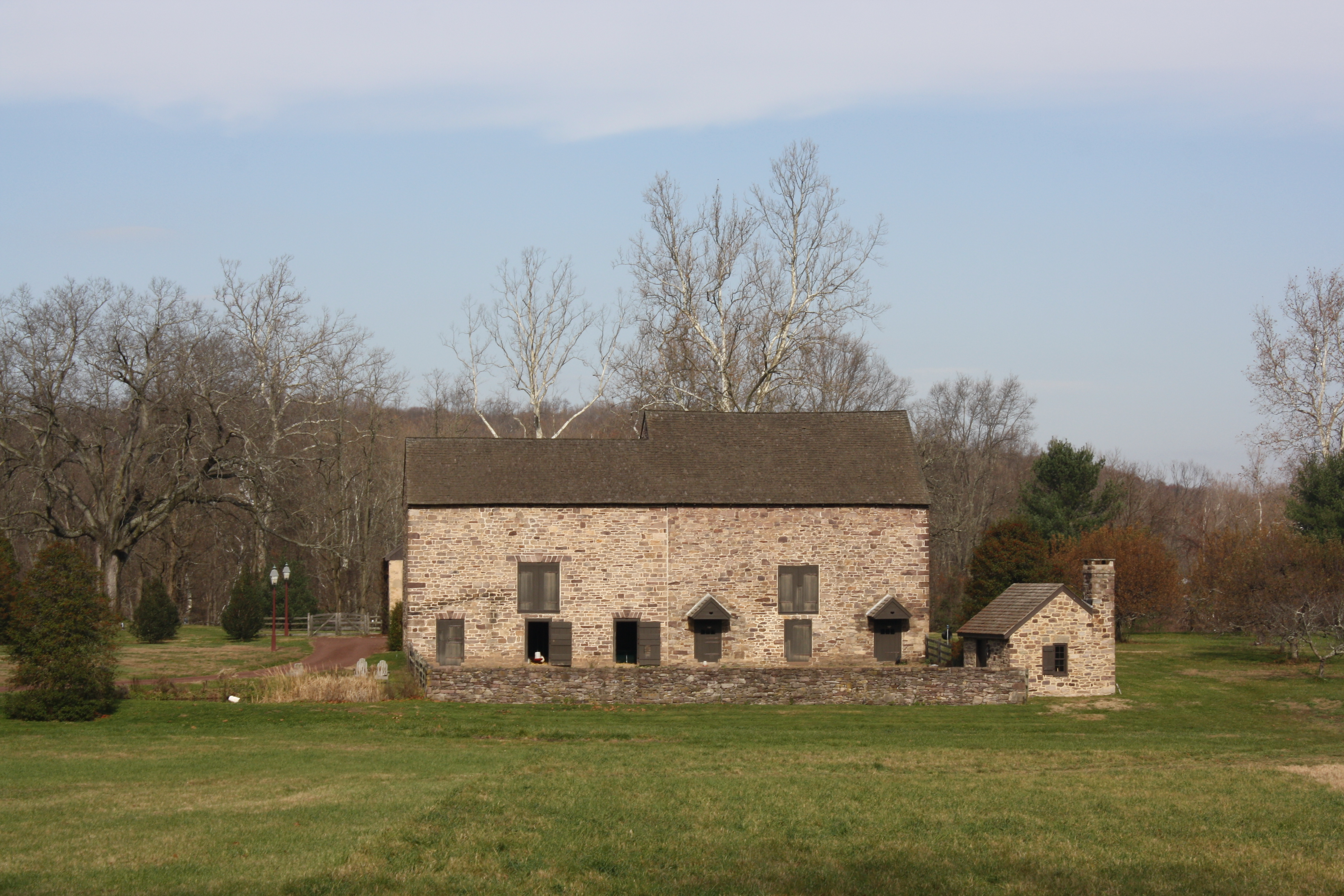
- Burgess Lea Farm. Barn. November 2012.

- Location within Pennsylvania Location within the United States
- Location: Along River Road across from its junction with Laurel Road, Solebury Township, Pennsylvania
- Coordinates: 40°24′14″N 74°59′22″W
- Area: 39.8 acres (16.1 ha)
- Built: 1785
- Architectural style: Georgian
- NRHP reference No.: 84003167
- Added to NRHP: August 23, 1984

The Isaiah Paxson Farm, also known as Burgess Lea, is an historic farm complex which is located in Solebury Township, Bucks County, Pennsylvania.

It was added to the National Register of Historic Places in 1984.

== History and architectural features ==
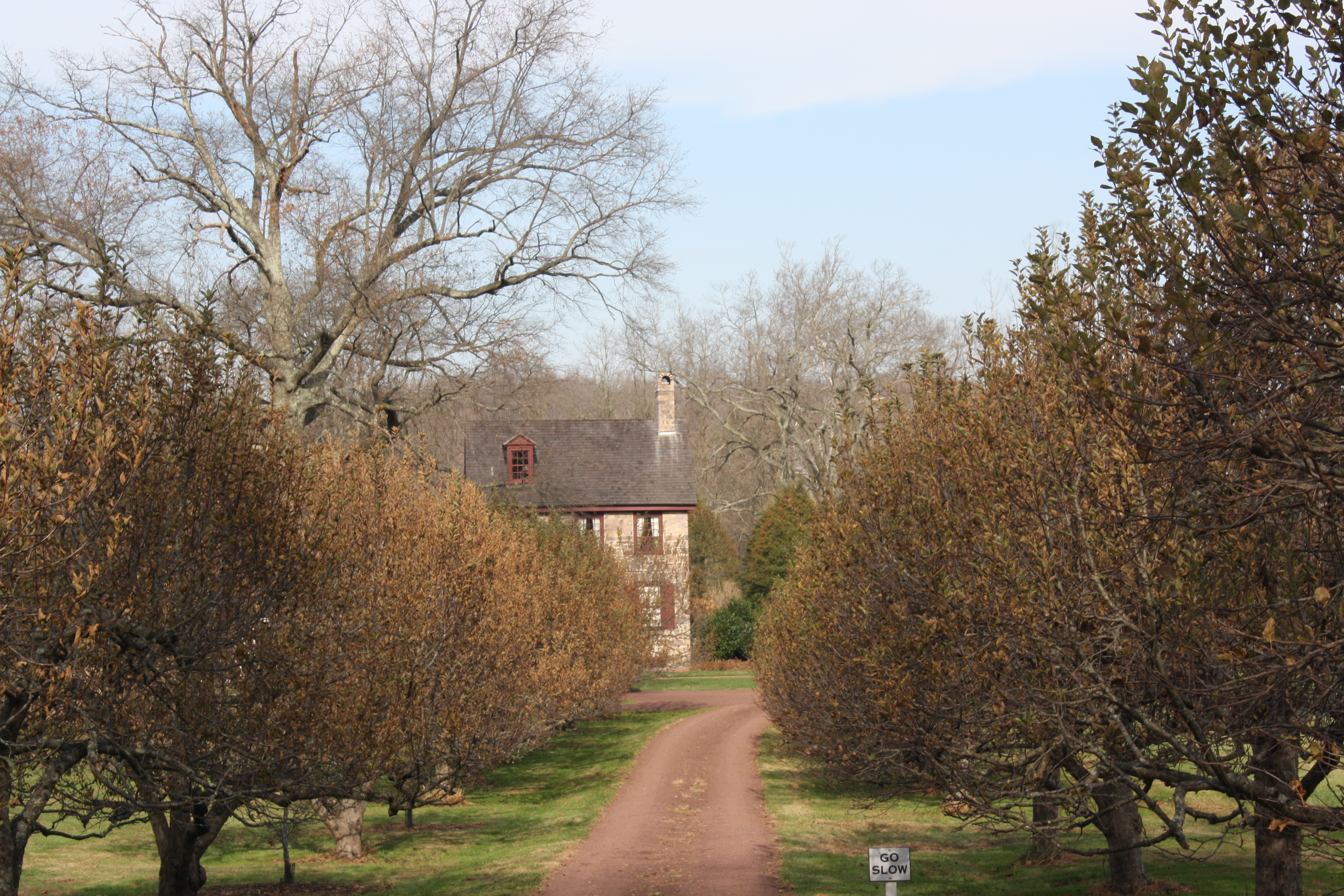
Alley and Main Building.

The complex consists of a house, double barn, carriage house, springhouse, shed, smoke house, and small barnyard building. All of the buildings were constructed of stone. The house was built in 1785, and has a 2 1/2-story, three-bay, gable-roofed, main section with a 2 1/2-story kitchen section and one-story shed addition. It was designed in the Georgian style.

It was added to the National Register of Historic Places in 1984.
