= Aquetong Creek (Delaware River tributary) =

Aquetong Creek Great Spring Creek
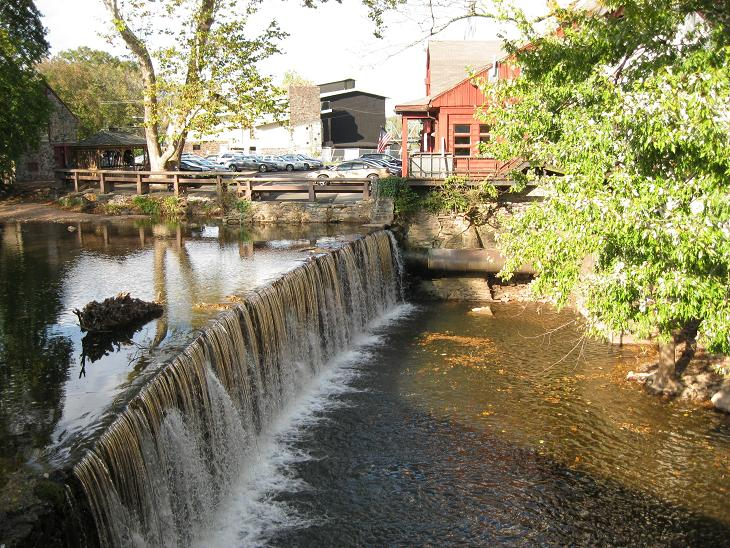
- The falls and millpond at Aquetong Creek in New Hope, Pennsylvania.

- Aquetong Creek

Location
- Country: United States
- State: Pennsylvania
- County: Bucks
- Township: Solebury
- Borough: New Hope

Physical characteristics
- Source
  - coordinates: 40°20′34″N 75°0′26″W
  - elevation: 180 feet (55 m)
- Mouth: Delaware River
  - coordinates: 40°21′43″N 74°56′59″W
  - elevation: 49 feet (15 m)
- Length: 2.52 miles (4.06 km)

Basin features
- River system: Delaware River
- Bridges: South Sugan Road; West Mechanic Street; Stockton Avenue; Pennsylvania Route 32 (River Road)
- Slope: 51.98 feet per mile (9.845 m/km)

Aquetong Creek is a tributary of the Delaware River in Solebury Township and New Hope, Bucks County, Pennsylvania. Rising from the Aquetong Spring, formerly known as Ingham Spring, just south of the intersection of U.S. Route 202, Lower Mountain Road, and Ingham Road, it runs about 10.75 miles (17.30 km) to its confluence with the Delaware.

== History ==
The area surrounding Aquetong Creek was occupied by the Lenape people until the lower portion of what is now Bucks County was acquired by the Penn colony. The Lenape called the spring "Achewetong" or "Achewetank" meaning "at the spring among the bushes". A Lenape village was located at the spring up until about 1690. On 1 November 1710, James Logan, secretary to Penn and later mayor of Philadelphia, was granted 600 acres (240 hectares) of land including the area of the spring. In 1707, Robert and Richard Heath built a gristmill along the Aquetong and on 2 November 1710, Richard was granted 1,000 acres (400 hectares) of land from the confluence of the Aquetong to the Delaware to include the lower Aquetong valley and the mill. A fulling mill was constructed as early as 1712 by Phillip Williams. The first sawmill on the Aquetong appeared in 1740. In 1747 Jonathan Ingham purchased the Logan tract and constructed a fulling mill below the spring, who passed it on to his son, Dr. Jonathan Ingham, who passed it on to his son, Samuel D. Ingham, famous as President Jackson's Secretary of the Treasury, who took possession in 1800. Later, Samuel likely abandoned the fuller mill and built the Ingham Springs Paper Mill, operating until his passing in 1860. Aquetong Spring, as it was known by the Lenape, later known as Ingham Spring or the Great Spring, was said to have flowed as much as 3 million gallons per day. The spring flowed a short distance to a dam constructed in 1870 to produce Aquetong Lake or Pond, then flowed in Aquetong Creek generally eastward to the Delaware River in New Hope, PA. The dam has been recently removed to return the pond to its original pre-dam condition.

== Statistics ==
The drainage basin of Aquetong Creek covers about 8.01 square miles (20.7 km^{2}) in Solebury Township and the Borough of New Hope. The Geographic Names Information System I.D. number is 1168359 , the U.S. Department of the Interior Geological Survey I.D. is 03039.

== Course ==
Aquetong Creek rises from Aquetong Spring near U.S. Route 202 and Lower Mountain in Solebury Township at an elevation of 180 feet (55 m) and flows in a generally eastward direction, receiving one tributary from the left bank, to its confluence with the Delaware at its 148.5 river mile at an elevation of 49 feet (15 m), resulting in an average slope of 51.98 feet per mile (9.845 m/km).

== Municipalities ==
- Bucks County
  - Solebury Township
  - New Hope

== Crossings and bridges ==
- Pennsylvania Route 32 (South Main Street) - NBI structure number 6794, bridge is 52 metres (171 ft) long, continuous concrete Tee Beam, 3 spans, 2 lanes, constructed 1959.
- Stockton Avenue – NBI structure number 7478, bridge is 79 metres (259 ft) long, concrete arch deck, 32 spans, 2 lanes, constructed 1910, reconstructed 1974.
- West Mechanic Street – NBI structure number 48827, bridge is 10 metres (33 ft), steel Stringer/Multi-beam or Girder, single span, single lane, constructed 1960.
- South Sugan Road – NBI structure number 7352, bridge is 15 metres (49 ft)long, Prestressed concrete, Box Beam or Girders-single or spread, single span, 2 lanes, constructed 1973.
- Reeder Road

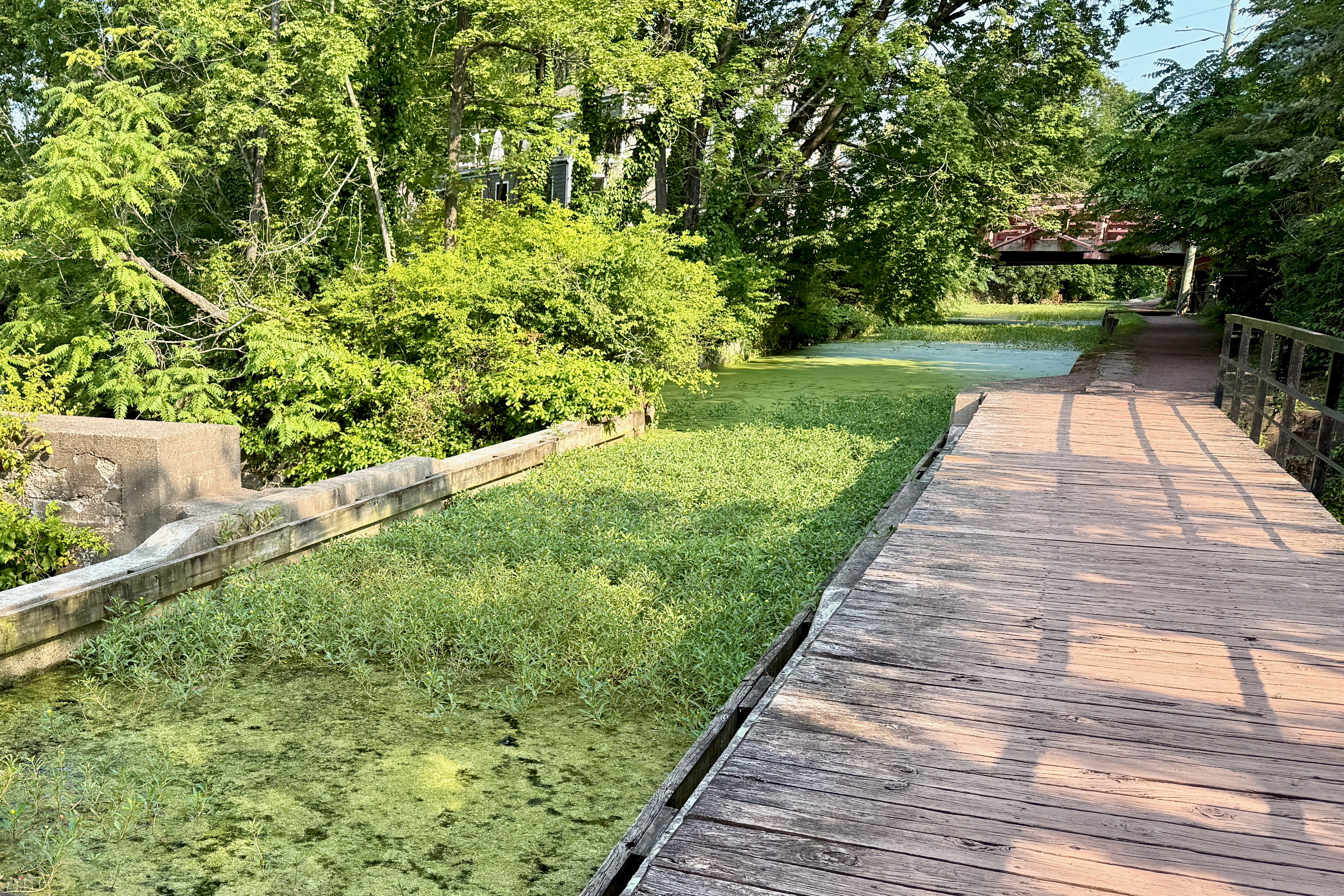
Delaware Canal aqueduct in New Hope
