= Griggstown =

Griggstown may refer to:

- Griggstown, New Jersey
  - Griggstown Quail Farm
