= Centre Bridge–Stockton Bridge =

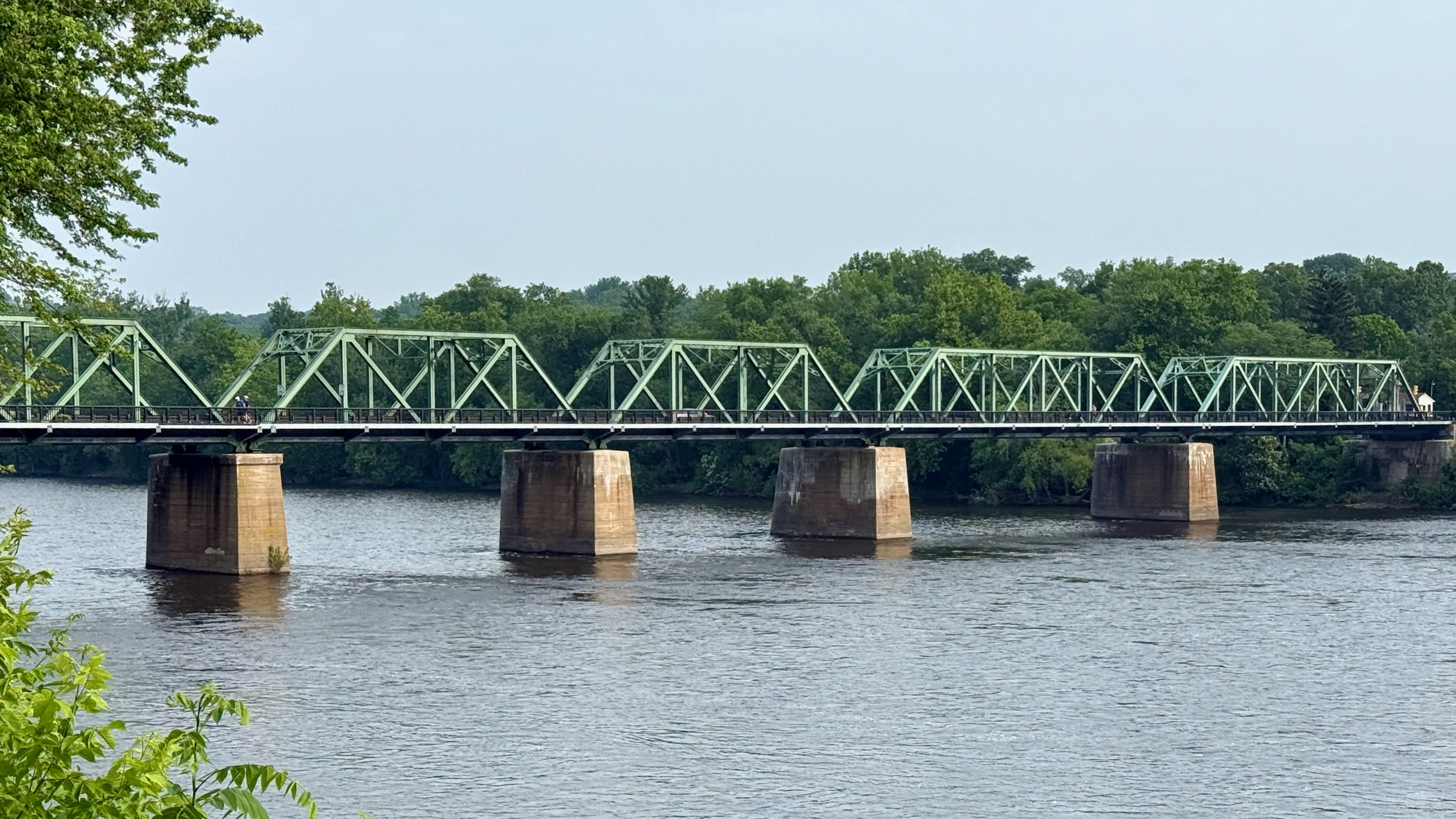
- Coordinates: 40°24′11″N 74°58′46″W
- Carries: 2 lanes of PA 263
- Crosses: Delaware River
- Locale: Stockton, New Jersey and Solebury Township, Pennsylvania
- Official name: Centre Bridge-Stockton Toll Supported Bridge
- Maintained by: Delaware River Joint Toll Bridge Commission

Characteristics
- Design: Truss bridge
- Total length: 825 feet (251 m)
- Width: 20 feet (6 m)
- Longest span: 152 feet (46 m)
- Load limit: 5 tons
- Clearance above: 12 feet (4 m)

History
- Opened: July 16, 1927

Statistics
- Daily traffic: 4,800
- Toll: None

Location
- Interactive map of Centre Bridge–Stockton Bridge

The Centre Bridge–Stockton Bridge is a free bridge over the Delaware River owned and operated by the Delaware River Joint Toll Bridge Commission. The bridge connects CR 523 and NJ 29 in Stockton, in Hunterdon County, New Jersey to PA 263 in Centre Bridge, Solebury Township, Bucks County, Pennsylvania, United States.

== History ==
For many years, the route was called Old York Road, as it was the principal route from Philadelphia to New York City. Originally, the Centre Bridge–Stockton Bridge was a covered toll bridge of wood construction was located at the former site of Reading's Ferry. First built in 1814 as a covered bridge with six spans and a total length of 821 feet built under contract by Capt. Pelig Kingsley and Benjamin Lord. The construction was faulty and the contractors were penalized $1,200. One of the piers soon gave way and had to be rebuilt.
In 1830, the entire bridge was reconstructed by a contractor Amos Campbell, the father of Henry Roe Campbell. At that time the Raritan feeder on the New Jersey side, and the Delaware Division canal on the Pennsylvania side had not been dug. At first, the canal companies built and maintained the bridges over their respective ditches.
The flood of January 8, 1841, carried away three spans, two piers and the stone toll-house all on the New Jersey side. It was only one of many bridges between Easton, Pennsylvania and Trenton, New Jersey, that was destroyed in the flood. However, the Centre Bridge–Stockton Bridge was rebuilt well enough to be one of the few bridges not washed away by the flood of October 10, 1903.

In 1923, the bridge was twice damaged by fire and then on July 22, 1923, lightning struck the bridge and the resulting fire totally destroyed the structure.

For two years after the disaster, the Centre Bridge–Stockton Bridge saw no repairs. Eventually, the Delaware River Joint Toll Bridge Commission gained control of the remnants of the bridge, and began rebuilding upon the same piers and abutments on which the first bridge had stood. Having been built higher than before, it escaped damage in the flood of 1955, which damaged many other bridges along the Delaware River. The current steel truss bridge was completed in 1926 and opened to traffic in 1927.

== Rehabilitation project ==
In September 2006, the Delaware River Joint Toll Bridge Commission awarded Road-Con an $8.4 million contract for the rehabilitation of the Centre Bridge–Stockton Bridge. For five months, the bridge was closed from 6 a.m. to 5 p.m. Mondays through Fridays, remaining fully open only on weekends. Work done on the bridge included blast cleaning and painting the bridge truss, rehabilitating the roadway deck and sidewalk, making structural repairs, and improving road signs, railings and lighting. As of the middle of May, the total cost of the project was estimated to be $9.4 million.

== The bridge in art and music ==
The fire of 1923 was depicted in a famous painting by Edward Willis Redfield who in 1898 had purchased and lived in a farm just north of the bridge.

New Jersey composer Frances White has written two compositions about the bridge: Centre Bridge (1999) and Centre Bridge (dark river)(2001). Both were inspired by the sounds of traffic on the metal grating, and both feature recordings of the bridge and river.

== Gallery ==
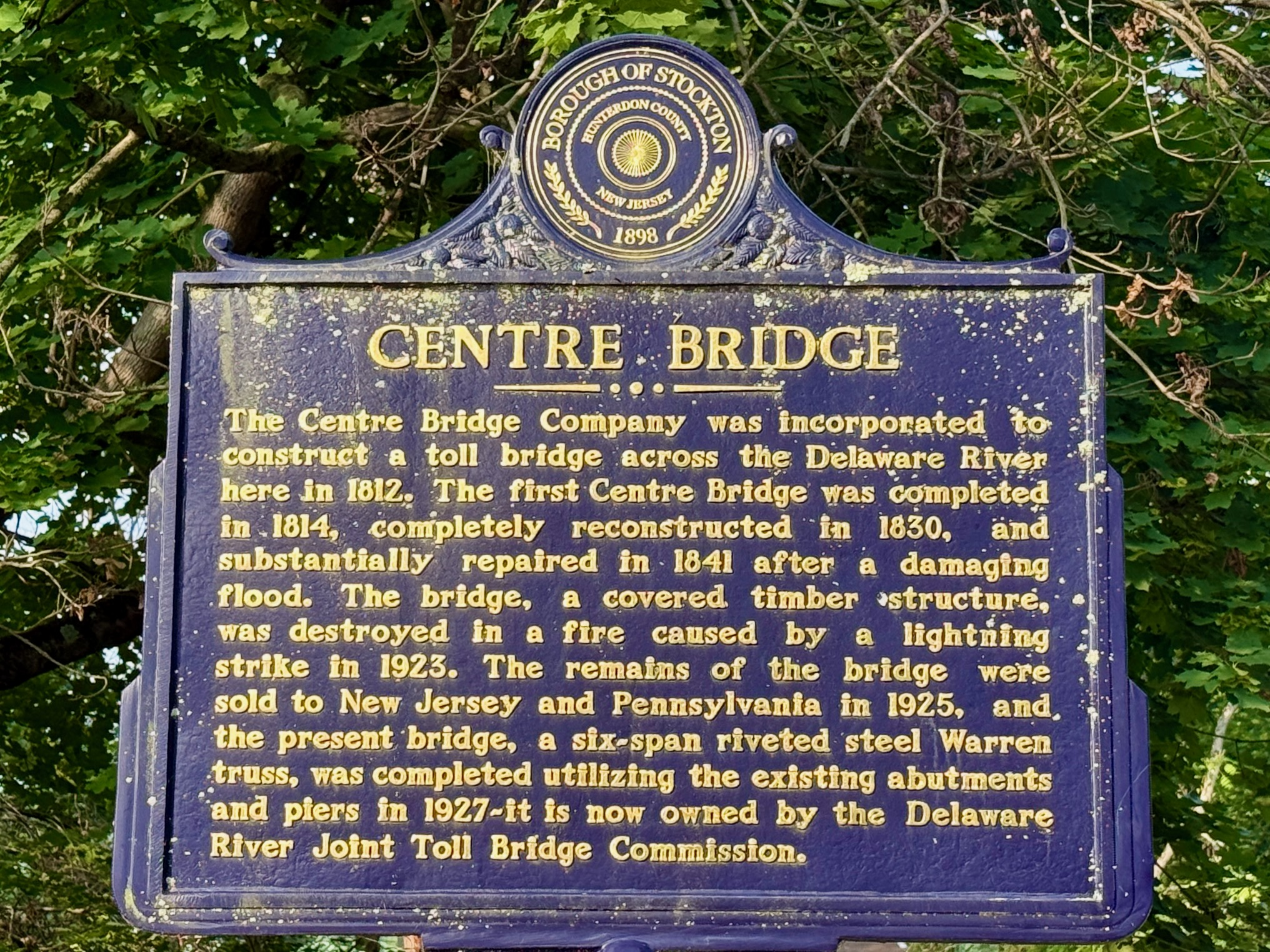
Centre Bridge information sign in Stockton

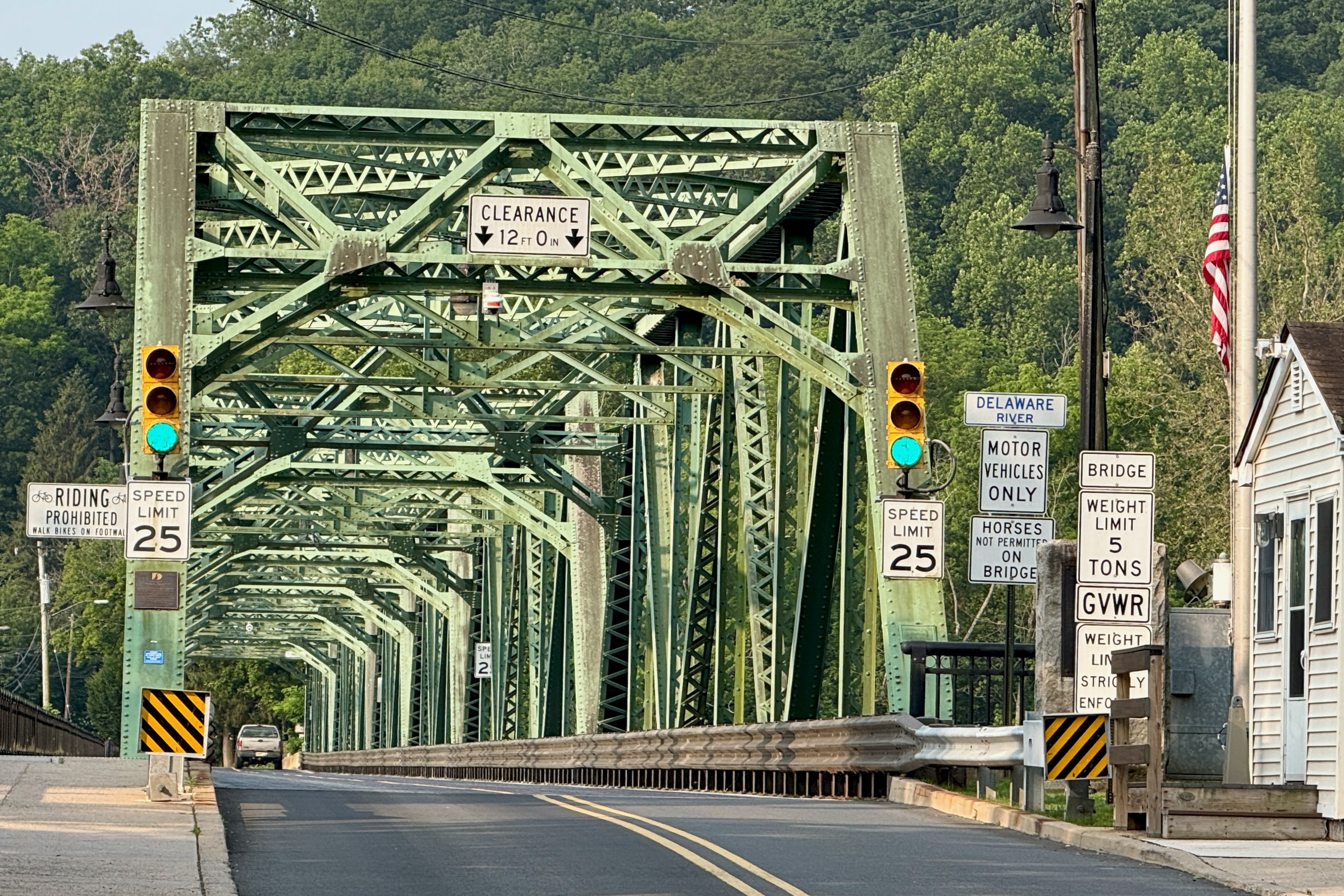
Bridge approach from Stockton

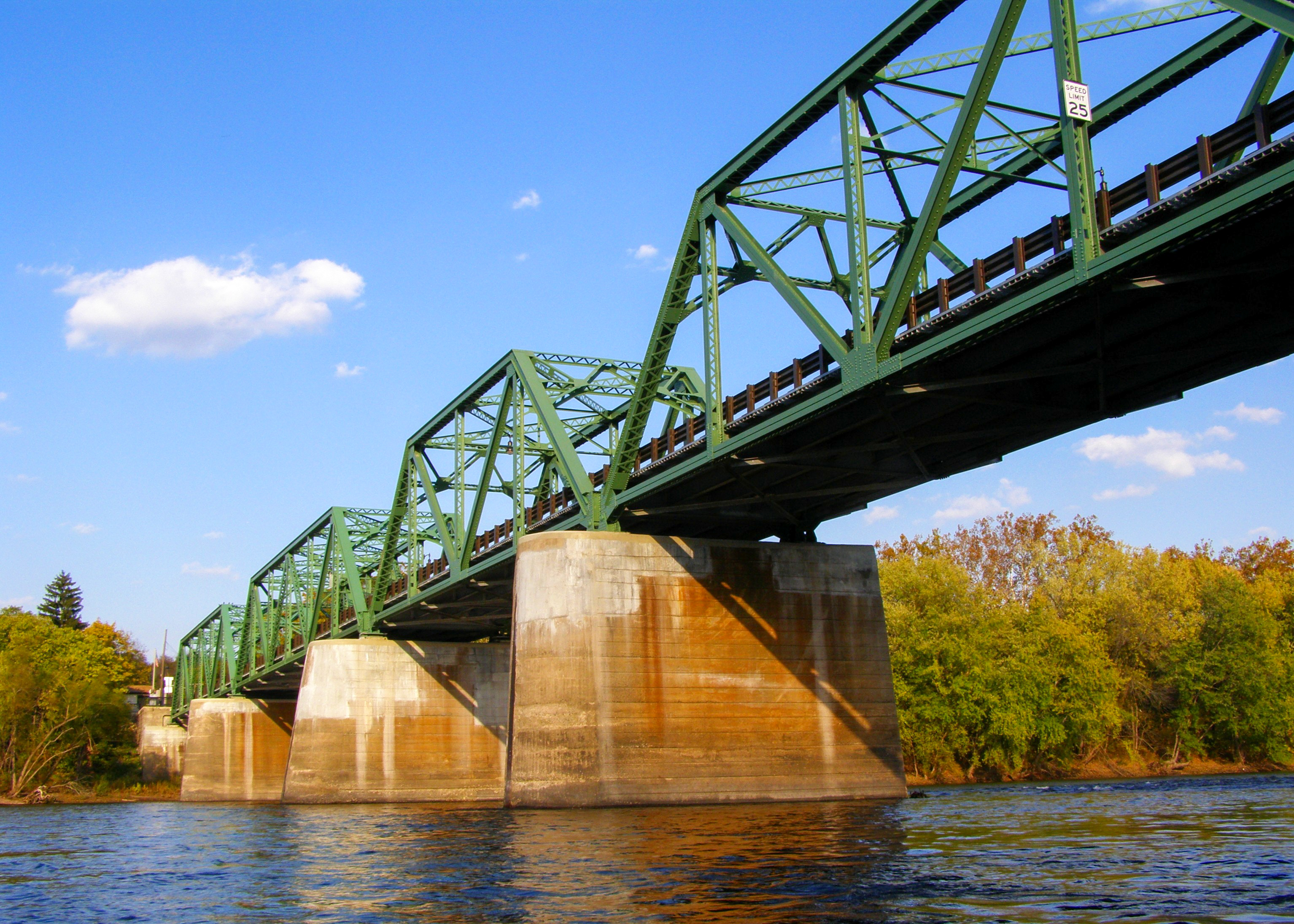
View from the Delaware River

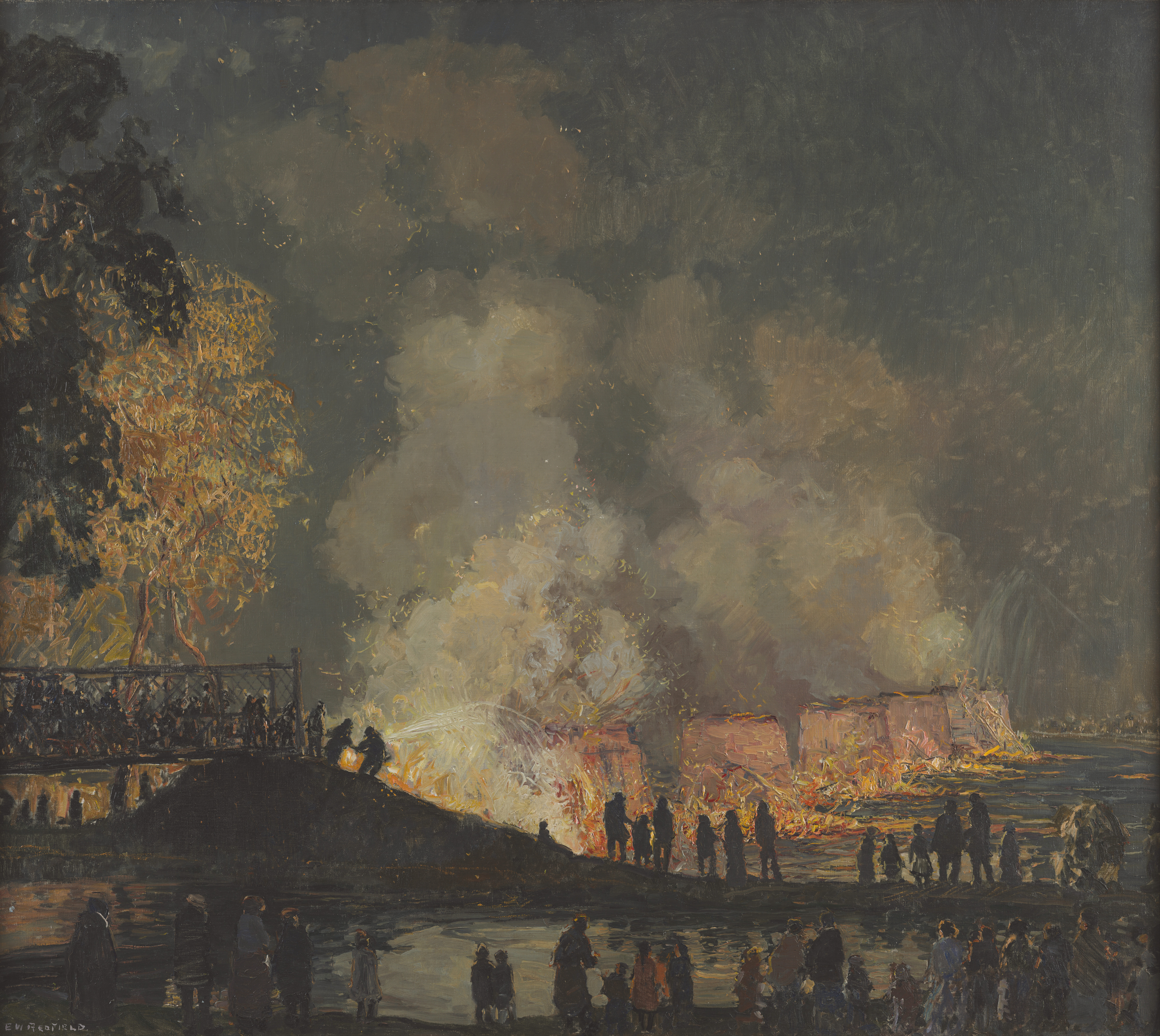
Painting of burning bridge by Edward Willis Redfield

== See also ==
- List of crossings of the Delaware River
