= Yardley Inn =

Restaurant in Pennsylvania, United States

Coordinates: 40.24455°N 74.83672°W

The Yardley Inn Restaurant & Bar, located along the Delaware River in Bucks County, Pennsylvania

The Yardley Inn Restaurant, Bar & Farm is a Zagat-rated restaurant in Bucks County, Pennsylvania, specializing in contemporary American cuisine. The Yardley Inn’s kitchen offers a diverse menu of seafood and shellfish, beef, chicken, pork, and pasta. Banquet rooms and individual dining rooms are available for private parties and special events.

From September 2004 through June 2006, three major floods devastated much of Yardley, causing the inn to close several times to repair floodwater damages and replace restaurant equipment. The damages from all three floods summed more than 1 million dollars in repairs and restorations.

The Yardley Inn added its Riverside Kitchen Garden and farm plot along River Road in early 2011, a longtime dream of Chef Eben and the owners of the inn. The garden and farmland provide many ingredients for the Yardley Inn's meals, and other ingredients like poultry and eggs from Griggstown Quail Farm and all of the inn's cheeses are sourced as locally as possible.

== History ==
Founded in 1832, The Yardley Inn originally went by the name of The White Swan. Near the Delaware River in Yardley, PA, the restaurant served as a stopping point for farmers traveling to the Philadelphia Front Street Market.

In 1882, a Temperance Reform Movement rescinded the tavern’s license. From this time until John J. Fitzgerald purchased the inn and regained the license, the building carried on as a cycler’s roadhouse.

The inn continued to enjoy much success until the flood of 1955. The White Swan closed until 1958 when it reopened as The Yardley Inn.
