= Pennsylvania Route 263 =

North–south state highway located in southeast Pennsylvania

Pennsylvania Route 263
- Map of southeastern Pennsylvania with PA 263 highlighted in red

Route information
- Maintained by PennDOT
- Length: 20.139 mi (32.411 km)
- Existed: 1928–present

Major junctions
- South end: PA 611 in Willow Grove
- PA 332 in Hatboro; PA 132 in Warminster; PA 313 in Furlong; PA 413 in Buckingham; US 202 in Buckingham; PA 32 in Centre Bridge
- North end: Route 29 at the New Jersey state line

Location
- Country: United States
- State: Pennsylvania
- Counties: Montgomery, Bucks

Highway system
- Pennsylvania State Route System; Interstate; US; State; Scenic; Legislative
| ← PA 262 | → PA 264 |

Pennsylvania Route 263 (PA 263) is a north–south state highway located in southeast Pennsylvania. The southern terminus of the route is at PA 611 in Willow Grove, Montgomery County. The northern terminus is at the Centre Bridge–Stockton Bridge over the Delaware River in Centre Bridge, Bucks County, where the road continues into Stockton, New Jersey, as Bridge Street to an intersection with Route 29. PA 263 follows the routing of Old York Road, a historic road that connected Philadelphia to New York City, and carries the name York Road from the southern terminus to Lahaska and Upper York Road north of there. From Willow Grove to Buckingham, PA 263 runs mostly through suburban areas as a four-lane road, passing through Hatboro, Warminster, and Jamison. The route forms a concurrency with U.S. Route 202 (US 202) in Buckingham and narrows to a two-lane road, splitting with that route in Lahaska. From there, the route continues through rural areas to Centre Bridge.

PA 263 follows a part of the alignment of Old York Road, which was laid out in 1711. In 1911, the portion of the current route south of Lahaska became part of Legislative Route 155. When Pennsylvania designated its state highways, PA 263 was assigned to its current alignment between Willow Grove and Centre Bridge in 1928.

== Route description ==
=== Montgomery County ===
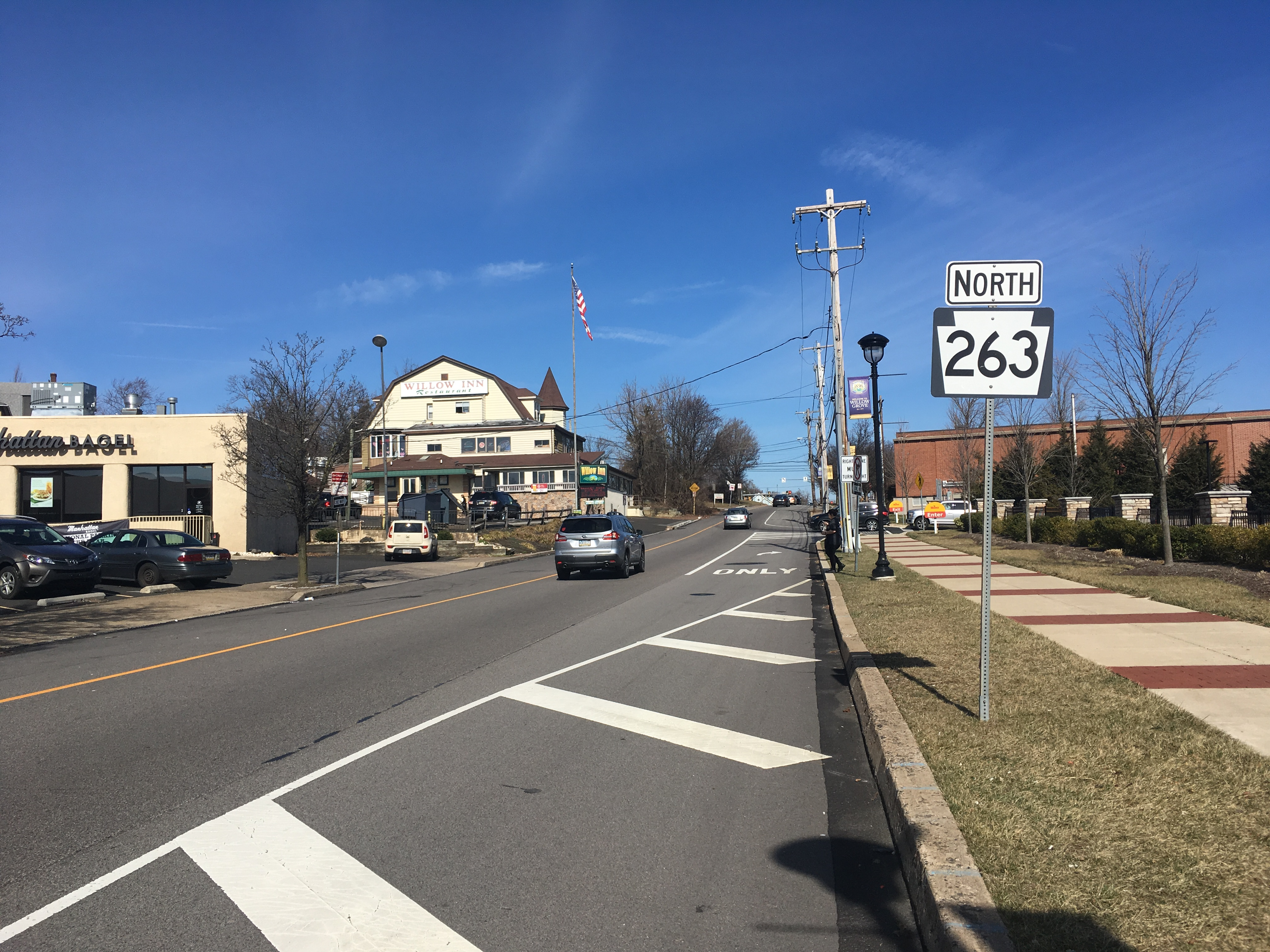
PA 263 northbound past its beginning at PA 611 in Willow Grove

PA 263 starts as North York Road at its southern terminus at PA 611 (Easton Road) in the unincorporated community of Willow Grove in Upper Moreland Township, Montgomery County. At the southern terminus, the route is split into a one-way pair, with the route carrying one lane northbound and two lanes southbound. The northbound lanes split north from northbound PA 611 while the southbound lanes head west and meet PA 611 at the Center Avenue intersection. There is no access from southbound PA 611 to PA 263. At the end of the one-way pair, the route becomes a three-lane road with one northbound lane and two southbound lanes and briefly gains a center left-turn lane past the Summit Avenue intersection. PA 263 continues north as a four-lane undivided road, passing through commercial areas with a few homes. The road has a junction with Fitzwatertown Road/Terwood Road before it passes under Norfolk Southern's Morrisville Line and turns into a divided highway called South York Road as it crosses under the Pennsylvania Turnpike (Interstate 276). Upon intersecting Mill Road/Warminster Road, PA 263 becomes undivided again as it heads into more residential surroundings.

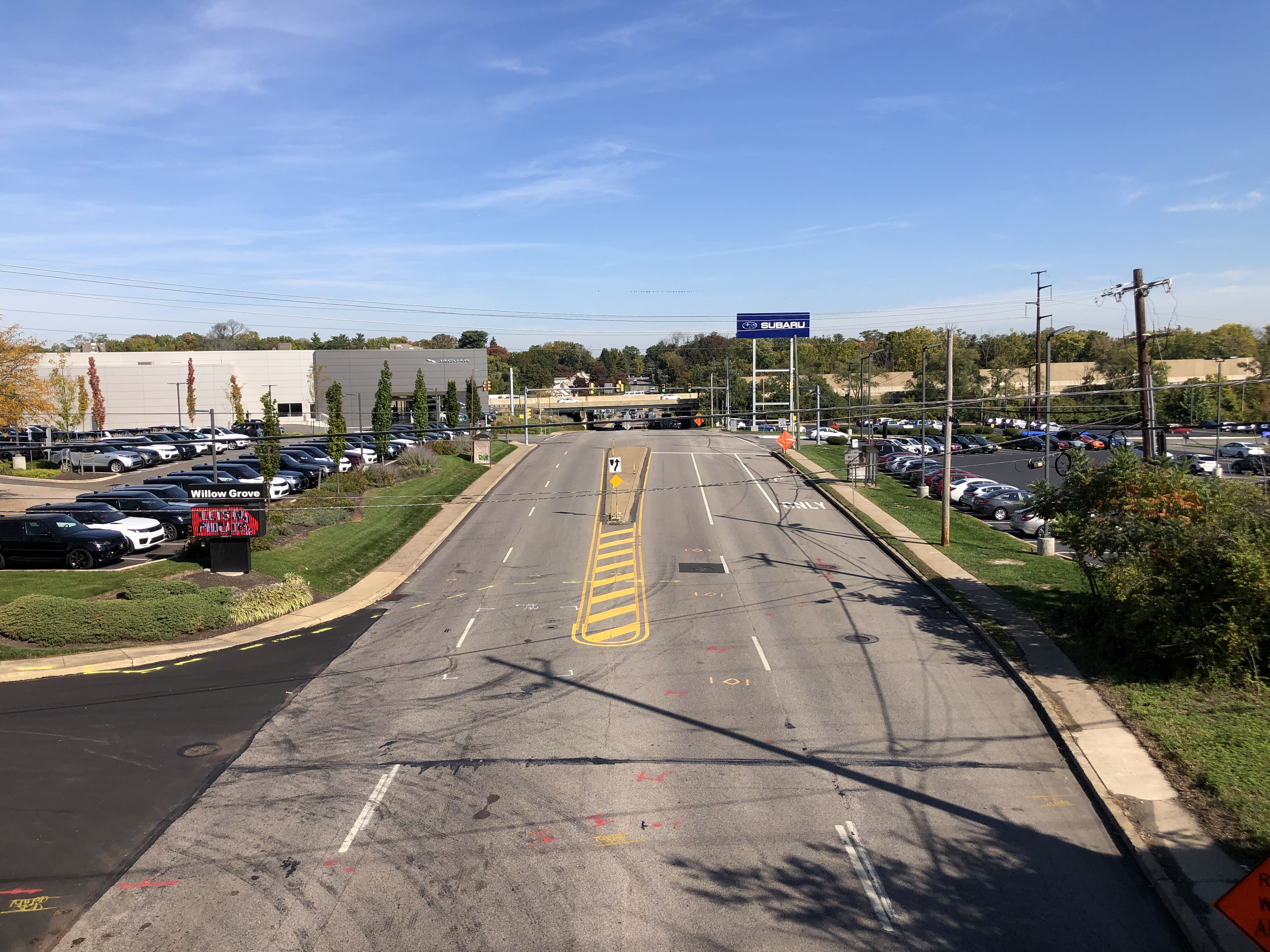
PA 263 northbound in Upper Moreland Township

The route briefly forms the border between the borough of Hatboro to the east and Upper Moreland Township to the west before fully entering Hatboro past the Newington Drive intersection. Here, PA 263 heads north prior to turning northeast and intersecting Horsham Road. At this point, the route crosses the Pennypack Creek and heads into downtown Hatboro as a three-lane road with a center left-turn lane. The route turns north at Byberry Road and becomes North York Road at the Moreland Avenue intersection before it comes to a junction with the western terminus of PA 332 (East Montgomery Avenue). After intersecting Summit Avenue, PA 263 leaves the downtown area and continues north, passing residential areas with a few businesses. Further north, the route widens into a four-lane undivided road.

=== Bucks County ===
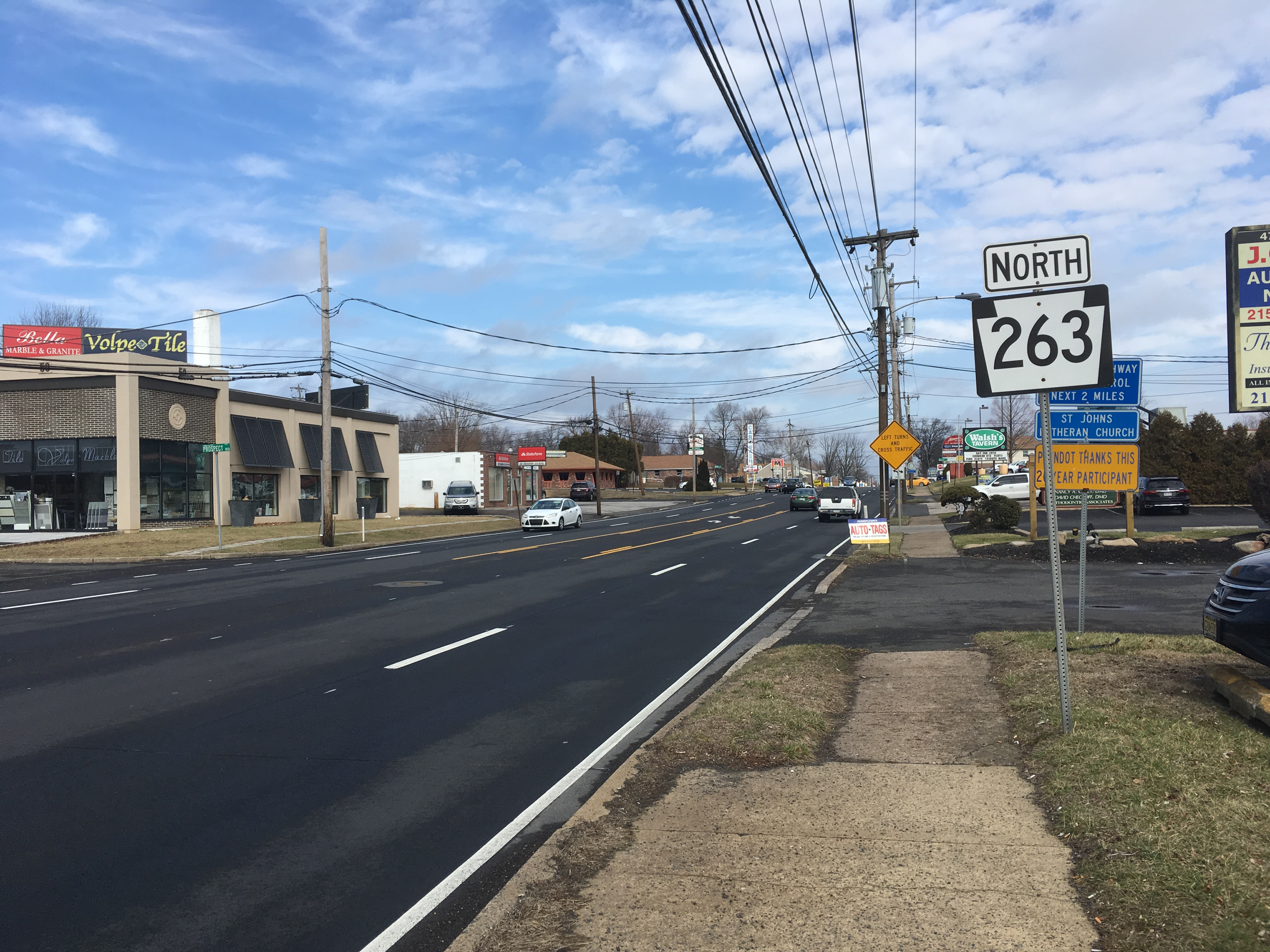
PA 263 northbound past County Line Road in Warminster Township

At the intersection with County Line Road, PA 263 briefly becomes a four-lane divided highway and enters Warminster Township in Bucks County as York Road. In Warminster Township, the route turns into a five-lane road with a center left-turn lane and passes several businesses as it comes to the PA 132 (Street Road) junction, where it becomes a four-lane divided highway that heads to the west of Archbishop Wood Catholic High School. The divided highway section ends at Roberts Road. PA 263 gains a center left-turn lane again as it continues north through more residential areas with a few businesses. Just before Bristol Road, Old York Road splits off from the route to run parallel to the west and PA 263 curves more to the northeast, retaining the name York Road.

At the junction with Bristol Road in the community of Hartsville, PA 263 enters Warwick Township and becomes a four-lane undivided highway as it turns north and runs through wooded areas with some homes, briefly becoming a divided highway as it passes over Creek Road and Little Neshaminy Creek on a bridge. The road again turns into a divided highway briefly as it intersects Old York Road. The route passes near residential and commercial development as it regains a center left-turn lane, reaching an intersection with Almshouse Road in the community of Jamison. After Almshouse Road, PA 263 continues north through business areas before heading past residential development, passing to the east of the Middle Bucks Institute of Technology. The route turns back into a divided highway as it crosses over the Neshaminy Creek in the community of Bridge Valley and regains a center left-turn lane as it passes through areas of woodland and homes. The road leaves Warwick Township for Buckingham Township at the Sugar Bottom Road intersection.

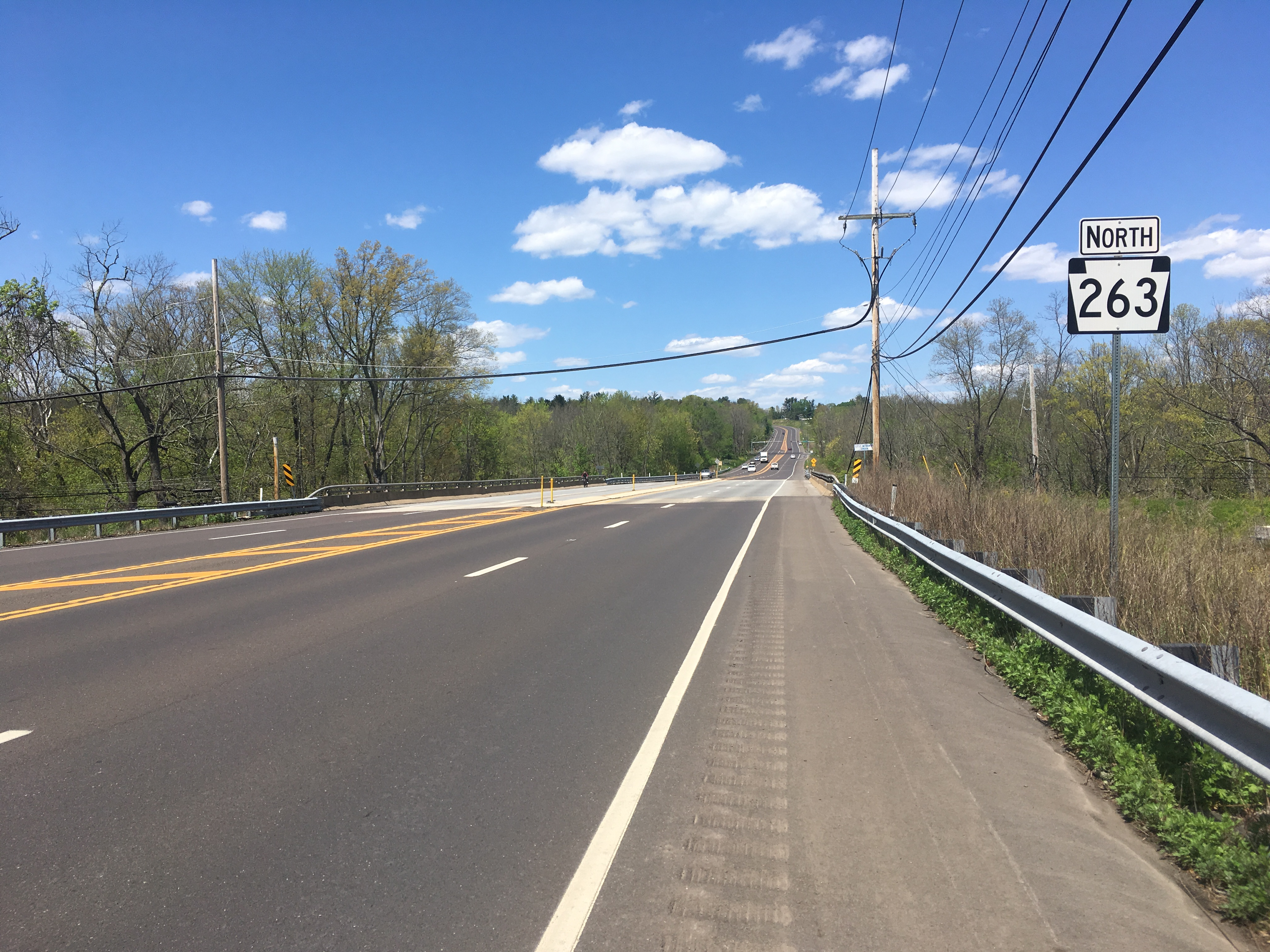
PA 263 northbound in Warwick Township

In Buckingham Township, PA 263 becomes a four-lane undivided road and passes a mix of farmland and homes, with a stretch of divided highway around the intersection with Heritage Center Drive, as it comes to the community of Furlong. Here, the road intersects Edison Furlong Road/Forest Grove Road and forms the border between Doylestown Township to the west and Buckingham Township to the east. At the intersection with the eastern terminus of PA 313 (Swamp Road), the route fully enters Buckingham Township again and intersects Furlong Road, turning northeast past a mix of farms and woods with some residences. The road briefly becomes a divided highway as it crosses Watson Creek. Farther to the northeast, the route reaches the community of Buckingham and crosses PA 413 (Durham Road).

PA 263 narrows to two lanes past this intersection and comes to a junction with US 202 a short distance later, where it forms a concurrency with US 202. This intersection has no access from northbound PA 263 to southbound US 202; access is provided via PA 413. The two routes run along a two-lane undivided road that heads through fields and woodland with some development, passing through the community of Holicong and crossing Lahaska Creek. Upon reaching the unincorporated village of Lahaska, the two routes split, with PA 263 bearing off to the left and becoming Upper York Road, a two-lane undivided road. The route passes through Peddler's Village before coming to an intersection with Street Road. At Street Road, PA 263 exits Buckingham Township and enters Solebury Township.

The road continues north into farm fields and woods with a few homes, curving more to the northeast and coming to a junction with Greenhill Road. At the Aquetong Road intersection, PA 263 turns north and back to the northeast. The route reaches the community of Solebury, where it intersects Sugan Road/Phillips Mill Road. Past this area, the road continues through wooded areas of homes, with the forests becoming denser as the road heads more to the northeast. In the village of Centre Bridge, PA 263 signage ends at PA 32 (River Road). The route officially continues to the Centre Bridge–Stockton Bridge over the Delaware Canal and the Delaware River, at which point it ends at the New Jersey state line. The road continues into the borough of Stockton, New Jersey, as Bridge Street, which heads to an intersection with Route 29 near the southern terminus of County Route 523.

== History ==
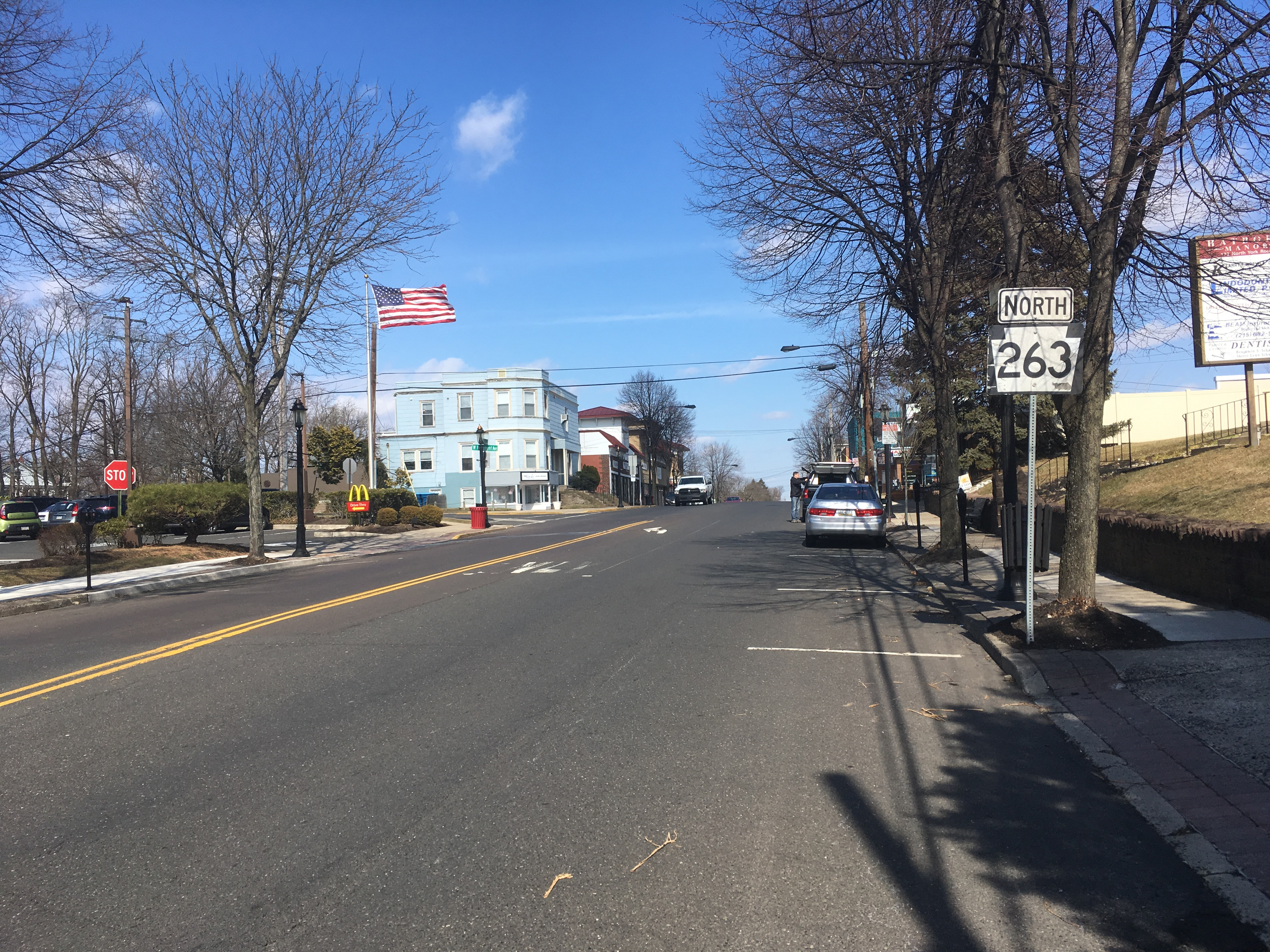
PA 263 northbound past PA 332 in Hatboro

PA 263 was originally built as part of the Old York Road, a road established in the 18th century to connect Philadelphia to New York City. The portion of the road encompassing all of PA 263 was planned in 1711 to run from Philadelphia to Centre Bridge. The Old York Road would later exist as a turnpike. In 1911, the part of PA 263 between the southern terminus and Lahaska was designated as part of Legislative Route 155, a route that ran from Willow Grove north to New Hope.

In 1928, PA 263 was designated to run from US 611 (now PA 611) in Willow Grove north to the Delaware River in Centre Bridge. The Upper York Road portion of PA 263 was paved by 1940. By 1970, work was underway on widening PA 263 to a four-lane highway between County Line Road and PA 413 in Buckingham. The widening was complete by 1971. As part of this widening, PA 263 was realigned in two places. The route was shifted to a new alignment bypassing the center of Hartsville to the east and heading across Little Neshaminy Creek, with the former alignment now Old York Road, and was shifted west to a new alignment crossing the Neshaminy Creek, bypassing the now-closed Bridge Valley Bridge.

In 2006, the section of PA 263 through Hatboro was named the Roy W. Cornell Memorial Highway in honor of Roy Cornell, a member of the Pennsylvania House of Representatives who had represented Hatboro for 25 years. In 2014, a portion of PA 263 in Warminster Township was dedicated the Officer Bradley M. Fox Memorial Highway after a Plymouth Township police officer originally from Warminster who was killed in the line of duty during 2012.

In March 2014, the Pennsylvania Department of Transportation began a $31.6 million improvement project along the section of PA 263 between Bristol Road and Sugar Bottom Road in Warwick Township. The project rebuilt the concrete road and improved several intersections along this stretch, along with rehabilitating bridges and installing new signs, signals, pavement markings, and guardrails. Work on the improvement project was completed in October 2017.

== Major intersections ==
| County | Location | mi | km | Destinations | Notes |
|---|---|---|---|---|---|
| Montgomery | Upper Moreland Township | 0.000 | 0.000 | PA 611 (Easton Road) | Southern terminus |
| Montgomery | Hatboro | 2.513 | 4.044 | PA 332 east (East Montgomery Avenue) | Western terminus of PA 332 |
| Bucks | Warminster Township | 4.435 | 7.137 | PA 132 (Street Road) | |
| Bucks | Doylestown–Buckingham township line | 11.101 | 17.865 | PA 313 west (Swamp Road) – Doylestown | Eastern terminus of PA 313 |
| Bucks | Buckingham Township | 13.080 | 21.050 | PA 413 (Durham Road) to US 202 south – Mechanicsville, Newtown | |
| Bucks | Buckingham Township | 13.300 | 21.404 | US 202 south (Doylestown Buckingham Pike) – Doylestown | No northbound exit; southern end of US 202 concurrency |
| Bucks | Buckingham Township | 15.066 | 24.246 | US 202 north (Lower York Road) – New Hope | Northern end of US 202 concurrency |
| Bucks | Solebury Township | 20.086 | 32.325 | PA 32 (River Road) – Lumberville, New Hope | |
| Delaware River | | 20.139 | 32.411 | Centre Bridge–Stockton Bridge | |
| Delaware River | | 20.139 | 32.411 | Route 29 – Stockton | Northern terminus; New Jersey state line; access via Bridge Street |
1.000 mi = 1.609 km; 1.000 km = 0.621 mi: Concurrency terminus
