= Centre Bridge, Pennsylvania =

Unincorporated community in Pennsylvania, US

- Unincorporated community
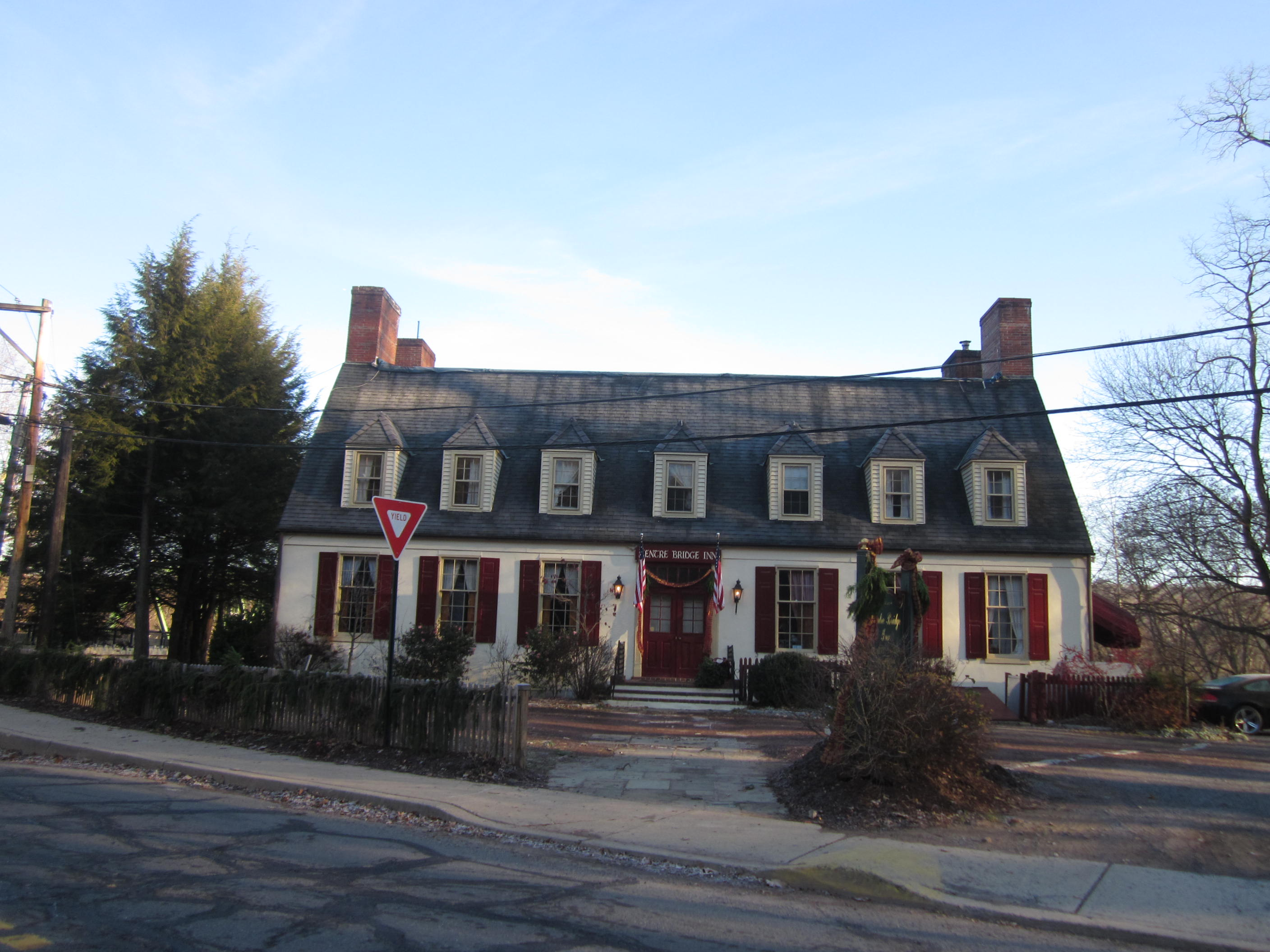
- Centre Bridge Inn

- Location within Pennsylvania Location within the United States
- Coordinates: 40°24′01″N 74°58′47″W
- Country: United States
- State: Pennsylvania
- County: Bucks
- Township: Solebury
- Elevation: 98 ft (30 m)
- Time zone: UTC-5 (Eastern (EST))
  - Summer (DST): UTC-4 (EDT)
- ZIP Code: 18938
- GNIS feature ID: 1171423

Centre Bridge, also spelled Center Bridge, is an unincorporated community on the Delaware River in Solebury Township in Bucks County, Pennsylvania, United States. Located at the crossroads of River Road (PA 32) and Upper York Road (PA 263), it lies 3 miles (4.8 km) north of New Hope. The Center Bridge Historic District was added to the National Register of Historic Places in 1985.

Centre Bridge was originally called Reading's Ferry, after the proprietor of the original ferry at this point on the Old York Road between Philadelphia and New York. In 1814, a covered wooden toll bridge was built there. In 1923, lightning struck the bridge and the resulting fire destroyed the bridge. The fire was depicted in a famous painting by Edward Willis Redfield, who lived in a farm house just north of the bridge. The current Centre Bridge–Stockton Bridge was completed in 1926.

The Delaware Canal runs along the river between Centre Bridge and the river.

For more than two hundred years, there has been an inn at the crossroads. It has burned several times; the last time it burned to the ground, in the early 1960s, the centuries-old stone walls tumbled. This time, it was rebuilt by more modern although less picturesque standards.

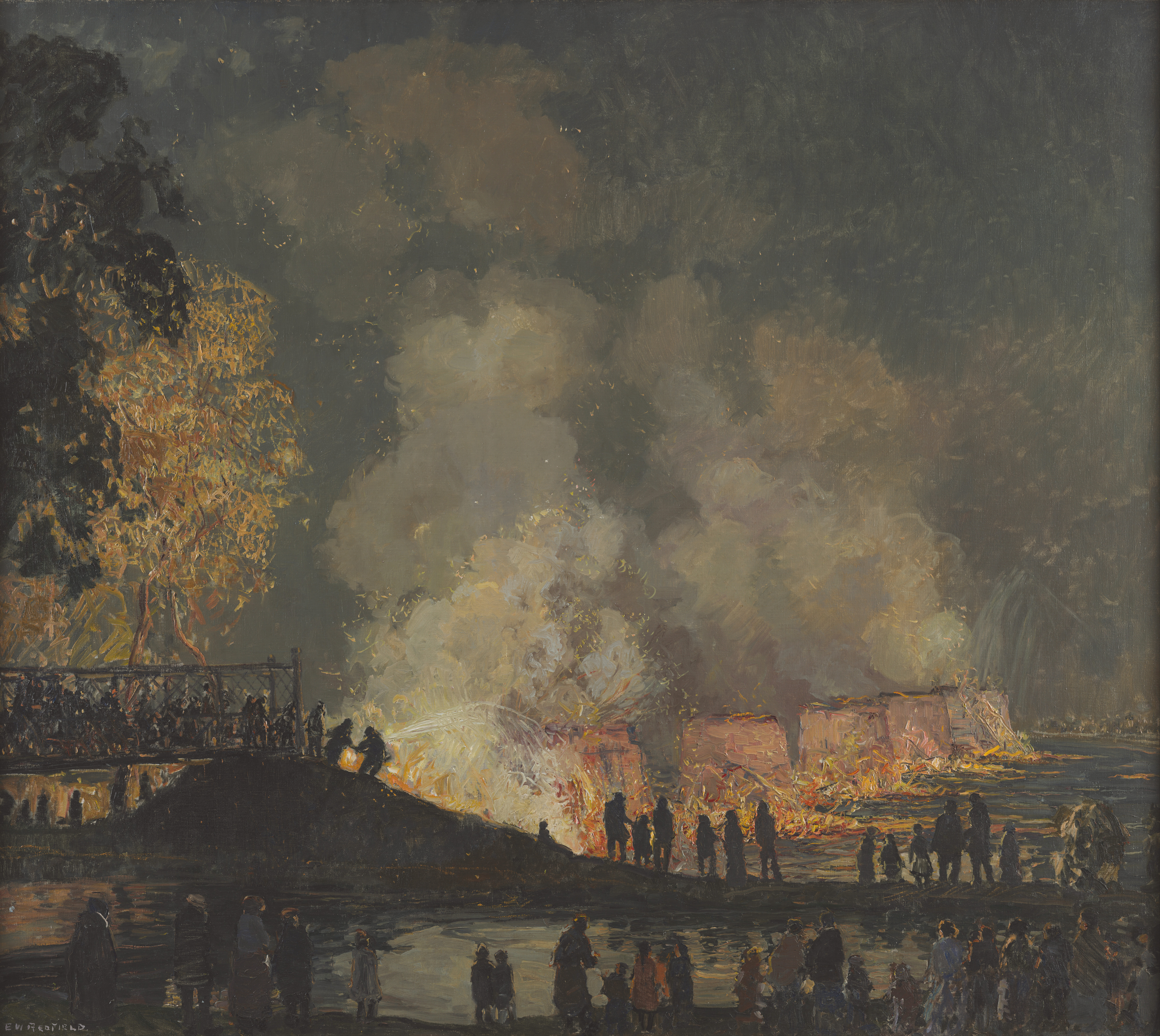
The Burning of Center Bridge by Edward Willis Redfield

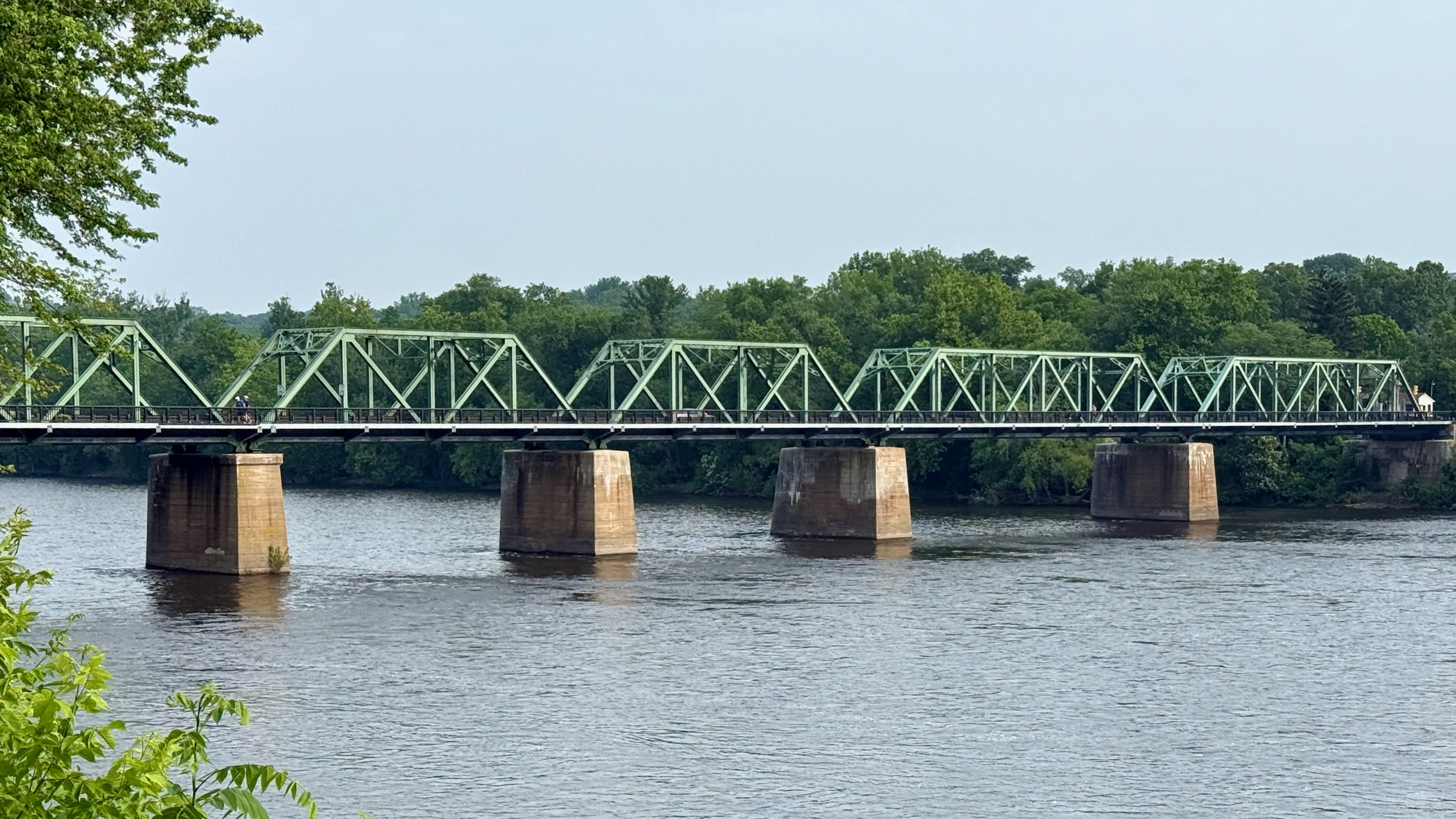
Centre Bridge–Stockton Bridge

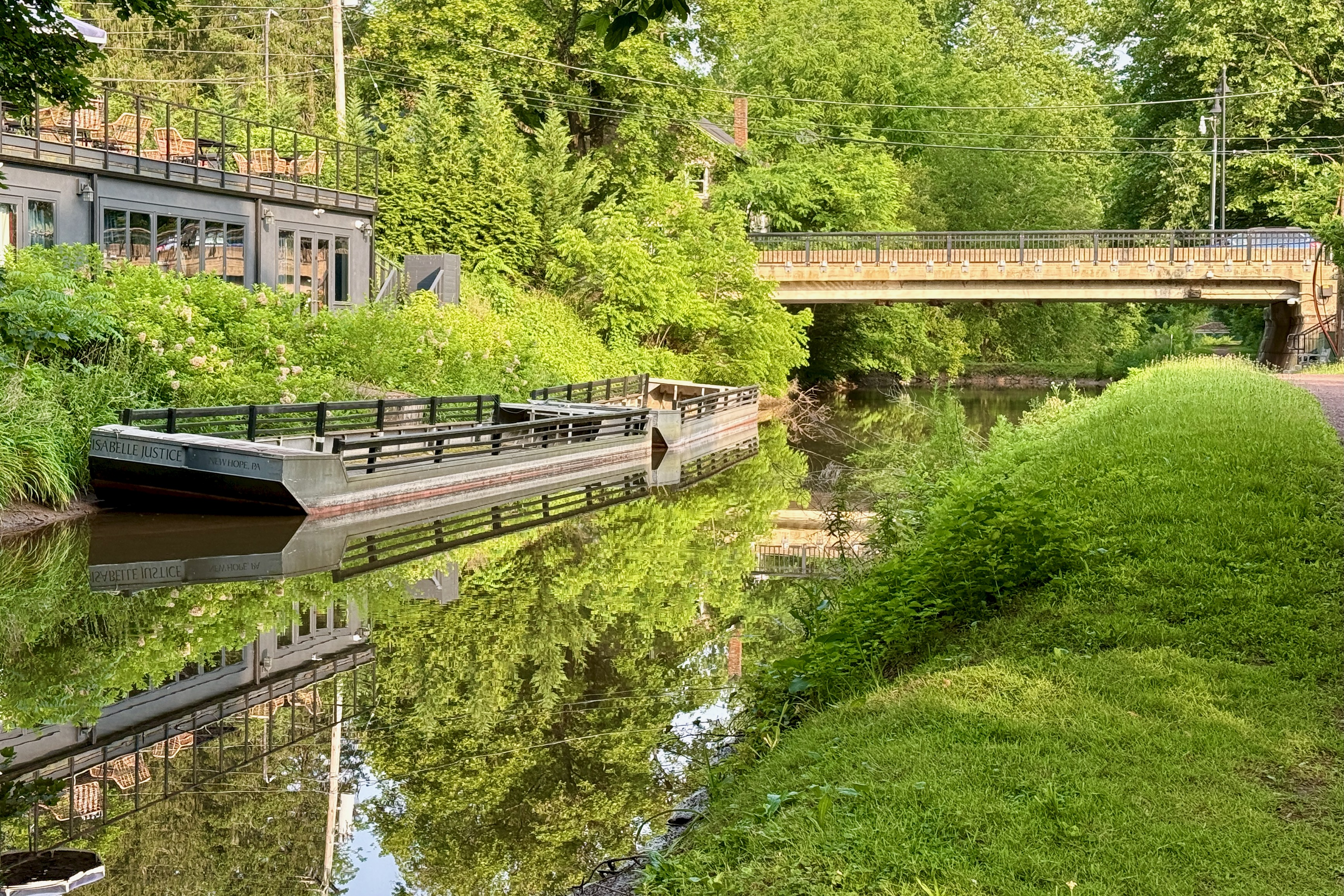
The Delaware Canal by the Upper York Road Bridge
