= Furlong, Pennsylvania =

Unincorporated community in Pennsylvania, US

- Unincorporated community
- Location within Pennsylvania Location within the United States
- Coordinates: 40°17′46″N 75°4′56″W
- Country: United States
- State: Pennsylvania
- County: Bucks
- Township: Buckingham and Doylestown
- Elevation: 312 ft (95 m)
- Time zone: UTC-5 (Eastern (EST))
  - Summer (DST): UTC-4 (EDT)
- ZIP code: 18925
- Area codes: 215, 267 and 445
- GNIS feature ID: 1203644

Furlong is an unincorporated community in Bucks County, Pennsylvania, United States. Furlong is located at the intersection of Pennsylvania Route 263 and Edison-Furlong Road/Forest Grove Road on the border of Buckingham and Doylestown townships.
