= Buckingham Friends School =

Coordinates: 40.34481°N 75.03878°W

- Lahaska, Bucks County, Pennsylvania, PA; United States

Information
- Type: Independent
- Religious affiliation: Quaker
- Established: 1794
- Head of School: Paul Lindenmaier
- Faculty: 32
- Enrollment: 164
- Average class size: 16
- Student to teacher ratio: 7:1
- Campus: 44 acres (0.18 km^{2})
- Color: Blue/Grey
- Athletics conference: Friends Schools League
- Website: www.bfs.org

Buckingham Friends School, an independent Quaker school in Lahaska, Pennsylvania was founded in 1794. The current Quaker Meetinghouse was built in 1768. An addition was built in the 1930s, followed by the gymnasium in 1955 and the lower school building. Another addition was built in 2002/2003. In 2015 the Lower School was fully renovated. The school provides for grades K-8.

== The JEM program ==
The JEM (Joint Environmental Mission) program started in 1991. It is a foreign exchange program with an environmental theme. The exchange includes schools in St. Petersburg, Russia; Belgaum, India; Honolulu, Hawaii; Ngong Hills, Kenya; Melbourne, Australia; Nanchang, China; Montmorillon, France; and Rio Blanco, Amazon Rainforest, Ecuador. The first school partnership began with School #213 in Saint Petersburg, Russia. Every 4–5 years a gathering of all JEM partner schools occurs to discuss one of the five environmental themes: Water, Soil, Light, Air, and peace. The last "Earth Summit" was held at Buckingham Friends School in April, 2013.
