= Frances White (composer) =

American composer (born 1960)

- Born: August 30, 1960 (age 66)
- Education: University of Maryland (BM); Brooklyn College; Princeton University (MA and PhD)
- Occupation: Composer
- Awards: Guggenheim Fellowship (2004)
- Musical career
- Genre: Electronic music
- Instrument: Shakuhachi
- Label: Ravello Records

Frances White (born August 30, 1960) is an American composer. A 2004 Guggenheim Fellow, she composes for the Japanese flute instrument shakuhachi and her work includes the album She Lost Her Voice, That's How We Knew (2015).

== Biography ==
White was born on August 30, 1960, to an electrical engineer father and teacher mother, and raised in Bowie, Maryland. She started learning piano when she was six and composing when she was ten, before studying music theory in high school. She obtained her BM from the University of Maryland in 1981 and her MA in Brooklyn College; both degrees were in music composition. She later obtained a second master's degree and a PhD at Princeton University. She was a MacDowell Colony Fellow in 2003 and 2005.

White composes for shakuhachi, having become interested in the instrument due to its sound. In 1998, Stephen D. Hicken of American Record Guide said that her shakuhachi/computer music piece Birdwing was an example of growing aesthetic interest in digital technology on the part of composers. In 1999, she composed the shakuhachi/tape piece Centre Bridge, inspired by the Centre Bridge–Stockton Bridge. Michelle Nagai of Organised Sound said that "White, through a process of deep immersion in an actual sounding place, and subsequently in her recordings of that place, is able to internalise her experiences as a listener" through that piece. Another piece inspired by the bridge, Center Bridge (Dark River), premiered in 2003 at the New Jersey Symphony. Susan Van Dongen of PrincetonInfo said that "her sensuous, atmospheric compositions ... blend her writing with natural and ambient sounds". In 2004, she was awarded a Guggenheim Fellowship.

White composed the album She Lost Her Voice, That's How We Knew, released in 2015 by Ravello Records. She and Wendy Steiner composed a chamber opera, Upon Reflection, during the COVID-19 pandemic. She later wrote another shakuhachi piece called "The Book of Evening", inspired by the Mark Strand poem Moon. She co-produced Trio Getsuro's 2022 shakuhachi album Trio Getsuro: Music from Innisfree.

White lives in the Griggstown section of Franklin Township, Somerset County, New Jersey, with her husband, musicologist and pianist James Pritchett.
