= Benjamin Griggs =

Benjamin Griggs (1690—1768) was one of the earliest European settlers of the area that would later be known as Griggstown in Franklin Township, Somerset County, New Jersey, United States. The community takes its name after the grist mill that Griggs established on the Millstone River.

== Biography ==
Benjamin Griggs was one of four sons born to John and Elizabeth Griggs in Gravesend, Brooklyn. He migrated westward into New Jersey along with his brothers Daniel, Samuel, and Thomas after 1715. Unlike his brothers, who became prominent farmers in the area, Benjamin established a mill on the Millstone River by 1733 that also served as a meeting place for the European settlers.

== See also ==
- Colonial history of New Jersey
- British colonization of the Americas
