= Lahaska, Pennsylvania =

Unincorporated community in Pennsylvania, US

- Unincorporated community
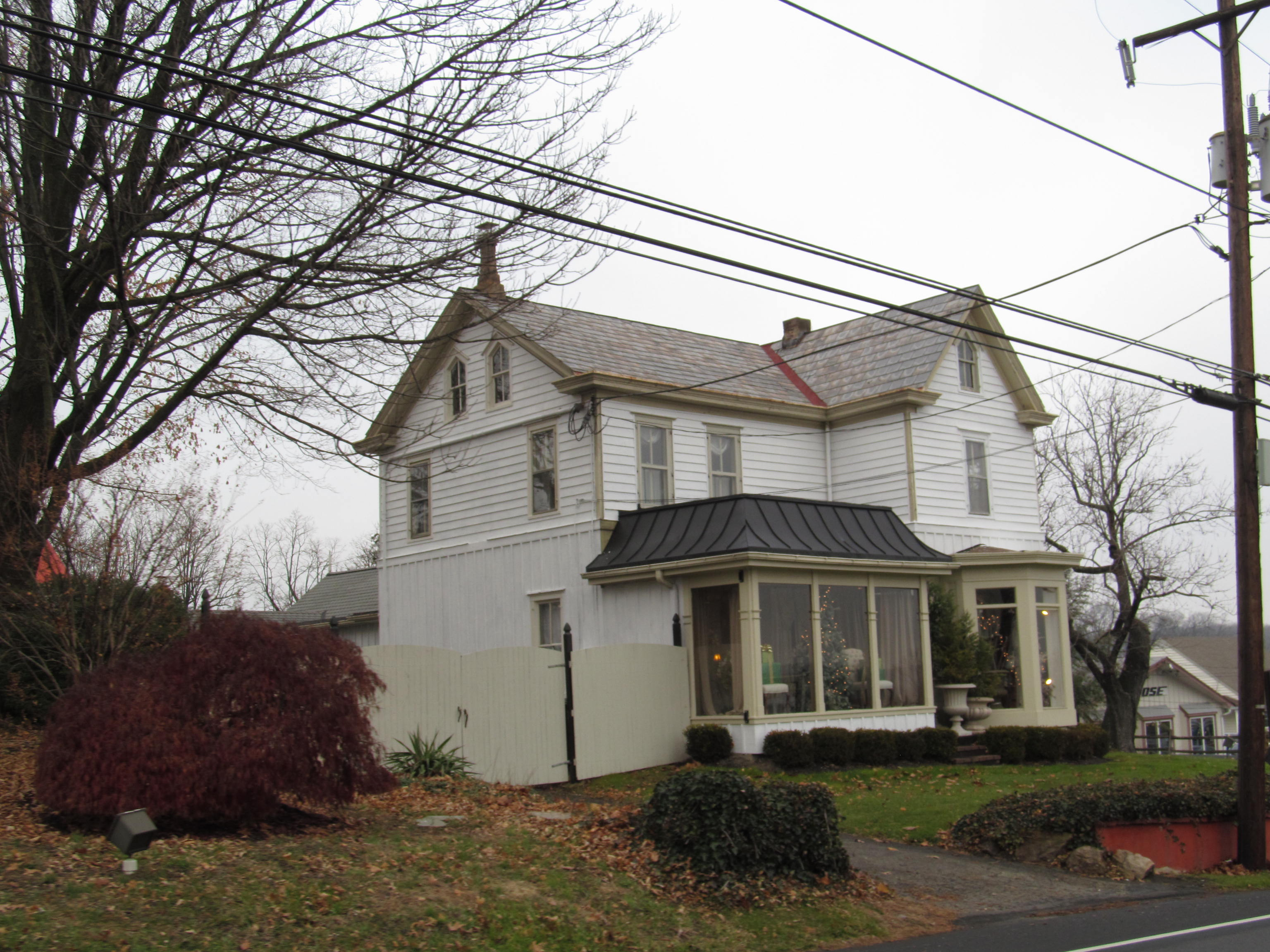
- House in Lahaska

- Location within Pennsylvania Location within the United States
- Coordinates: 40°20′47″N 75°01′54″W
- Country: United States
- State: Pennsylvania
- County: Bucks
- Township: Buckingham and Solebury
- Elevation: 305 ft (93 m)
- Time zone: UTC-5 (Eastern (EST))
  - Summer (DST): UTC-4 (EDT)
- ZIP Code: 18931
- Area codes: 215, 267 and 445
- GNIS feature ID: 1203972

Lahaska is an unincorporated community in central Bucks County, Pennsylvania, United States. It lies east of Buckingham and west of New Hope on Route 202 and Route 263. While most of it is in Buckingham Township, it also extends into Solebury Township.

While the village has its own box Post Office with the ZIP Code of 18931, surrounding areas use the Doylestown ZIP code of 18902 or the New Hope ZIP code of 18938. Lahaska is home to one of the most popular shopping areas in the region, Peddler's Village, as well as Buckingham Friends School, a private Quaker school for grades K-8.

Lahaska is also the southern terminus for most New Hope Railroad excursion trains from New Hope.
