= Edward Willis Redfield =

American painter

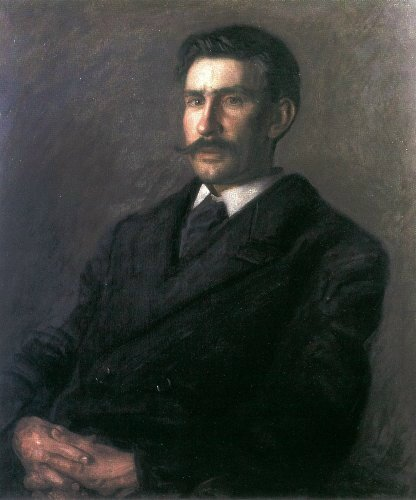
- Portrait of Edward W. Redfield by Thomas Eakins
- Born: December 18, 1869; Bridgeville, Delaware, U.S.
- Died: October 19, 1965 (aged 95)
- Education: Pennsylvania Academy of the Fine Arts, Académie Julian, École des Beaux-Arts
- Known for: Impressionism, Landscape art

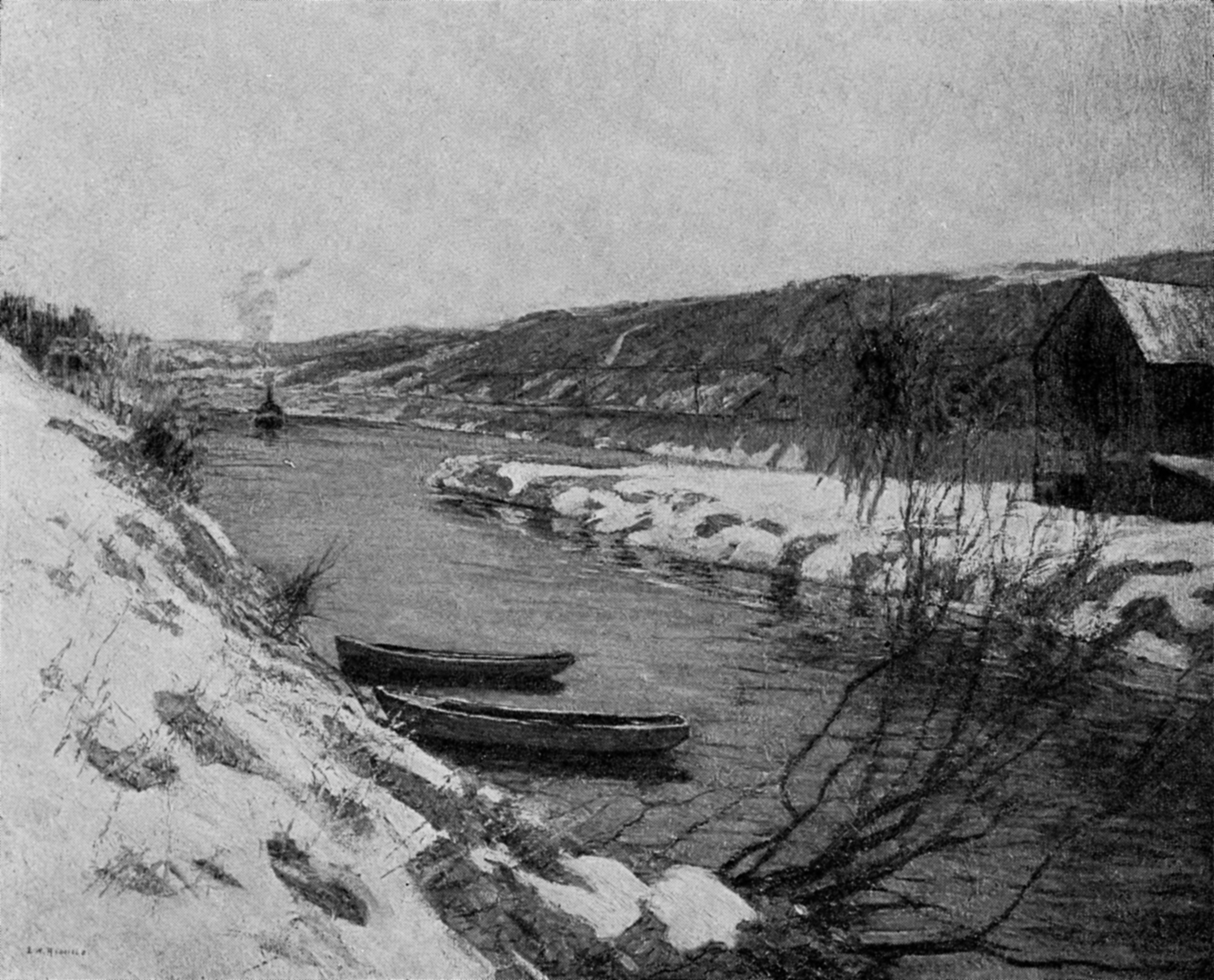
Black-and-white reproduction of "The Canal, Evening" by Edward Willis Redfield.

Edward Willis Redfield (December 18, 1869 – October 19, 1965) was an American Impressionist landscape painter and member of the art colony at New Hope, Pennsylvania. He is best known today for his impressionist scenes of the New Hope area, often depicting the snow-covered countryside. He also spent his summers on Boothbay Harbor, Maine, where he interpreted the local coastline. He frequently painted Maine's Monhegan Island.

== Biography ==
Redfield was born in 1869 in Bridgeville, Delaware. He showed artistic talent at an early age, and from 1887 to 1889 studied painting at the Pennsylvania Academy of the Fine Arts in Philadelphia. His teachers at the Academy included Thomas Anshutz, James Kelly and Thomas Hovenden. Anshutz maintained the teaching methods of Thomas Eakins, which focused on an intense study of the nude as well as on human anatomy. While at the Academy, Redfield met Robert Henri, who was later to become an important American painter and teacher, and the two became lifelong friends. His other Academy friends included the sculptors Charles Grafly and Alexander Sterling Calder (the father of the noted modern sculptor of mobiles).

Redfield and Robert Henri traveled to France and studied at the Académie Julian and the École des Beaux-Arts. At both French art academies, he studied with William Adolphe Bouguereau, one of the leading and best-known French academic painters. In Europe, Redfield admired the work of impressionist painters Claude Monet, Camille Pissarro, and Norwegian Fritz Thaulow. In France he met Elise Deligant, the daughter of an innkeeper, and the two married in 1893.

Redfield and his wife returned to America and settled in Centre Bridge, Pennsylvania, near New Hope in 1898. He was one of the first painters to move to the area, and is sometimes considered a co-founder of the artist colony at New Hope along with William Langson Lathrop, who arrived in the same year. Redfield would be considered the leader of a group of landscape painters who settled near the Delaware River, north of the Pennsylvania town of New Hope. His art was seen as totally American, not copying the style of the French Impressionists as earlier American Impressionists, such as Childe Hassam had done. The artist and critic Guy Pène du Bois wrote, "The Pennsylvania School of Landscape Painters, whose leader is Edward W. Redfield, is our first truly national expression... It began under the influence of the technique of the French Impressionists. It has restricted itself patriotically to the painting of the typical American landscape." J. Nilsen Laurvik was an even greater champion of the art of Redfield. He wrote, "Among the men who have done most to infuse an authentic note of nationalism into contemporary American Art, Edward Redfield occupies a prominent position. He is the standard bearer of that progressive group of painters who are glorifying American Landscape painting with a veracity and force that is astonishing the eyes of the Old World..."

Redfield and the other members of the group had a huge influence on twentieth-century American landscape painting. In fact, the later American landscape painter Emile Gruppe, who was not part of this Pennsylvania School of Landscape Painting, wrote, "I can still remember the great National Academy shows. Three painters dominated the walls: Edward Redfield, Daniel Garber and Elmer Schofield. They all worked boldly and with wonderful color – and you never critically compared them, for you loved each one when you stood in front of his canvas."

Unlike New York City or Boston, Philadelphia (with the exceptions of Hugh Breckenridge and Daniel Garber, both of whom taught at the Pennsylvania Academy of Fine Arts there), never really developed as a mecca for Impressionist painters. In fact, William Gerdts has written, "The major "school" of Impressionism flourished not in Philadelphia but in the area around New Hope. Its central figure was Edward Redfield..." But Redfield and his circle were primarily landscape painters, and preferred undeveloped rural Bucks County to the urban sprawl of Philadelphia. Nonetheless, Redfield was excited by the rising architecture of New York.

Although in a Tonalist rather than in an Impressionist style, Redfield spent at least six months in New York City in 1909 creating an important group of city views. These were very large works, which were panoramic in nature. Redfield's artistic associates from Philadelphia, including Henri, John Sloan, William Glackens and George Luks (the Ashcan School) had already moved to Manhattan. But unlike them, Redfield painted idealized views of city life – aerial views in which the figures were very small, and the focus was on the mood of the East River. The largest of these, an oil painting titled Between Daylight and Darkness (private collection), measures 50 x 56 inches and is probably the largest New York City scene by an American painter from that time. Between Daylight and Darkness is reproduced in Matthew Baigell's A Concise History of American Painting and Sculpture.

Redfield's impressionist landscapes are noted for their bold application of paint and vibrant color. He painted en plein air, directly from nature rather than in a studio. He built a heavy impasto, "in one go" or in one session, usually outdoors, often under brutal winter weather conditions, roping the backs of his often huge canvases to trees, so that they would not blow away in the wind. He became regarded as the leading 20th-century American painter of winter, winning more awards than any other American painter, with the exception of John Singer Sargent. His works were exhibited nationwide, and twenty-seven of them were featured at the Panama-Pacific International Exposition (1915) in San Francisco, an important venue for artists of the time.

Redfield began painting spring scenes in the late teens. Most of these are characterized by thick impasto, painted in a style similar to his snow scenes. The influence of Vincent Van Gogh's spring scenes which Van Gogh painted in Arles (from February 1888 to May 1889), is fairly evident, as Van Gogh also used a fairly thick impasto – but never as thick as Redfield's. However, Redfield apparently never mentioned Van Gogh. Redfield maintained a studio in Point Pleasant, Pennsylvania, which is located close to the Delaware River, off of River Road, north of the artist's home at Center Bridge. Redfield executed several related spring scenes there circa 1920–1930. Road to the River (circa 1920, Manoogian Collection) is a representative example. It depicts early spring in the Delaware Valley from the Pennsylvania side, with New Jersey hills on the viewer's left. A girl walks along a path accompanied by her two ducks, as trees are just beginning to blossom. The girl may be one of the painter's two daughters, Louise or Elise. "Road to the River" was one of Redfield's favorite titles, especially during the 1920s, and he used it for at least four other paintings depicting different seasons and locales; this is most likely the painting with this title that was exhibited in 1920 at the Art Club of Philadelphia. Although during his lifetime, Redfield was acclaimed primarily for his winter landscapes, the spring scenes are among his most prized paintings today.

Beginning in 1903, the Redfield family (the artist and his wife had five children) spent their summers at Boothbay Harbor Maine, due to the generosity of Dr. Samuel Woodward, who financed these annual vacations. Eventually, Redfield acquired a home at Boothbay Harbor, which became noted as a charming and picturesque fishing village. In June 1903, Robert Henri and his wife decided to spend the summer with the Redfields there. Redfield and Henri sailed about neighboring islands in search of suitable subject matter.

In later years, Redfield became dissatisfied with his early work. In 1947 he burned a large number of his early and/or damaged paintings that he considered sub-standard. He stopped painting in 1953. He explained, "I was outside one day. My insteps started hurting. It was very windy and I had a hard time keeping my easel up. So I quit. The main reason though, was that I wasn't good as I had been, and I didn't want to be putting my name on an 'old man's stuff,' just to keep going."

Redfield died on October 19, 1965. His paintings are in many museums, including the Metropolitan Museum of Art in New York City and the Smithsonian American Art Museum in Washington, DC. Redfield's catalogue raisonné is currently being compiled by art historian Thomas Folk.
