= Peddler's Village =

Property in Bucks County, Pennsylvania, U.S.

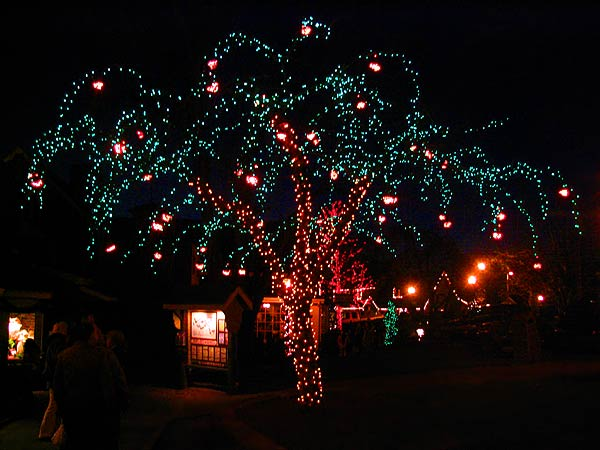
- Outdoor tree decorated with Christmas lights
- Location: Route 202 & Street Road; Lahaska, Pennsylvania 18931
- Coordinates: 40.3477°N 75.0327°W
- Website: peddlersvillage.com

Peddler's Village is a 42-acre countryside property in Bucks County, Pennsylvania, featuring 60+ retail shops and boutiques, full and quick-service restaurants, a 66-room hotel and an indoor family entertainment center.

== Popularity ==
Open year-round, Peddler's Village was the third most-visited attraction in the Philadelphia region as of 2018.

From April through December each year, Peddler's Village presents monthly weekend festivals and other eventssuch as Murder Mystery Dinner Theater shows, food truck evenings, outdoor movie nights, seasonal displays and special events. The destination, which is also used for weddings, holiday parties, reunions, retirement parties, picnics, and corporate meetings, draws two million visitors annually.

In addition to an indoor six-level climbing attraction, an arcade, a toddler area, and the Painted Pony Cafe, Giggleberry Fair features an antique Philadelphia Toboggan Company (PTC #59) carousel originally built in 1922.

== Location ==
The Village is located in Lahaska, Pennsylvania, near Doylestown and New Hope in the Philadelphia metropolitan area.

== Events ==
Yearly events include seasonal dining and entertainment, shopping, scarecrow competitions, food trucks, and a Village-wide lighting in November called the Grand Illumination Celebration. The Peddler's Village Strawberry Festival has been held since May 1969, except in 2020 when the COVID-19 pandemic caused that year's cancellation. Peddler’s Village also hosts food drives like those hosted throughout October 2023. Nonperishable food items from community members were donated to the Bucks County Housing Group.
