= Griggstown, New Jersey =

Populated place in Somerset County, New Jersey, US

- Census-designated place
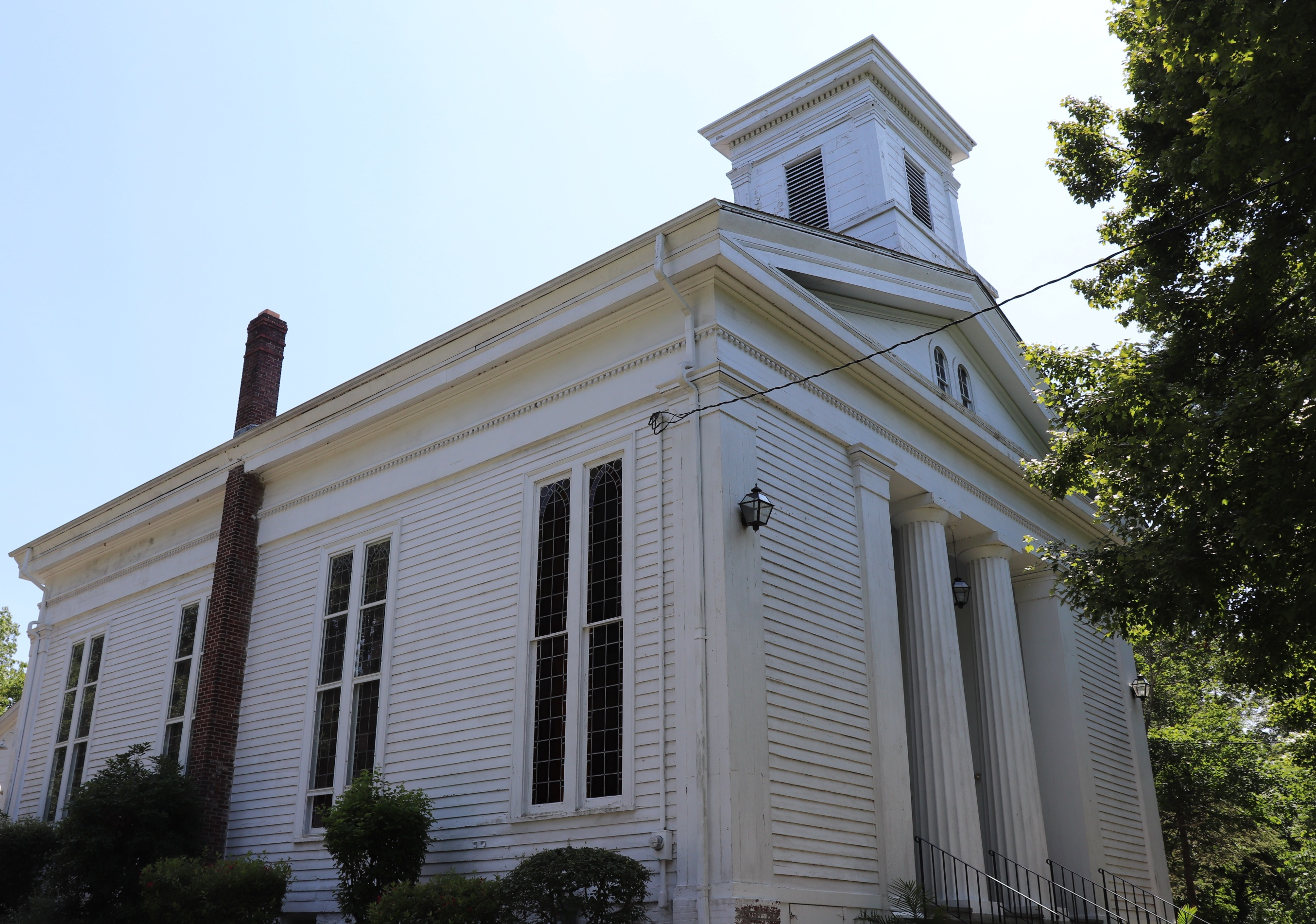
- Griggstown Reformed Church

- Location in Somerset County Location in New Jersey Location in the United States
- Coordinates: 40.439868°N 74.598319°W
- Country: United States
- State: New Jersey
- County: Somerset
- Township: Franklin
- Named for: Griggs family

Area
  - Total: 2.52 sq mi (6.52 km^{2})
  - Land: 2.44 sq mi (6.33 km^{2})
  - Water: 0.069 sq mi (0.18 km^{2}) 2.86%
- Elevation: 102 ft (31 m)

Population (2020)
  - Total: 835
  - Density: 341.4/sq mi (131.83/km^{2})
- Time zone: UTC−05:00 (Eastern (EST))
  - Summer (DST): UTC−04:00 (Eastern (EDT))
- Area codes: 609/640, 732/848 and 908
- FIPS code: 34-28470
- GNIS feature ID: 2583995

Griggstown is an unincorporated community and census-designated place (CDP) located within Franklin Township, in Somerset County, in the U.S. state of New Jersey. As of the 2020 census, Griggstown had a population of 835. The area was first settled around 1733. The Millstone River and the Delaware and Raritan Canal both flow through Griggstown.

== History ==
Many of the earliest European settlers of the area came from Gravesend, Brooklyn. Among these settlers were four sons born to John and Elizabeth Griggs: Benjamin (b. 1690), Daniel, Samuel, and Thomas. Griggstown was named after Benjamin Griggs, who established a grist mill on the Millstone River that served as a meeting place for the European farmers of the area and as such the center of the community that would become Griggstown.

From the 1970s to the early 2000s, Griggstown residents reported seeing a feral cow along the parallel Delaware and Raritan Canal and the Millstone River, said to be a ghost of one that was one of many herded along the canal in years past. An actual feral bull believed to be the phantom cow was found in a ditch in November 23, 2002, dying after being rescued.

== Geography ==
According to the United States Census Bureau, the CDP had a total area of 2.519 square miles (6.524 km^{2}), including 2.447 square miles (6.338 km^{2}) of land and 0.072 square miles (0.187 km^{2}) of water (2.86%).

Griggstown is adjacent to the communities of Kingston, Rocky Hill, Montgomery Township, Kendall Park (in South Brunswick), and Franklin Park. The closest city of note is Princeton, New Jersey.

Griggstown is accessible via Route 27 (Lincoln Highway), County Route 518 and U.S. Route 206. The major roads in Griggstown are Bunker Hill Road and Canal Road. There is also a small access road with a one-lane bridge(at one time referred to as "twin bridges") known as the Griggstown Causeway that offers access to and from Griggstown as well. The D&R Canal State Park is located on this road in conjunction with the canal side tow-path.

=== Selected sites ===
- Griggstown Quail Farm
- Griggstown Cemetery where nineteen Irish canal workers who died of cholera in an 1832-1833 epidemic are buried.
- Griggstown Volunteer Fire Company
- Griggstown Lock of the Delaware and Raritan Canal
- Griggstown Mine
- Norseville
- Sunset Hill Garden

== Demographics ==
Historical population
Census	Pop.	Note	%±
2010	819		—
2020	835		2.0%
Population sources: 2010 2020

Griggstown first appeared as a census designated place in the 2010 U.S. census.

=== 2020 census ===
Griggstown CDP, New Jersey – Racial and ethnic composition Note: the US Census treats Hispanic/Latino as an ethnic category. This table excludes Latinos from the racial categories and assigns them to a separate category. Hispanics/Latinos may be of any race.
Race / Ethnicity (NH = Non-Hispanic)	Pop 2010	Pop 2020	% 2010	% 2020
White alone (NH)	687	602	83.88%	72.10%
Black or African American alone (NH)	23	43	2.81%	5.15%
Native American or Alaska Native alone (NH)	2	1	0.24%	0.12%
Asian alone (NH)	33	65	4.03%	7.78%
Native Hawaiian or Pacific Islander alone (NH)	0	0	0.00%	0.00%
Other race alone (NH)	0	8	0.00%	0.96%
Mixed race or Multiracial (NH)	23	40	2.81%	4.79%
Hispanic or Latino (any race)	51	76	6.23%	9.10%
Total	819	835	100.00%	100.00%

=== 2010 census ===
The 2010 United States census counted 819 people, 346 households, and 230 families in the CDP. The population density was 334.7 per square mile (129.2/km^{2}). There were 364 housing units at an average density of 148.8 per square mile (57.5/km^{2}). The racial makeup was 86.81% (711) White, 2.81% (23) Black or African American, 0.24% (2) Native American, 4.03% (33) Asian, 0.00% (0) Pacific Islander, 2.56% (21) from other races, and 3.54% (29) from two or more races. Hispanic or Latino of any race were 6.23% (51) of the population.

Of the 346 households, 25.7% had children under the age of 18; 57.2% were married couples living together; 6.6% had a female householder with no husband present and 33.5% were non-families. Of all households, 27.2% were made up of individuals and 11.6% had someone living alone who was 65 years of age or older. The average household size was 2.36 and the average family size was 2.92.

18.1% of the population were under the age of 18, 4.6% from 18 to 24, 27.5% from 25 to 44, 32.4% from 45 to 64, and 17.5% who were 65 years of age or older. The median age was 44.9 years. For every 100 females, the population had 101.7 males. For every 100 females ages 18 and older there were 101.5 males.

== Historic district ==
- Griggstown Historic District
- U.S. National Register of Historic Places
- U.S. Historic district
- New Jersey Register of Historic Places
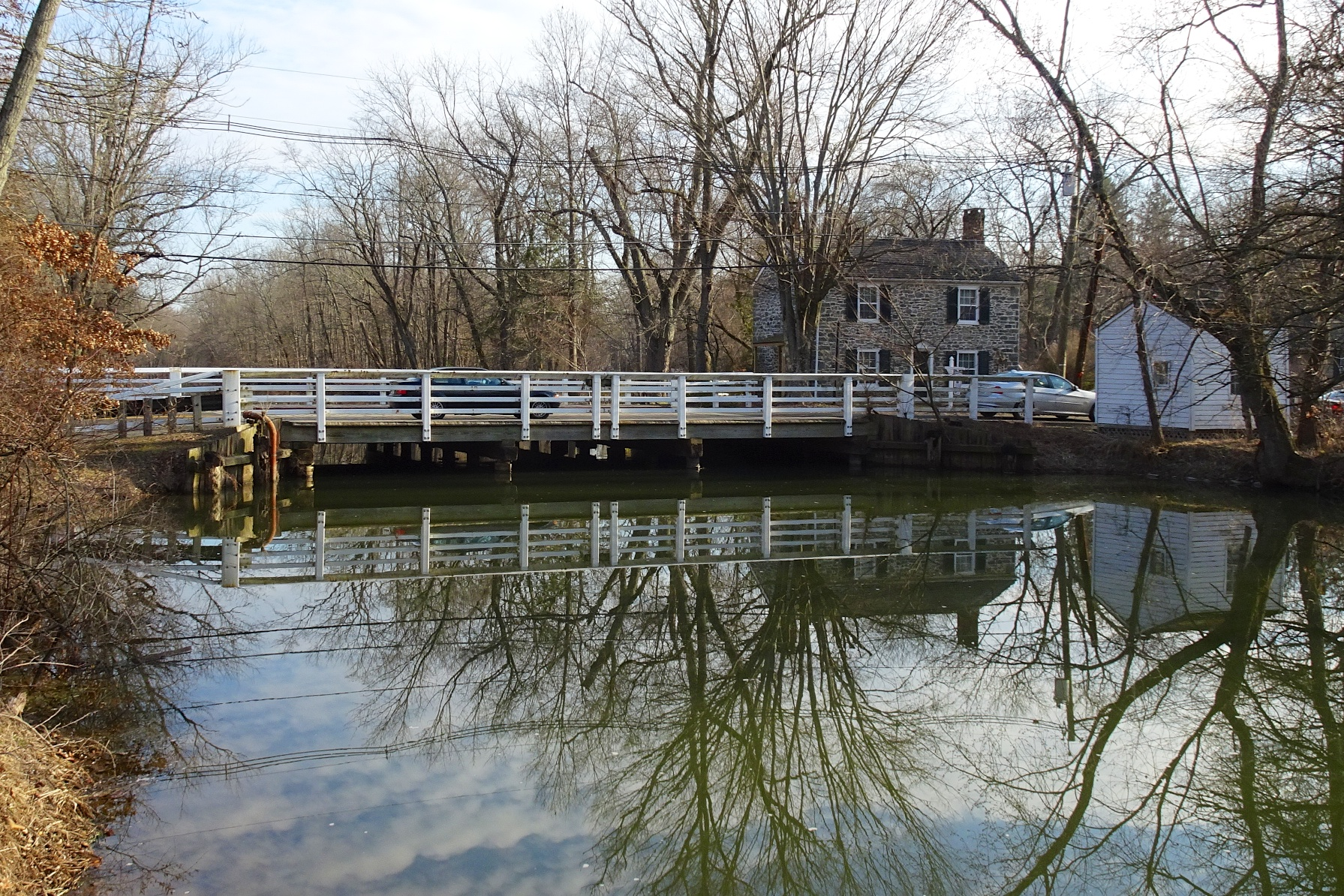
- Bridge Tender's House and bridge over the Delaware and Raritan Canal
- Location: Roughly Canal Road from Old Georgetown Road to Ten Mile Run
- Area: 861 acres (348 ha)
- NRHP reference No.: 84002798
- NJRHP No.: 2496

Significant dates
- Added to NRHP: August 2, 1984
- Designated NJRHP: June 21, 1984

The Griggstown Historic District is a 861-acre (348 ha) national historic district encompassing the community along Canal Road from Old Georgetown Road to Ten Mile Run. It was added to the National Register of Historic Places on August 2, 1984 for its significance in agriculture, architecture, commerce, industry, and transportation. The district includes 68 contributing buildings. The Griggstown Reformed Church was established in 1842 as the First Reformed Protestant Dutch Church of Griggstown. The building was dedicated on August 8, 1843, and features Greek Revival architecture. The Bridge Tender's House, the Bridge Tender’s Station and the Lock Tender's House, all built for the Delaware and Raritan Canal, are contributing buildings.

== Notable people ==
People who were born in, residents of, or otherwise closely associated with Griggstown include:

- Benjamin Griggs (1690-1768), founder of the grist mill for which Griggstown is named
- John Honeyman (1729-1822), American spy for George Washington, who gathered the intelligence crucial to Washington's victory in the Battle of Trenton
- Paul Muldoon (born 1951) writer, academic and educator, as well as Pulitzer Prize-winning poet originally from County Armagh, Northern Ireland
- Frances White (born 1960), composer and 2004 Guggenheim Fellow, who composes for the Japanese flute instrument shakuhachi

== Gallery ==
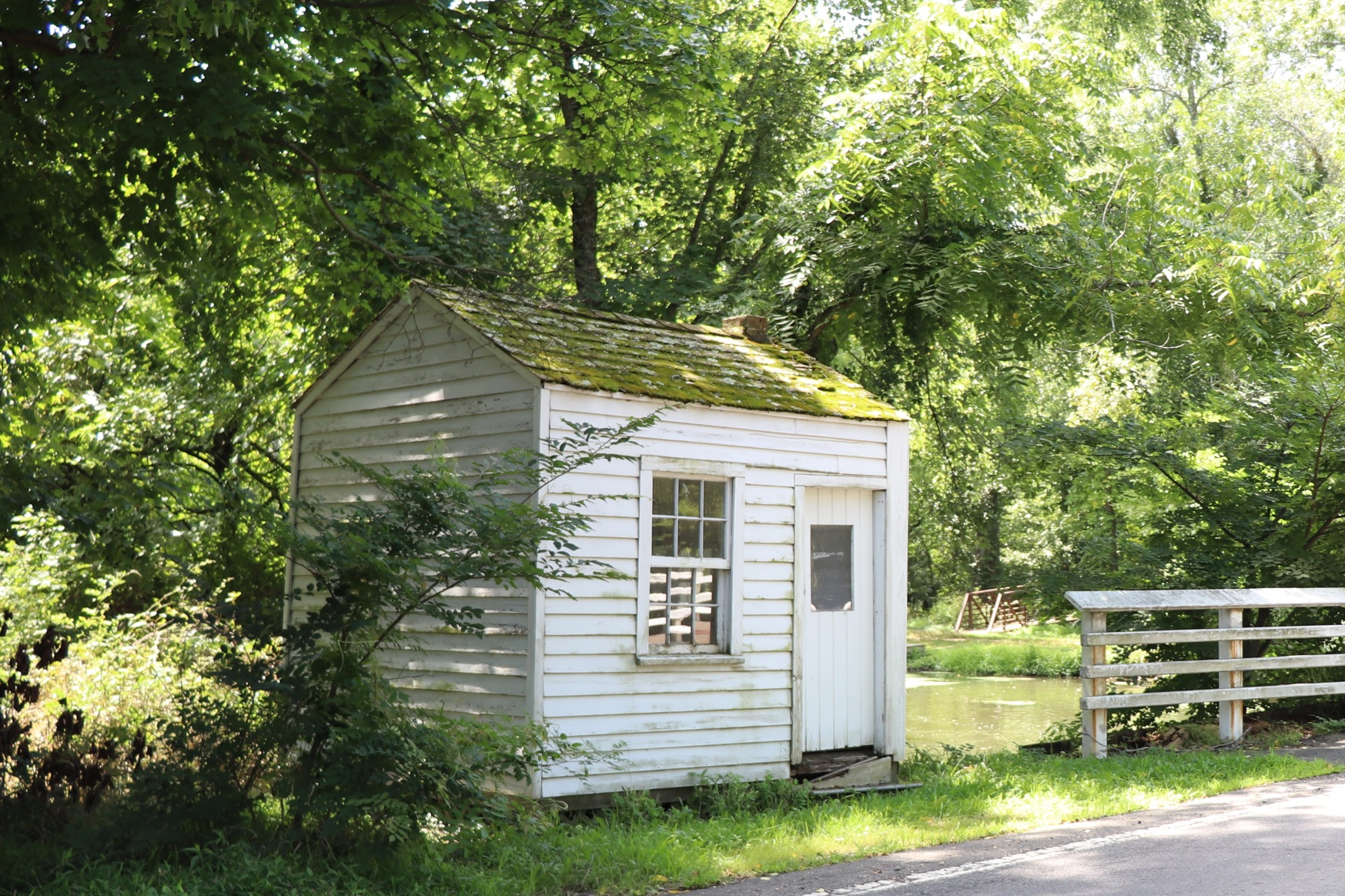
Bridge Tender’s Station

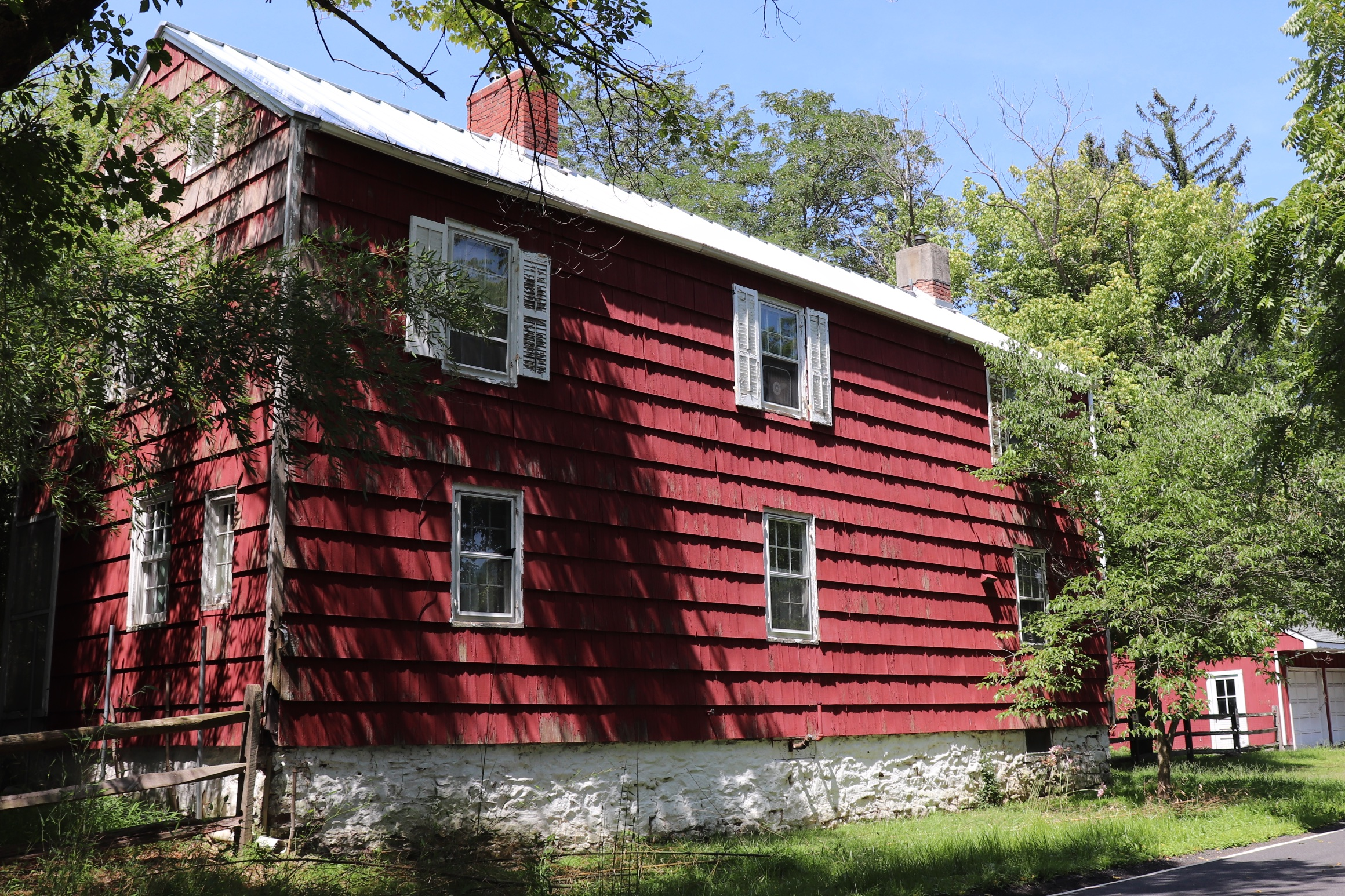
Lock Tender's House

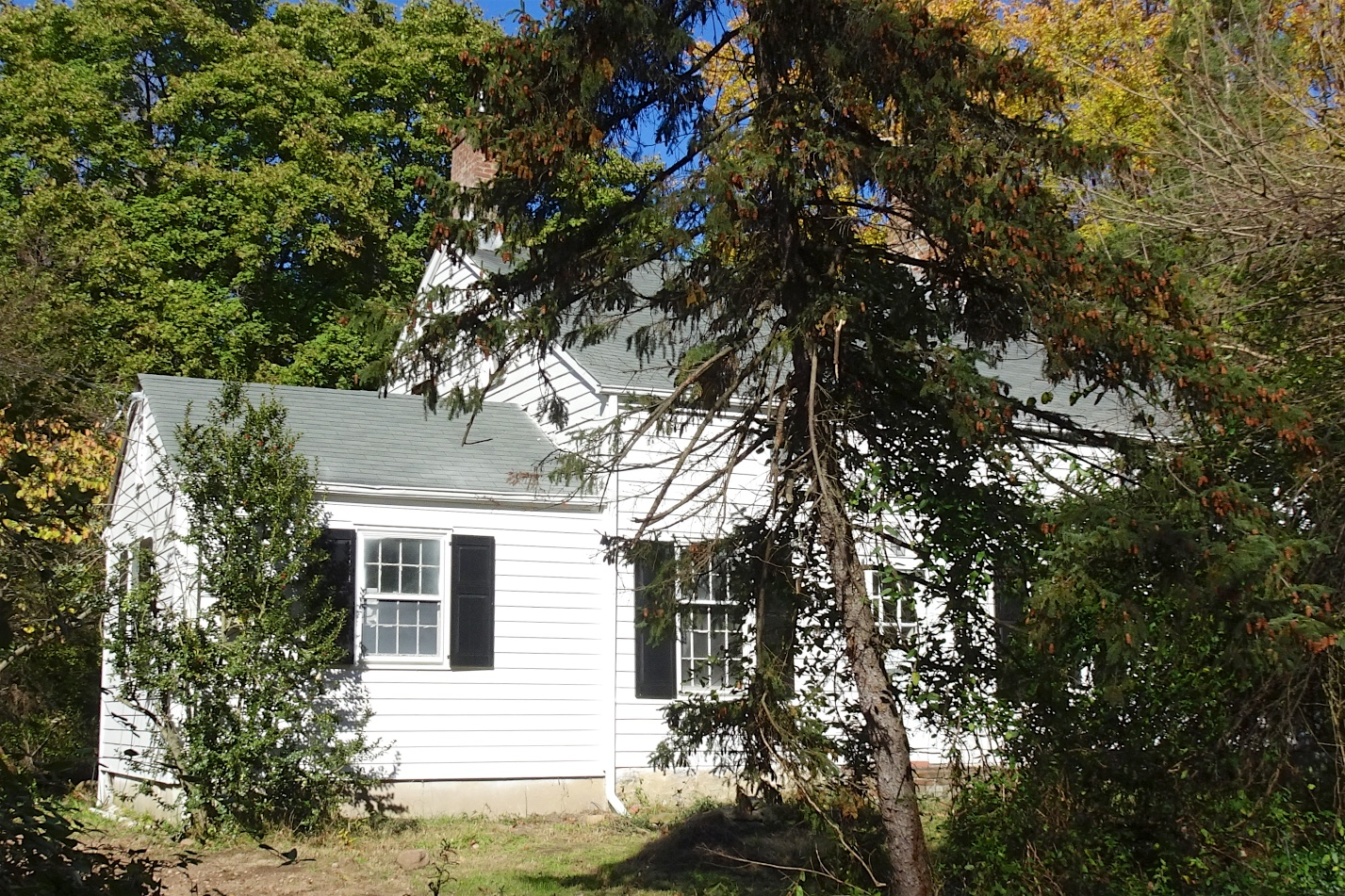
John Honeyman House

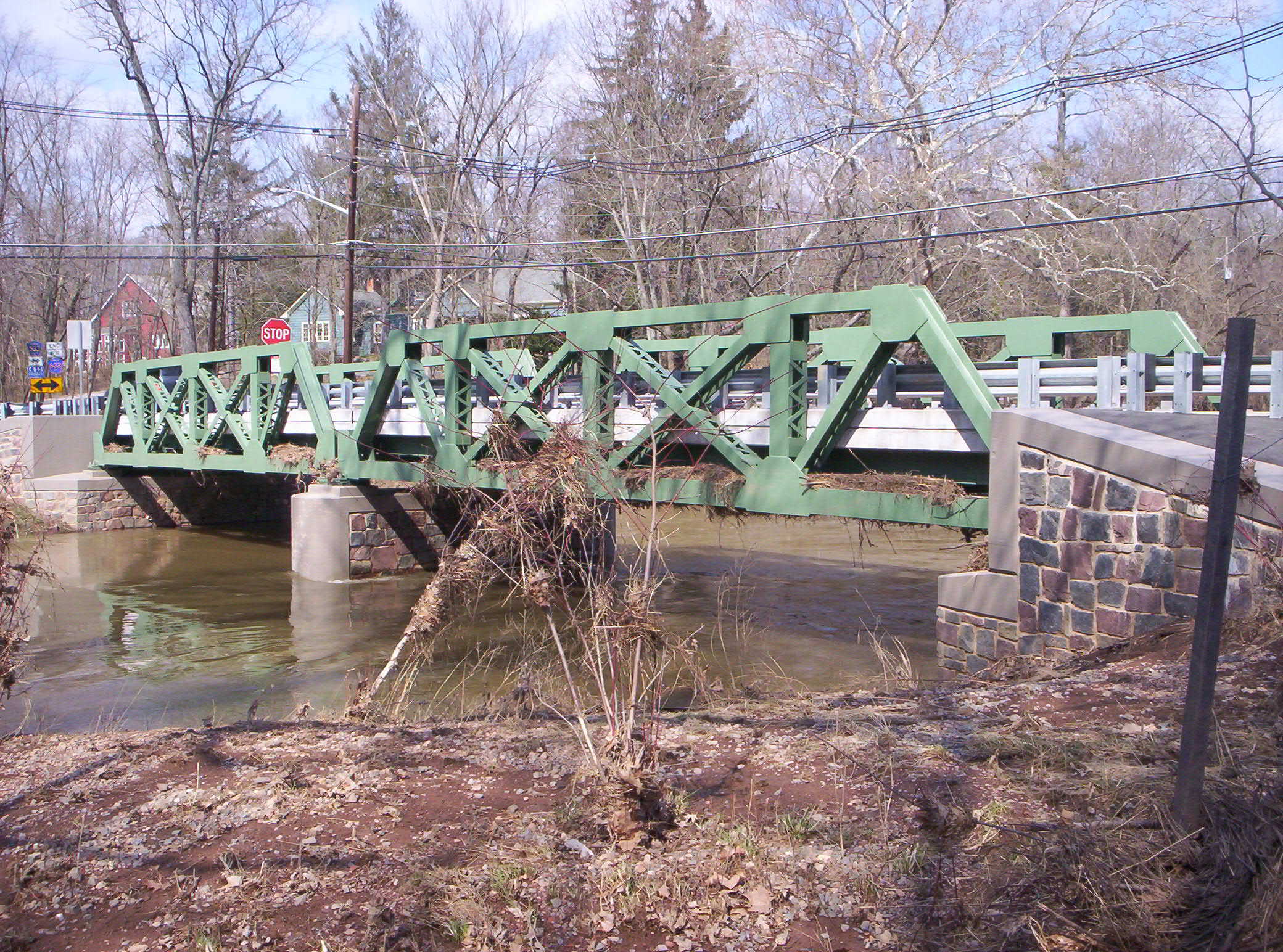
The Griggstown Causeway over the Millstone River

== See also ==
- National Register of Historic Places listings in Somerset County, New Jersey
