= Griggstown Quail Farm =

New Jersey producer of game birds

Coordinates: 40°26′35″N 74°36′06″W

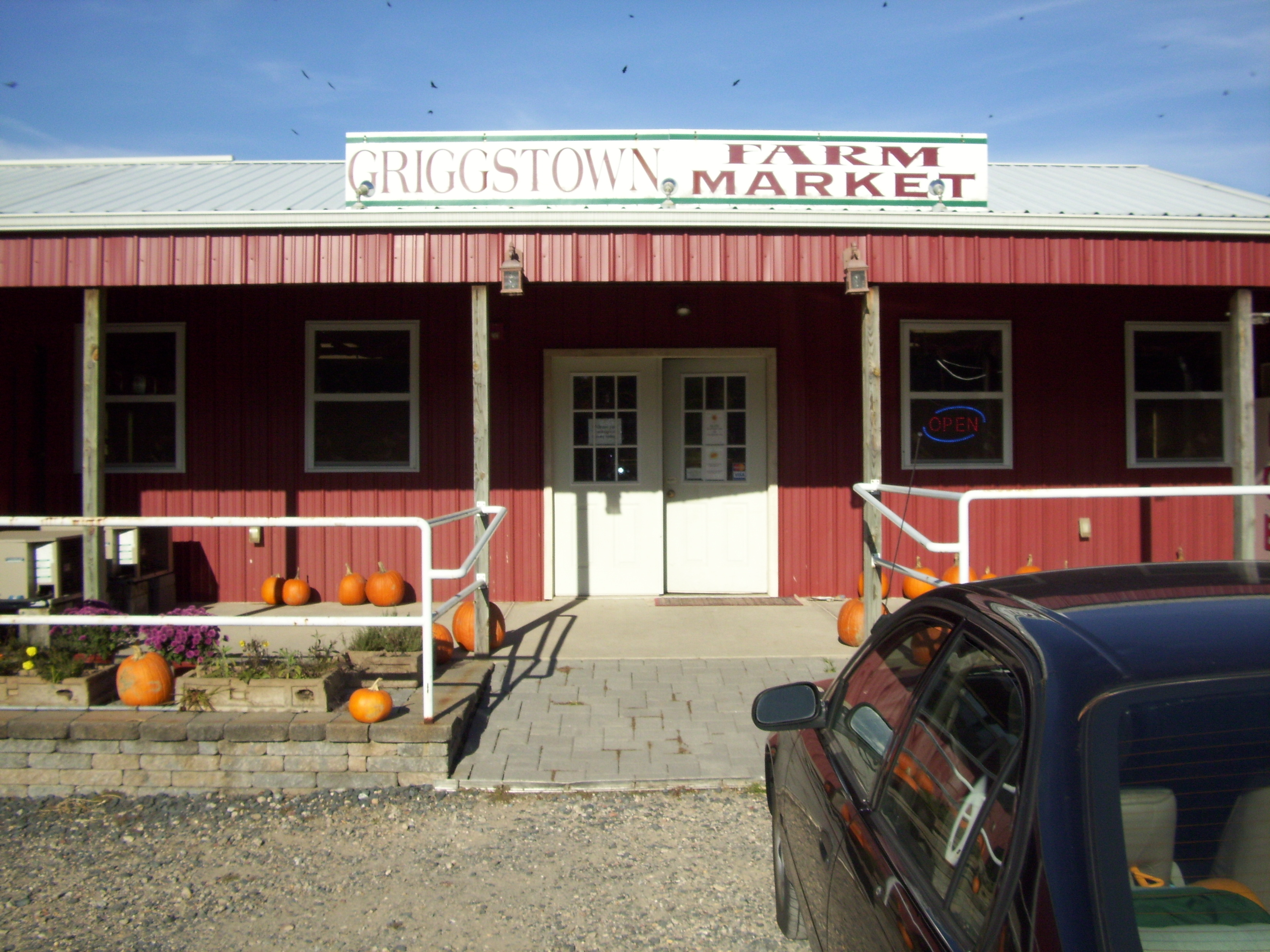

Griggstown Quail Farm is a New Jersey producer of game birds that is run by George Rude. It was the winner of Edible Communities' New Jersey Farm local hero award in 2010.

== History ==
It is located in the Griggstown section of Franklin Township, Somerset County, New Jersey, and was started in 1973 by George Rude with twelve quail on 2 acres (8,100 m^{2}). At that time the farm was owned by Peter Josten. George purchased the land from Josten in 1992, the Griggstown Quail Farm grew to over 75 acres (300,000 m^{2}) of land. In 2007 the farm had about 35,000 pheasants, 70,000 quail, and 150,000 chickens. In season they raise Mallard duck, Muscovy duck, Bourbon Red turkey, and partridge. All the birds are free-range.

The birds are sold to D'Artagnan, Inc., in Newark, New Jersey. In addition, a number of other distributors and restaurants carry poultry raised on the farm. Distributors in New York include Cittarella Market and Ottomanelli Sons, as well as a number of New York City restaurants such as, North End Grill, Lutèce and The Four Seasons. New Jersey restaurants that use the poultry include The Bernards Inn, the former Ryland Inn, Mediterra, Tre Piani, elements, ShipWreck Point, Brothers Moon, Anton's at the Swan, Circa and the Lawrenceville Inn.

Adam Brod of Mount Laurel, NJ is the Executive Chef.
