= Wissinoming station =

Railway station in Philadelphia

Wissinoming
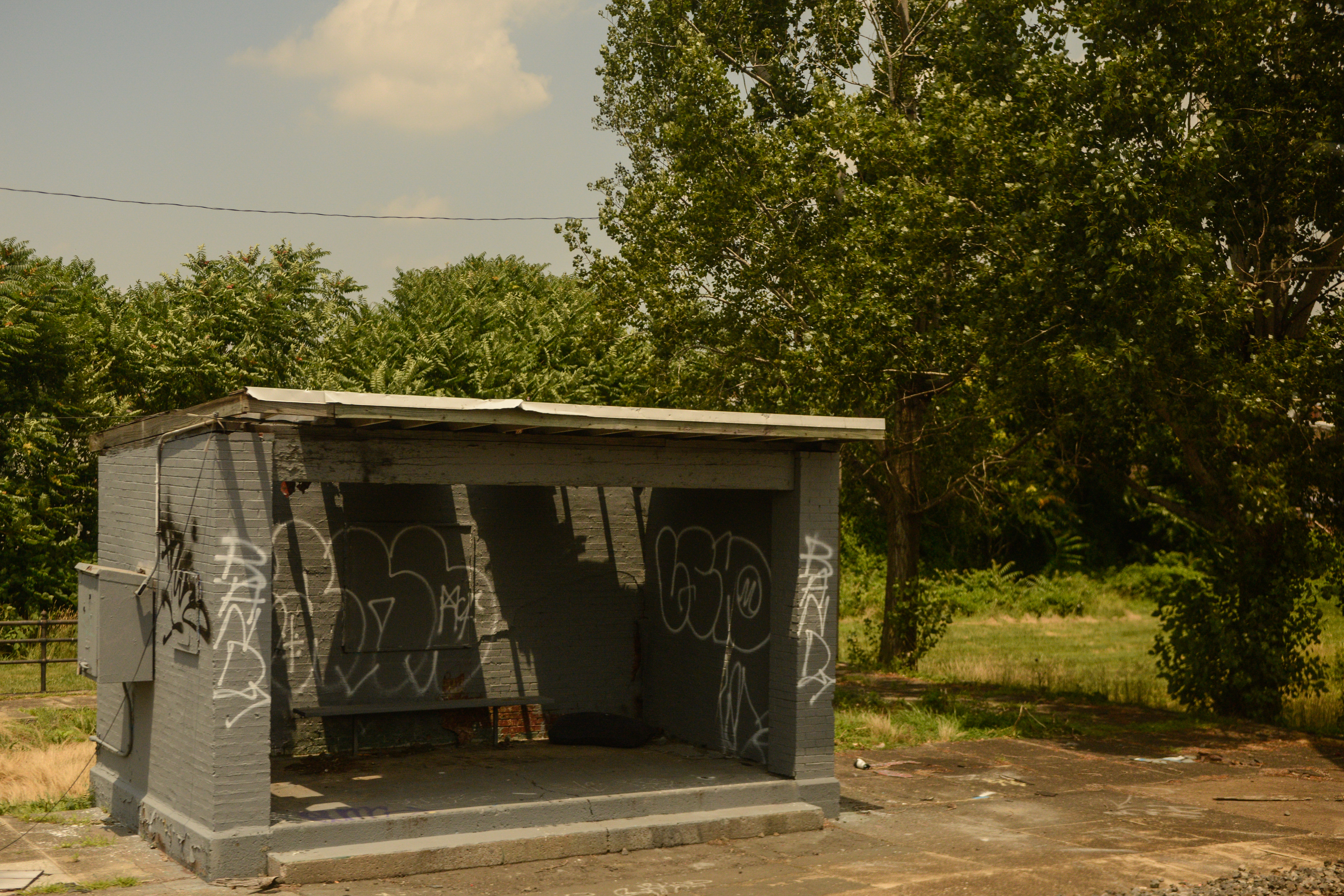
- The abandoned station shelter in 2014

General information
- Location: Comly Street east of Keystone Street; Wissinoming, Philadelphia, Pennsylvania
- Coordinates: 40°00′53″N 75°03′22″W
- Line: Amtrak Northeast Corridor
- Platforms: 2
- Tracks: 4

History
- Closed: November 9, 2003
- Electrified: June 29, 1930

Former services
| Preceding station | SEPTA | Following station |
|---|---|---|
| Bridesburg toward Temple University | Trenton Line | Tacony toward Trenton |
| Preceding station | Pennsylvania Railroad | Following station |
| Bridesburg toward Suburban Station | Trenton Line | Tacony toward Trenton |
| Fitler's toward Suburban Station | Trenton Line | Unruh Street toward Trenton |
Location

Wissinoming was a SEPTA Regional Rail station in Philadelphia, Pennsylvania. Located on Amtrak's Northeast Corridor, it was served by Trenton Line commuter trains. It was located off Comly Street in the neighborhood of Wissinoming.

SEPTA discontinued service to Wissinoming on November 9, 2003, citing low ridership; 25 people were boarding at the station every day. SEPTA had previously attempted to close the station in 1994, but a strong response from the Wissinoming Civic Association won the station a reprieve.
