= Bridesburg station =

Railway station in Philadelphia

Bridesburg
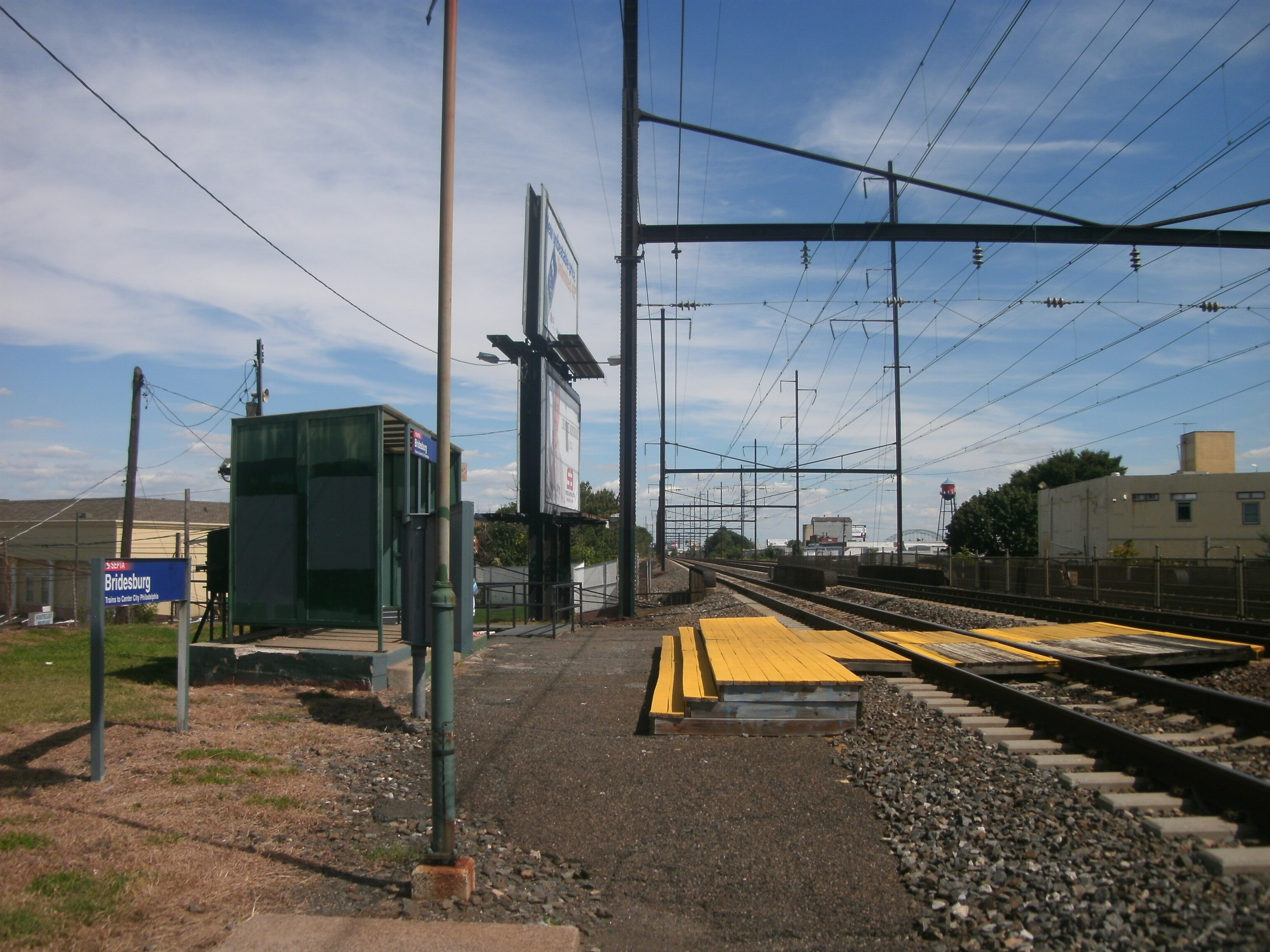
- Bridesburg station, seen facing towards Tacony on the Center City-bound platform in September 2012

General information
- Location: 2202 Bridge Street; Philadelphia, Pennsylvania
- Coordinates: 40°00′39″N 75°04′12″W
- Owner: Southeastern Pennsylvania Transportation Authority
- Line: Amtrak Northeast Corridor
- Platforms: 2 side platforms
- Tracks: 5
- Connections: SEPTA City Bus: 73, 84

Construction
- Accessible: No

Other information
- Fare zone: 2

History
- Electrified: June 29, 1930

Services
Preceding station	SEPTA	Following station
North Philadelphia toward Temple University	Trenton Line	Tacony toward Trenton
Former services
Preceding station	Pennsylvania Railroad	Following station
Frankford toward Chicago	Main Line	Tacony toward New York or Exchange Place
Frankford toward Suburban Station	Trenton Line	Fitler's toward Trenton
Preceding station	SEPTA	Following station
Frankford Junction Closed 1992 toward Temple University	Trenton Line	Wissinoming Closed 2003 toward Trenton
Location

Bridesburg station is a SEPTA Regional Rail station in Philadelphia, Pennsylvania. Located at Bridge Street and Harbison Avenue in the Bridesburg neighborhood of Northeast Philadelphia, it serves the Trenton Line.

The station is located along the Northeast Corridor, owned by Amtrak. It is 10.2 miles (16.4 km) from Suburban Station. In 2005, this station saw 162 boardings on an average weekday. Amtrak trains do not stop at this station.

== Station layout ==
A walkway over the freight track allows passengers to board and alight Trenton-bound trains from the outer passenger service track.
