= Passenger Rail Investment and Improvement Act of 2008 =

The Passenger Rail Investment and Improvement Act of 2008 (originally H.R. 6003, passed as division B of Pub. L. 110–432 (text) (PDF)) is a law that reauthorized Amtrak and authorized the United States Department of Transportation to provide grants for operating costs and capital expenses and to repay Amtrak's long-term debt and capital leases. It required Amtrak to adopt cost and performance metrics with regard to its intercity trains and established the Northeast Corridor Commission to govern Amtrak’s shared services along the Northeast Corridor.

== Background ==
The National Railroad Passenger Corporation was established in 1970 by the Rail Passenger Service Act in order to maintain passenger rail service in the United States. Since its inception, Amtrak has remained unprofitable and requires an annual subsidy from Congress in order to maintain service and make critical capital improvements. In 2006, the Office of Inspector General for the Department of Transportation estimated that Amtrak would require $2 billion annually in order to maintain a state of good repair or $1.4 billion annually in order to prevent further deterioration of the infrastructure. Amtrak's annual funding from 2003 to 2007 was about $1.3 billion. Amtrak fired David Gunn as president in 2006 and hired Alex Kummant in his place. Kummant saw growth opportunities on routes from 300 to 500 miles and sought to restructure the route network in favor of these routes. Rep. James Oberstar sponsored the legislation as Division B of the Rail Safety Improvement Act of 2008 and President George W. Bush signed the act into law on October 16, 2008.

== Provisions ==
=== Financial ===
The law required Amtrak to develop a modern financial and accounting reporting system and to submit a five-year financial plan and budget to the Inspector General. It authorizes Amtrak to restructure its long-term debt and leases by negotiating with holders of that debt.

=== Service ===
Amtrak must work with the Surface Transportation Board to develop metrics and standards for performance of intercity service. The STB is also authorized to award damages to Amtrak in cases where freight railroads, on whose tracks Amtrak operates, do not provide preference to Amtrak traffic which may result in significant delays. Under Section 212 of the law, the Surface Transportation Board was permitted to appoint an arbitrator to settle disputes in certain cases.

Amtrak is required to rank the performance of its long-distance routes and develop performance improvement plans for those routes that underperform.

=== State-supported routes ===
Amtrak is required to develop a methodology for allocation of costs on such routes and allocate costs appropriately to those states. States may select a different provider for those services and may agree with Amtrak on the usage of its facilities for those providers.

=== Northeast Corridor ===
Section 212 created the Northeast Corridor Commission and mandated the Commuter and Intercity Rail Cost Allocation Policy which provides for a methodology of allocating costs to all users along the Northeast Corridor including commuter rail service.

=== Capital assistance ===
The DOT is authorized to make grants to states for the benefit of intercity passenger rail service. Funds may also be authorized to establish a program for development of high-speed rail corridors.

== Legal actions ==
In 2011, the Association of American Railroads filed a federal lawsuit seeking to invalidate the terms of Section 212 as unconstitutional. The AAR claimed that the law gave a private party the ability to regulate the conduct of another private party. In 2015, United States Supreme Court ruled that Amtrak was effectively a government entity and remanded the case back to the District Court. In 2016, the court voided the metrics published by Amtrak and the Federal Railroad Administration in May 2010. In 2017, the District Court ruled that the arbitration provision of the law was unconstitutional, but severed that provision from Section 212, allowing the remainder of the section to take effect.

Amtrak filed suit against SEPTA to force an increase in rent of land adjacent to its tracks along the Northeast Corridor that SEPTA uses for SEPTA Regional Rail stations and parking lots.

In 2016, Amtrak, citing Section 212, demanded that the Massachusetts Bay Transportation Authority pay $30 million for Amtrak’s costs in servicing the Attleboro Line, which is owned by MBTA. MBTA citing an existing agreement in which Amtrak was permitted to use the line for its trains and agreed to maintain the line at no cost. In a settlement, Amtrak and MBTA agreed to share costs along the Attleboro line and Amtrak would continue to allow the use South Station with cost sharing for use of the facility.
