= Tacony station =

Rail station in Philadelphia

Tacony
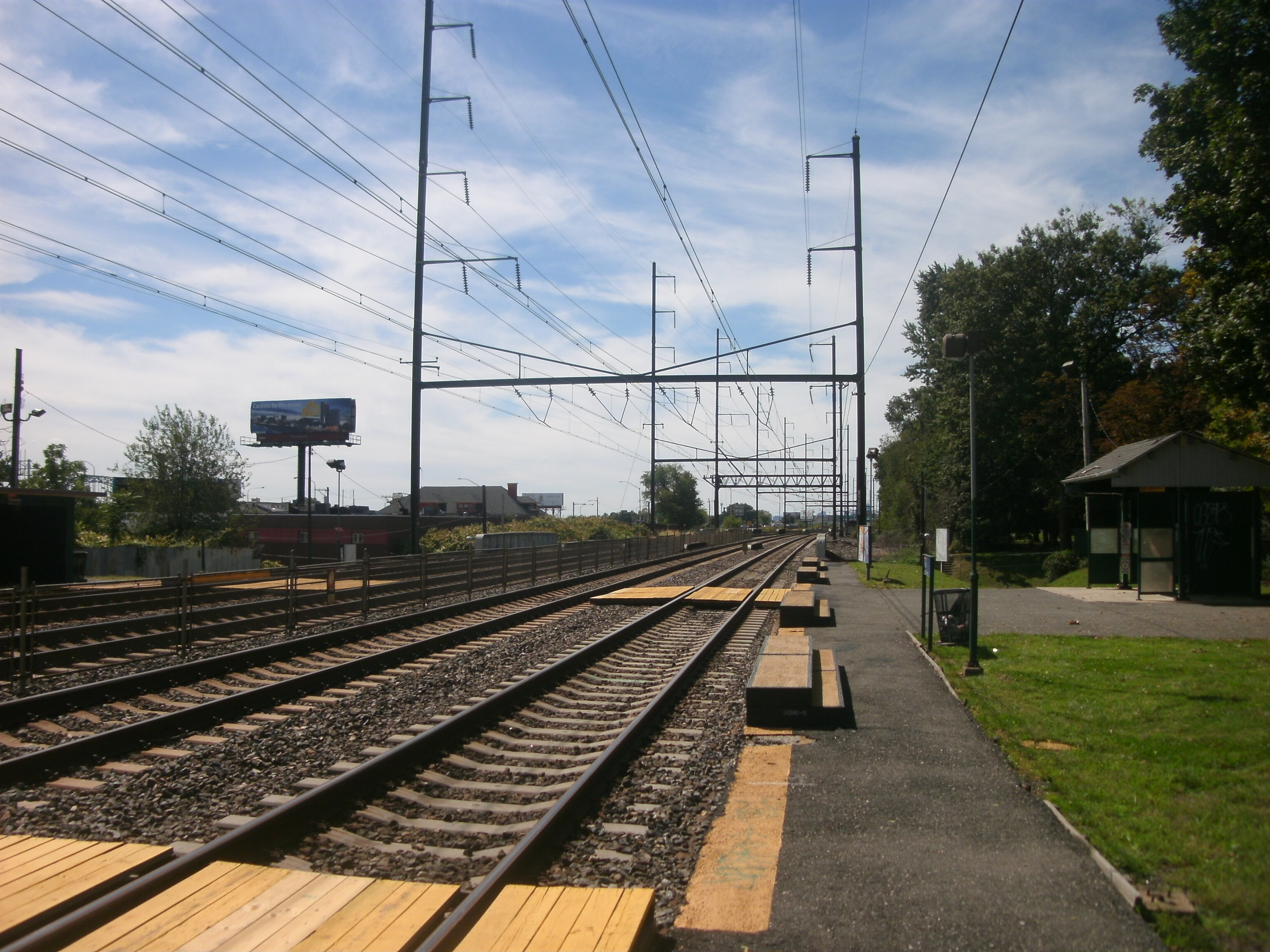
- Tacony station as seen in September 2012

General information
- Location: 4938 Disston Street; Philadelphia, Pennsylvania
- Coordinates: 40°01′24″N 75°02′20″W
- Owner: Southeastern Pennsylvania Transportation Authority
- Line: Amtrak Northeast Corridor
- Platforms: 2 side platforms
- Tracks: 5

Construction
- Cycle facilities: 4 rack spaces
- Accessible: No

Other information
- Fare zone: 2

History
- Electrified: June 29, 1930

Services
| Preceding station | SEPTA | Following station |
|---|---|---|
| Bridesburg toward Temple University | Trenton Line | Holmesburg Junction toward Trenton |
Former services
| Preceding station | Pennsylvania Railroad | Following station |
|---|---|---|
| Bridesburg toward Chicago | Main Line | Holmesburg Junction toward New York or Exchange Place |
| Unruh Street toward Suburban Station | Trenton Line | Holmesburg Junction toward Trenton |
| Preceding station | SEPTA | Following station |
| Wissinoming Closed 2003 toward Temple University | Trenton Line | Holmesburg Junction toward Trenton |
Location

Tacony station is a SEPTA Regional Rail station in Philadelphia, Pennsylvania. Located at Disston and Keystone Streets in the Tacony neighborhood of Northeast Philadelphia, it serves the Trenton Line. The station is located along the Northeast Corridor, owned by Amtrak. It is 12.1 miles (19.5 km) from Suburban Station. In 2004, this station saw 131 boardings on an average weekday. Amtrak trains do not stop at this station.

An electrical storm with heavy winds on March 27, 1911 knocked over the station at Tacony along with the railroad tower at Holmesburg Junction. Much of the neighborhood was also wiped out, with the police station leveled along with several houses. The demolition of the railroad station killed an unidentified man in the depot.

== Station layout ==
A walkway over the freight track allows passengers to board and alight Trenton-bound trains from the outer passenger service track.
