= Torresdale station =

Railway station in Philadelphia, Pennsylvania

Torresdale
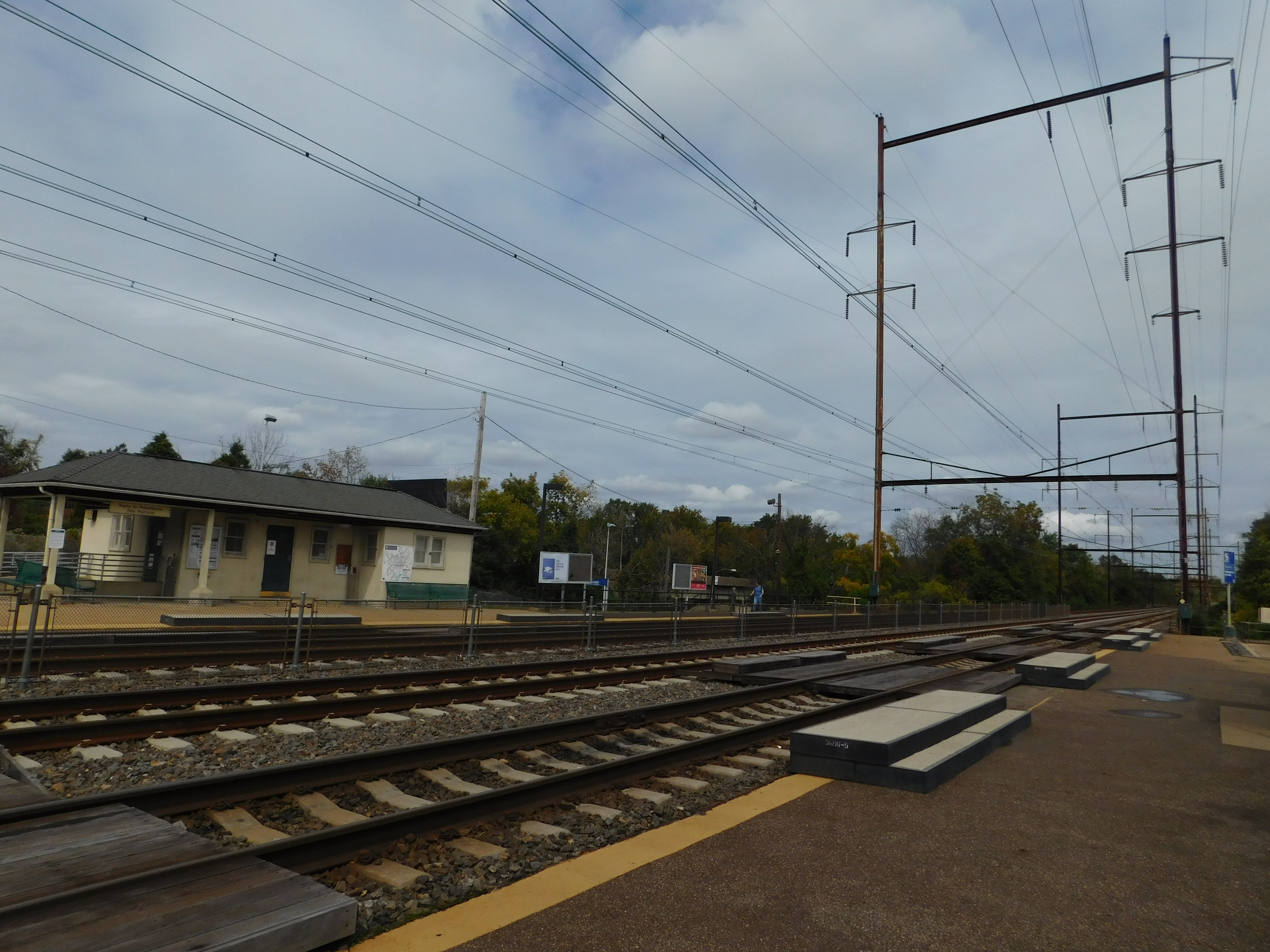
- Torresdale station as seen in September 2020 from the Trenton-bound platform

General information
- Location: 9648 James Street; Philadelphia, Pennsylvania
- Coordinates: 40°03′16″N 74°59′05″W
- Owner: Southeastern Pennsylvania Transportation Authority
- Line: Amtrak Northeast Corridor
- Platforms: 2 side platforms
- Tracks: 4
- Connections: SEPTA City Bus: 19, 84

Construction
- Parking: 331 spaces
- Cycle facilities: 6 rack spaces
- Accessible: No

Other information
- Fare zone: 3

History
- Electrified: June 29, 1930

Passengers
- 2017: 1,227 boardings, 833 alightings (weekday average)
- Rank: 11 of 146

Services
Preceding station	SEPTA	Following station
Holmesburg Junction toward Temple University	Trenton Line	Cornwells Heights toward Trenton
Former services
Preceding station	Pennsylvania Railroad	Following station
Holmesburg Junction toward Chicago	Main Line	Cornwells Heights toward New York or Exchange Place
Holmesburg Junction toward Suburban Station	Trenton Line	Andalusia toward Trenton
Location

Torresdale station is a SEPTA Regional Rail station in Philadelphia, Pennsylvania. Located at Grant Avenue and James Street in the Torresdale neighborhood of Northeast Philadelphia, it serves the Trenton Line.

The station is located along the Northeast Corridor, owned by Amtrak. It is 14.8 miles (23.8 km) from Suburban Station. In 2017, this station saw 1,160 boardings on an average weekday. Amtrak does not stop at this station.
