= Holmesburg Junction station =

Railway station in Philadelphia

Holmesburg Junction
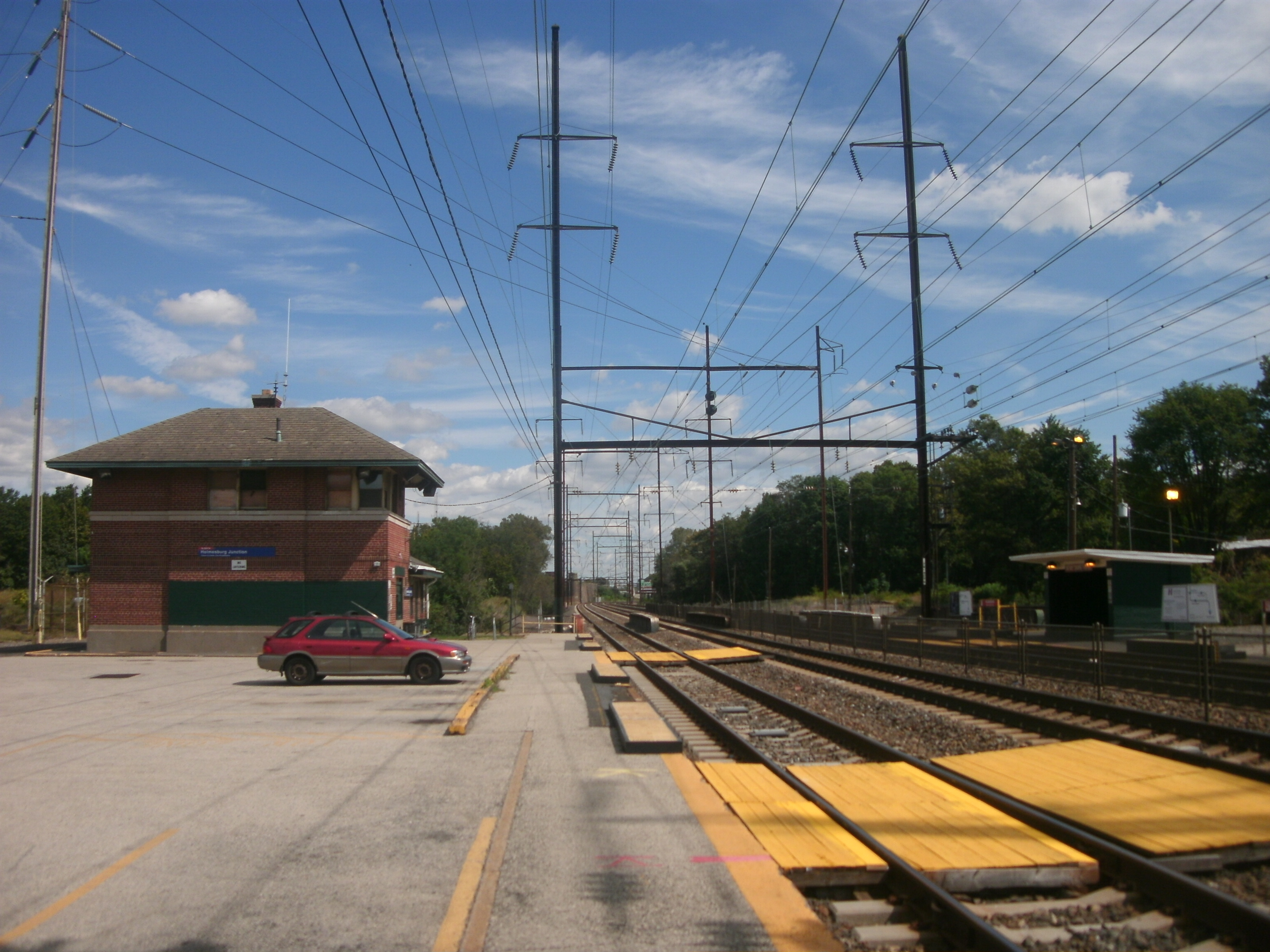
- Holmesburg Junction station as seen from the Center City-bound platform facing towards Torresdale and the junction tower in September 2012

General information
- Location: 4783 Rhawn Street; Philadelphia, Pennsylvania
- Coordinates: 40°01′58″N 75°01′26″W
- Owner: Southeastern Pennsylvania Transportation Authority
- Line: Amtrak Northeast Corridor
- Platforms: 2 side platforms
- Tracks: 4
- Connections: SEPTA City Bus: 28, 84

Construction
- Parking: 154 spaces
- Cycle facilities: 4 rack spaces
- Accessible: No

Other information
- Fare zone: 2

History
- Electrified: June 29, 1930

Passengers
- 2017: 471 boardings, 441 alightings (weekday average)
- Rank: 54 of 146

Services
Preceding station	SEPTA	Following station
Tacony toward Temple University	Trenton Line	Torresdale toward Trenton
Former services
Preceding station	Pennsylvania Railroad	Following station
Tacony toward Chicago	Main Line	Torresdale toward New York or Exchange Place
Tacony toward Suburban Station	Trenton Line	Liddonfield toward Trenton
Terminus	Bustleton Branch	Holmesburg toward Bustleton
Location

Holmesburg Junction station is a SEPTA Regional Rail station in Philadelphia, Pennsylvania. Located at Rhawn and Decatur Streets in the Holmesburg neighborhood of Northeast Philadelphia, it serves the Trenton Line.

The station is located along the Northeast Corridor, owned by Amtrak. It is 13.1 miles (21.1 km) from Suburban Station. In 2017, this station saw 471 boardings and 248 alightings on an average weekday.

The original junction tower at Holmesburg Junction was blown down in an electrical storm on March 27, 1911. The storm also leveled the station depot at Tacony. At Holmesburg Junction the Bustleton Branch splits from the main tracks and runs to the interior of Northeast Philadelphia. Passenger service on the Bustleton Branch ended on February 13, 1926.
