= Northeast Corridor Commission =

US federal entity charged with Boston-Washington rail

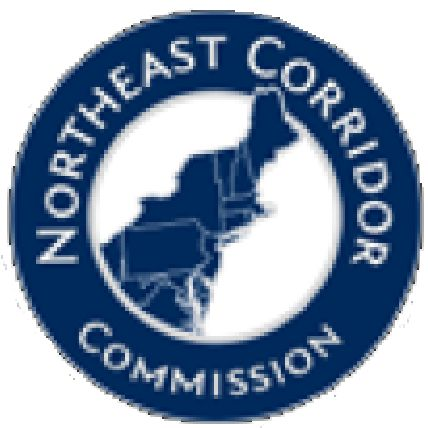

Commission overview
- Formed: 2010
- Headquarters: Washington, D.C. 38°53′57″N 77°0′29″W
- Commission executives: Garrett Eucalitto, Commissioner, Connecticut Department of Transportation, Commission Co-Chair; David Fink, Administrator, Federal Railroad Administration, Commission Co-Chair
- Website: nec-commission.com

Congress established the Northeast Corridor Commission (the Commission) under Sec. 212 of Public Law 110-432 (Passenger Rail Investment and Improvement Act of 2008) to promote mutual cooperation and planning among owners and operators on the Northeast Corridor (NEC) rail line and to advise the U.S. Congress on Corridor policy and investment needs.

== Description ==
The Commission consists of one member from each of the NEC states and the District of Columbia; four members from Amtrak; and five members from the U.S. Department of Transportation (USDOT). It includes non-voting representatives from freight railroads, states with connecting corridors, and commuter authorities not directly represented by a Commission member.

The Commission approved a Northeast Corridor Commuter and Intercity Rail Cost Allocation Policy (the Policy) in 2015 as a first step towards establishing a new framework for regional cooperation. The Policy employs consistent and transparent methods for sharing approximately $1.8 billion in annual operating and baseline capital costs among infrastructure owners and service operators. The Policy also calls for a collaborative capital planning process among stakeholders, train performance and capital program delivery reporting requirements, and a federal-state funding partnership to eliminate the state-of-good-repair backlog and address improvement needs not funded through the Policy.

Congressional passage of the FAST Act in December 2015 represented a notable step forward for the NEC. In recognition of the initial Cost Allocation Policy, Congress created the Federal-State-Partnership for State of Good Repair (FSP) program in the FAST Act to reduce the corridor's state of good repair backlog. It marked the first time that intercity passenger rail was addressed in a multi-year authorization alongside other surface transportation programs. It also codified many Policy requirements aimed at increasing collaboration, transparency, and accountability for all NEC stakeholders, including the production of an annual five-year NEC Capital Investment Plan, a 15-year Service and Infrastructure Development Plan, and an Annual Report on Infrastructure and Operations.

Nearly a decade after the FAST Act, Congress passed the Infrastructure Investment and Jobs Act (IIJA), also known as the Bipartisan Infrastructure Law. This was a breakthrough for the NEC as—for the first time—it provided dedicated multi-year funding for some of the nation's largest and most critical railroad infrastructure projects. As of late 2024, the Fed-State Partnership Program, funded by IIJA, has awarded nearly $18 billion to critical state-of-good-repair, major backlog, and improvement infrastructure projects along the NEC.

== Members ==
The Commission has five voting members from USDOT, four from Amtrak, and one each from the eight NEC states and the District of Columbia. Non-voting members include the NEC feeder states, freight railroads, and independent commuter authorities.

NEC States:

- Massachusetts Department of Transportation
- Rhode Island Department of Transportation
- Connecticut Department of Transportation
- New York Metropolitan Transportation Authority
- NJ Transit
- Pennsylvania Department of Transportation
- Delaware Department of Transportation
- Maryland Department of Transportation
- District of Columbia Department of Transportation

U.S. Department of Transportation:

- 5 members, including:
  - Federal Railroad Administration
  - Federal Transit Administration
  - Office of the Secretary, U.S. Department of Transportation

Amtrak:

- 4 members
