= Northeast Corridor =

Railroad corridor in the Northeastern United States

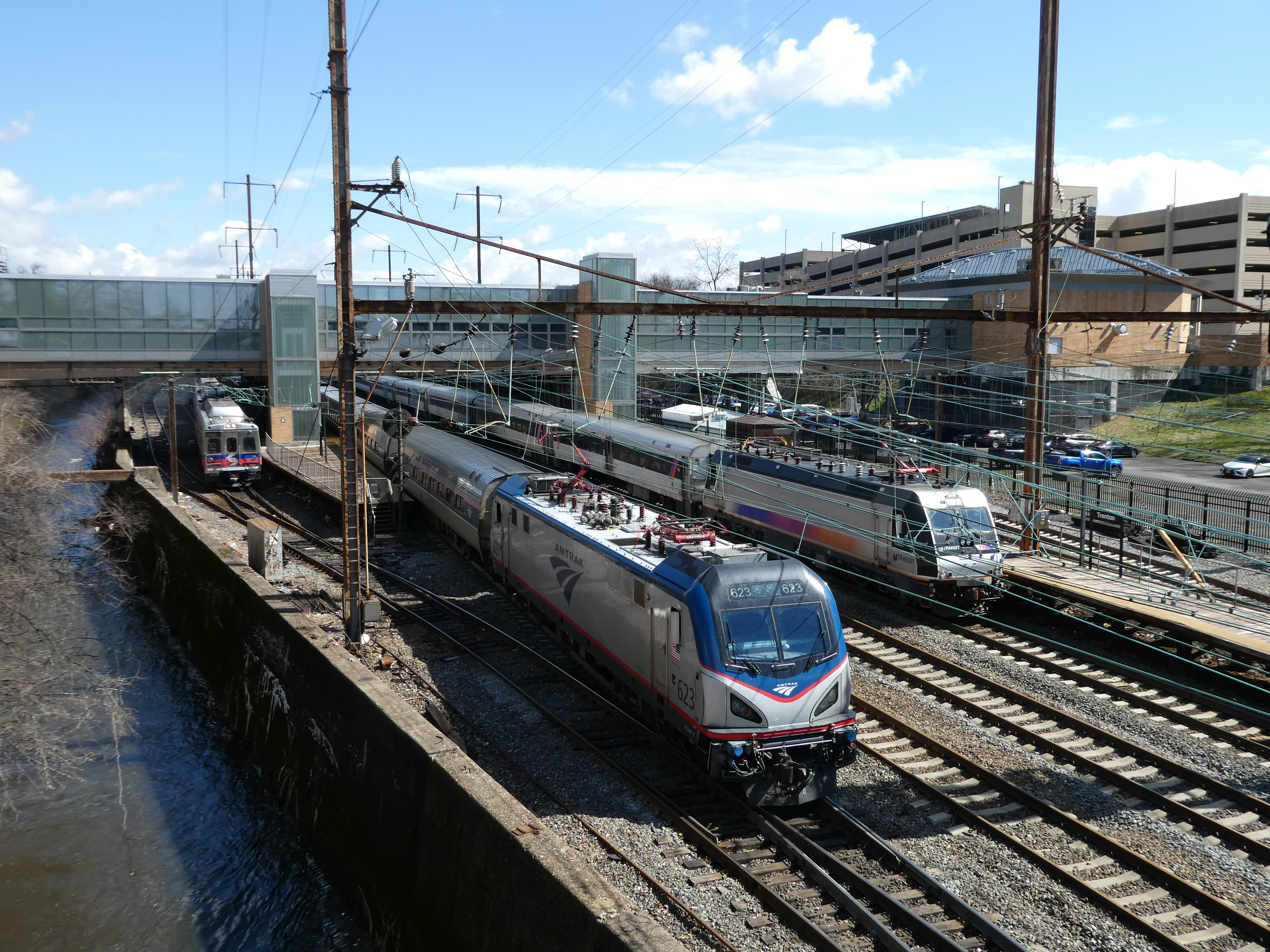
- Amtrak, NJT, and SEPTA trains at Trenton Transit Center in New Jersey

Overview
- Owner: Massachusetts Department of Transportation (Boston–MA/RI border); Amtrak (MA/RI border–New Haven); Connecticut Department of Transportation (New Haven–CT/NY border); Metro-North Railroad (CT/NY border–New Rochelle); Amtrak (New Rochelle–Washington)
- Locale: Northeast megalopolis
- Termini: Boston, Massachusetts; Washington, D.C.
- Stations: 108 (30 Amtrak stations, 78 commuter-rail-only stations)
- Website: nec-commission.com

Service
- Type: High-speed rail; Higher-speed rail; Inter-city rail; Commuter rail
- System: Amtrak; CSX Transportation; Norfolk Southern Railway; Providence and Worcester Railroad
- Operator(s): Amtrak, MBTA (operated by Keolis), CT Rail, Metro-North Railroad, Long Island Rail Road, NJ Transit, SEPTA, MARC
- Ridership: 15,173,228 (Amtrak only, FY 25) ▲8.1% (Note: Amtrak's Fiscal Year (FY) runs from October 1 of the prior year to September 30 of the named year.)

History
- Opened: 1834 (first section); 1917 (final section)

Technical
- Line length: 457 mi (735 km)
- Num of tracks: 2–6
- Track gauge: 4 ft 8 1/2 in (1,435 mm) standard gauge
- Electrification: Overhead line: 25 kV AC at 60 Hz (Boston–New Haven); 12.5 kV AC at 60 Hz (New Haven–New York); 12 kV AC at 25 Hz (New York–Washington)

The Northeast Corridor (NEC) is an electrified railroad line in the Northeast megalopolis of the United States. Owned primarily by Amtrak, it runs from Boston in the north to Washington, D.C., in the south, with major stops in Providence, New Haven, Stamford, New York City, Newark, Trenton, Philadelphia, Wilmington, and Baltimore. The NEC is roughly paralleled by Interstate 95 for most of its length. The NEC is the busiest passenger rail line in the United States by both ridership and frequency, with more than 2,200 trains a day running over at least some portion of the line.

The corridor is used by many Amtrak trains, including the high-speed Acela (formerly Acela Express), intercity trains, and several long-distance trains. Most of the corridor also has frequent commuter rail service, provided by the MBTA, CT Rail, Metro-North Railroad, Long Island Rail Road, New Jersey Transit, SEPTA, and MARC. While large through freights have not run on the NEC since the early 1980s, some sections still carry smaller local freights operated by CSX, Norfolk Southern, CSAO, Providence and Worcester, New York and Atlantic, and Canadian Pacific. CSX and NS partly own their routes.

Long-distance Amtrak services that use the Northeast Corridor include the Cardinal, Crescent, and Silver Meteor trains, which reach 125 mph (201 km/h), as well as its Acela trains, which reach 150–160 mph (240–260 km/h) in parts of Massachusetts, Rhode Island, and New Jersey. Some express trains operated by MARC that reach 125 mph (201 km/h) also operate on the Northeast Corridor. Acela can travel the 225 mi (362 km) between New York City and Washington, D.C., in under three hours, and the 229 mi (369 km) between New York and Boston in under 3.5 hours.

In 2012, Amtrak proposed improvements to enable "true" high-speed rail on the corridor, which would have roughly halved travel times at an estimated cost of $151 billion.

== History ==
=== Origins ===
Sections owned by Amtrak are in red; sections with commuter service are highlighted in blue.

Most of what is now called the Northeast Corridor was built, piece by piece, by several railroads constructed as early as the 1830s. Before 1900, their routes had been consolidated as two long and unconnected stretches, each of them a part of a major railroad. Anchored in Washington, D.C., the stretch owned by the Pennsylvania Railroad, approached New York City from the south. Anchored at Boston, the stretch owned by the New Haven Railroad entered New York State from Connecticut. The former terminated at New Jersey ferry slips across the Hudson River from Manhattan Island. The latter extended to the Bronx, where it continued into Manhattan via trackage rights on the New York and Harlem Railroad. It also reached the Bronx via the Harlem River and Port Chester Railroad, which extended to the Bronx from the New Haven at New Rochelle.

From 1903 to 1917, the two railroads undertook a number of projects that connected their lines and completed, in effect, the Northeast Corridor. These included the New York Tunnel Extension, which extended from New Jersey to Long Island (and was composed of the Manhattan Transfer station, the North River Tunnels, a new Pennsylvania Station, the East River Tunnels), the New York Connecting Railroad, and the Hell Gate Bridge. Combined, these constituted a stretch that started just outside of Newark, New Jersey, on the Pennsylvania Railroad side, and connected with the Harlem River and Port Chester Railroad (and thus New Rochelle) on the New Haven side. With the opening of the Hell Gate Bridge in 1917, this final connecting stretch, and thus the Northeast Corridor itself, was complete.

With the 1968 creation of Penn Central, which was a combination of those two railroads and the New York Central Railroad, the entire corridor was under the control of a single entity for the first time. After successor Penn Central’s 1970 bankruptcy, the corridor was almost entirely subsumed by the subsequently-created Amtrak through the Regional Rail Reorganization Act of 1973 and the Railroad Revitalization and Regulatory Reform Act of 1976, although Amtrak ran trains as early as 1971.

==== Boston–The Bronx (New Haven Railroad) ====
- Boston–Providence: Boston and Providence Railroad opened 1835, partially realigned in 1847 and in 1899. Became part of the Old Colony Railroad in 1888.
- Providence–Stonington: New York, Providence and Boston Railroad opened 1837; partially realigned 1848.
- Stonington–New Haven: New Haven, New London and Stonington Railroad opened 1852–1889, realigned in New Haven, 1894.
- New Haven–New Rochelle: New York and New Haven Railroad opened 1849.
- New Rochelle–Port Morris (Bronx): Harlem River and Port Chester Railroad opened 1873.

==== Newark–Washington, D.C. (Pennsylvania Railroad) ====
- Newark–Trenton: United New Jersey Railroad and Canal Company opened 1834–1839, 1841; partially realigned 1863 and 1870.
- Trenton–Frankford Junction: Philadelphia and Trenton Railroad opened 1834; partially realigned 1911.
- Frankford Junction–Zoo Tower: Connecting Railway opened 1867.
- Zoo Tower–Grays Ferry Bridge: Junction Railroad opened 1863–1866.
- Grays Ferry–Bayview: Philadelphia, Wilmington and Baltimore Railroad opened 1837–1838, 1866, 1906.
- Bayview Yard–Baltimore Union Station: Union Railroad opened 1873.
- Baltimore Union Station–Landover: Baltimore and Potomac Rail Road opened 1872.
- Landover–Washington, D.C.: Magruder Branch opened 1907

==== New York City area ====
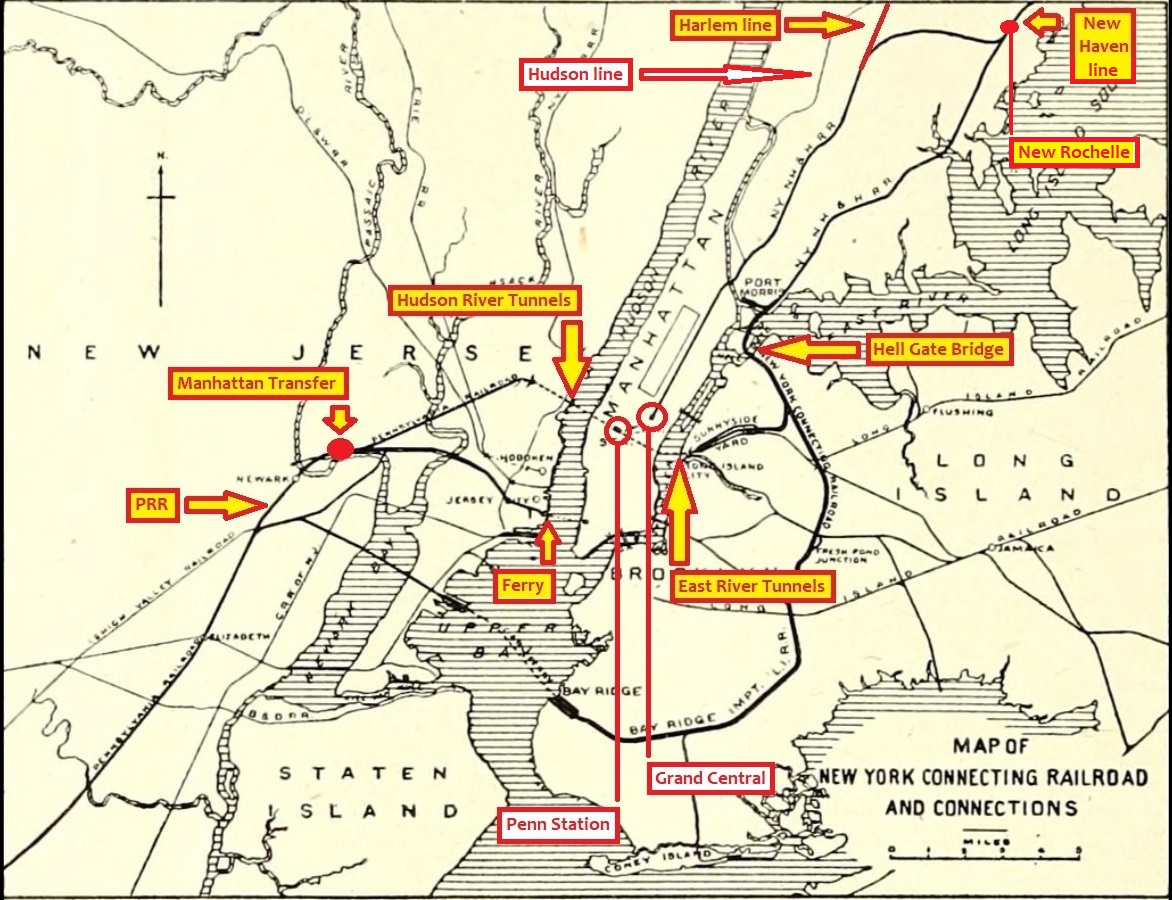
Annotated map of projects that the Pennsylvania Railroad and the New Haven Railroad undertook between 1903 and 1917, connecting their lines and effectively completing the Northeast Corridor. From left to right: Manhattan Transfer station; New York Tunnel Extension; Pennsylvania Station; New York Connecting Railroad; Hell Gate Bridge

- The Manhattan Transfer station (just above Newark), opened 1910
- New York Tunnel Extension, opened 1910
- Pennsylvania Station (1910–1963), completed 1910
- New York Connecting Railroad, completed 1917
- Hell Gate Bridge (connected to Harlem River and Port Chester Railroad), opened 1917

=== Electrification, 1905–38 ===
==== New York section ====
In 1899, William J. Wilgus, the New York Central Railroad (NYC)'s chief engineer, proposed electrifying the lines leading from Grand Central Terminal and the split at Mott Haven, using a third rail power system devised by Frank J. Sprague. Electricity was in use on some branch lines of the NYNH&H for interurban streetcars via third rail or trolley wire. An accident in the Park Avenue Tunnel near the present Grand Central Terminal that killed 17 people on January 8, 1902, was blamed on smoke from steam locomotives; the resulting outcry led to a push for electric operation in Manhattan.

The NH announced in 1905 that it would electrify its main line from New York to Stamford, Connecticut. Along with the construction of Grand Central Terminal, which was opened in 1913, the NYC electrified its lines. On September 30, 1906, the NYC conducted a test of suburban multiple unit service to High Bridge station on the Hudson Line; regular service began on December 11. Electric locomotives began serving Grand Central on February 15, 1907, and all NYC passenger service into Grand Central was electrified on July 1, 1907. NH electrification began in July to New Rochelle, August to Port Chester and October the rest of the way to Stamford. Steam trains last operated into Grand Central on June 30, 1908: the deadline after which steam trains were banned in Manhattan. Subsequently, all NH passenger trains into Manhattan were electrified. In June 1914, the NH electrification was extended to New Haven, which was the terminus of electrified service for over 80 years.

The PRR was building its Pennsylvania Station and electrified approaches, which were served by the PRR's lines in New Jersey and the Long Island Rail Road (LIRR). LIRR electric service began in 1905 on the Atlantic Branch from downtown Brooklyn past Jamaica, and in June 1910 on the branch to Long Island City: part of the main line to Penn Station. Penn Station opened on September 8, 1910, for LIRR trains and November 27 for the PRR; trains of both railroads were powered by DC electricity from a third rail. PRR trains changed engines (electric to/from steam) at Manhattan Transfer; passengers could also transfer there to H&M trains to downtown Manhattan.

On July 29, 1911, NH began electric service on its Harlem River Branch: a suburban branch that would become a main line with the completion of the New York Connecting Railroad and its Hell Gate Bridge. The bridge opened on March 9, 1917, but was operated by steam with an engine change at Sunnyside Yard east of Penn Station until 1918.

Electrification north of New Haven to Providence and Boston had been planned by the NH, and authorized by the company's board of directors shortly before the United States entered World War I. This plan was not carried out because of the war and the company's financial problems. Electrification north of New Haven did not occur until the 1990s, by Amtrak, using a 60 Hz system.

==== New York to Washington electrification ====
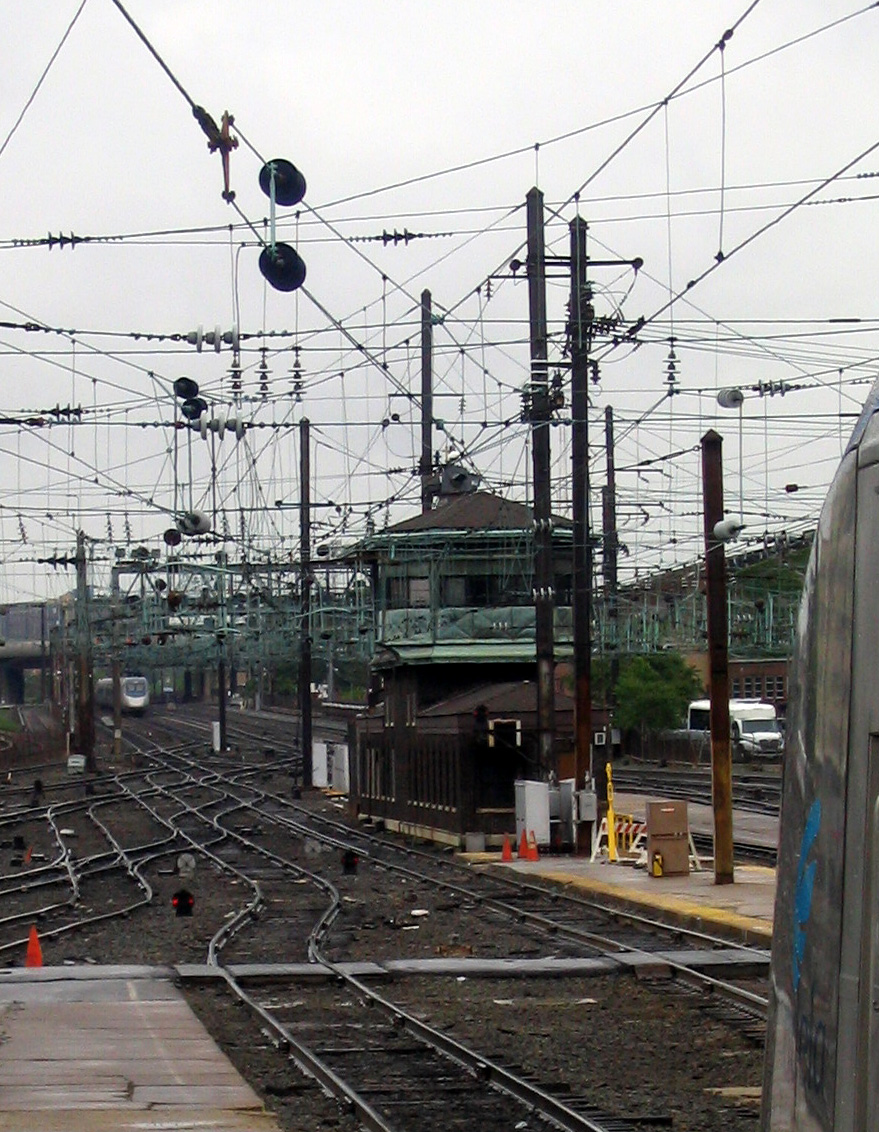
"K" Tower, north of Washington Union Station, is the only remaining interlocking tower on the Northeast Corridor south of Philadelphia

In 1905, the PRR began to electrify its suburban lines at Philadelphia, an effort that eventually led to 11 kV, 25 Hz AC catenary from New York and Washington. Electric service began in September 1915, with multiple unit trains west to Paoli on the PRR Main Line (now the Keystone Corridor). Electric service to Chestnut Hill (now the Chestnut Hill West Line), including a stretch of the NEC, began on March 30, 1918. Local electric service to Wilmington, Delaware, on the NEC began on September 30, 1928, and to Trenton, New Jersey, on June 29, 1930.

Electrified service between Exchange Place, the Jersey City terminal, and New Brunswick, New Jersey, began on December 8, 1932, including the extension of Penn Station electric service from Manhattan Transfer. On January 16, 1933, the rest of the electrification between New Brunswick and Trenton opened, giving a fully-electrified line between New York and Wilmington. Trains to Washington began running under electricity to Wilmington on February 12, 1933, with the engine-change moved from Manhattan Transfer to Wilmington. The same was done on April 9, 1933, for trains running west from Philadelphia, with the change point moved to Paoli.

In 1933, the electrification south of Wilmington was stalled by the Great Depression, but the PRR got a loan from the Public Works Administration to resume work. The tunnels at Baltimore were rebuilt as part of the project. Electric service between New York and Washington began on February 10, 1935. On April 7, the electrification of passenger trains was complete, with 639 daily trains: 191 hauled by locomotives and the other 448 under multiple-unit power. New York–Washington electric freight service began on May 20, 1935, after the electrification of freight lines in New Jersey and Washington, DC. Extensions to Potomac Yard across the Potomac River from Washington, as well as several freight branches along the way, were electrified in 1937 and 1938. The Potomac Yard retained its electrification until 1981.

==== Re-signaling ====
In the 1930s, PRR equipped the New York–Washington line with Pulse code cab signaling. Between 1998 and 2003, this system was overlaid with an Alstom Advanced Civil Speed Enforcement System (ACSES), using track-mounted transponders similar to the Balises of the modern European Train Control System. The ACSES enabled Amtrak to implement positive train control to comply with the Rail Safety Improvement Act of 2008.

=== Founding and operation of Amtrak ===
==== Reorganization and bankruptcy ====
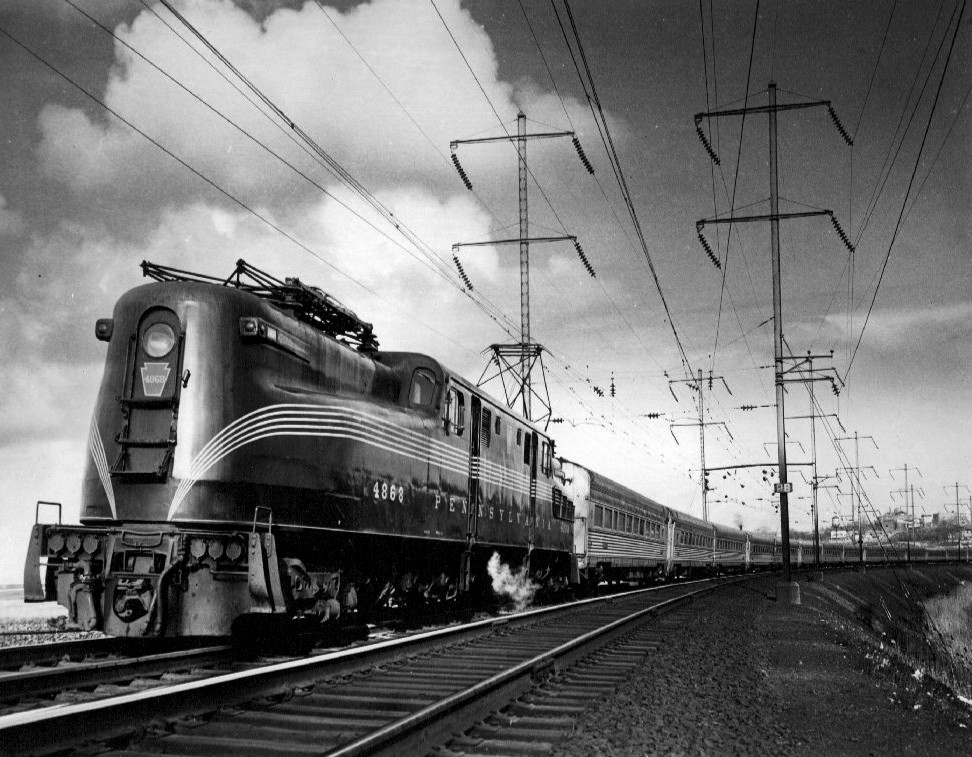
Pennsylvania Railroad's Congressional west of the North River Tunnels on its way to Washington, D.C.

In December 1967, the UAC TurboTrain set a speed record for a production train: 170.8 miles per hour (274.9 km/h) between New Brunswick and Trenton, New Jersey.

In February 1968, PRR merged with its rival New York Central Railroad to form the Penn Central (PC). Penn Central was required to absorb the New Haven in 1969 as a condition of the merger.

On September 21, 1970, all New York–Boston trains except the Turboservice were rerouted into Penn Station from Grand Central; the Turboservice moved on February 1, 1971, for cross-platform transfers to the Metroliners.

In 1971, Amtrak began operations, and various state governments took control of portions of the NEC for their commuter transportation authorities. In January, the Commonwealth of Massachusetts bought the Attleboro/Stoughton Line in Massachusetts, later operated by the Massachusetts Bay Transportation Authority. The same month, the New York State Metropolitan Transportation Authority bought, and Connecticut leased, from Penn Central their sections of the New Haven Line, between Woodlawn, New York, and New Haven, Connecticut.

In 1973, the Regional Rail Reorganization Act opened the way for Amtrak to buy sections of the NEC not already been sold to these commuter transportation authorities. These purchases by Amtrak were controversial at the time, and the Department of Transportation blocked the transaction and withheld purchase funds for several months until Amtrak granted it control over reconstruction of the corridor.

In February 1975, the Preliminary System Plan for Conrail proposed to stop running freight trains on the NEC between Groton, Connecticut, and Hillsgrove, Rhode Island, but this clause was rejected the following month by the U.S. Railway Association.

By April 1976, Amtrak owned the entire NEC except Boston to the RI state line, which is owned by the Commonwealth of Massachusetts, and New Haven to New Rochelle, New York, which is owned by the States of Connecticut and New York. Amtrak still operates and maintains the portion in Massachusetts, but the line from New Haven to New Rochelle, New York, is operated by the Metro-North Railroad, which has hindered the establishment of high-speed service.

==== Northeast Corridor Improvement Project ====
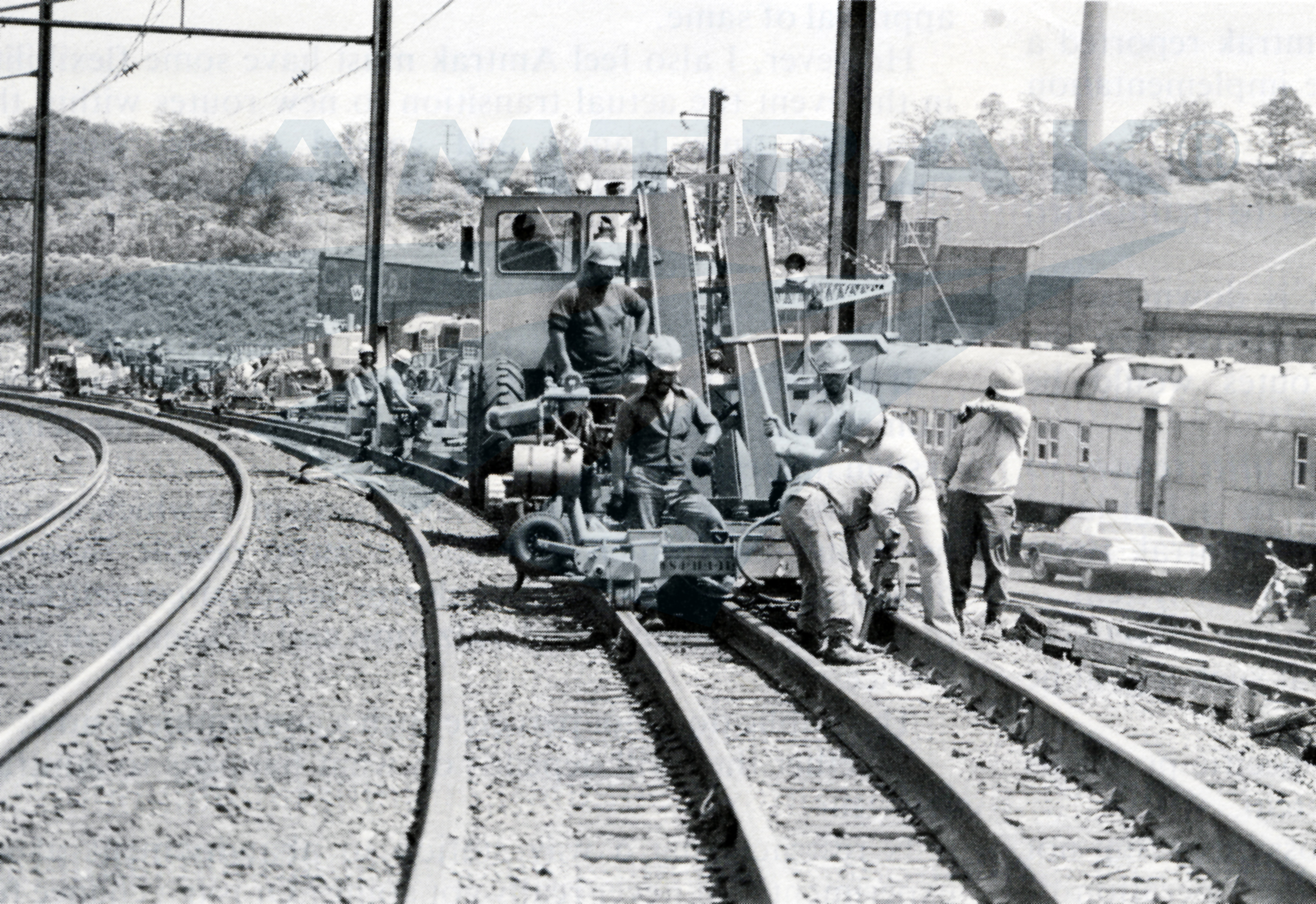
Northeast Corridor Improvement Project track work in April 1979

In 1976, Congress authorized an overhaul of the system between Washington and Boston. Called the Northeast Corridor Improvement Project (NECIP), it included safety improvements, modernization of the signaling system by General Railway Signal, and new Centralized Electrification and Traffic Control (CETC) control centers by Chrysler at Philadelphia, New York and Boston. It allowed more trains to run faster and closer together, and set the stage for later high-speed operation. NECIP also introduced the AEM-7 locomotive, which lowered travel times and became the most successful engine on the Corridor. The NECIP set travel time goals of 2 hours and 40 minutes between Washington and New York, and 3 hours and 40 minutes between Boston and New York. These goals were not met because of the low level of funding provided by the Reagan Administration and Congress in the 1980s.

Electrification between New Haven and Boston was to be included in the 1976 Railroad Revitalization and Regulatory Reform Act.

The last grade crossings between New York and Washington were closed about 1985; eleven grade crossings remain in Connecticut.

==== 1990s implementation of high-speed rail ====
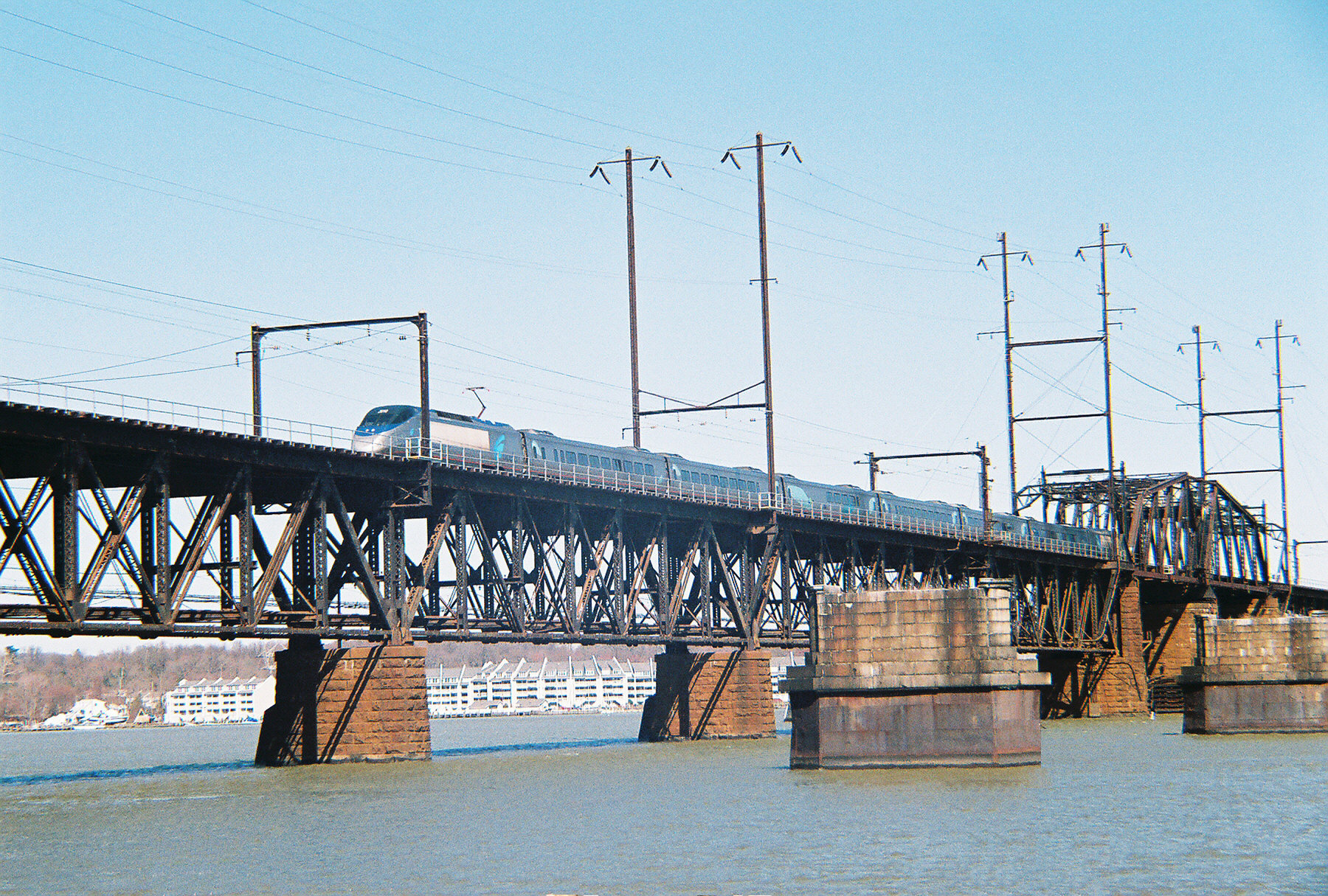
Amtrak Acela Express crosses the Susquehanna River in Maryland on a bridge built by the PRR in 1906.

In the 1990s, Amtrak upgraded the NEC north of New Haven, CT to get it ready for the high-speed Acela Express trains. Dubbed the Northeast High Speed Rail Improvement Program (NHRIP), the effort eliminated grade crossings, rebuilt bridges and modified curves. Concrete railroad ties replaced wood ties, and heavier continuous welded rail (CWR) was laid-down. In 1996, Amtrak began installing electrification infrastructure along the 157 miles (253 kilometres) of track between New Haven and Boston.

==== 2000–present ====
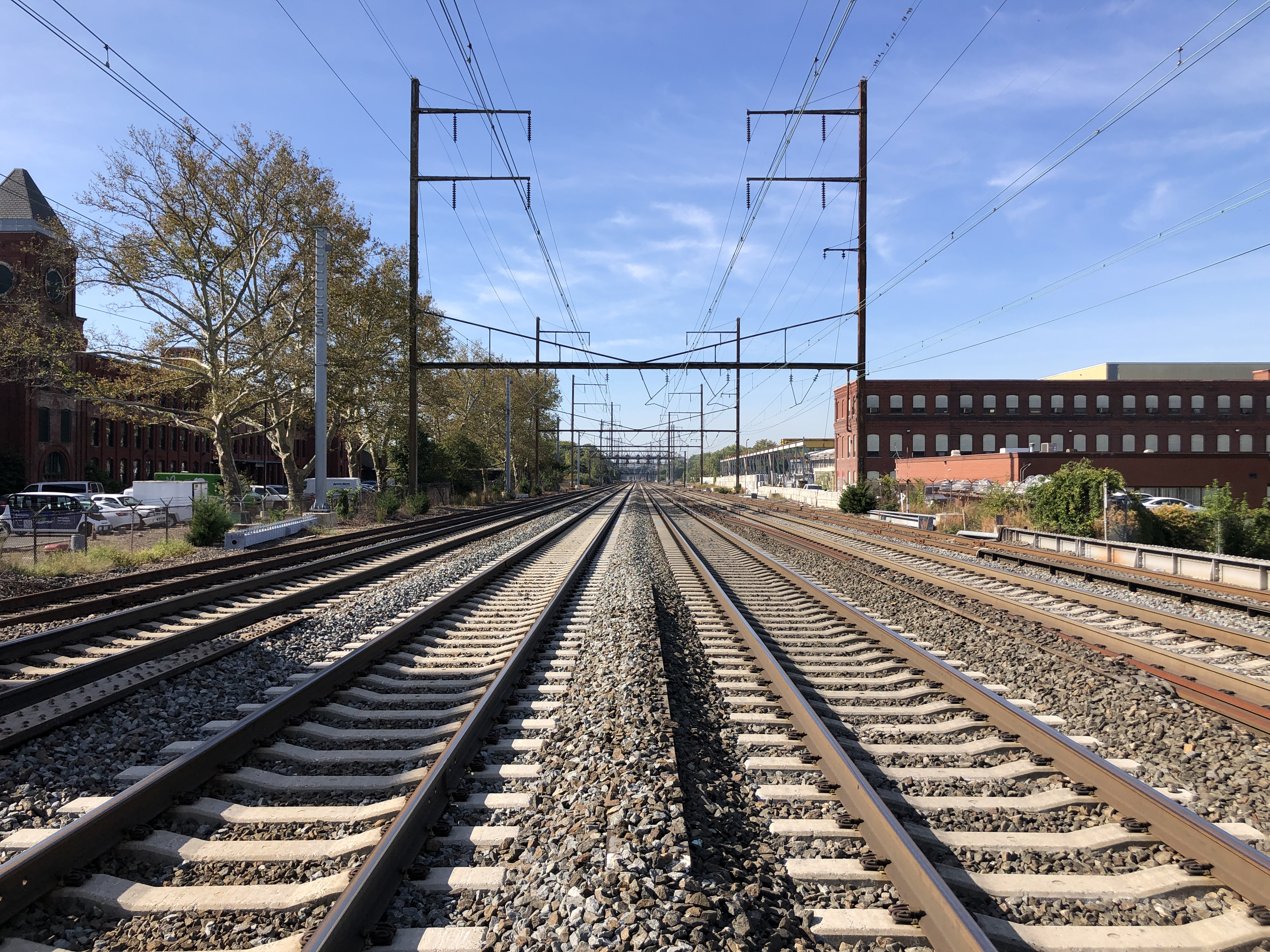
View along the Northeast Corridor tracks between Hamilton and Trenton in central New Jersey

Service with electric locomotives between New Haven and Boston began on January 31, 2000. The project took four years and cost close to $2.3 billion: $1.3 billion for the infrastructure improvements and close to $1 billion for both the new Acela Express trainsets and the Bombardier–Alstom HHP-8 locomotives.

On December 11, 2000, Amtrak began operating its higher-speed Acela Express service. Fastest travel time by Acela is three and a half hours between Boston and New York, and two hours forty-five minutes between New York and Washington, D.C.

In 2005, there was talk in Congress of splitting the Northeast Corridor, which was opposed by then-acting Amtrak president David Gunn. The plan, supported by the Bush administration, would "turn over the Northeast Corridor – the tracks from Washington to Boston that are the railroad's main physical asset – to a federal-state consortium."

With the passage of the Passenger Rail Investment and Improvement Act of 2008, the Congress established the Northeast Corridor Commission (NEC Commission) in the U.S. Department of Transportation to facilitate mutual cooperation and planning and to advise Congress on Corridor rail and development policy. The commission members include USDOT, Amtrak and the Northeast Corridor states.

In October 2010, Amtrak released "A Vision for High-Speed Rail on the Northeast Corridor," an aspirational proposal for dedicated high-speed rail tracks between Washington, D.C., and Boston. Many of these proposals are unfunded.

In August 2011 the United States Department of Transportation committed $450 million to a six-year project to support capacity increases on one of the busiest segments on the NEC: a 24-mile (39 km) section between New Brunswick and Trenton, passing through Princeton Junction. The Next Generation High-Speed project is designed to upgrade electrical power, signal systems and overhead catenary wires to improve reliability and increase speeds up to 160 mph (260 km/h), and, after the purchase of new equipment, up to 186 miles per hour (299 km/h). In September 2012, speed tests were conducted using Acela trainsets, achieving a speed of 165 miles per hour (266 km/h). The improvements were scheduled to be completed in 2016, but, due to delays, the project had not been completed until 2020.

In 2012, the Federal Railroad Administration began developing a master plan for bringing high-speed rail to the Northeast Corridor titled NEC FUTURE, and released the final environmental impact statement in December 2016. Multiple potential alignments north of New York City were studied. The proposed upgrades have not been funded.

== Infrastructure ==
The NEC is a cooperative venture between Amtrak and various state agencies. Amtrak owns the track between Washington and New Rochelle, New York, a northern suburb of New York City. The segment from New Rochelle to New Haven is owned by the states of New York and Connecticut; Metro-North Railroad commuter trains operate there. Amtrak owns the tracks north of New Haven to the border between Rhode Island and Massachusetts. The final segment from the border north to Boston is owned by the Commonwealth of Massachusetts.

=== Electrification ===
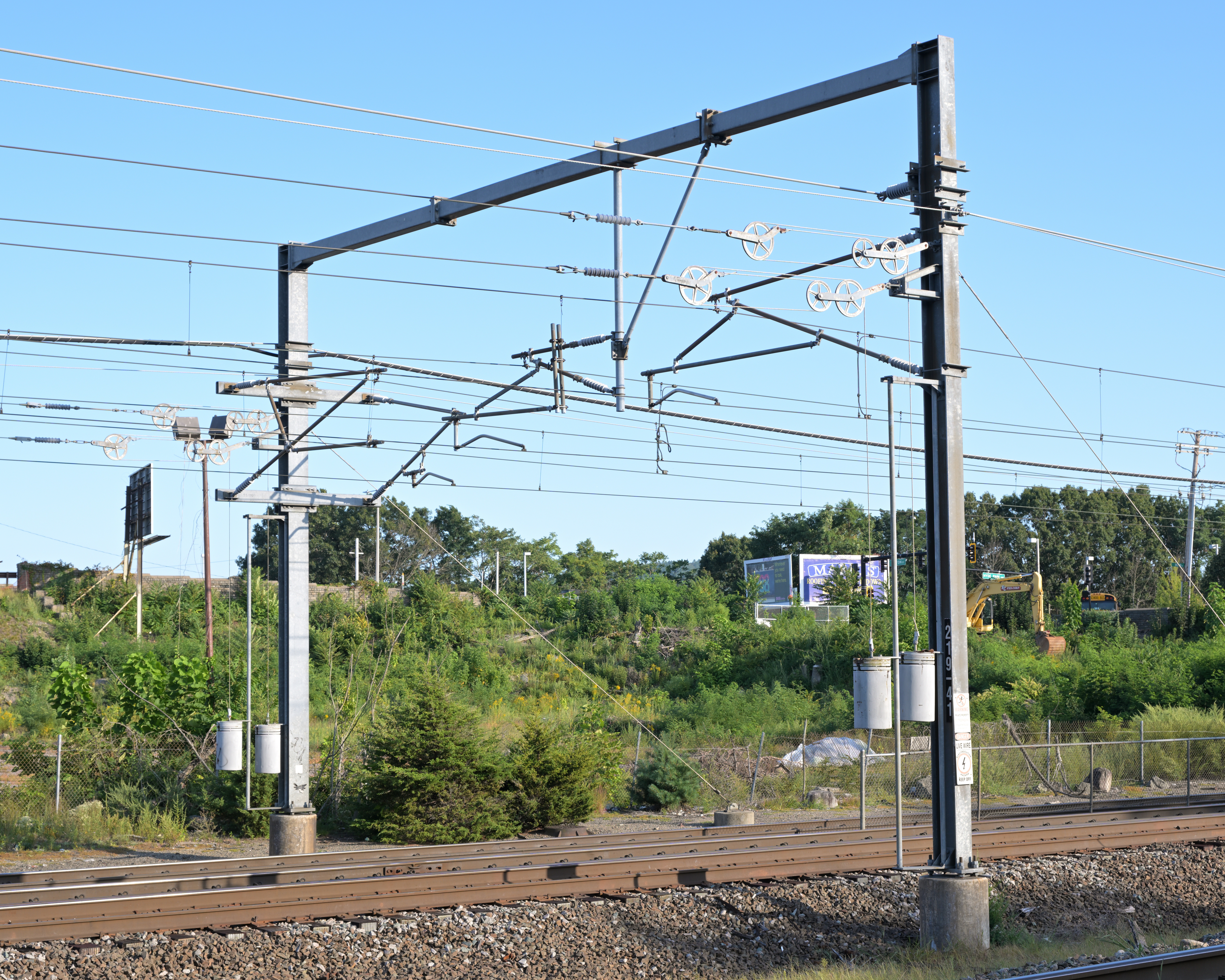
Constant-tension catenary on Amtrak's 60 Hz system

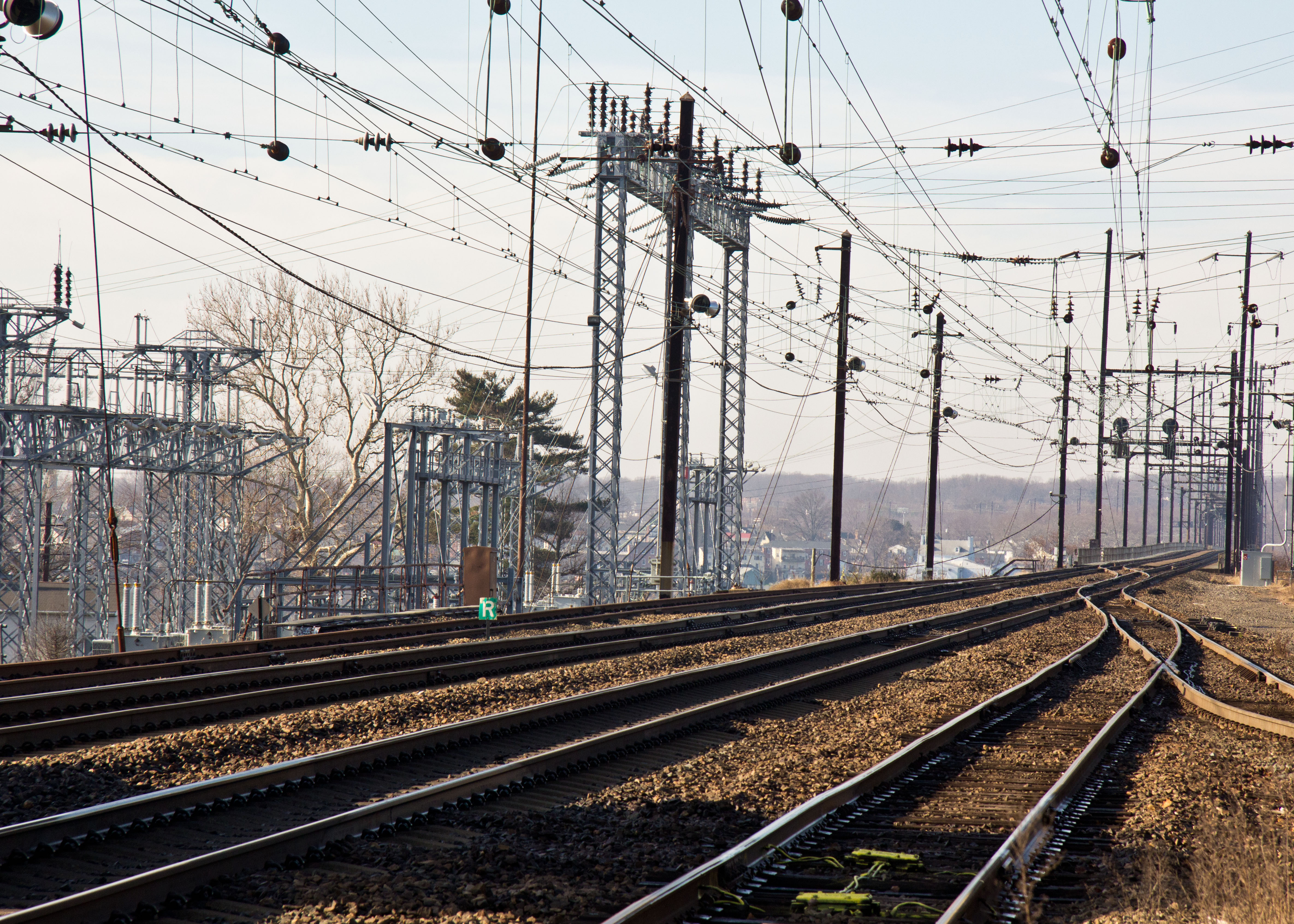
Older variable-tension catenary in Perryville, MD, on the ex-Pennsylvania Railroad 25Hz system

At just over 453 miles (729 km), the Northeast Corridor is the longest electrified rail corridor in the United States.

Currently, the corridor uses three catenary systems. From Washington, D.C., to Sunnyside Yard (just east of New York Penn Station), Amtrak's 25 Hz traction power system (originally built by the Pennsylvania Railroad) supplies 12 kV at 25 Hz. From Sunnyside to Mill River (just east of New Haven station), the former New Haven Railroad's system, since modified by Metro-North, supplies 12.5 kV at 60 Hz. From Mill River to Boston, the much newer 60 Hz traction power system supplies 25 kV at 60 Hz. All of Amtrak's electric locomotives can switch between these systems.

Constant-tension catenary is used between Pelham, NY and Boston, MA, as well as for a short section in New Jersey. Most of the catenary south of New York City is not constant tension. Trains operating under non-constant-tension catenary are limited to 135 miles per hour (217 km/h) to prevent catenary damage, despite Acela Express trains otherwise being capable of higher speeds. Speeds may be further reduced during hot weather due to the non-constant-tension catenary sagging, often causing delays.

In addition to catenary, the East River Tunnels have 750 V DC third rail for Long Island Rail Road trains, and the North River Tunnels have third rail for emergency use only.

In 2006, several high-profile electric-power failures delayed Amtrak and commuter trains on the Northeast Corridor up to five hours. Railroad officials blamed Amtrak's funding woes for the deterioration of the track and power supply system, which in places is almost a hundred years old. These problems have decreased in recent years after tracks and power systems were repaired and improved.

In September 2013, one of two feeder lines supplying power to the New Haven Line failed, while the other feeder was disabled for service. The lack of electrical power disrupted trains on Amtrak and Metro-North Railroad, which share the segment in New York State.

Numerous catenary and electrical issues slowed and interrupted service in New York and New Jersey during the spring and especially summer of 2024, leading to the latter being dubbed the "summer of hell". After Amtrak spent $27 million on infrastructure repairs, service improved in 2025 with significantly fewer cancelled New Jersey Transit trains.

=== Stations ===
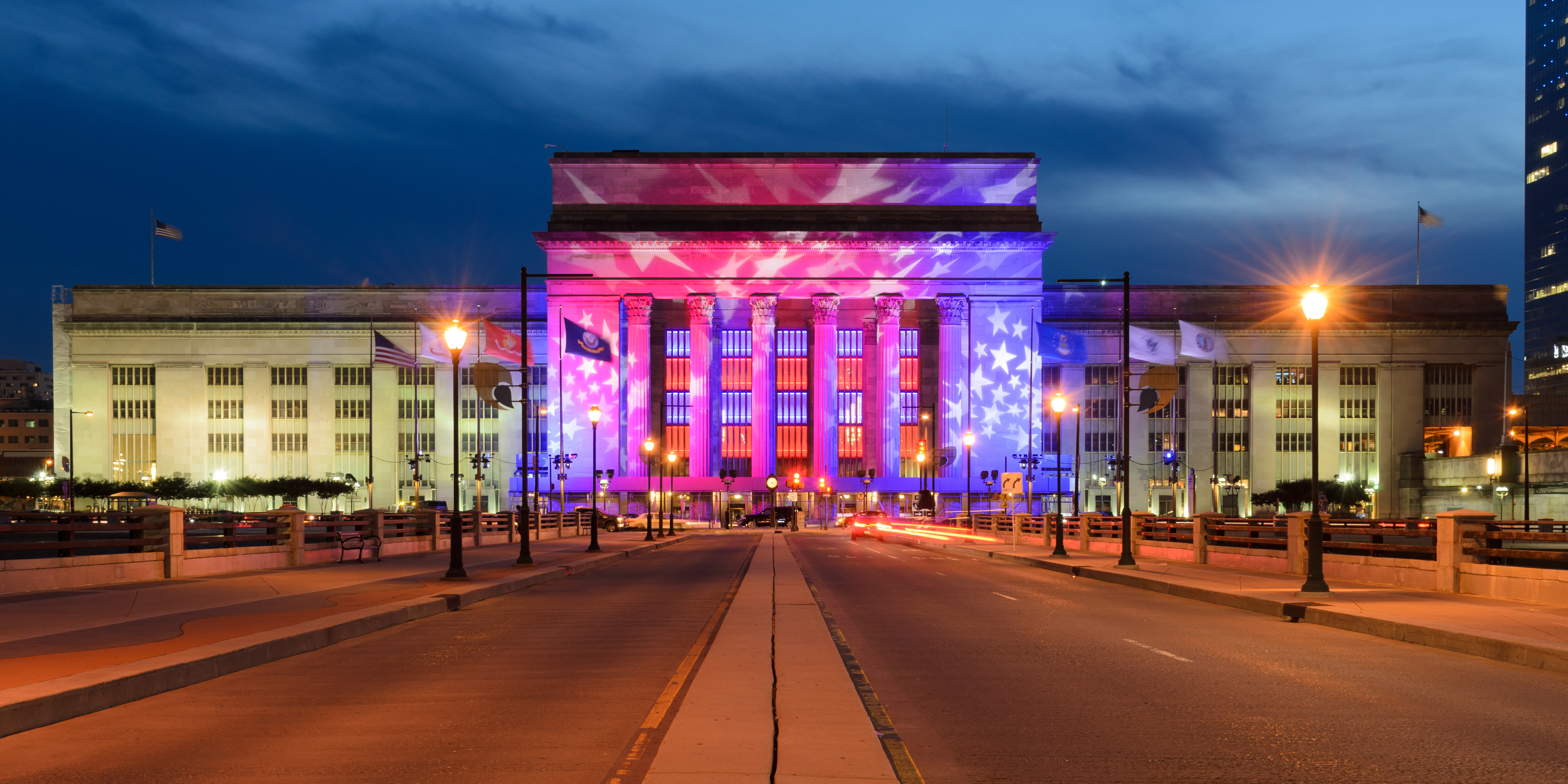
30th Street Station in Philadelphia, Amtrak's third busiest train station in the nation, July 2016

There are 109 active stations on the Northeast Corridor; 30 are used by Amtrak. All but three (Kingston, Westerly, and Mystic) see commuter service. Amtrak owns Pennsylvania Station in New York, 30th Street Station in Philadelphia, Penn Station in Baltimore, and Union Station in Washington.

The main services of the Northeast Corridor are indicated using the following abbreviations. Other services are listed in the right-most column. Note that not all trains necessarily stop at all indicated stations.

- Amtrak corridor: A (Acela), CL (Carolinian), KS (Keystone Service), NR (Northeast Regional), PA (Pennsylvanian), VT (Vermonter)
- Amtrak long distance: CD (Cardinal), CS (Crescent), PL (Palmetto), SM (Silver Meteor)

Table legend:

- ● (trains stop)
- | (trains pass)
- MBTA Commuter Rail lines: P/S (Providence/Stoughton Line), NE (Needham Line), FR (Franklin/Foxboro Line)
- CT Rail lines: SLE (Shore Line East)
- Metro-North Railroad lines: NHV (New Haven Line)
- NJ Transit Rail lines: NEC (Northeast Corridor Line), NJC (North Jersey Coast Line), RV (Raritan Valley Line)
- SEPTA Regional Rail lines: CHW (Chestnut Hill West Line), NWK (Wilmington/Newark Line), TRE (Trenton Line)
- MARC Train lines: PEN (Penn Line)

Station listing
Station	Distance from NYP	Amtrak services										Commuter services			Additional rail services/connections	Location	
Station	Distance from NYP	Corridors						Long-distance				Commuter services			Additional rail services/connections	Location	
Station	Distance from NYP	A	NR	VT	CL	KS	PA	CD	CS	PL	SM	Commuter services			Additional rail services/connections	Location	
Station	Distance from NYP	A	NR	VT	CL	KS	PA	CD	CS	PL	SM	Commuter services			Additional rail services/connections	City/Township	State/District
South Station	228.7 mi (368.1 km)	●	●									P/S	NE	FR	Amtrak: Lake Shore Limited; MBTA Commuter Rail: Fairmount, Fall River/New Bedford, Framingham/Worcester, Greenbush, Kingston; MBTA subway: Red Line Silver Line	Boston	Massachusetts
Back Bay	227.6 mi (366.3 km)	●	●									P/S	NE	FR	Amtrak: Lake Shore Limited; MBTA Commuter Rail: Framingham/Worcester Line; MBTA subway: Orange Line	Boston	Massachusetts
Ruggles	226.5 mi (364.5 km)	|	|									P/S	NE	FR	MBTA subway: Orange Line	Boston	Massachusetts
Forest Hills	223.7 mi (360.0 km)	|	|									P/S	NE	FR	MBTA subway: Orange Line	Boston	Massachusetts
Hyde Park	220.6 mi (355.0 km)	|	|									P/S		FR		Boston	Massachusetts
Readville	219.2 mi (352.8 km)	|	|											FR	MBTA Commuter Rail: Fairmount Line	Boston	Massachusetts
Route 128	217.3 mi (349.7 km)	●	●									P/S				Westwood	Massachusetts
Canton Junction	213.9 mi (344.2 km)	|	|									P/S				Canton	Massachusetts
Sharon	210.8 mi (339.2 km)	|	|									P/S				Sharon	Massachusetts
Mansfield	204.0 mi (328.3 km)	|	|									P/S				Mansfield	Massachusetts
Attleboro	196.9 mi (316.9 km)	|	|									P/S				Attleboro	Massachusetts
South Attleboro	191.9 mi (308.8 km)	|	|									P/S				Attleboro	Massachusetts
Pawtucket/Central Falls	189.3 mi (304.6 km)	|	|									P/S				Pawtucket	Rhode Island
Providence	185.1 mi (297.9 km)	●	●									P/S				Providence	Rhode Island
T. F. Green Airport	177.3 mi (285.3 km)	|	|									P/S				Warwick	Rhode Island
Wickford Junction	165.8 mi (266.8 km)	|	|									P/S				North Kingstown	Rhode Island
Kingston	158.1 mi (254.4 km)	|	●													West Kingston	Rhode Island
Westerly	141.3 mi (227.4 km)	|	●													Westerly	Rhode Island
Mystic	132.3 mi (212.9 km)	|	●													Mystic	Connecticut
New London	122.9 mi (197.8 km)	|	●									SLE				New London	Connecticut
Old Saybrook	105.1 mi (169.1 km)	|	●									SLE				Old Saybrook	Connecticut
Westbrook	101.2 mi (162.9 km)	|	|									SLE				Westbrook	Connecticut
Clinton	96.8 mi (155.8 km)	|	|									SLE				Clinton	Connecticut
Madison	93.1 mi (149.8 km)	|	|									SLE				Madison	Connecticut
Guilford	88.8 mi (142.9 km)	|	|									SLE				Guilford	Connecticut
Branford	81.4 mi (131.0 km)	|	|									SLE				Branford	Connecticut
New Haven State Street	72.7 mi (117.0 km)	|	●	|								SLE	NHV		Amtrak: Hartford Line, Valley Flyer; CT Rail: Hartford Line	New Haven	Connecticut
New Haven Union Station	72.3 mi (116.4 km)	●	●	●								SLE	NHV		Amtrak: Hartford Line, Valley Flyer; CT Rail: Hartford Line	New Haven	Connecticut
West Haven	69.4 mi (111.7 km)	|	|	|								SLE	NHV			West Haven	Connecticut
Milford	63.3 mi (101.9 km)	|	|	|								SLE	NHV			Milford	Connecticut
Stratford	59.0 mi (95.0 km)	|	|	|								SLE	NHV		Metro-North: ■ Waterbury Branch	Stratford	Connecticut
Bridgeport	55.4 mi (89.2 km)	|	●	●								SLE	NHV		Metro-North: ■ Waterbury Branch	Bridgeport	Connecticut
Fairfield–Black Rock	52.3 mi (84.2 km)	|	|	|								|	NHV			Fairfield	Connecticut
Fairfield	50.6 mi (81.4 km)	|	|	|								|	NHV			Fairfield	Connecticut
Southport	48.9 mi (78.7 km)	|	|	|								|	NHV			Fairfield	Connecticut
Green's Farms	47.2 mi (76.0 km)	|	|	|								|	NHV			Westport	Connecticut
Westport	44.2 mi (71.1 km)	|	|	|								|	NHV			Westport	Connecticut
East Norwalk	42.1 mi (67.8 km)	|	|	|								|	NHV			Norwalk	Connecticut
South Norwalk	41.0 mi (66.0 km)	|	|	|								|	NHV		Metro-North: ■ Danbury Branch	Norwalk	Connecticut
Rowayton	39.2 mi (63.1 km)	|	|	|								|	NHV			Norwalk	Connecticut
Darien	37.7 mi (60.7 km)	|	|	|								|	NHV			Darien	Connecticut
Noroton Heights	36.2 mi (58.3 km)	|	|	|								|	NHV			Darien	Connecticut
Stamford	33.1 mi (53.3 km)	●	●	●								SLE	NHV		Metro-North: ■ Danbury Branch, ■ New Canaan Branch	Stamford	Connecticut
Old Greenwich	31.3 mi (50.4 km)	|	|	|									NHV			Greenwich	Connecticut
Riverside	30.3 mi (48.8 km)	|	|	|									NHV			Greenwich	Connecticut
Cos Cob	29.6 mi (47.6 km)	|	|	|									NHV			Greenwich	Connecticut
Greenwich	28.1 mi (45.2 km)	|	|	|									NHV			Greenwich	Connecticut
Port Chester	25.7 mi (41.4 km)	|	|	|									NHV			Port Chester	New York State
Rye	24.1 mi (38.8 km)	|	|	|									NHV			Rye	New York State
Harrison	22.2 mi (35.7 km)	|	|	|									NHV			Harrison	New York State
Mamaroneck	20.5 mi (33.0 km)	|	|	|									NHV			Mamaroneck	New York State
Larchmont	18.7 mi (30.1 km)	|	|	|									NHV			Larchmont	New York State
New Rochelle	16.6 mi (26.7 km)	|	●	|									NHV			New Rochelle	New York State
New York Penn Station	0.0 mi (0 km)	●	●	●	●	●	●	●	●	●	●	RARV	NEC	NJCL	Amtrak: Adirondack, Berkshire Flyer, Ethan Allen Express, Empire Service, Lake Shore Limited, Maple Leaf; LIRR: ■ City Terminal Zone, ■ Port Washington Branch; NJ Transit: ■ Gladstone Branch, ■ Montclair–Boonton Line, ■ Morristown Line; NYC Subway: PATH: HOB-33 JSQ-33 JSQ-33 (via HOB)	New York City	New York State
Secaucus Junction	5.0 mi (8.0 km)	|	|	|	|	|	|	|	|	|	|	RARV	NEC	NJCL	NJ Transit: ■ Bergen, ■ Gladstone, ■ Main, ■ Montclair-Boonton, ■ Morristown, ■ Pascack Valley ■ Meadowlands Rail Line; Metro-North: ■ Port Jervis Line	Secaucus	New Jersey
Newark Penn Station	10.0 mi (16.1 km)	●	●	●	●	●	●	●	●	●	●	RARV	NEC	NJCL	Newark Light Rail; PATH: NWK-WTC	Newark	New Jersey
Newark Airport	12.6 mi (20.3 km)	|	●	|	|	●	|	|	|	|	|		NEC	NJCL	AirTrain Newark	Newark	New Jersey
North Elizabeth	14.4 mi (23.2 km)	|	|	|	|	|	|	|	|	|	|		NEC	NJCL		Elizabeth	New Jersey
Elizabeth	15.4 mi (24.8 km)	|	|	|	|	|	|	|	|	|	|		NEC	NJCL		Elizabeth	New Jersey
Linden	18.6 mi (29.9 km)	|	|	|	|	|	|	|	|	|	|		NEC	NJCL		Linden	New Jersey
Rahway	20.7 mi (33.3 km)	|	|	|	|	|	|	|	|	|	|		NEC	NJCL		Rahway	New Jersey
Metropark	24.6 mi (39.6 km)	●	●	●	|	●	●	|	●	●	|		NEC			Woodbridge	New Jersey
Metuchen	27.1 mi (43.6 km)	|	|	|	|	|	|	|	|	|	|		NEC			Metuchen	New Jersey
Edison	30.3 mi (48.8 km)	|	|	|	|	|	|	|	|	|	|		NEC			Edison	New Jersey
New Brunswick	32.7 mi (52.6 km)	|	●	|	|	●	|	|	|	|	|		NEC			New Brunswick	New Jersey
Jersey Avenue	34.4 mi (55.4 km)	|	|	|	|	|	|	|	|	|	|		NEC			New Brunswick	New Jersey
Princeton Junction	48.8 mi (78.5 km)	|	●	|	|	●	|	|	|	|	|		NEC		NJ Transit: ■ Princeton Branch	Princeton Junction	New Jersey
Hamilton	54.4 mi (87.5 km)	|	|	|	|	|	|	|	|	|	|		NEC			Hamilton Township	New Jersey
Trenton	58.1 mi (93.5 km)	|	●	●	●	●	●	●	●	●	●	TRE	NEC		NJ Transit: ■ River Line	Trenton	New Jersey
Levittown	64.7 mi (104.1 km)	|	|	|	|	|	|	|	|	|	|	TRE				Tullytown	Pennsylvania
Bristol	67.8 mi (109.1 km)	|	|	|	|	|	|	|	|	|	|	TRE				Bristol	Pennsylvania
Croydon	70.7 mi (113.8 km)	|	|	|	|	|	|	|	|	|	|	TRE				Croydon	Pennsylvania
Eddington	72.4 mi (116.5 km)	|	|	|	|	|	|	|	|	|	|	TRE				Eddington	Pennsylvania
Cornwells Heights	73.7 mi (118.6 km)	|	|	|	|	●	|	|	|	|	|	TRE				Cornwells Heights	Pennsylvania
Torresdale	75.8 mi (122.0 km)	|	|	|	|	|	|	|	|	|	|	TRE				Philadelphia	Pennsylvania
Holmesburg Junction	78.3 mi (126.0 km)	|	|	|	|	|	|	|	|	|	|	TRE				Philadelphia	Pennsylvania
Tacony	79.3 mi (127.6 km)	|	|	|	|	|	|	|	|	|	|	TRE				Philadelphia	Pennsylvania
Bridesburg	81.2 mi (130.7 km)	|	|	|	|	|	|	|	|	|	|	TRE				Philadelphia	Pennsylvania
North Philadelphia	86.0 mi (138.4 km)	|	|	|	|	●	|	|	|	|	|	TRE		CHW	SEPTA Metro:	Philadelphia	Pennsylvania
30th Street Station	90.5 mi (145.6 km)	●	●	●	●	●	●	●	●	●	●	TRE	NWK	CHW	SEPTA Regional Rail: all lines NJ Transit: ■ Atlantic City Line; SEPTA Metro:	Philadelphia	Pennsylvania
Darby	94.8 mi (152.6 km)	|	|	|	|			|	|	|	|		NWK			Darby	Pennsylvania
Curtis Park	95.5 mi (153.7 km)	|	|	|	|			|	|	|	|		NWK			Sharon Hill	Pennsylvania
Sharon Hill	96.2 mi (154.8 km)	|	|	|	|			|	|	|	|		NWK			Sharon Hill	Pennsylvania
Folcroft	96.7 mi (155.6 km)	|	|	|	|			|	|	|	|		NWK			Folcroft	Pennsylvania
Glenolden	97.3 mi (156.6 km)	|	|	|	|			|	|	|	|		NWK			Glenolden	Pennsylvania
Norwood	98.0 mi (157.7 km)	|	|	|	|			|	|	|	|		NWK			Norwood	Pennsylvania
Prospect Park	98.7 mi (158.8 km)	|	|	|	|			|	|	|	|		NWK			Prospect Park	Pennsylvania
Ridley Park	99.4 mi (160.0 km)	|	|	|	|			|	|	|	|		NWK			Ridley Park	Pennsylvania
Crum Lynne	100.1 mi (161.1 km)	|	|	|	|			|	|	|	|		NWK			Ridley Park	Pennsylvania
Eddystone	101.3 mi (163.0 km)	|	|	|	|			|	|	|	|		NWK			Eddystone	Pennsylvania
Chester	102.4 mi (164.8 km)	|	|	|	|			|	|	|	|		NWK			Chester	Pennsylvania
Highland Avenue	104.5 mi (168.2 km)	|	|	|	|			|	|	|	|		NWK			Chester	Pennsylvania
Marcus Hook	105.7 mi (170.1 km)	|	|	|	|			|	|	|	|		NWK			Marcus Hook	Pennsylvania
Claymont	108.6 mi (174.8 km)	|	|	|	|			|	|	|	|		NWK			Claymont	Delaware
Wilmington	115.8 mi (186.4 km)	●	●	●	●			●	●	●	●		NWK			Wilmington	Delaware
Churchmans Crossing	121.5 mi (195.5 km)	|	|	|	|			|	|	|	|		NWK			Wilmington	Delaware
Newark	127.7 mi (205.5 km)	|	●	|	|			|	|	|	|		NWK			Newark	Delaware
Perryville	148.5 mi (239.0 km)	|	|	|	|			|	|	|	|	PEN				Perryville	Maryland
Aberdeen	154.5 mi (248.6 km)	|	●	|	|			|	|	|	|	PEN				Aberdeen	Maryland
Edgewood	164.1 mi (264.1 km)	|	|	|	|			|	|	|	|	PEN				Edgewood	Maryland
Martin State Airport	173.0 mi (278.4 km)	|	|	|	|			|	|	|	|	PEN				Middle River	Maryland
Penn Station	184.7 mi (297.2 km)	●	●	●	●			●	●	●	●	PEN			MTA Maryland: Light RailLink	Baltimore	Maryland
West Baltimore	187.5 mi (301.8 km)	|	|	|	|			|	|	|	|	PEN				Baltimore	Maryland
Halethorpe	192.3 mi (309.5 km)	|	|	|	|			|	|	|	|	PEN				Halethorpe	Maryland
BWI Airport	195.3 mi (314.3 km)	●	●	●	|			|	●	●	|	PEN				Linthicum Heights	Maryland
Odenton	202.6 mi (326.1 km)	|	|	|	|			|	|	|	|	PEN				Odenton	Maryland
Bowie State	208.4 mi (335.4 km)	|	|	|	|			|	|	|	|	PEN				Bowie	Maryland
Seabrook	213.7 mi (343.9 km)	|	|	|	|			|	|	|	|	PEN				Seabrook	Maryland
New Carrollton	216.0 mi (347.6 km)	|	●	●	|			|	|	●	|	PEN			Washington Metro: Orange Line, Silver Line	New Carrollton	Maryland
Union Station	224.7 mi (361.6 km)	●	●	●	●			●	●	●	●	PEN			Amtrak: Floridian; MARC: ■ Brunswick Line, ■ Camden Line; VRE: ■ Fredericksburg Line, ■ Manassas Line; Washington Metro: Red Line	Washington, D.C.	

=== Grade crossings ===
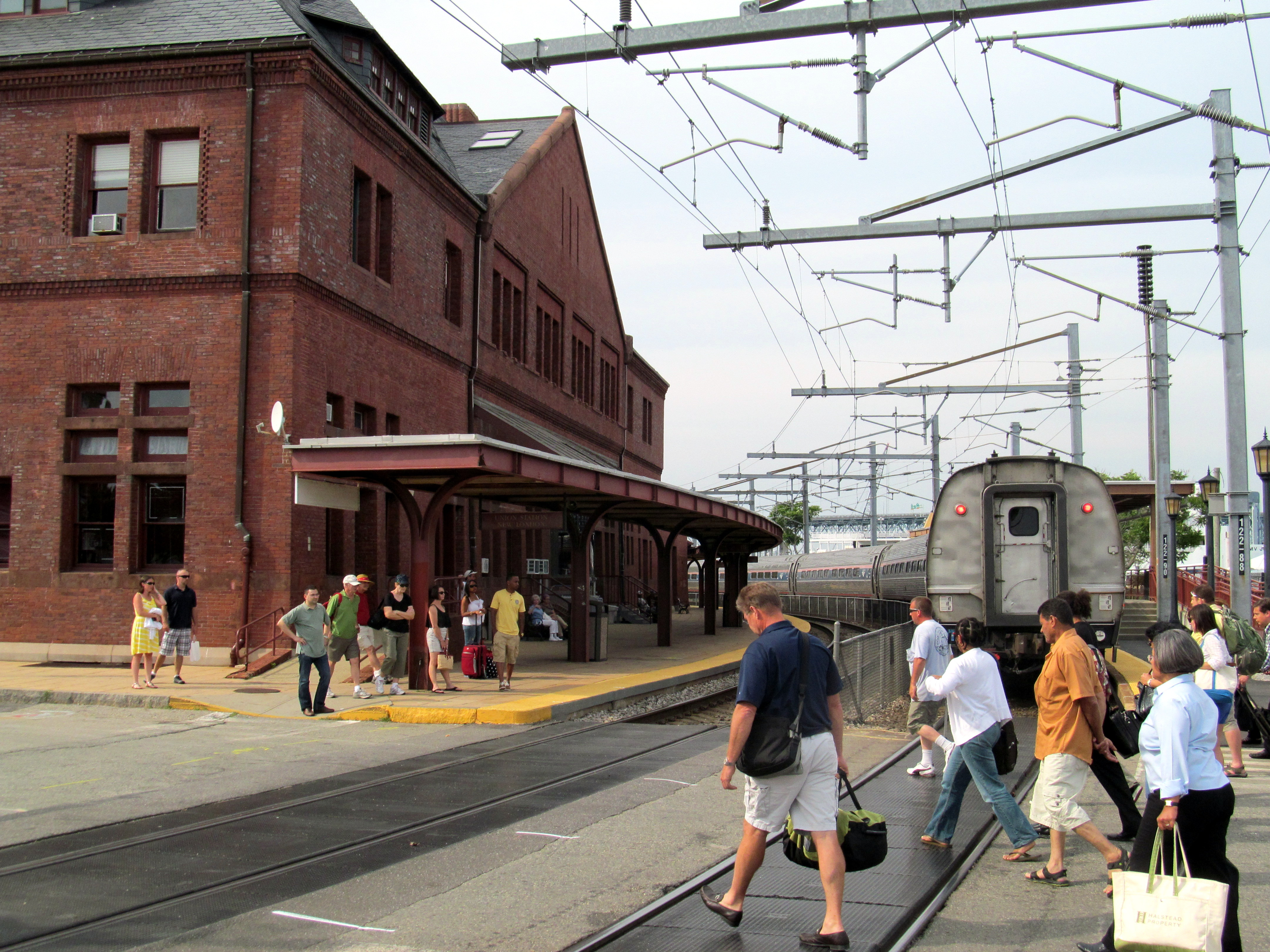
Passengers crossing the State Street crossing in New London after departing a northbound train

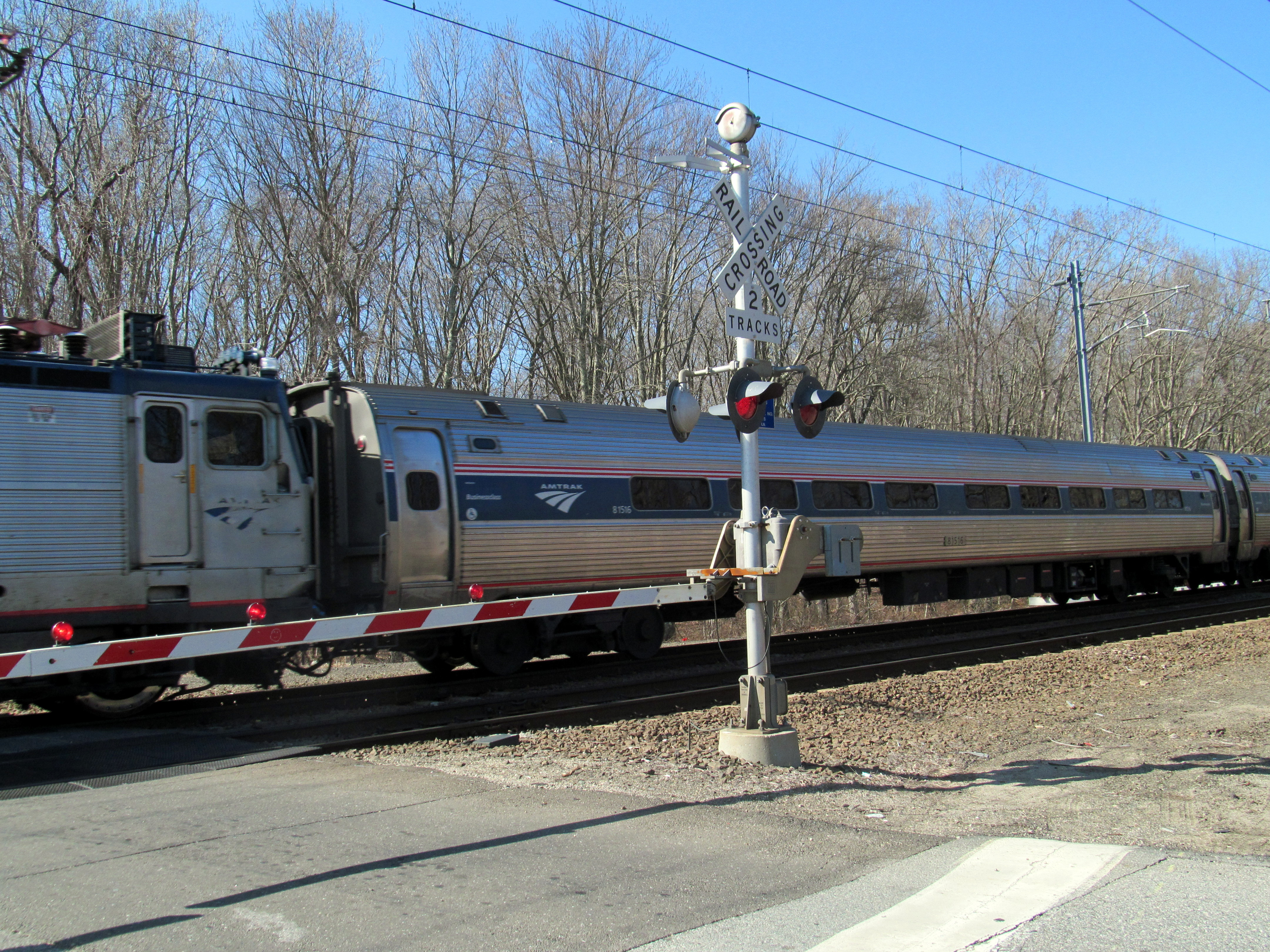
A Northeast Regional train crosses Miner Lane in Waterford, the site of a fatal accident in 2005

The entire Northeast Corridor has 11 grade crossings, all in southeastern New London County, Connecticut. The remaining grade crossings are along a part of the line that hugs the shore of Long Island Sound. Some of these crossings constitute the only points of access to waterfront communities and businesses otherwise disconnected from the road network. As such, eliminating them would require grade separation to maintain access. Six of the grade crossings have four-quadrant gates with induction loop sensors, which allow vehicles stopped on the tracks to be detected in time for an oncoming train to stop. The remaining five grade crossings, 3 near New London Union Station and two in Stonington, have dual gates.

FRA rules limit track speeds on the corridor to 80 miles per hour (130 km/h) over conventional crossings and 95 miles per hour (153 km/h) over crossings with four-quadrant gates and vehicle detection tied into the signal system.

==== History ====
The New York to New Haven line has long been completely grade-separated, and the last grade crossings between Washington and New York were eliminated in the 1980s. In 1994, during planning for electrification and high-speed Acela Express service between New Haven and Boston, a law was passed requiring USDOT to plan for the elimination of all remaining crossings (unless impractical or unnecessary) by 1997. Some lightly used crossings were simply closed, while most were converted into bridges or underpasses. Only thirteen remained by 1999, of which lightly used crossings in Old Lyme, Connecticut, and Exeter, Rhode Island, were soon closed.

Despite six nonfatal accidents in the previous sixteen years, there was substantial local opposition to closing the remaining 11 crossings. Outright closing the crossing would eliminate the sole access points to several of the places they served, while grade separation would be expensive and require land takings. Instead, the crossings were supplied with additional protections. In 1998, School Street in Groton was the first four-quadrant gate installation in the country with vehicle detection sensors tied into the line's signal system. It cost $1 million rather than the $4 million for a bridge. Seven more crossings received similar installations in 1999 and 2000; only the three in New London (which are on a tight curve with speed limits under 30 miles per hour (48 km/h)) did not.

On September 28, 2005, a southbound Acela Express struck a car at Miner Lane in Waterford, Connecticut, the first such incident since the additional protections were implemented. The train was approaching the crossing at approximately 70 miles per hour (110 km/h) when the car reportedly rolled under the lowered crossing gate arms too late for the sensor system to fully stop the train. The driver and one passenger were killed on impact; the other passenger died nine days later from injuries sustained in the crash. The gates were later inspected and declared to have been functioning properly at the time of the incident. The incident drew public criticism about the remaining grade crossings along the busy line.

==== Crossing list ====
Crossing are listed east to west.

Miles	City	Street	DOT/AAR number	Coordinates	Details
140.6	Stonington	Palmer Street	500263U	41.372491°N 71.835678°W	Connects the Pawcatuck residential area to the Mechanic Street arterial.
136.7	Stonington	Elihu Island Road	500267W	41.340922°N 71.889912°W	Provides sole access to Elihu Island. Private crossing.
136.6	Stonington	Walker's Dock	500269K	41.340073°N 71.891184°W	Provides sole access to a small marina. Private crossing.
134.9	Stonington	Wamphassuc Road	500272T	41.342016°N 71.921605°W	Provides sole access to a residential area.
133.4	Stonington	Latimer Point Road	500275N	41.341312°N 71.948967°W	Provides sole access to a residential area.
132.3	Stonington	Broadway Avenue Extension	500277C	41.350813°N 71.963872°W	Next to Mystic station. Provides sole access to a residential and industrial area, several marinas, and the northbound platform.
131.2	Groton	School Street	500278J	41.344933°N 71.977092°W	Provides sole access to the Willow Point residential area and marina.
123.0	New London	Governor Winthrop Boulevard	500294T	41.356984°N 72.094777°W	Provides sole access to Block Island Ferry and Cross Sound Ferry docks and other marine facilities. Does not have quad gates.
122.8	New London	State Street	500295A	41.353845°N 72.092991°W	Next to New London Union Station. Provides access to the Fisher's Island Ferry, City Pier, Waterfront Park, and the northbound platform.
122.5	New London	Bank Street Extension	500297N	41.35128°N 72.095957°W	Provides access to Waterfront Park.
120.2	Waterford	Miner Lane	500307S	41.335726°N 72.123845°W	Provides sole access to a residential and industrial area.

=== Bridges ===
- Thames River Bridge
- Niantic River Bridge
- Amtrak Old Saybrook–Old Lyme Bridge
- Housatonic River Railroad Bridge
- Mianus River Railroad Bridge
- Pelham Bay Bridge
- Bronx River Railroad Bridge
- Hell Gate Bridge
- Portal North Bridge (entered into service on March 13, 2026, replacing the Portal Bridge)
- Sawtooth Bridges
- Dock Bridge
- Rahway River Bridge
- Raritan River Bridge
- Morrisville–Trenton Railroad Bridge
- Pennsylvania Railroad, Connecting Railway Bridge
- Amtrak Susquehanna River Bridge
- Bush River Bridge
- Gunpowder River Bridge
- Amtrak Railroad Anacostia Bridge

=== Tunnels ===
- Baltimore and Potomac Tunnel
- Union Tunnel (Baltimore)
- East River Tunnels
- North River Tunnels

== Passenger ridership ==
Annual passenger ridership
FY*	Northeast Regional	Acela	Total ridership	% Change
2004	6,475,000	2,569,000	9,044,000
2005	7,116,000	1,773,000	8,889,000	-1.7%
2006	6,755,000	2,583,000	9,338,000	+5.1%
2007	6,837,000	3,184,000	10,021,000	+7.3%
2008	7,489,000	3,399,000	10,888,000	+8.7%
2009	6,921,000	3,020,000	9,941,000	-8.7%
2011	7,515,000	3,379,000	10,894,000	+5.1%
2012	8,014,000	3,395,000	11,409,000	+4.7%
2013	8,044,000	3,343,000	11,387,000	-0.2%
2014	8,083,000	3,545,000	11,628,000	+2.2%
2015	8,215,523	3,473,644	11,707,079	+0.7%
2016	8,409,662	3,489,311	11,909,847	+1.7%
2017	8,569,867	3,442,188	12,027,305	+1.0%
2018	8,686,930	3,428,338	12,123,643	+0.8%
2019	8,940,745	3,577,455	12,525,602	+3.3%
2020	4,486,837	1,656,764	6,147,481	-49.7%
2021	3,508,766	897,639	4,408,825
2022	7,091,325	2,144,369	9,235,694	+109.5%
2023	9,163,082	2,959,384	12,122,466	+31.3%
2024	10,814,407	3,239,130	14,052,537	+15.9%
2025	12,018,536	3,153,621	15,173,228	+8.1%
2026	12,915,500	3,305,900	16,222,000	+6.9%
Sources: 2004–2014; 2015–2016 2017–2018 2018–2019 2019–2020 2019-2021 2021-2022 2023 2024 20252026

== Current rail service ==
=== Intercity passenger services ===
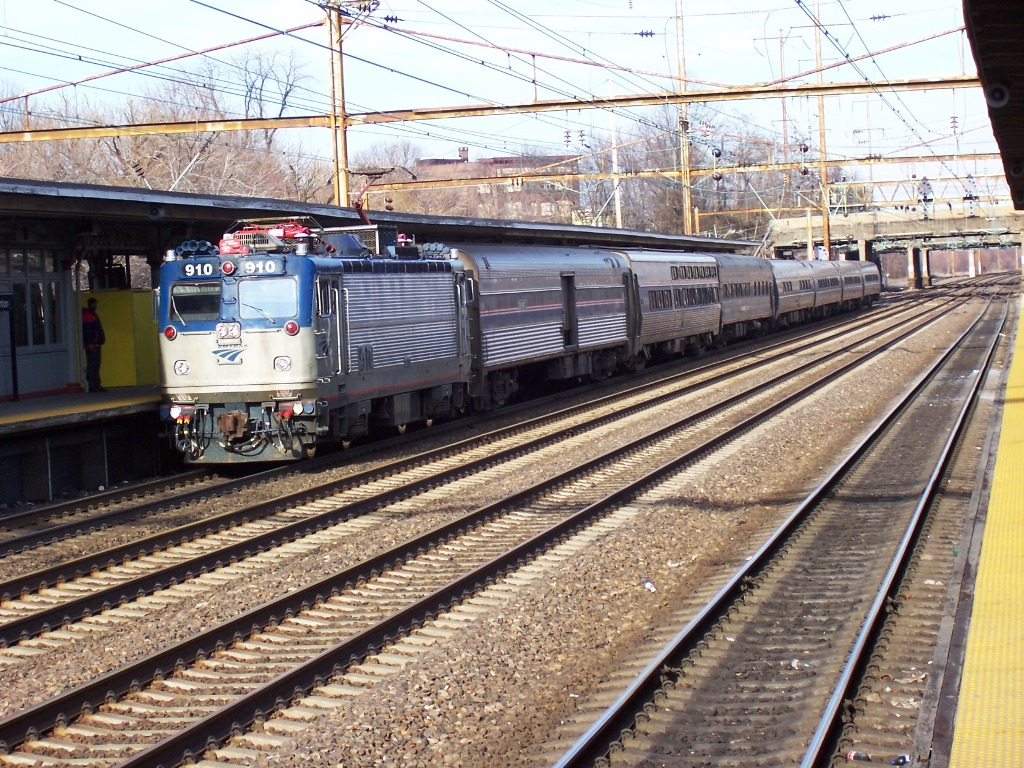
New Orleans-bound Crescent in Trenton, New Jersey

In 2003, Amtrak accounted for about 14% of intercity trips between the cities served by the NEC and its branches (the rest were taken by airline, automobile, or bus). A 2011 study estimated that in 2010 Amtrak carried 6% of the Boston–Washington traffic, compared to 80% for automobiles, 8–9% for intercity bus, and 5% for airlines. Amtrak's share of the air or rail passenger traffic between New York City and Boston has grown from 20 percent to 54 percent since 2001, and 75 percent between New York City and Washington, D.C.

These Amtrak trains serve NEC stations and run at least partially on the corridor:

- Acela: high-speed rail Boston–Washington, D.C.
- Cardinal: New York–Chicago via Washington, D.C. (Wednesdays, Fridays, and Sundays only)
- Carolinian: New York–Charlotte, North Carolina
- Crescent: New York–New Orleans
- Keystone Service: higher-speed rail Harrisburg, Pennsylvania – New York
- Northeast Regional: higher-speed rail (This service qualifies as high speed rail on the 125 mph stretch between New Brunswick and Princeton Junction.) Boston/Springfield/New York–Washington D.C./Richmond/Newport News/Norfolk/Roanoke, Virginia
- Palmetto: Savannah, Georgia – New York
- Pennsylvanian: Pittsburgh–New York via NEC and Philadelphia to Harrisburg Main Line
- Silver Meteor: Miami–New York
- Vermonter: St. Albans, Vermont – Washington, D.C., via NEC and New Haven–Springfield Line

Seven other Amtrak trains terminate at NEC stations, but do not use any NEC infrastructure outside the terminus:

- Amtrak Hartford Line: operated in conjunction with ConnDOT, runs across Amtrak-owned New Haven–Springfield line from Springfield Union to New Haven Union, the latter of which uses NEC infrastructure.

Six Amtrak services operate via the Empire Corridor, a line largely owned by CSX, with other sections owned by Metro-North Railroad and Amtrak. It meets the NEC at New York Penn Station.

- Adirondack: runs from New York Penn to Montreal Central
- Berkshire Flyer: higher-speed rail from New York Penn to Albany–Rensselaer and the Joseph Scelsi Intermodal Transportation Center in Pittsfield, Massachusetts
- Empire Service: higher-speed rail from New York Penn to Albany–Rensselaer and Niagara Falls
- Ethan Allen Express: runs from Burlington Union to New York Penn
- Lake Shore Limited: runs from Chicago Union to New York Penn; also has a branch to the NEC's terminus at Boston South
- Maple Leaf: runs from New York Penn to Toronto Union

The Floridian, which travels between Chicago Union and Miami, intersects with the Northeast Corridor at Washington Union.

Due to the wide availability of the Northeast Regional, Keystone Service, and Acela, as well as commuter rail, most long- and medium-haul trains operating along the New York-Washington leg of the NEC do not allow local travel between NEC stations. In most cases, long- and medium-haul trains only stop to discharge passengers from Washington (and in some cases, Alexandria) northward, and to receive passengers from Newark to Washington. This policy is intended to keep seats available for passengers making longer trips. The Vermonter and Palmetto are the only medium- and long-haul trains that allow local travel in both directions between New York and Washington. The southbound Carolinian allows local travel daily, while the northbound Carolinian only allows local travel on Sundays, Thursdays, and Fridays. Additionally, the medium-haul Pennsylvanian allows local NEC travel, but this train leaves the corridor in Philadelphia and does not travel all the way to Washington.

=== Commuter rail ===
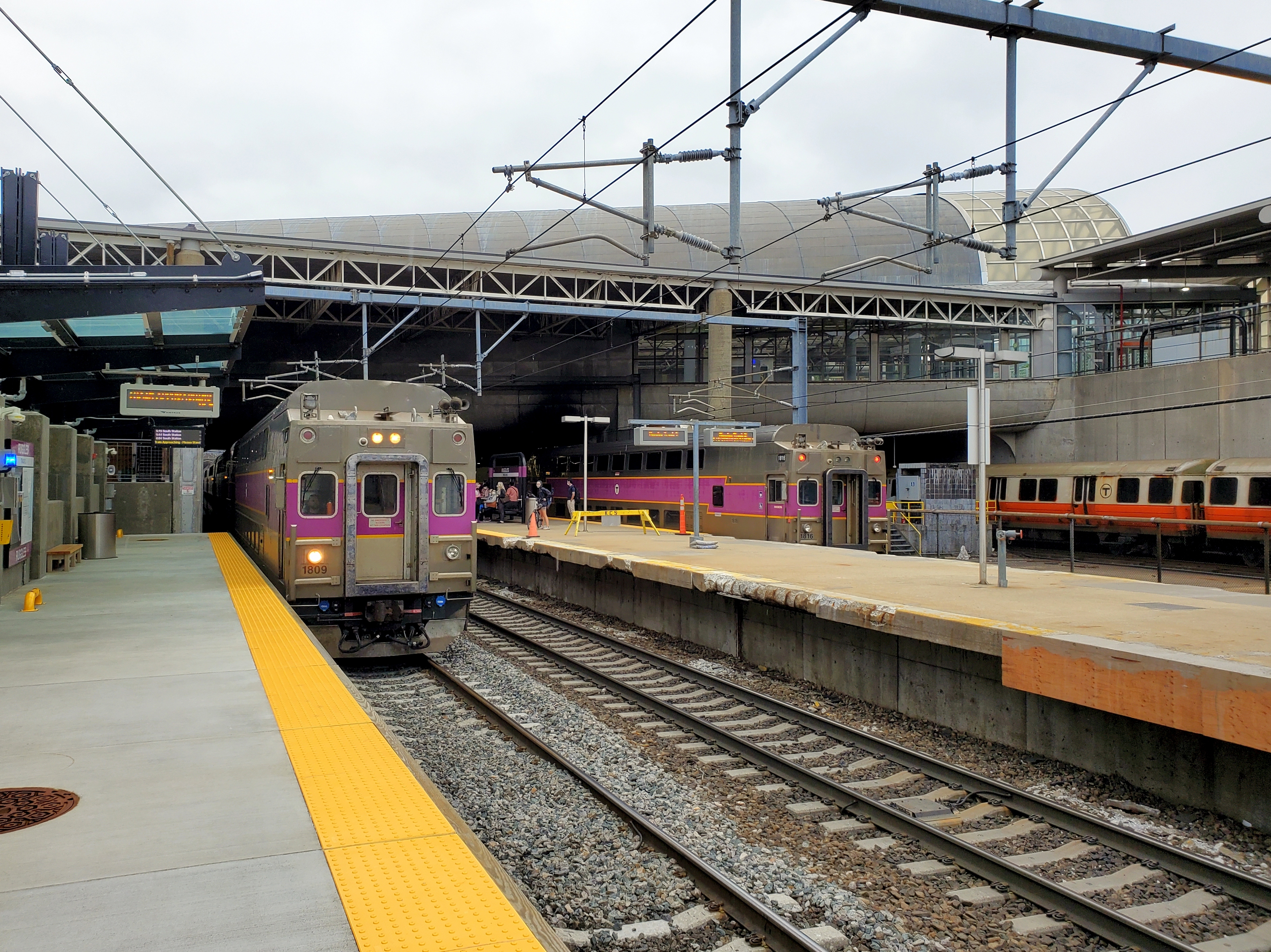
Two MBTA Commuter Rail trains on the NEC at Ruggles station

In addition to Amtrak, several commuter rail agencies operate passenger service using the NEC tracks:

==== Massachusetts Bay Transportation Authority (MBTA) operated by Keolis ====
- Providence/Stoughton Line: Wickford Junction–Boston
- Franklin/Foxboro Line: Readville–Boston
- Needham Line: Forest Hills–Boston
- Framingham/Worcester Line: Back Bay Station–Boston

The only section north of New York that does not have commuter service is the 43 miles between Wickford Junction and New London.

==== CT Rail ====
- Hartford Line: New Haven Union Station–New Haven-State Street
- Shore Line East: Stamford–New London, Connecticut

==== Metro-North Railroad (MNRR) ====
- New Haven Line: New Rochelle, New York–New Haven, Connecticut
- Danbury Branch: Stamford–Norwalk, Connecticut
- Waterbury Branch: Bridgeport–Stratford, Connecticut

==== Long Island Rail Road (LIRR) ====
- City Terminal Zone: Sunnyside Yard, Queens–New York

==== New Jersey Transit Rail Operations|New Jersey Transit (NJT) ====
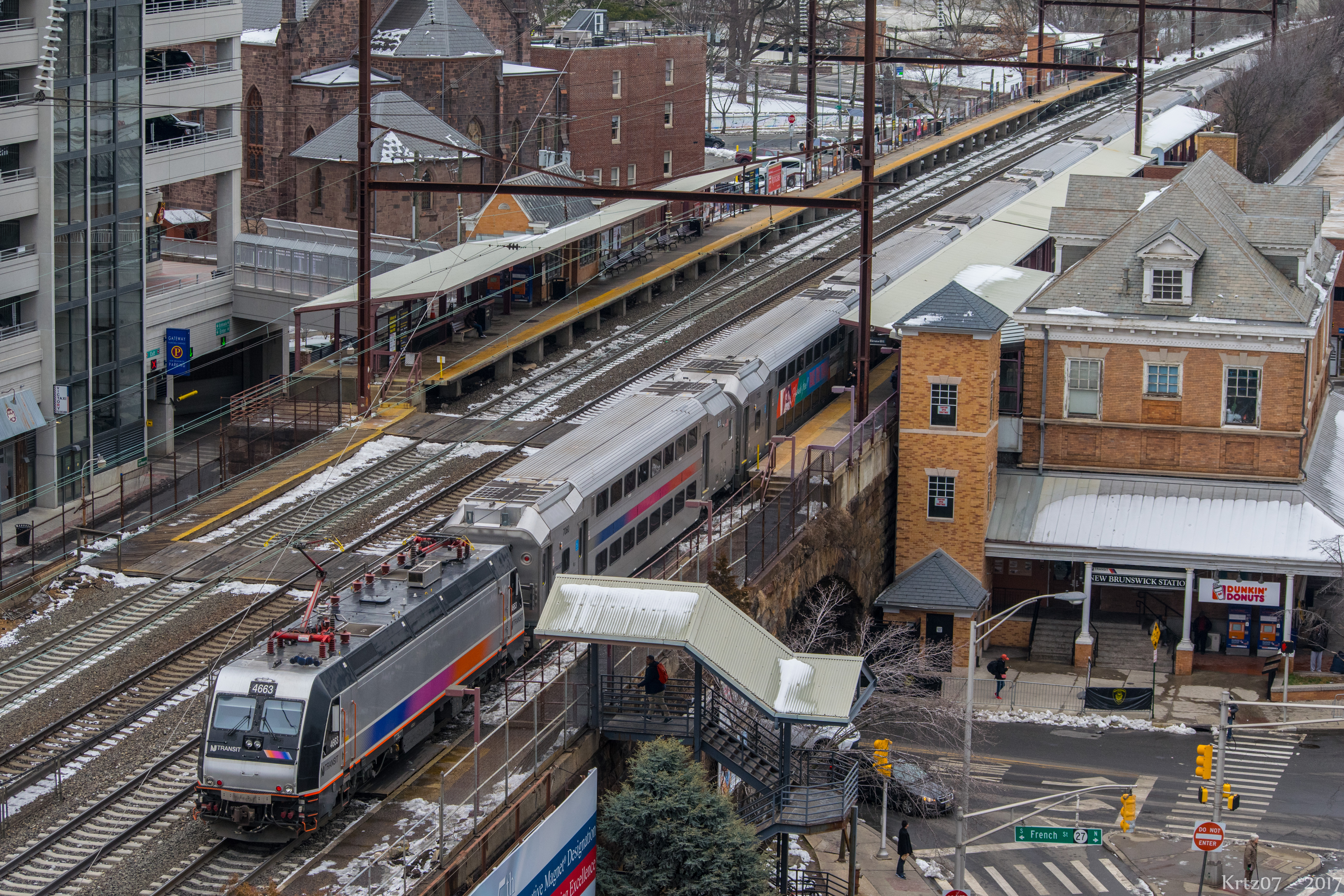
NJ Transit commuter train on the Northeast Corridor in New Brunswick, New Jersey

- Northeast Corridor Line: Trenton, NJ–New York
- North Jersey Coast Line: Rahway, NJ–New York
- Morristown Line, Gladstone Branch, Montclair-Boonton Line: Kearny Connection–New York
- Raritan Valley Line: Hunter Connection–New York
- Atlantic City Line: 30th Street Station–Frankford Junction

==== SEPTA ====
- Trenton Line: Philadelphia–Trenton, New Jersey
- Airport Line: 30th Street Station–Southwest Philadelphia
- Media/Wawa Line: 30th Street Station–Arsenal Junction
- Chestnut Hill West Line: 30th Street Station–North Philadelphia Station
- Wilmington/Newark Line: Newark, Delaware–Philadelphia

==== MARC Train ====
- Penn Line: Washington, D.C.–Perryville, Maryland, via Baltimore Penn Station

=== Freight services ===
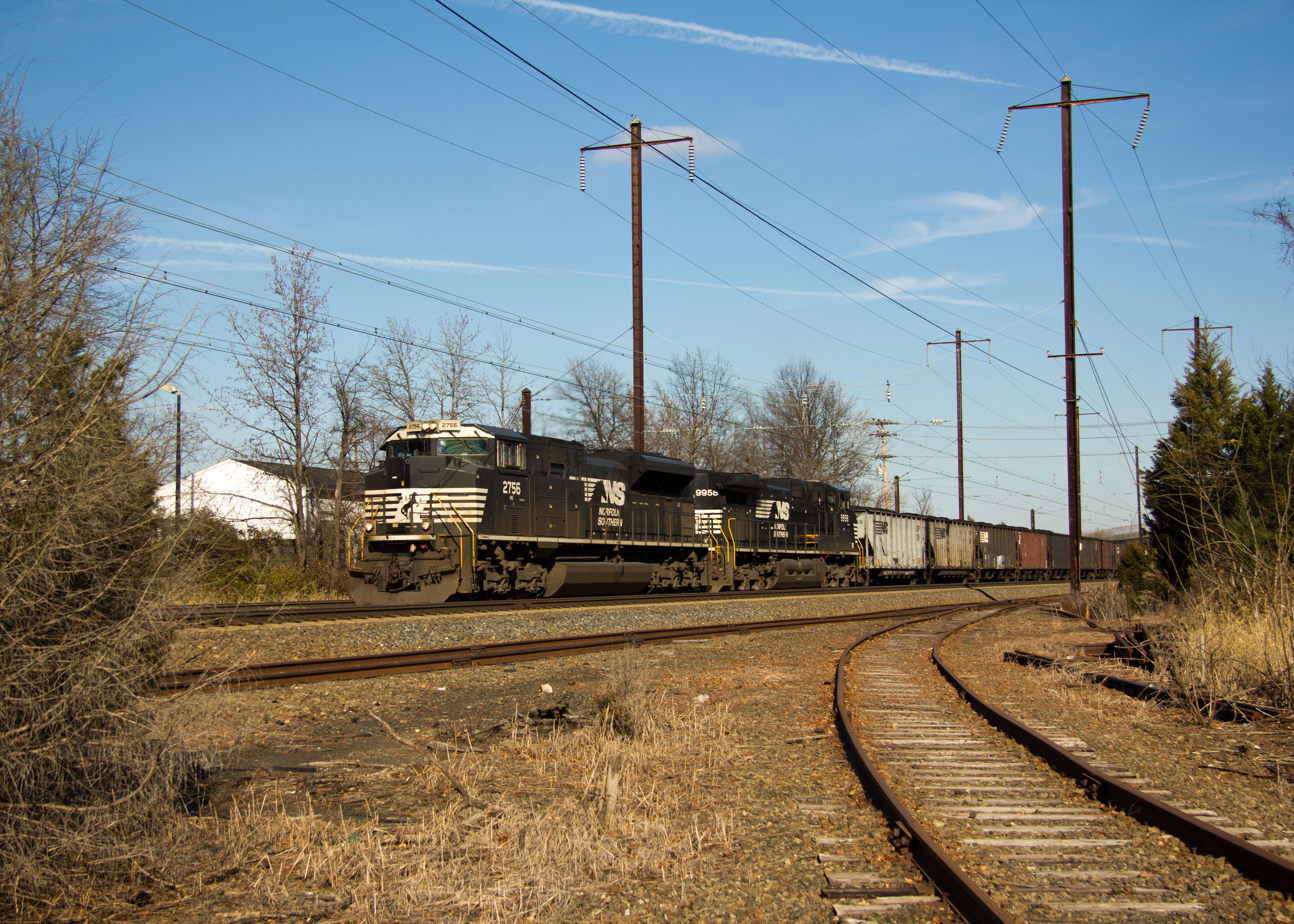
Norfolk Southern Railway freight operating on the NEC in Aberdeen, Maryland

Freight trains operate on parts of the NEC through trackage rights. Prior to the 1970s when Amtrak took over all passenger service, the NEC routinely saw lengthy freight trains sometimes numbering over one hundred cars traversing great lengths of the corridor. All freight operations ultimately came under the control of Penn Central in the late 1960s and later Conrail upon its formation in 1976, however Amtrak, whose ridership was steadily increasing began demanding heavier taxes for longer trains. Ultimately Conrail began reducing freight service to only small, local trains on certain sections of the corridor where most needed once longer freights began causing congestion and bigger delays with passenger service.

Currently, Norfolk Southern Railway operates over the line south of Philadelphia. CSX Transportation has rights from New York to New Haven; in Massachusetts; and in Maryland from Landover, where its Landover Subdivision joins the NEC, to Bowie, where its Pope's Creek Subdivision leaves it. Between Philadelphia and New York, Conrail Shared Assets Operations operates as a local switching and terminal company for CSX and Norfolk Southern. The Providence and Worcester Railroad operates local freight service from New Haven into Rhode Island and has overhead trackage rights from New Haven to New York over the Hell Gate Bridge to Fresh Pond Junction. Additionally, the Canadian Pacific Kansas City and the New York and Atlantic Railway both have trackage rights over the Hell Gate Bridge in order to connect with their own routes near New York.

== Future NEC projects ==
=== Frederick Douglass Tunnel ===
In January 2010, $60 million was allocated under the American Recovery and Reinvestment Act to begin studying possible replacements to the Baltimore and Potomac Tunnel, a major bottleneck on the Northeast Corridor between Baltimore Penn Station and Washington, D.C. Dating back to the 1860s, the design and age of the tunnel limits trains to 30 miles per hour (48 km/h), limits the installation of fire and safety systems, and requires costly maintenance to keep operational. The replacement tunnel is intended to allow speeds up to 100 miles per hour (160 km/h) as well as increasing capacity and safety. After preliminary and final design downselection in 2014 and 2016, respectively, and FRA approval in 2017, the replacement tunnel design was fully finalized in 2021, After receiving a $4.7 billion grant through the Infrastructure Investment and Jobs Act in November 2023, the construction contract was awarded to the Kiewit/J.F. Shea joint venture in February 2024 and construction work began later that month, with completion expected in 2035.

=== Gateway Program ===
In February 2011, Amtrak announced plans for the Gateway Project between Newark Penn Station and New York Penn Station. The planned project would create a high-speed alignment across the New Jersey Meadowlands and under the Hudson River, including the replacement of the Portal Bridge, a bottleneck.

=== Harold Interlocking ===
In May 2011, a $294.7-million federal grant was awarded to fix congestion at Harold Interlocking, the USA's second-busiest rail junction after Sunnyside Yard. The work will lay tracks to the New York Connecting Railroad right of way, allowing Amtrak trains arriving from or bound for New England to avoid NJ Transit and Long Island Rail Road trains. Financing for the project was jeopardized in July 2011 by the House of Representatives, which voted to divert the funding to unrelated projects. The project was then funded by FRA and the MTA. As of 2018, the interlocking is being reconstructed for LIRR's East Side Access project.

=== New Brunswick–Trenton high-speed upgrade ===
In August 2011, Congress obligated $450 million to a six-year project to add capacity on one of the busiest segments on the NEC in New Jersey. The project is designed to upgrade electrical power, signal systems and catenary wires on a 24-mile (39 km) section between New Brunswick and Trenton to improve reliability, increase speeds up to 160 mph (260 km/h), and support more frequent high-speed service. The improvements were scheduled to be completed in 2016, but have been delayed repeatedly. The track work is one of several projects planned for the "New Jersey Speedway" section of the NEC, which include a new station at North Brunswick, the Mid-Line Loop (a flyover for reversing train direction), and the re-construction of County Yard, to be done in coordination with NJ Transit. Acela trains began operating at speeds up to 150 mph (240 km/h) between Princeton Junction and New Brunswick in June 2022. With the planned introduction of the Avelia Liberty in 2025, speeds will increase to 160 miles per hour (260 km/h).

=== New trains for Acela ===
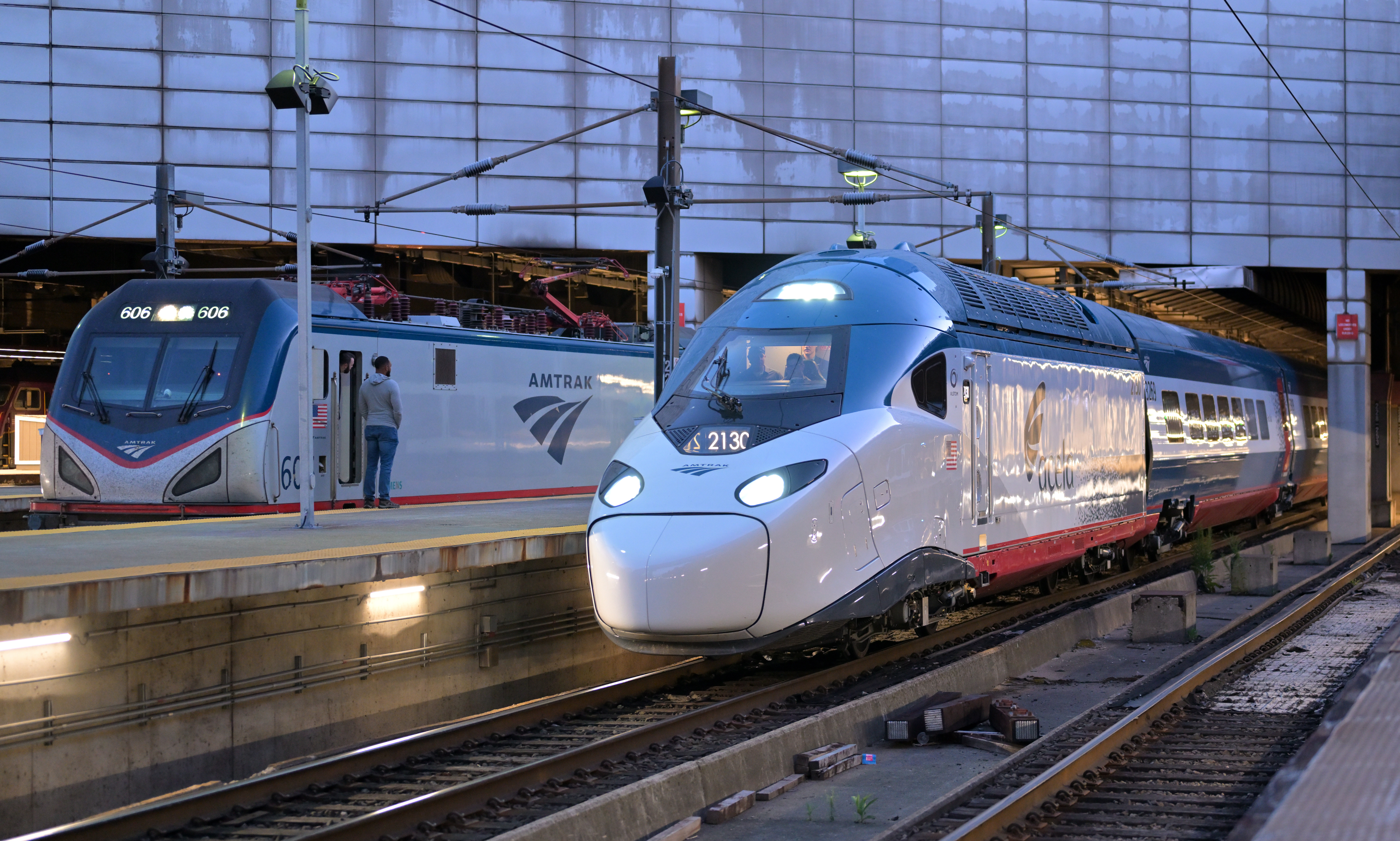
The first in-service Avelia Liberty trainset departing Boston South Station on August 28, 2025

On August 26, 2016, Vice President Joe Biden announced a $2.45 billion federal loan package to pay for new Acela equipment and upgrades to the NEC. The loans will finance 28 trainsets to replace the existing fleet. The trains are being built by Alstom in Hornell and Rochester, New York. Passenger service using the new trains had been expected to begin in 2024, but implementation was highly delayed. The first new trainsets entered service on August 28, 2025. The current fleet is expected to be retired when all the replacements have been delivered. Amtrak plans to repay the loans through increased NEC passenger revenue.

=== Connecticut speed upgrade ===
The Connecticut Department of Transportation plans to replace a three-mile stretch of track in Bridgeport, Stratford, and Milford, including the reconstruction of eight bridges (one in Bridgeport and seven in Stratford), catenary replacement, the reconstruction of one interlocking for high-speed track changes, and the construction of an additional new high-speed interlocking. These improvements will allow Metro-North and Amtrak trains to travel at 90 mph (140 km/h) instead of the current 70 mph (110 km/h) limit. The $385 million project is planned to begin in 2025, with completion estimated in December 2028.

=== Replacement of bridge over Housatonic River ===
In Milford and Stratford, Connecticut, the 1906 Devon Bridge over the Housatonic River causes delays and speed restrictions. The four-track bascule bridge is planned to be rehabilitated and eventually replaced, improving reliability and reducing travel times. The Connecticut Department of Transportation was awarded $119.3 million for interim repairs to the bridge in 2023. Repairs are scheduled to run from June 2025 until June 2027. A new bridge to replace the existing span is to be built from October 2030 to August 2036. Amtrak was awarded up to $246 million in Infrastructure Investment and Jobs Act funds in November 2023 for the design of a replacement for the span. Amtrak will contribute an additional $16 million, while the state of Connecticut will provide $45 million. The replacement bridge is being designed for a top speed of 70 mph (110 km/h), up from the current 40 mph (64 km/h) limit on the existing bridge.

=== Replacement of bridge over Hutchinson River ===
Amtrak is planning to replace the 1907 low-level movable rail Pelham Bay Bridge (just west of Pelham Bridge) over the Hutchinson River in the Bronx that has been limiting speed and train capacity. The goal is for a new bridge to support expanded service and speeds up to 70 mph (110 km/h). Construction is anticipated to begin in 2029, with completion expected in 2034. Funding for the replacement bridge will be provided by the Metropolitan Transportation Authority.

=== Replacement of bridge over Mianus River ===
In the November of 2024, the Connecticut Department of Transportation was awarded a $6.4 Million federal grant to explore options to find a replacement for the 1904-built Mianus River Railroad Bridge (also known as the Cos Cob Bridge) in Greenwich, Connecticut.

=== Replacement of bridge over Norwalk River ===
In May 2023, construction began to replace the 1896 Walk Bridge, a swing bridge over the Norwalk River in Norwalk, Connecticut. The current bridge is a frequent point of failure and a source of speed restrictions for Amtrak and Metro-North trains. The replacement bridge, a dual-span lift bridge, is expected to be completed in 2029. The replacement bridge is designed for a speed increase of 15 mph (24 km/h). Amtrak was awarded $465 million in Infrastructure Investment and Jobs Act funds in November 2023. Amtrak will contribute an additional $27 million, while the state of Connecticut will provide $87 million.

=== Replacement of bridge over Saugatuck River ===
In Westport, Connecticut, the 1905-built Saugatuck River Bridge over the Saugatuck River is planned to be replaced with a new span, as the current four-track bascule bridge is a source of delays and speed restrictions. Construction on the replacement bridge is expected to last from January 2030 to October 2033. The replacement bridge is being designed for a top speed of 90 mph (140 km/h), up from the current 45 mph (72 km/h) limit on the existing bridge. Amtrak was awarded up to $23.2 million in Infrastructure Investment and Jobs Act funds in November 2023 for early design of a replacement for the span. Amtrak will contribute an additional $1.6 million, while the state of Connecticut will provide $4.2 million.

== See also ==
- High-speed rail in the United States
- North Atlantic Rail
- Northeast Maglev
- Corridor (Via Rail)
