= Harry S Truman High School (Levittown, Pennsylvania) =

Location
- 3001 Green Lane; Levittown, Pennsylvania 19057; United States; 40.135°N 74.861°W

Information
- Former name: Woodrow Wilson High School
- School type: Public, high school
- School district: Bristol Township School District
- Superintendent: Michael Nitti
- CEEB code: 390435
- Principal: Jeff E
- Teaching staff: 117.00 (FTE)
- Grades: 9–12
- Enrollment: 1,698 (2023–2024)
- Student to teacher ratio: 14.51
- Colors: Black and gold
- Mascot: Tiger
- Website: truman.bristoltwpsd.org

Harry S Truman High School (often referred to as HST or simply Truman), formerly Woodrow Wilson High School, is a public high school located in Levittown, Pennsylvania. The school is a part of the Bristol Township School District in Bristol Township, Bucks County, Pennsylvania, and is its only high school. It was named after US President Harry S. Truman. The principal is Jon Craig.

== Academics ==
=== AP level courses ===
Harry S Truman High School has historically offered the various Advanced Placement (AP) level classes, including U.S. history, U.S. government and politics, chemistry, English literature, statistics, and calculus AB (though BC has been offered to particularly advanced students). The school also offers Project Lead the Way courses that result as college credits. Those include Intro to Digital Electronics, Intro to Engineering Design, Principles of Engineering & Civil & Architectural Engineering. HST won an AP Honor Roll award for their distinguished scholars for the years 2011-2012, besting other school districts in the area.

=== Language instruction ===
Truman offers five years of instruction in Italian and Spanish. It also has an English as a Second Language (ESL) program and often hosts international students who are studying abroad in the United States.

== NJROTC ==
Harry S Truman HS was a pilot school for the United States Navy's Junior Reserve Officers Training Corps program. The Harry S Truman NJROTC unit was active from 1968 until 1996. It was the first JROTC unit to admit female cadets.

== Activities ==
=== Debate ===
Truman has a speech and debate team. The team competes in the National Speech and Debate Association (Valley Forge district), the Philadelphia Catholic Forensic League, the Southeastern Pennsylvania Debate League, the Pennsylvania High School Speech League (district 12), and at numerous national and regional invitationals.

=== Drama ===
Truman's drama program was led by Louis Volpe for about 45 years until his retirement in June 2013. In October 2012, the Bristol Township School Board approved a resolution that would name Truman's auditorium after Volpe. After the departure of Volpe, Tracey Gatte assumed the position of director after being assistant director for several years.

The program chose to pioneer Les Misérables for high school use in 2001. They also performed the pilot of the student editions of Rent and Spring Awakening. Other Truman productions have included Beauty and the Beast, Aida, Epic Proportions, Godspell, Jesus Christ Superstar, Equus, Found a Peanut, Grease, and in 2019, they performed the first ever highschool production of Kinky Boots.

Author Michael Sokolove wrote the book Drama High, which focuses on the life of Lou Volpe and history of the Truman theater program. Drama High was adapted into the 2018 NBC series Rise.

== Sports ==
All Truman teams compete in the Suburban One League of Levittown, Pennsylvania.

=== Field hockey ===
Opponent teams include: Pennsbury, Neshaminy, Abington, and both Council Rock teams.

=== Football ===
Truman football teams have "strong" rivalries with Conwell-Egan, Pennsbury, and Bensalem. During the 2017 season, The Tigers had made it to the playoffs for the first time since 1993. Lacrosse

Truman's lacrosse team was founded during the 2000–01 academic year. It has both a varsity and junior varsity squad.

=== Bowling ===
Truman’s female bowling team won the SOL Title for the 2016–17, 2017–18, 2018–19, and 2019–20 years and has been undefeated the last 3 years. They have also won the state championship in 2019.

== Notable alumni ==
- Susan Barnett – American television news anchor (born 1972)
- David Blay Jr. – American football player (born 2003)
- Rick DeJesus, American rock singer in the band Adelitas Way
- Kevin Ingram (arena football) – American football player (born 1977)
- Earl "The Twirl" Williams – American-Israeli professional basketball player (born 1951)
