= Rise (American TV series) =

2018 musical drama television series

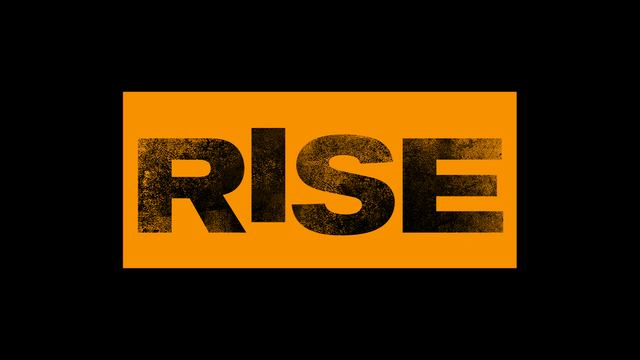
- Genre: Drama; Musical; Teen drama
- Created by: Jason Katims
- Based on: Drama High by Michael Sokolove
- Starring: Josh Radnor; Marley Shelton; Auliʻi Cravalho; Damon J. Gillespie; Shirley Rumierk; Joe Tippett; Ted Sutherland; Amy Forsyth; Rarmian Newton; Casey Johnson; Taylor Richardson; Rosie Perez
- Composer: Will Bates
- Country of origin: United States
- Original language: English
- No. of seasons: 1
- No. of episodes: 10

Production
- Executive producers: Jason Katims; Jeffrey Seller; Flody Suarez; Michelle Lee; Mike Cahill
- Camera setup: Single-camera
- Running time: 44 minutes
- Production companies: Seller Suarez Productions; True Jack Productions; Universal Television

Original release
- Network: NBC
- Release: March 13 – May 15, 2018

Rise is an American musical drama television series created by Jason Katims, starring Josh Radnor in the lead role as Lou Mazzuchelli. The series is inspired by the 2013 book Drama High by Michael Sokolove, which focused on real-life teacher Lou Volpe and the famed theater program at Harry S Truman High School in Bucks County, Pennsylvania.

The television pilot was ordered to series by NBC on May 4, 2017, along with The Brave, making both series the first regular series orders by the network for the 2017–18 United States network television schedule. The first season consisted of 10 episodes, and debuted on March 13, 2018.

On May 11, 2018, NBC canceled the show after one season.

== Cast and characters ==
=== Main ===
- Josh Radnor as Lou "Mr. Mazzu" Mazzuchelli, an English teacher at Stanton High who wants to reinvent the school's drama presentations. He takes over the Stanton drama club and pushes to perform Spring Awakening.
- Marley Shelton as Gail Mazzuchelli, Lou's wife who supports his plan of taking over the drama department of his school
- Rosie Perez as Tracey Wolfe, the assistant director who was previously offered the director job before being replaced by Lou, though she stays on and supports Lou
- Auliʻi Cravalho as Lilette Suarez, a high school student and member of the Stanton drama club cast in the lead role of Wendla, who has problems with her mother at home
- Damon J. Gillespie as Robbie Thorne, the starting quarterback of the Stanton football team, who is cast in the lead role of Melchior; he also visits and takes care of his mother at a hospital.
- Shirley Rumierk as Vanessa Suarez, Lilette's mother who has an affair with the football coach and keeps secrets from her daughter
- Joe Tippett as Coach Sam Strickland, the headstrong and strict Stanton football coach who values sports over the arts
- Ted Sutherland as Simon Saunders, a student born into a very religious conservative family, who is usually cast in the lead roles in the Stanton club theater productions, but later is cast in the role of Hänschen
- Amy Forsyth as Gwen Strickland, Coach Strickland's daughter and member of Stanton drama club, who has problems at home due to her father's affair; she is usually cast in the lead female roles, but is cast as supporting character Ilse.
- Rarmian Newton as Maashous Evers, a homeless student who is the lighting designer for the drama club
- Casey Johnson as Gordy Mazzuchelli, Lou's son, who is having problems with alcohol
- Taylor Richardson as Kaitlin Mazzuchelli, Lou's daughter

=== Recurring ===
- Ellie Desautels as Michael Hallowell, a transgender student, previously a member of Stanton's choir and now a new member of Stanton's drama club, cast in the role of Moritz.
- Shannon Purser as Annabelle Bowman, a member of Stanton's drama club
- Sean Grandillo as Jeremy Travers, a new member of Stanton's drama club, cast in the role of Ernst, Simon's partner in the play
- Erin Kommor as Sasha Foley, a student in the drama troupe who gets pregnant, cast as Martha in the play.
- Nacho Tambunting as Francis, a student in the drama troupe, cast in the role of Georg.
- Katherine Reis as Jolene, a student in the drama troupe
- Rachel Hilson as Harmon Curtis, a student in the drama troupe
- Alexis Molnar as Lexi, a student in the drama troupe
- Tiffany Mann as Cheryl, a student in the drama troupe
- Caroline Pluta as Violet, a student in the drama troupe
- Sergio King as Clark, a student in the drama troupe
- Jennifer Ferrin as Denise Strickland, Gwen's mother who serves as costumer for Spring Awakening
- Stephanie J. Block as Patricia Saunders, Simon's mother
- Stephen Plunkett as Robert Saunders, Simon's father
- Mark Tallman as Detrell Thorne, Robbie's father
- Diallo Riddle as Andy Kranepool, a teacher at Stanton who is attracted to Tracey
- Tom Riis Farrell as Mr Baer, the Stanton High Band director
- Niloy Alam as Sundeep, the Stanton High guitarist
- Billy Joe Kiessling as the Stanton High violist
- Sumi Yu as the Stanton High violinist
- Pance Pony as the Stanton High cellist
- Liam Herbert as the Stanton High acoustic guitar
- Chandler Swift as Stanton High cheerleader

== Episodes ==
No.	Title	Directed by	Written by	Original release date	U.S. viewers (millions)
1	"Pilot"	Mike Cahill	Jason Katims	March 13, 2018	5.50
Stanton High School's English teacher Mr. Lou Mazzuchelli always tries to inspire his students, but also wants to inspire them to the art of theater. The principal lets him be the new director of Stanton's drama club, despite previously offering the role to long time assistant director Tracey Wolfe. Although displeased, Tracey stays as assistant director, persuaded by Lou's determination to change the drama club. Spring Awakening is chosen as the new play; Lilette is cast as Wendla, Gwen as Ilse, and Simon as Hänschen. Lou lets Robbie Thorne, Stanton's football star, retake a test if he auditions for the play; Coach Strickland opposes but concedes. Robbie is cast as Melchior (the lead male role). Lou urges Robbie to fully commit to the play; Robbie does so after his mother persuades him to do what he wants. Later, at a meeting, the principal forces Lou to resign as club director due to the content of his play, reinstates Tracey, and assigns a new play. But the drama club—and Tracey—support Lou, protesting outside by burning theater costumes; Robbie threatens to quit football unless Lou and his play stay; the principal and Coach Strickland concede, as the bonfire continues.
2	"Most of all to Dream"	Rosemary Rodriguez	Jason Katims	March 20, 2018	5.39
After Lou's district meeting speech, Tracey interrupts the football department's presentation to appeal for funding—with some success. Maashous, the homeless lighting student, stays with the Mazzuchellis. Robbie, called to practice football on drama rehearsal day, forgets his lines. Lilette arranges to meet Robbie at night to practice, but he practices football instead. They run lines and bond on her work break. But one day she sees him kiss another girl. Gordy, after a car accident and attitude change, insists he quit drinking—but liquor is found in his locker. The Mazzuchellis want to send Gordy to rehab, but Coach Strickland offers to work with Gordy. Simon ("Hänschen") does not kiss Jeremy ("Ernst") per the script at practice. Jeremy arranges to study with Simon on Saturday night, but Simon goes on a date with Annabelle instead. Lilette admits her mother's affair with Coach Strickland to his daughter Gwen. Gwen ("Ilse", instead of her usual lead role) uses her pain to practice "The Song of Purple Summer", as Lou wants. Michael asks to change in the boy's dressing room. Simon's parents, disapproving of the play (although their priest trusts Simon if he trusts the director), enroll Simon in a preparatory school.
3	"What Flowers May Bloom"	Rosemary Rodriguez	Kerry Ehrin	March 27, 2018	4.48
Lou's design vision clashes with Tracey's budget. Simon announces he is leaving Stanton High. Vanessa terminates her affair with Coach Strickland. Gordy, kept busy by Coach Strickland, cannot share a room with Maashous, and isolates from the family. Lou finds Maashous' foster mother sitting in her car, isolating from her foster children. Lilette and Robbie visit his mother in the hospital. Lou tries talking to Simon's parents; the father is adamant, but the mother later meets Lou with questions.
4	"Victory Party"	Patrick Norris	Russel Friend & Garrett Lerner	April 3, 2018	4.42
Andy Kranepool's brother fixes an overload in the lighting board. Andy asks Lou if he should ask Tracey out. Tracey accepts, but on the date is angry when she thinks Lou set it up, but Andy assures her it was his own idea. Robbie invites Lilette to the post-game "victory party"; Lilette invites Simon. Simon warns Robbie against hurting Lillete. Stanton High loses a big football game; the party is held after the game anyway. Robbie's father tells Lilette the importance of Robbie excelling in football. Simon brings the drama club to the party. When some football players hassle Michael, Robbie intervenes, thus alienating the rest of the team. Afterwards he upsets Lilette and she leaves the party, but Robbie later goes to her house to apologise, and they share their first kiss. Gordy, at his cousin's house, sneaks out to the football party and drinks liquor, and is defiant towards Lou. Simon's mother thinks they should reconsider Simon's school transfer, but his father disagrees.
5	"We've All Got Our Junk"	Patrick Norris	Ian Deitchman & Kristin Robinson	April 10, 2018	4.40
Gordy is found by his parents and a fight ensues; some ground rules are laid out; Lou later tells Gordy about Gordy's alcoholic grandfather. Meanwhile, some relationships are tested. Gwen's parents are getting divorced. Robbie and Lilette are torn as to whether they should remain friends or get more serious about their relationship, though Robbie's father disapproves of Lilette. But they decide to be together, which in turn helps with their performance for the musical's love scene. Musical personalities collide during rehearsals, but both instructors come to an agreement after listening to instrumental versions of "My Junk". Simon is allowed to return to Stanton High. Lilette's mother Vanessa violently retaliates against her boss' continual inappropriate touching.
6	"Bring Me Stanton"	Allison Liddi-Brown	Denise Hahn	April 17, 2018	4.21
Lou and Gail rid their household of alcohol. Since Lilette's work schedule has changed, play practice is held later. Coach Strickland refuses to let Robbie play unless he quits the show, citing his poor attitude and failure to know the plays. Sasha tells Tracey she is pregnant. Simon continues pursuing Annabelle to avoid Jeremy, who has feelings for Simon. Lou releases the students early from rehearsal after complaints about upcoming midterms. Vanessa, despite limited finances, plans to sue her former boss for sexual harassment. Lou destroys the set model the next day, and instead asks the students to salvage meaningful artifacts from around town. Some students unsuccessfully attempt to steal a sign from the old steel mill. Gwen distracts the police so the others can escape; her father, Coach Strickland, arranges for Gwen not to be charged. Gwen criticizes him for his affair with Vanessa. Robbie visits Lou, who encourages Robbie in both acting and football. The next day, Coach Strickland notices Vanessa working at his motel. The cast members bring a stained glass church window, signs, boards, and other salvaged items; Coach Strickland and others bring the steel mill sign.
7	"This Will God Willing Get Better"	Peter Sollett	Jason Katims	April 24, 2018	4.20
Robbie continues to be benched by Coach Strickland. Sasha receives cash from another high schooler, and is confronted by Michael. A run through of the play is chaotic. Coach Strickland and Vanessa resume their affair. Lou and Gail bring Gordy to alcohol addiction treatment. Simon continues talking to Annabelle. Sasha is confronted again during play practice. Maashous' mother is allowed to meet with Maashous. The ticket sales for Spring Awakening are low; Lou discovers ticket sales fund the following year's theater budget. Lou talks to Robbie about his role. Jeremy is rejected by Simon. Maashous attempts to fix the dryer after breaking it, and gets caught. During a play dinner, Michael fights with Sasha's boyfriend. Maashous tries to run away, but is persuaded to stay home. Gordy's treatment seems to work. Robbie continually underperforms, and leaves stage after Lou's criticism. Lou leaves rehearsal, despite Tracey's attempts to convince him to stay. Gwen fits a nose ring and skips rehearsal to be with Gordy, and they sleep together on the beach. Simon admits to Annabelle that he was befriending, and not really in love.
8	"The Petition"	Nestor Carbonell	Jason Katims	May 1, 2018	3.73
Lou is vilified by a radio show caller for taking Robbie away from football. Lou discovers ticket sales for the play have risen, due to a scandalous video posted on the school website; the principal demands the person responsible take the video down. Parents sign a petition regarding the play content. Maashous asks Mr. and Mrs. Mazzuchelli to take him to see his mother, who is out of prison. Sasha and Michael go to the doctor and have a sonogram. Lou lets Robbie off rehearsals for a week to focus on football; Robbie leads a victory. Gwen is still angry with her father. Lilette discovers Vanessa's affair continues, argues with her about it, and claims she is not responsible to take care of her mother; Vanessa walks out of their home. Robbie takes Lou to visit Robbie's mother. Simon's parents argue after Robert forged Patricia's name on the petition. The principal asks Tracey to take over and tone down the play, and then offers her the drama department.
9	"Totally Hosed"	Chris Koch	Jason Katims	May 8, 2018	3.75
Vanessa is still out of the apartment when the rent is past due. Robbie defends Lilette when the apartment manager hassles her about the rent. The drama club attempts a toned down version of the play, which the principal approves. Gordy helps the drama club as community service for his recovery program. Simon's sister fears their parents will divorce. Robbie's mother's health deteriorates, and the plan is to make her more comfortable.
10	"Opening Night"	Michael Weaver	Jason Katims	May 15, 2018	4.10
Vanessa returns home, saying she has a job in Philadelphia. Coach Strickland gets a place and tells Gwen he and her mother are splitting custody of Gwen. When the principal wants the beating scene taken out, Lou decides to do the original version anyway, with the students' support. When the principal orders the lights turned off, Tracey intercedes, saying the students are acting their hearts out. The superintendent likes the show, but plans to cut the drama club to appease angry parents. Robbie's mother sees the show; Robbie's father is the first to stand in a standing ovation. Lilette tells Robbie that she is moving to Philadelphia.

== Music ==
The show had cast members perform songs from Spring Awakening, including the new song "All You Desire" that Spring Awakening creators Duncan Sheik and Steven Sater wrote specifically for the show.

=== Rise Season 1: The Album ===
On May 11, 2018, a soundtrack from the series was released. It included all Spring Awakening songs performed by the cast, as well as covers of Ed Sheeran's "Perfect", Alessia Cara's "Scars to Your Beautiful", Fun's "Carry On" and Macklemore's "Glorious". The album consists of 24 tracks.

== Reception ==
=== Critical response ===
The review aggregator website Rotten Tomatoes reported an approval rating of 59% based on 41 reviews, with an average rating of 6.22/10. Metacritic, which uses a weighted average, assigned the series a score of 59 out of 100 based on 27 reviews, indicating "mixed or average reviews". Out magazine expressed concern about straightwashing, saying that the changing of the original book's real-life source, about a gay man, into a straight man, was "cultural theft and [gay] erasure" of what "should have been the story of a complicated LGBTQ hero".

In 2020, Rosie Perez gave her thoughts about the show's cancellation: "I think that it didn't have enough time, but I also think, to be fair, it was a little too over sentimental. I think that's what hurt the show. Everyone kept comparing it to Glee, and that hurt the show, as well."

=== Ratings ===
Viewership and ratings per episode of Rise
No.	Title	Air date	Rating (18–49)	Viewers (millions)	DVR (18–49)	DVR viewers (millions)	Total (18–49)	Total viewers (millions)
1	"Pilot"	March 13, 2018	1.2/5	5.50	0.7	2.88	1.9	8.38
2	"Most of All to Dream"	March 20, 2018	1.1/4	5.39	—N/a	—N/a	—N/a	—N/a
3	"What Flowers May Bloom"	March 27, 2018	0.8/3	4.48	—N/a	—N/a	—N/a	—N/a
4	"Victory Party"	April 3, 2018	0.8/3	4.42	—N/a	—N/a	—N/a	—N/a
5	"We've Got All Our Junk"	April 10, 2018	0.8/3	4.40	—N/a	—N/a	—N/a	—N/a
6	"Bring Me Stanton"	April 17, 2018	0.8/3	4.21	—N/a	—N/a	—N/a	—N/a
7	"This Will God Willing Get Better"	April 24, 2018	0.7/3	4.20	—N/a	—N/a	—N/a	—N/a
8	"The Petition"	May 1, 2018	0.7/3	3.73	—N/a	—N/a	—N/a	—N/a
9	"Totally Hosed"	May 8, 2018	0.7/3	3.75	—N/a	—N/a	—N/a	—N/a
10	"Opening Night"	May 15, 2018	0.7/3	4.10	—N/a	—N/a	—N/a	—N/a
