= Lower Bucks Christian Academy =

Coordinates: 40.13644°N 74.85426°W

Lower Bucks Christian Academy was a private Christian school in the Greater Philadelphia area, serving grades K-12.

In 1990 the school had 425 students. The school leased the Benjamin Franklin Junior High School facility in Bristol Township for a period of over 12 years, prior to 1990. That year the Bristol Township School District denied renewal of the lease since it wished to repurpose the building as an elementary school. Therefore, Lower Bucks Christian began to lose students and teachers who perceived the school as being unstable.

Rev. Donald McCall, the head of the academy, was the chairperson of the Langhorne Terrace Baptist Church in Middletown. McCall proposed holding classes on the church property, but area residents protested the plan. Originally the zoning board of Middletown stated that it would not allow the church to house the school, and according to McCall many parents decided not to re-enroll their children at that point. The church appealed, and in August 1991 the Middletown township finally granted the school the right to use the church space, but because so few students were remaining, the school never reopened that fall.
