= Delaware River–Turnpike Toll Bridge =

Bridge linking Pennsylvania and New Jersey turnpikes

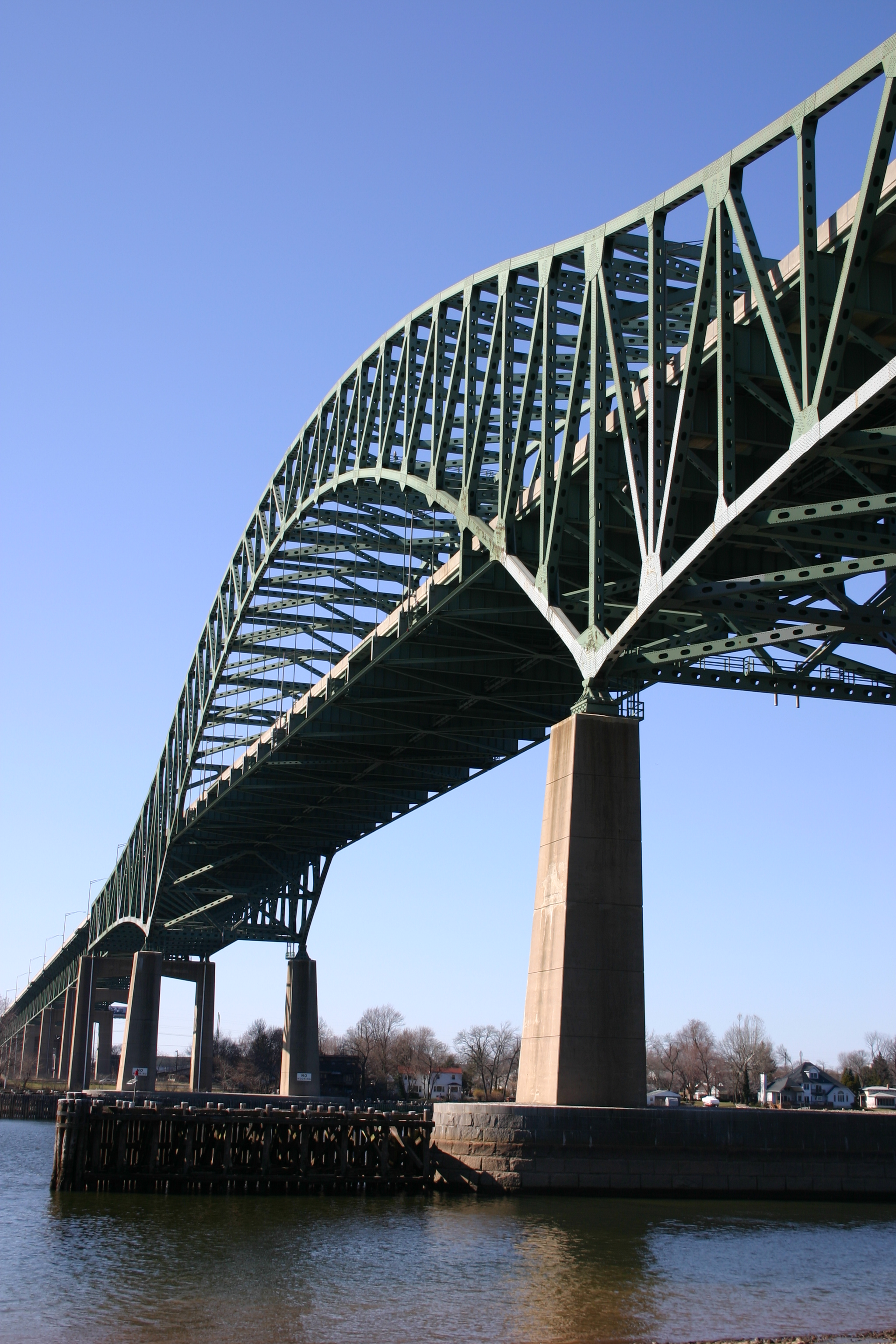
- Delaware River Turnpike Bridge from the east bank of the Delaware River
- Coordinates: 40°07′01″N 74°49′50″W
- Carries: 4 lanes of I-95
- Crosses: Delaware River
- Locale: Bristol Township, Pennsylvania and Burlington Township, New Jersey
- Official name: Delaware River–Turnpike Toll Bridge
- Other name: Delaware River Bridge
- Maintained by: Pennsylvania Turnpike Commission and New Jersey Turnpike Authority
- ID number: 097276990359000

Characteristics
- Design: Through arch bridge
- Total length: 6,751 ft (2,058 m)
- Width: 90 ft (27 m)
- Longest span: 682 ft (208 m)
- Clearance below: 135 ft (41 m)

History
- Constructed by: American Bridge Division of US Steel
- Construction start: January 15, 1954
- Opened: May 25, 1956 (70 years ago)

Statistics
- Daily traffic: 42,000 (2017)
- Toll: West/southbound: $7.98 for cars with E-ZPass $10.60 for cars without E-ZPass

Location
- Interactive map of Delaware River–Turnpike Toll Bridge

The Delaware River–Turnpike Toll Bridge is a four-lane, steel through arch bridge crossing the Delaware River between Burlington Township, New Jersey, and Bristol Township, Bucks County, Pennsylvania, United States. As a part of Interstate 95 (I-95), it is a major highway link between Philadelphia and New York City. The bridge also connects the Pennsylvania Turnpike's east-west mainline with the main trunk of the New Jersey Turnpike, via the Pearl Harbor Memorial Turnpike Extension (formerly known as the Pennsylvania Extension). Tolls are collected only in the west/southbound direction via electronic toll collection.

== History ==
The bridge was built by both the Pennsylvania Turnpike Commission (PTC) and the New Jersey Turnpike Authority (NJTA) when the PTC completed the "Delaware River Extension" of the Pennsylvania Turnpike between Valley Forge and Bristol Township in 1955, while the NJTA built the 118-mile (190 km) NJ Turnpike between Penns Grove and Ridgefield Park between 1950 and 1952. While the Pennsylvania Turnpike itself predates its New Jersey counterpart by over 10 years (the original Irwin-Carlisle section opened in 1940), the expansion of the Pennsylvania Turnpike to a cross-state highway was put on hold for the duration of World War II.

Starting with the upsurge of automobile traffic in 1946, the Pennsylvania Turnpike expanded from the original 110-mile (180 km) highway west from Irwin to the Ohio border and east from Carlisle to Valley Forge. At the same time, New Jersey, lacking a high-speed corridor, undertook the building of the New Jersey Turnpike under the auspices of then-Governor of New Jersey Alfred E. Driscoll. In order to provide a high-speed, low-interruption route from New York City to the Midwest, both the PTC and the NJTA undertook the building of the Delaware River–Turnpike Toll Bridge (known locally as the "Turnpike Connector Bridge") to connect the two highways. This required an amendment to the Pennsylvania Constitution to allow the state to enter into the agreement. A local AAA chapter spearheaded a failed effort to have the bridge named after William Penn.

To maintain the "high-speed, low-interruption" characteristics ("low interruption" referring to the few stops needed to pay tolls or fuel up at the numerous full-service plazas on both routes), the new bridge was designed from the beginning as a high-level crossing. This sharply contrasts with the Tacony–Palmyra Bridge and the Burlington–Bristol Bridge located downstream as they are both drawbridges, and are subject to frequent openings to allow large ships up and down stream (all other bridges downstream from the Delaware River–Turnpike Toll Bridge are high level crossings).

In May 1998, the Pennsylvania Turnpike Commission began a $17 million project to re-deck the Pennsylvania part of the bridge and place a Jersey wall. Emergency shoulders were added, but the bridge's capacity was altered from six to four lanes. At the Pennsylvania approach, new toll lanes were added to accommodate the toll collection system. In 2001, the year after the project's completion, the other half of the bridge began to be re-decked by the New Jersey Turnpike Authority.

In 2011, the NJTA and PTC undertook an investigation of the existing suspender system on the main span. Based on destructive testing of suspenders from the similar Newark Bay Bridge, consultants HNTB determined that the Delaware River bridge's suspenders had limited remaining service life and needed to be replaced. At each suspender location, the load from each original 4-inch-diameter (10 cm) wire rope was transferred into a set of four new 2-inch-diameter (5.1 cm) wire ropes, after which the original suspender was cut. The project was completed in August 2013.

On January 3, 2016, the Pennsylvania Turnpike Commission implemented cashless tolling via either E-ZPass or toll-by-plate, which uses automatic license plate recognition to take a photo of the vehicle's license plate and mail a bill to the vehicle owner. The toll is collected only from traffic crossing into Pennsylvania, as with the other bridges across the Delaware River.

On January 20, 2017, the bridge was closed after a fracture was discovered in a steel component. On February 3, 2017, Pennsylvania Turnpike officials announced that the bridge would remain closed until at least April 2017. The failure was located in an I-beam located approximately 80 ft (24 m) above ground on the Pennsylvania side and caused the bridge to drop by about 1 in (25 mm). Steel plates were installed as a temporary patch to stabilize the bridge and prevent further movement. The Assistant Chief Engineer for the Pennsylvania Turnpike Commission stated that ..."the crack likely was caused by a combination of factors, including age and plug welds that were commonly used in the 1950s to fill mistakenly drilled holes." The bridge reopened to traffic on March 9, 2017, with unseasonably warm weather helping speed up work in repairing the bridge.

On September 22, 2018, the bridge became part of Interstate 95 when the Pennsylvania Turnpike/Interstate 95 Interchange Project's first components of construction were completed. Previously, the Pennsylvania side of the bridge and the adjacent turnpike was designated Interstate 276.

== Maintenance ==
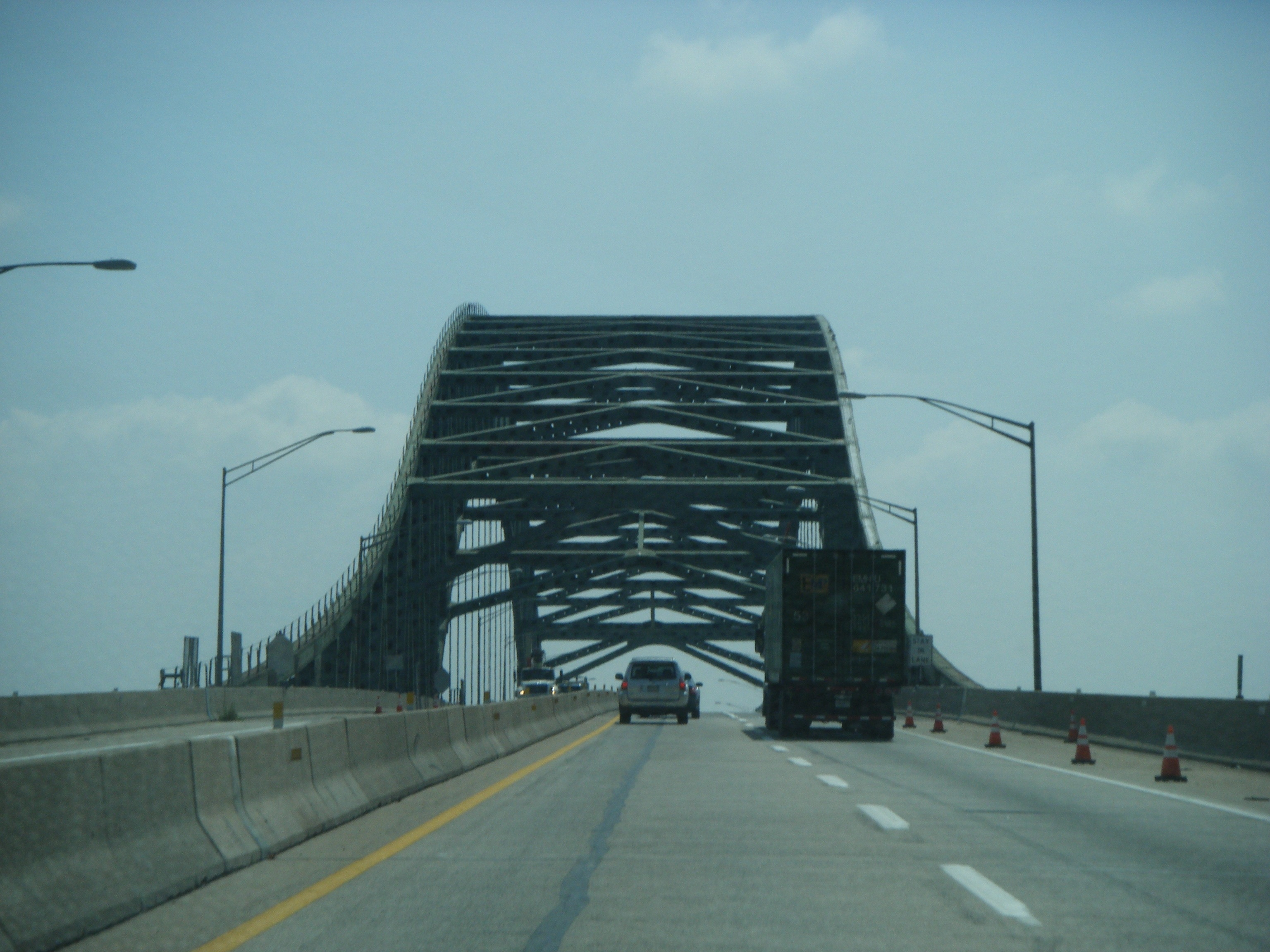
Eastbound across the bridge

The Turnpike Connector bridge is operated jointly by the PTC and the NJTA, neither of which is subject to the interstate rules and regulations of the other dual-state authorities — Delaware River Port Authority (DRPA); Burlington County Bridge Commission (BCBC); Delaware River and Bay Authority (DRBA); and the Delaware River Joint Toll Bridge Commission (DRJTBC) — which operate nearly all other bridges across the Delaware River (except for the Dingman's Ferry Bridge, which is privately owned). Each state is responsible for its half of the bridge up to the state line (as evident in a recent redecking project in which the PTC redecked its half of the bridge with fresh concrete first, with the NJTA following later in a separate project).

== Future construction ==
The final component of the direct interchange project between the Pennsylvania Turnpike and Interstate 95 in Bristol Township is the replacement of the Delaware River Bridge. As originally planned, a second, parallel span of the bridge identical in appearance to the original 1956 span was to be constructed. However, in March 2020 the New Jersey Turnpike Authority announced in their capital improvement plan that the 1956 span will be replaced and a new study will be formed to determine the design of the new roadways. The new bridge is not planned to begin construction until at least 2025.

== See also ==
- List of crossings of the Delaware River
