= Newark Bay Bridge =

Bridge in New Jersey

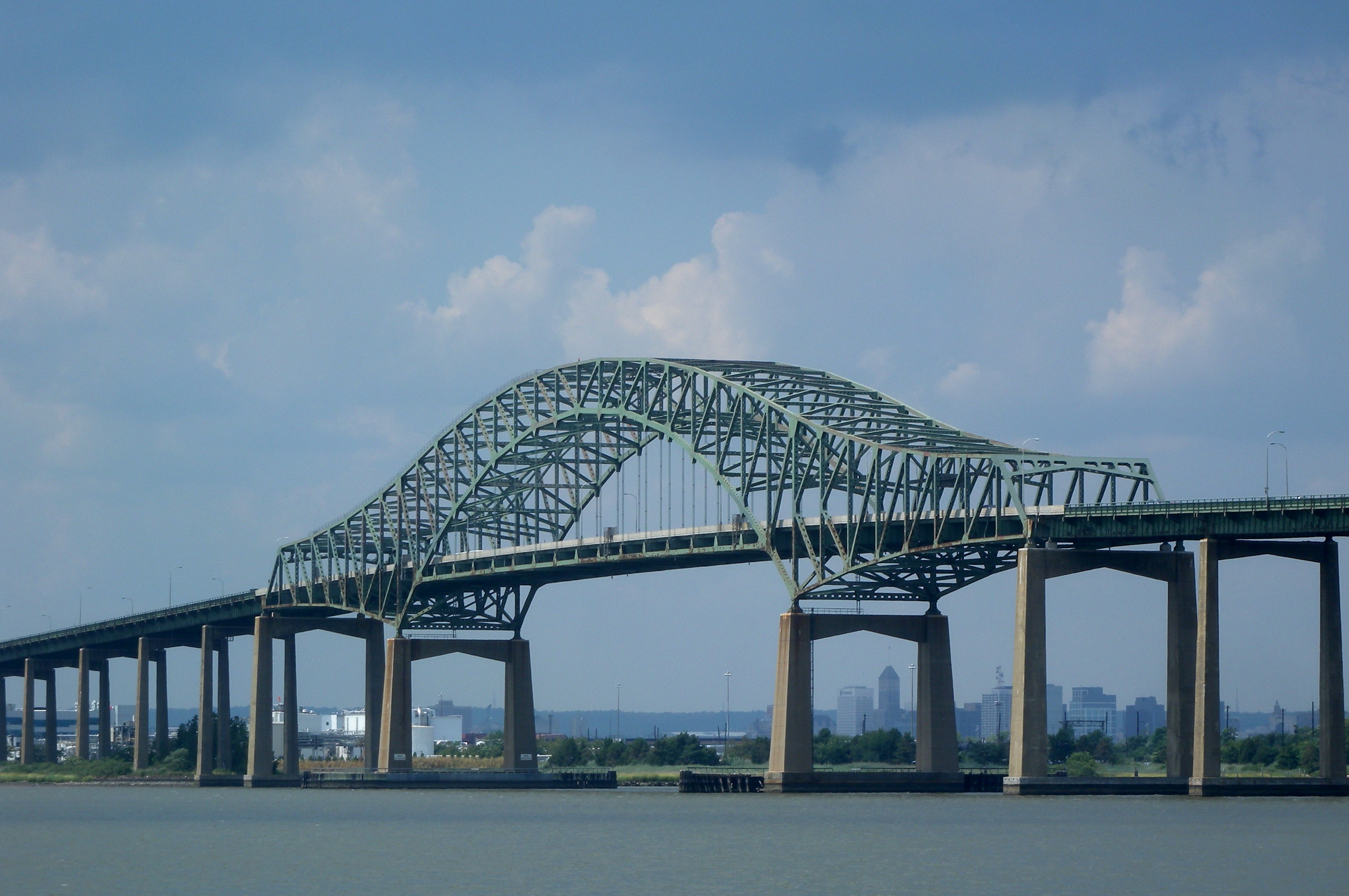
- The Newark Bay Bridge and the Newark skyline as seen from Richard A. Rutkowski Park in Bayonne in 2010
- Coordinates: 40.6953°N 74.1184°W
- Carries: 4 lanes of I-78 Toll / Newark Bay Extension
- Crosses: Newark Bay
- Locale: Newark, New Jersey and Bayonne, New Jersey
- Official name: Vincent R. Casciano Memorial Bridge
- Other name: The Turnpike Bridge
- Maintained by: New Jersey Turnpike Authority

Characteristics
- Design: Three-span continuous through arch bridge
- Total length: 9,560 feet
- Width: 115 feet
- Longest span: 387.10 meters (1,270.0 feet)
- Clearance above: 135 feet
- Clearance below: 135 feet (41 meters)

History
- Opened: April 4, 1956; 70 years ago

Statistics
- Daily traffic: 65,000
- Toll: Varies by distance travelled on NJ Turnpike

Location
- Interactive map of Newark Bay Bridge

The Newark Bay Bridge, officially the Vincent R. Casciano Memorial Bridge, is a steel through arch bridge that is continuous across three spans. It crosses Newark Bay and connects the cities of Newark (in Essex County) and Bayonne (in Hudson County) in New Jersey, United States. It was completed April 4, 1956, as part of the New Jersey Turnpike's Newark Bay (Hudson County) Extension, with a ribbon-cutting ceremony led by Governor of New Jersey Robert B. Meyner.

The main span is 1,270 feet (390 m), with a 135-foot (41 m) clearance over water to allow marine access to Port Newark. The bridge is similar in design to the Delaware River–Turnpike Toll Bridge, and was similar in length to the Francis Scott Key Bridge at Baltimore's Outer Harbor. It runs parallel to the earlier built Lehigh Valley Terminal Railway's Upper Bay Bridge.

This bridge is also known as "The Turnpike Bridge" and "The Turnpike Extension Bridge". It carries traffic on a toll regulated section of Interstate 78 along the New Jersey Turnpike to interchanges 14 through 14A. It provides access from the New Jersey Turnpike's main roadway to Hudson County, New Jersey and the Holland Tunnel. The turnpike route creates the border between Bayonne and Jersey City and then runs northward along Port Jersey, Liberty State Park, and Downtown Jersey City. Hoboken is just north of the entrance to Holland Tunnel which continues to Lower Manhattan in New York City.

From March 2014 until May 2019, during certain hours, the eastbound shoulder of the Turnpike Extension (including the bridge) was opened for normal traffic (by green arrows above, instead of red Xs), for a total of 5 lanes (3 eastbound, 2 westbound). This system was discontinued on May 20, 2019.

=== Cable-stayed bridge replacement ===
There is a long-term capital improvements project to build a new bridge. The plans call for a pair of cable-stayed bridges to replace the existing through-arch bridge, although the design faces opposition from those who want a smaller bridge or no new bridge at all. The United States Coast Guard completed an environmental review of the planned bridge and, in May 2025, issued a Finding Of No Significant Impact. In January 2026, the New Jersey Turnpike Authority approved a memorandum of understanding with Bayonne's government regarding the new bridge. At the time, construction on the first cable-stayed bridge, next to the existing bridge, was planned to begin shortly and take ten years.

Governor Mikie Sherrill endorsed reducing the replacement bridge's capacity to four lanes in early 2026, if this change is approved, only one of the cable-stayed bridges would be built. Work on temporary trestles for the Newark Bay Bridge's replacement began in March 2026. On November 5, 2026, a ground-breaking ceremony took place marking the beginning of construction. The new single-span, cable-stayed bridge will have two travel lanes in each direction with shoulders. The new bridge will be built parallel to and immediately north of the existing steel arch bridge, which will remain open until the new bridge is completed, then dismantled.

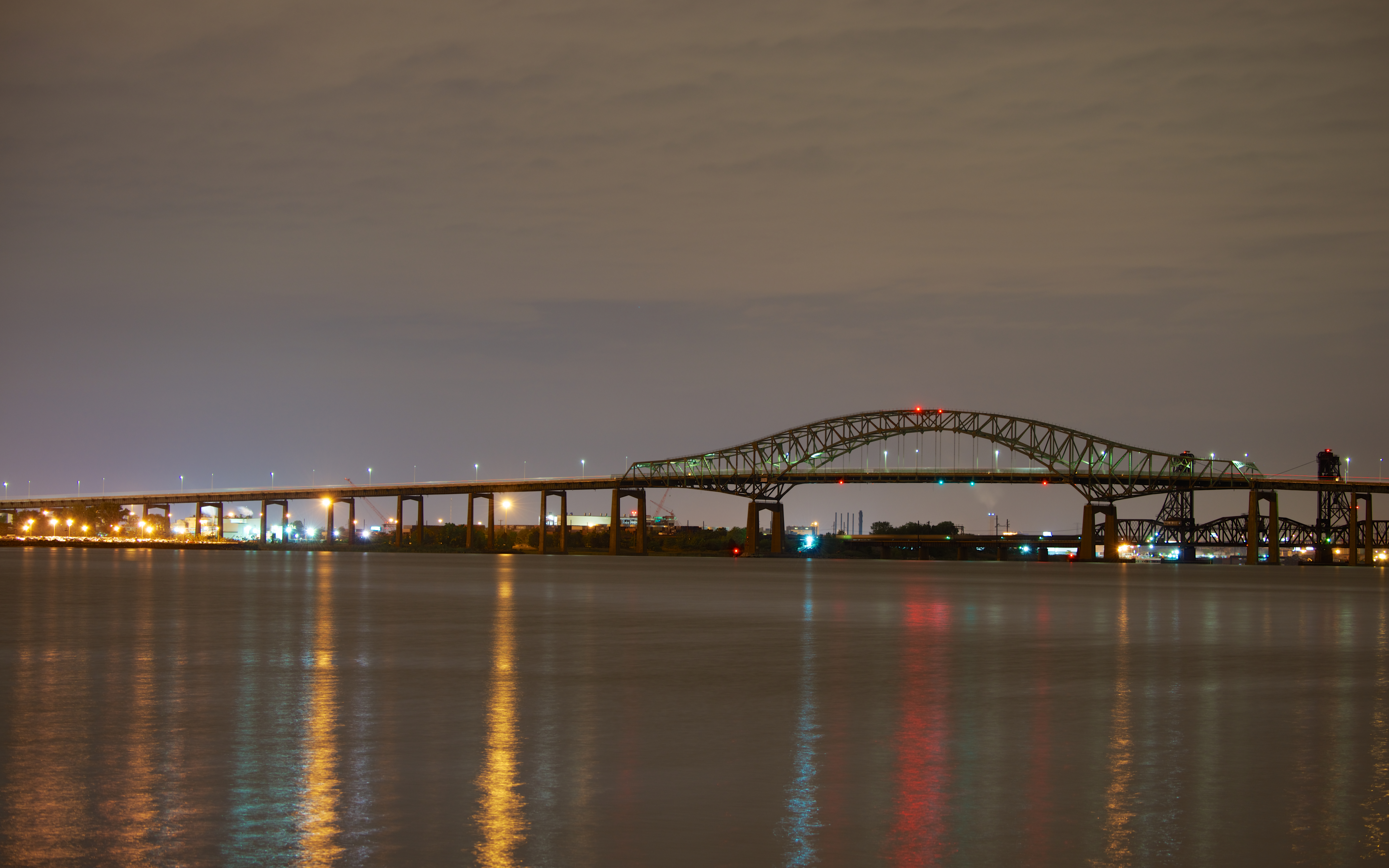
The bridge at night

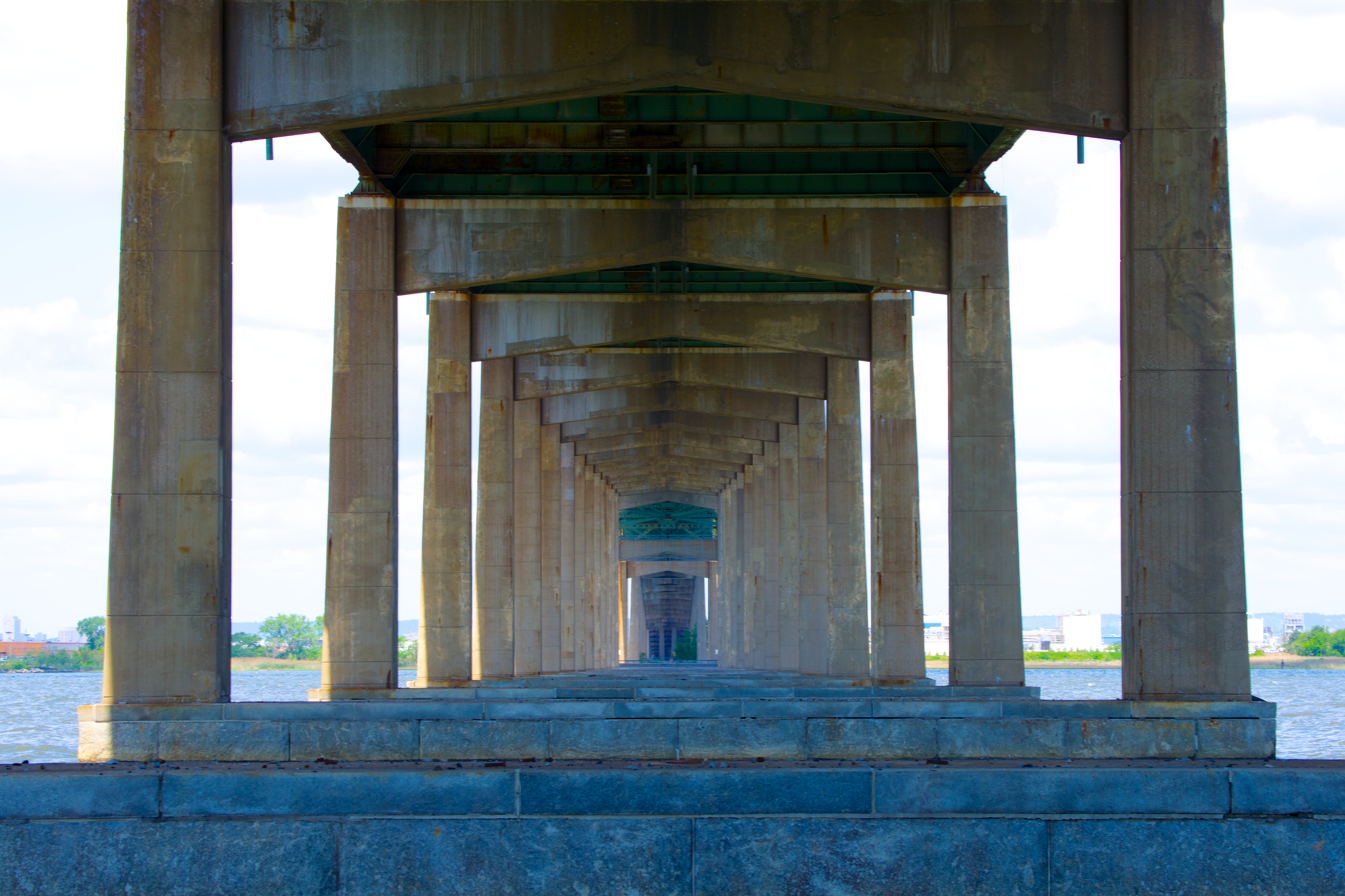
Under the bridge

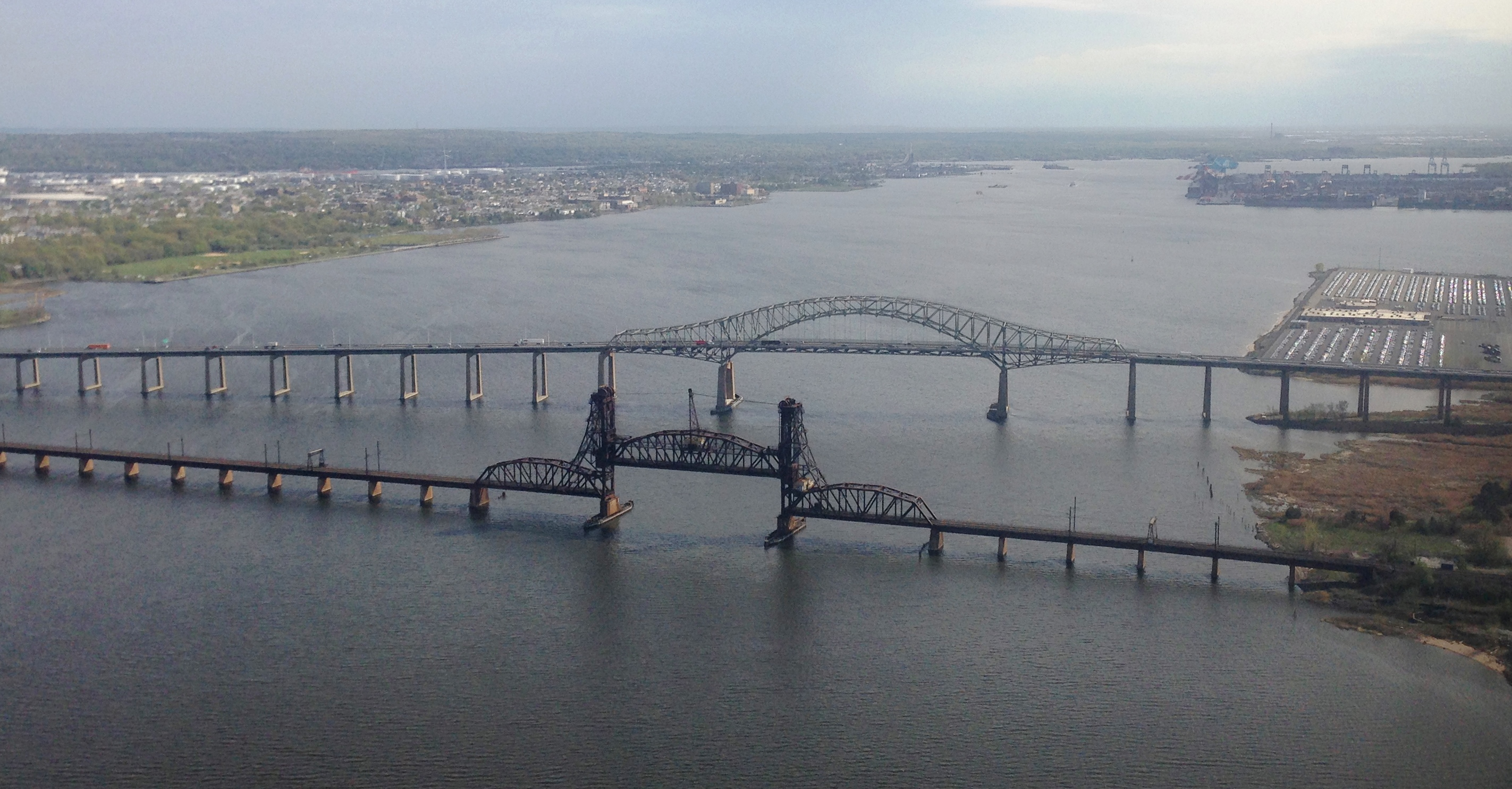
Aerial view with the Upper Bay Bridge in the foreground

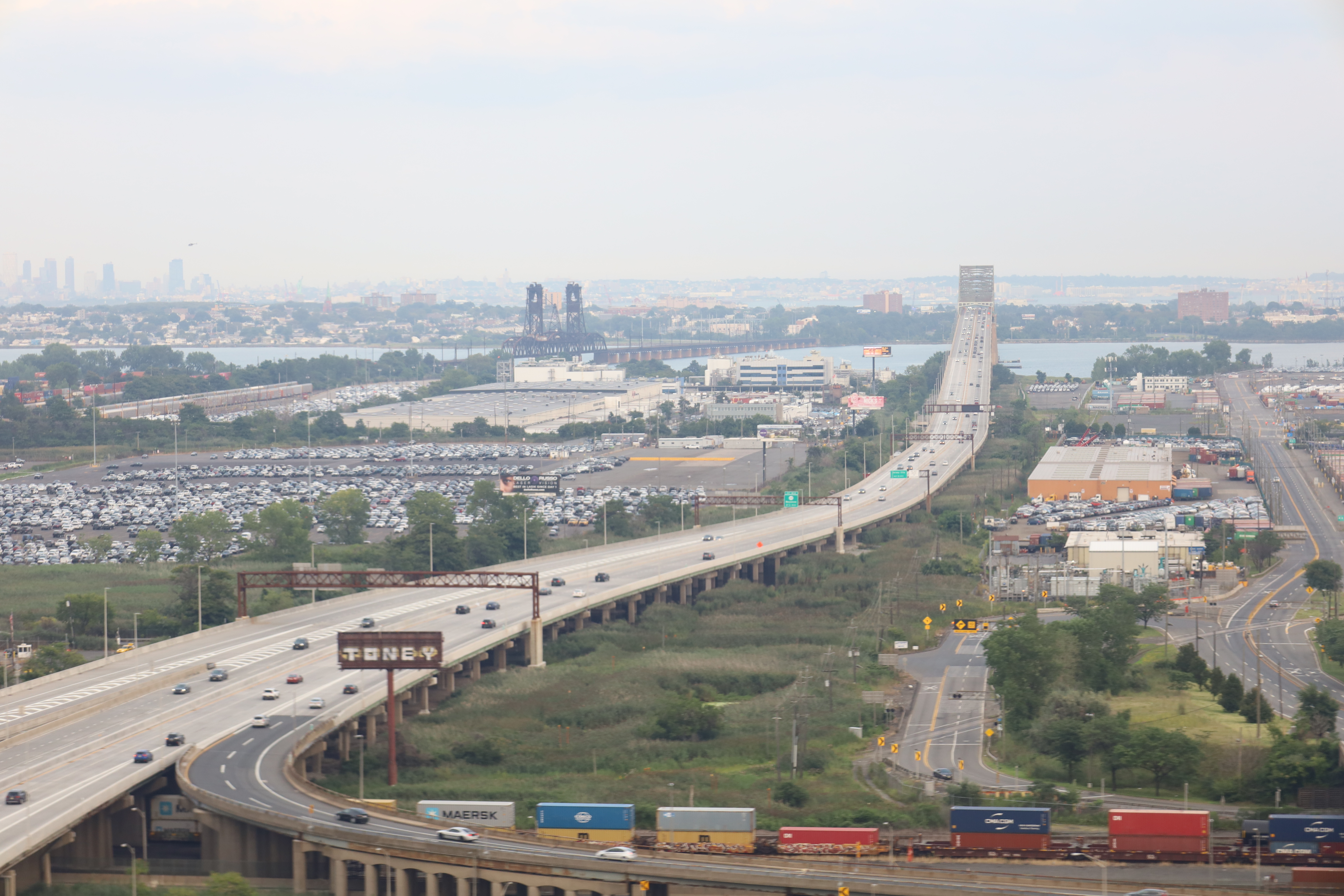
Aerial view of the bridge approach in 2023

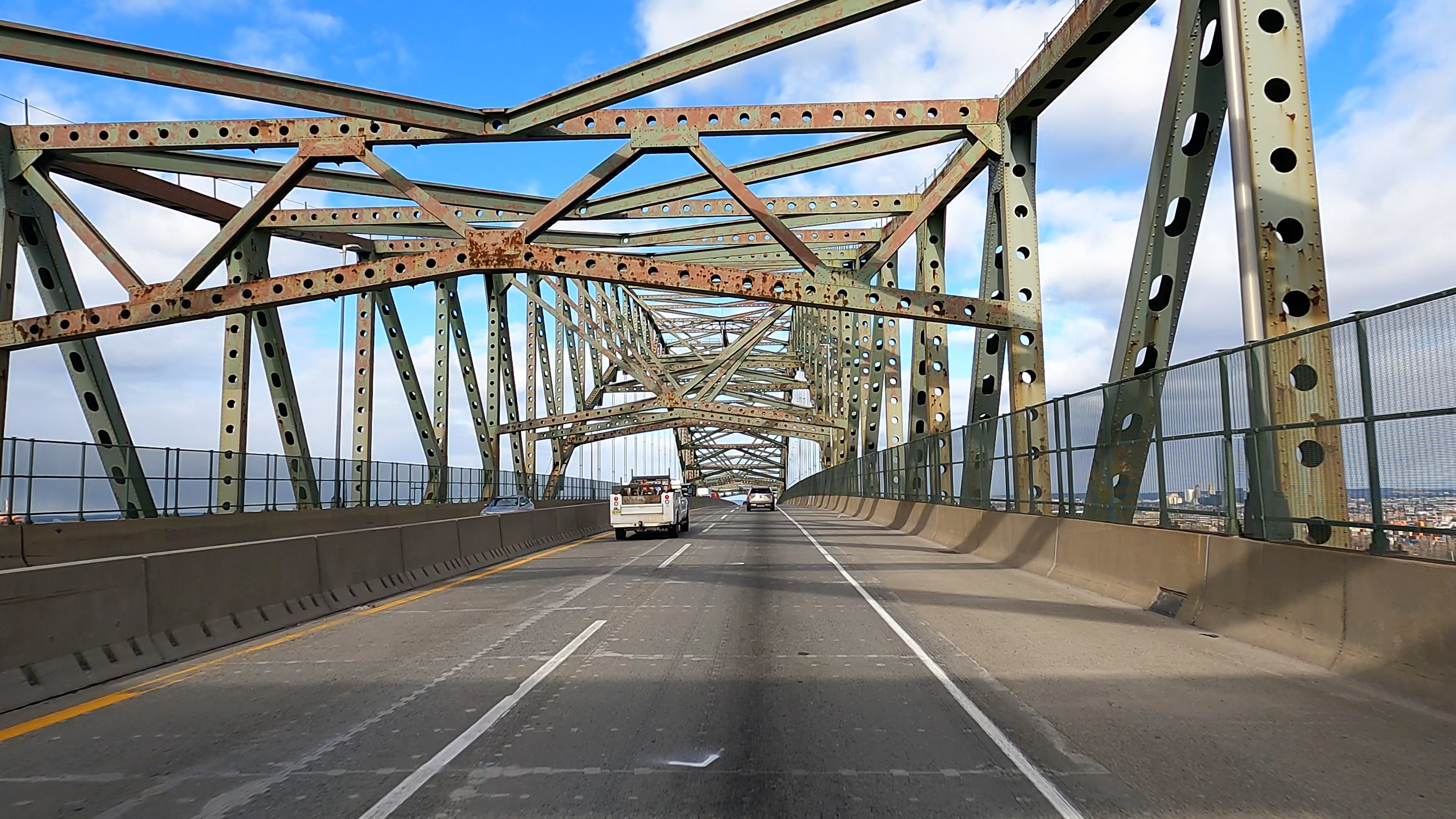
Head west, approaching the main span across the deck

== See also ==
- List of bridges, tunnels, and cuts in Hudson County, New Jersey
- CRRNJ Newark Bay Bridge
