= Phineas Pemberton House =

Historic house in Pennsylvania, United States

- U.S. National Register of Historic Places
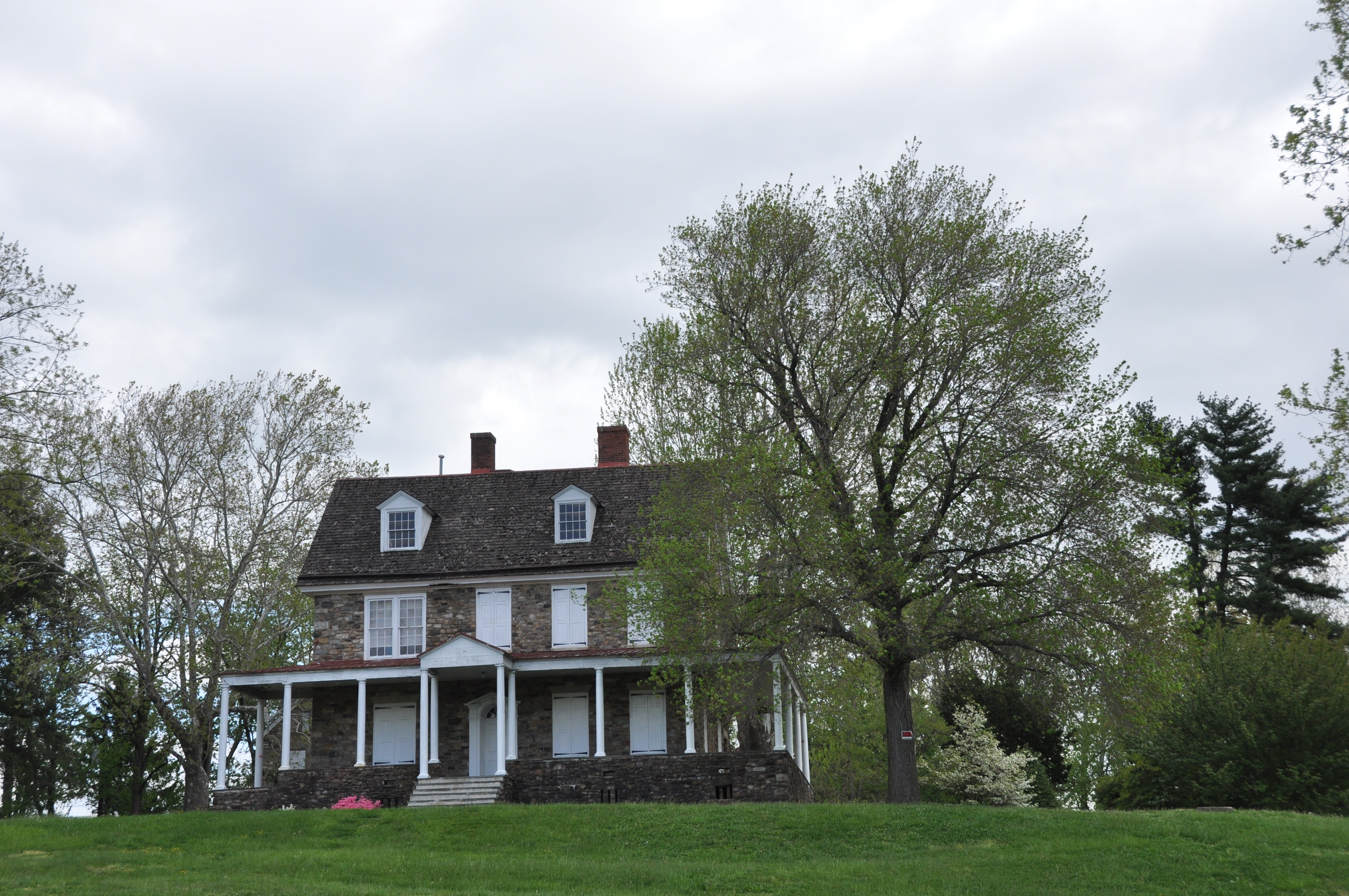
- Phineas Pemberton House, April 2012

- Location within Pennsylvania Location within the United States
- Location: 85 Holly Dr., Levittown, Bristol Township, Bucks County, Pennsylvania
- Coordinates: 40°9′37″N 74°50′23″W
- Area: 5 acres (2.0 ha)
- Built: 1687 (original), 1790 (main)
- Architectural style: Georgian
- NRHP reference No.: 71000684
- Added to NRHP: September 28, 1971

Phineas Pemberton House, also known as the Bolton Mansion, is a historic home located in Levittown, Bristol Township, Bucks County, Pennsylvania. It consists of four connected structures built between 1687 and 1790.

It was added to the National Register of Historic Places in 1971.

== History ==
=== Pemberton family ===
The Pembertons were of English lineage. The direct paternal ancestor, Phineas Pemberton and his family from Lancashire traveled aboard the ship Submission in late 1682 from Liverpool to North America, intending to land in Philadelphia. However, There are various stories of bad storms (or paid bounty) that landed them instead at the mouth of the Choptank River, at the tiny village of Oxford, on the Maryland Eastern shore of the ChesapeakeProvince of Maryland, and eventually settled in Bucks County, Pennsylvania. There, he and his family settled on their first farm, along the Delaware River in Falls Township, on a property he called "Grove Place". After losing most of his family at Grove Place, he sought higher ground, and purchased 303 acres of mixed low and high land, in Bristol Township, where he built his second house, in 1699. That property eventually became known as Bolton, named after his town of origin in England. That property already had a small set of connected stone cottages on it, the earliest one of the two, having been built in 1687, from local green mica schist. Throughout the 20 years Phineas lived in Pennsylvania, he served his community, and William Penn, in many roles. By 1686, he was assigned as the Deputy Director of Records for Bucks County, and was promoted to THE Director of Records by 1687. He was a Member of the Provincial Council, a Member of the Assembly, The Surveyor General of Bucks County, the FIRST Recorder of Deeds for Bucks County, he was Speaker of the Assembly for several years, and was responsible for compiling the "Book of Arrivals" (all new immigrants to PA), and the "Ear-Mark" registry book, and early form of livestock branding. (Copies of both on file at the Spruance Library, Mercer Museum, Doylestown, PA). With so many administrative "hats", it is no surprise he is frequently referred to as William Penn's chief administrator. He was certainly working in enough different capacities to earn that title.

=== Building ===
The original house was built in 1687, and is now part of the rear wing. It is a 2.5-story, Green mica schist structure, one room per floor. The stone was quarried directly on the property about 200 feet from the house. It currently has brick topped chimneys. But the original may have been stone, as all of the interior flues and fire places are the same stone structure as the house. Both of the earliest structures were built as 2.5 story four-bay structures, with the older structure being slightly shorter, hearth-to-stairs. Originally, there were no interior connections between the two connected cottages. Immediately after purchasing this new property, Phineas Pemberton started the construction of his new Manor House, a few steps away from the original cottages. That construction was all English Style Timber Frame, and had a basement kitchen and bake oven. Only the foundation of that house remains, as it was destroyed by the British during the Revolution. It was reconstructed, again as Timber Frame by Phineas' grandson, James Pemberton, around 1803-4, it continued to serve as the formal "Manor House" until an 1876 addition to the "other" house relegated it to "Farmers' Quarters for the hired hands. The Grander front section of the current "Mansion/Manor" house was built in the early 1790's, and is a much larger "Federal/Georgian Style structure, of Timber-frame construction. It has 12 foot ceilings on both first and second floors, and a 9 foot ceiling on the third floor. But its construction got "terminated" before the whole house could be completed, so it only consists of the grand hallway, and two rooms on one side (all three floors). In 1876, one of the Pemberton descendants "completed" the footprint with a Balloon-frame Victorian addition. Both of these new additions were built a short distance from the original 17th-century stone cottages (about 18 feet). The last family heir connected the 17th century structures to the 1790-1876 construction in the late 19th century, and in 1914, he encased all of the timber/balloon construction with stone purchased from the collapsing out-buildings at the Morrisville historic estate, "Summerseat" The effect is to give the pleasant illusion that the house was always constructed of stone. It has a gambrel roof, which is a continuation of the original 1790 roof line. At one point, during the 1876-1914 period, there was even a "Widdows' Watch" railing surrounding the top portion of this roof. And there is still the roof hatch out to that section of the roof. The original Phineas Pemberton Manor house, rebuilt by James, converted to Farmers' Quarters, burned in a house fire in early 1900. It, too, was totally reconstructed in stone on the original foundation. But they didn't dismantle the interior fireplaces during that reconstruction, so it was rebuilt to the same scale as the original, with 9.5 foot ceilings both floors, to match the fireplace hearth elevations. . The house is owned and maintained by the Friends of Bolton Mansion. It is open as a historic house museum.

This important historic site has direct connections to William Penn, the Revolutionary War, The Abolitionist Movement, the War of 1812, the purchase of Florida from Spain, The United States Supreme Court, both Pittsburg Steel, and US Steel, The Wistar Institute, The University of Pennsylvania's first Field School of Veterinary Medicine and Science, The Bristol Arsenal, The Emili Perseverance Corporation for the Prevention and Apprehension of Horse Thieves and Other Scoundrels, and Bristol Township Headquarters. It was the Sales and Engineering Headquarters for the construction of Levittown. In recognition of its historical significance, the house was added to the National Register of Historic Places in 1971.
