= Pennsylvania Turnpike/Interstate 95 Interchange Project =

Highway construction project

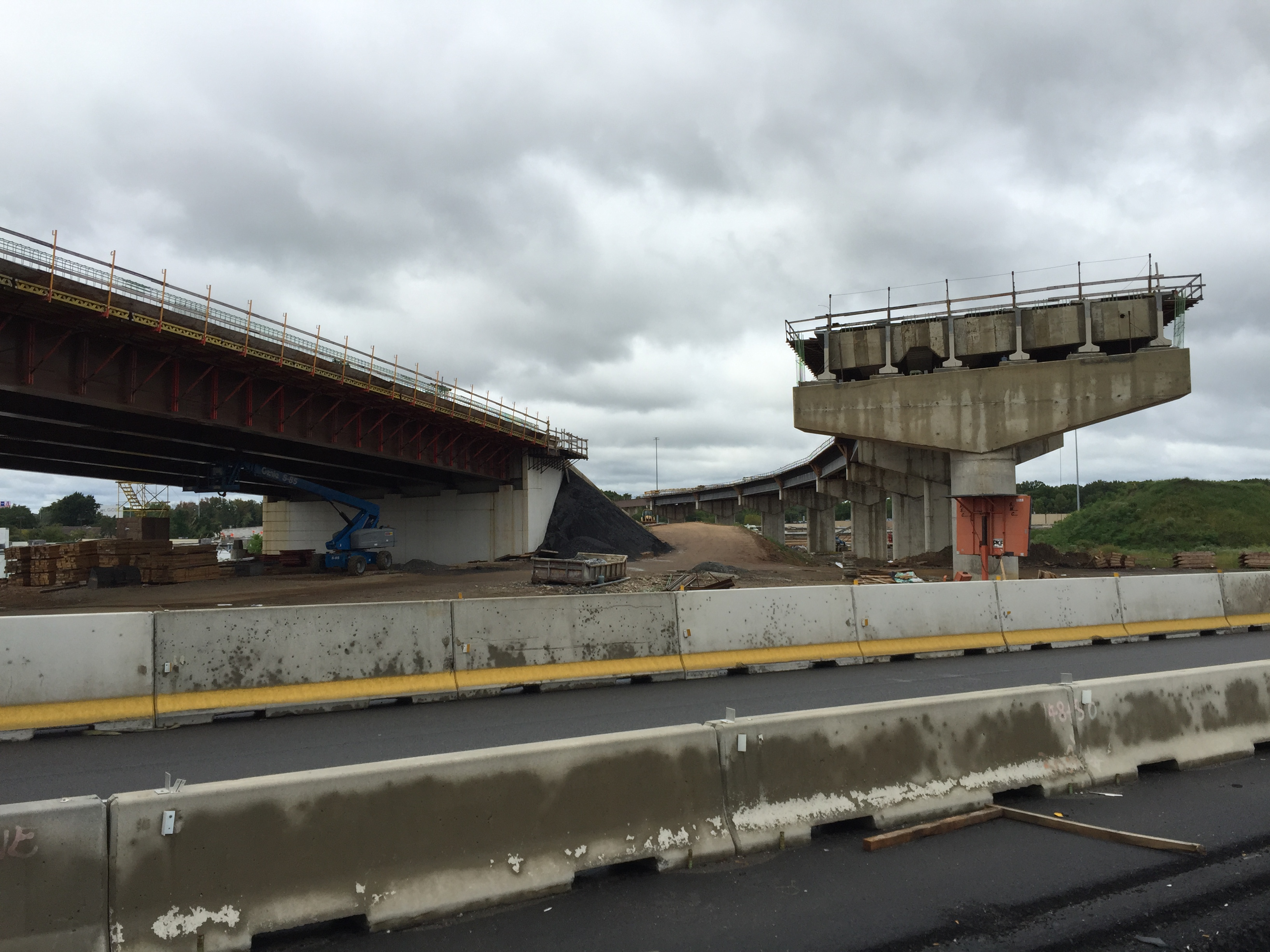
- Ramps for Interstate 95 under construction in 2017
- Interactive map of Pennsylvania Turnpike/Interstate 95 Interchange Project

Location
- Bristol Township, Bucks County, Pennsylvania
- Coordinates: 40.127292°N 74.886546°W
- Roads at junction: I-95; I-276 Toll / Penna Turnpike; I-295

Construction
- Type: Interchange
- Constructed: Stage 1: 2010–present; Stages 2 & 3: planned; by: Design: A. D. Marble & Company, Jacobs Engineering Group, HNTB; Management: Portfolio Associates, Urban Engineers; Inspection: AECOM, WSP, L.R. Kimball, Temple Group Incorporated
- Opened: September 22, 2018 (mainline movements of I-95)
- Maintained by: Pennsylvania Turnpike Commission

The Pennsylvania Turnpike/Interstate 95 Interchange Project is an ongoing road construction project to build an interchange between Interstate 95 (I-95) and the Pennsylvania Turnpike in Bristol Township, Bucks County, Pennsylvania, in the United States. The $553 million first stage is complete: a pair of flyover ramps—one connecting I-95 northbound with the eastbound turnpike and the other connecting the westbound turnpike with I-95 southbound—opened in 2018, with some cleanups to connecting roads completed in 2021. Construction of the remaining ramps is expected to begin when funding is available.

The project filled a gap in I-95 left by the cancellation of the Somerset Freeway in New Jersey in the 1980s. It completes the highway from Miami to the Houlton–Woodstock Border Crossing in Maine, and makes it a continuous route between Philadelphia and New York City. After the first two ramps opened, I-95 was redirected eastward along the Pennsylvania Turnpike to the New Jersey Turnpike. I-295 was extended from its former northern terminus at U.S. Route 1 (US 1) in Lawrence Township, New Jersey, west and south across the Scudder Falls Bridge along the former section of I-95 to the Pennsylvania Turnpike.

The project also includes plans to rebuild nearby interchanges and overpasses and widen the turnpike from US 1 in Bensalem Township eastward to the Delaware River; some of these components have been completed, while the others are contingent on funding. The interchange project initially had approval and funding to double the capacity of the nearby Delaware River–Turnpike Toll Bridge between Bristol Township and Burlington Township, New Jersey, by building an identical second span. But after cracks were discovered in the bridge, officials decided to replace it with a new structure that as of early 2023, has not yet been designed.

The Pennsylvania Turnpike/Interstate 95 Interchange Project is the last project to be financed under the Federal Aid Highway Act of 1956, which established the Interstate Highway System. It is also the first transportation project in Pennsylvania to be funded through the EB-5 visa program; its success may lead the Pennsylvania Turnpike Commission to apply the program to the unfinished Mon–Fayette Expressway and Southern Beltway projects near Pittsburgh.

== History ==
At the formation of the Interstate Highway System, I-95 was planned as a Florida-to-Maine superhighway passing through the Northeast Megalopolis. However, decades of disputes among local and regional governments and private landowners prevented or delayed the design and construction of this highway from the Trenton–Philadelphia area to northern New Jersey in the New Brunswick–Piscataway area. Until 2018, I-95 was incomplete because of the gap in this area. If drivers wished to proceed northbound from Newark, Delaware, to New York City without encountering a traffic signal, the most direct route was (and still is today) to exit I-95 onto I-295 just south of Wilmington, enter New Jersey via the Delaware Memorial Bridge, and continue north on the New Jersey Turnpike. Alternatively, drivers who stayed on I-95 northbound passed through Delaware County, Pennsylvania, the city of Philadelphia, and Bucks County, Pennsylvania, and then over the Delaware River on the Scudder Falls Bridge into Mercer County, New Jersey, northwest of Trenton on what is now I-295. Before 2018, from this point, I-95 abruptly ended at the interchange with US 1 in Lawrence Township and became I-295 southbound. Motorists then entered I-195 eastbound from I-295 exit 60A, and then took I-195 to the New Jersey Turnpike northbound (where I-95 continues). According to the New Jersey Turnpike Authority, the turnpike was signed as I-95 north of exit 7A (for I-195) in the area of Robbinsville Township. However, the New Jersey Department of Transportation (NJDOT) stated that I-95 started from the Delaware River–Turnpike Toll Bridge and followed the New Jersey Turnpike Extension to the northbound lanes of the mainline of the turnpike.

=== Early proposed Interstate 95 routings ===
During the mid-1950s, while I-95 was still in its infancy, a proposal was made to route it through the city of Trenton by way of the Trenton–Morrisville Toll Bridge (now in use and designated as US 1). New Jersey opposed this routing due to the limited capacity of the bridge. A proposal to bypass and loop around Trenton was formally proposed and agreed upon by both states in the late 1950s. What was eventually called the Scudder Falls Bridge was constructed in 1959. Completed soon afterward was a section of I-95 north of Trenton. Plans then began in the mid-1960s to join this segment to I-287 in northern New Jersey. This controversial section of I-95 became known as the Somerset Freeway, but by 1978, doubts were expressed if I-95 would ever be completed.

=== Somerset Freeway ===
The Somerset Freeway was to run from existing I-95 (present-day I-295) in Hopewell Township northeast to I-287 in Piscataway Township, where I-95 would have followed I-287 east to the New Jersey Turnpike. The project was cancelled in 1982, primarily for two reasons. First, residents along the Princeton corridor feared increased congestion and a drop in property values. Second, the state of New Jersey feared a drop in state revenues by diverting traffic from the New Jersey Turnpike. A 1980 article in The New York Times stated:

Killing I-95 means that the entire length of the turnpike almost surely will become the official I-95 artery through the state, thus assuring it a continued source of toll revenue. At present, only that segment of the turnpike north of exit 10 in Middlesex County is designated as I-95.

This did not come fully to pass, as the Commonwealth of Pennsylvania objected to having Interstate 95 removed from within its boundaries. Instead, I-95 was rerouted south on the New Jersey Turnpike to exit 6, and onto its Pennsylvania Extension to end at the state line, pending the construction of an interchange where the Pennsylvania Turnpike crossed existing I-95 in Pennsylvania. This route was legislated in the Surface Transportation Assistance Act of 1982. I-95 was originally built without an interchange with the Pennsylvania Turnpike because federal laws at the time, since repealed, prohibited federal funds from being used to build interchanges with toll roads.

=== Finalization of plans ===
Although this project was legislated in 1982, an impact study was not started by the Pennsylvania Turnpike Commission until 1992, which was not completed until 2003. Details were hashed out during the design sessions that took place from 2004 to 2006. One of the last uncertainties was the question of what would become of the existing section of I-95 north of the interchange. The Design Advisory Committee determined that in order to avoid confusion, that segment would become an extension of I-195 when the interchange is completed, and the part of I-276 east of the interchange would become part of I-95. On May 20, 2015, it was decided to extend I-295 instead of I-195 along the former section of I-95 into Pennsylvania south to the new interchange.

Financing on the project was partially provided to the heavily indebted Pennsylvania Turnpike Commission by a group of foreign investors who invested $200 million through a transaction put together by the Delaware Valley Regional Center (DVRC). The turnpike commission will pay a 2% annual interest rate, saving $35 million over the period of the loan. The DVRC managing director, Joseph P. Manheim, said the regional center will receive commissions and fees. The remainder of the funding of the project will come from U.S. government turnpike funds.

== Design and construction ==
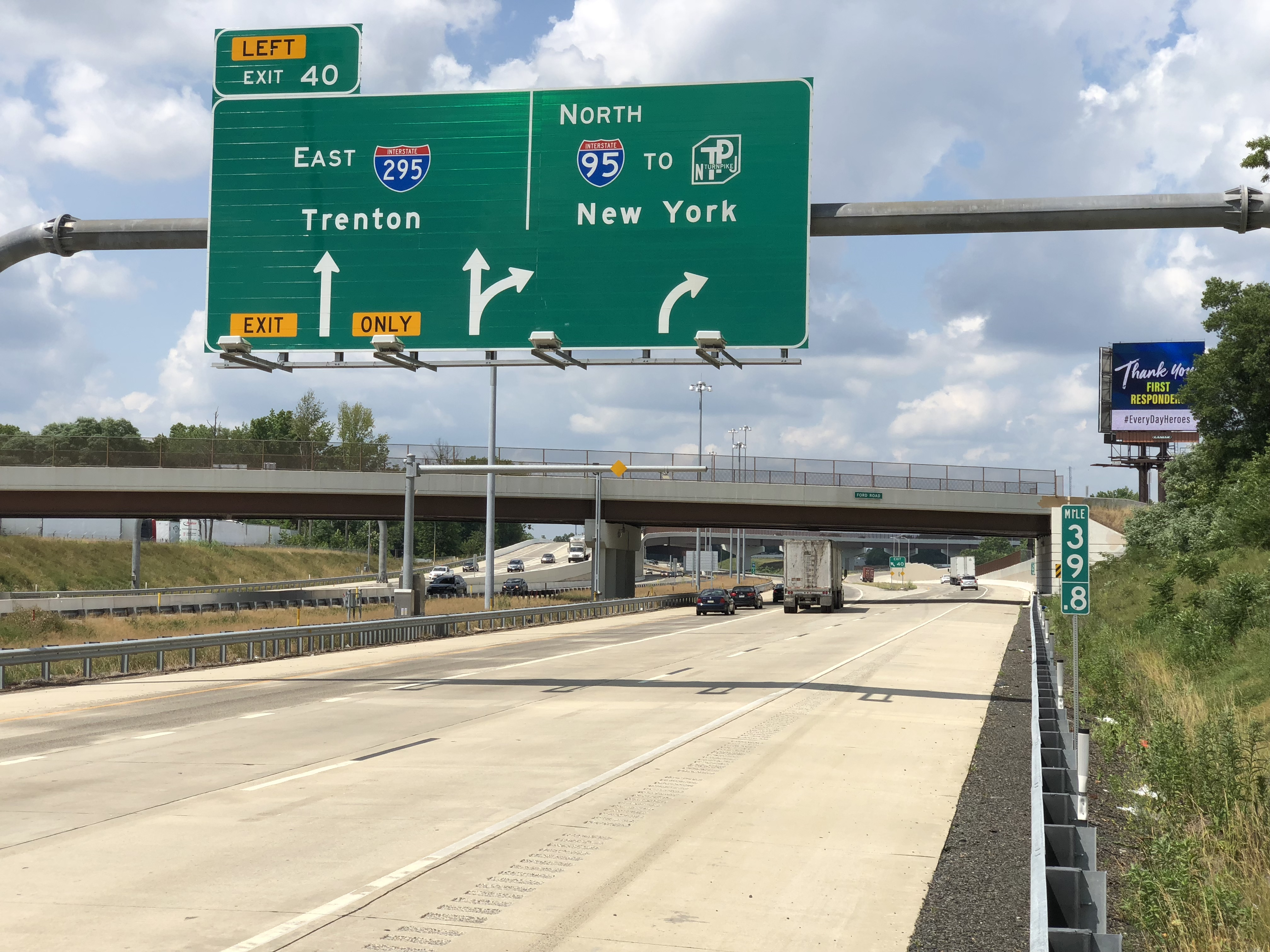
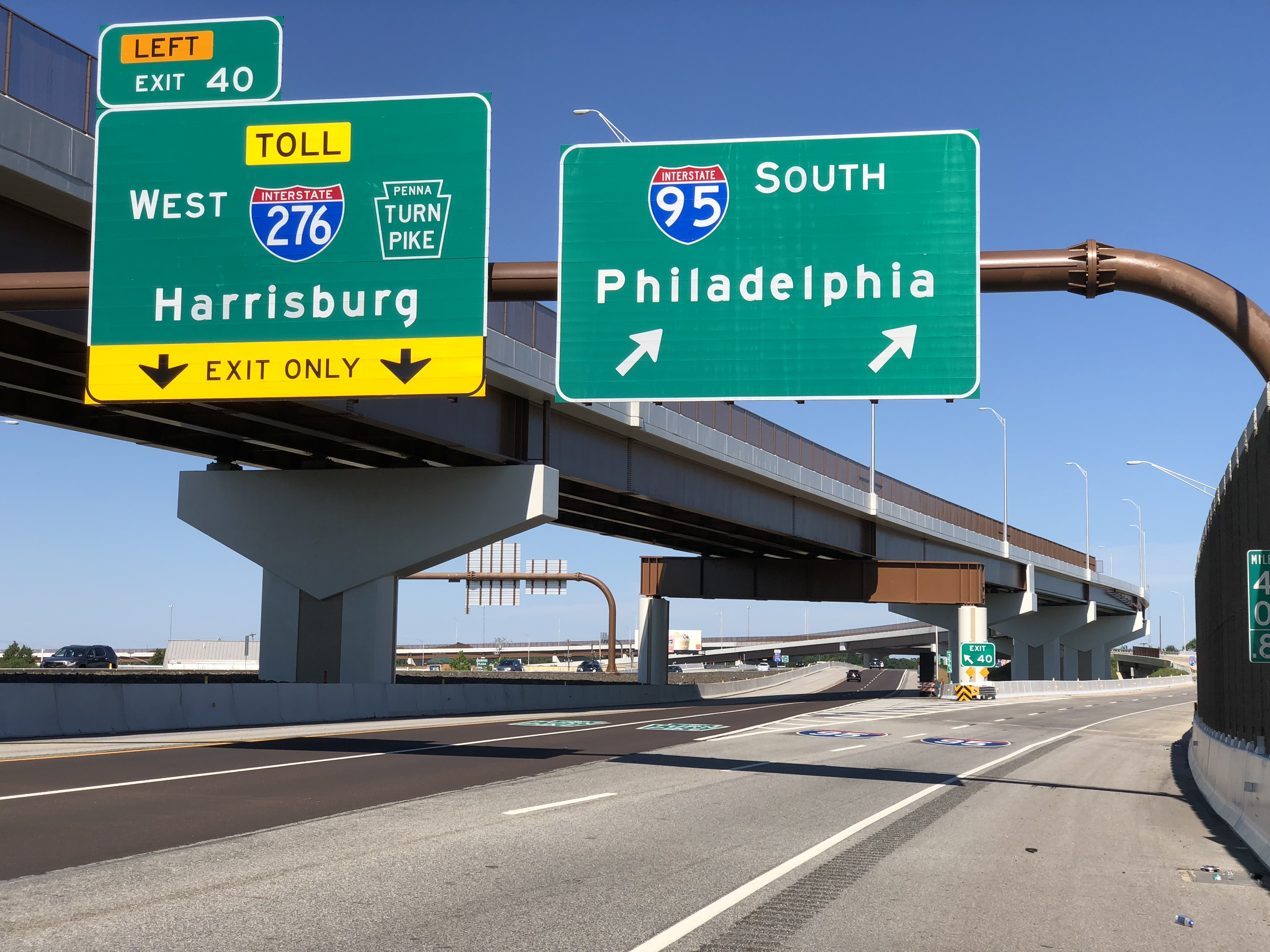
Signage at the first components of the interchange from both directions of I-95

The multi-phased construction began in late 2010, and the approved design called for Stage 1 to tentatively end in 2020. Groundbreaking for the interchange took place on July 30, 2013, with Governor Tom Corbett in attendance. Construction of the first stage of the interchange, supplying the mainline movements of I-95, began in late 2014. In order to accommodate the projected high traffic volume, a new toll plaza, completed in January 2016, was constructed about two miles (3.2 km) west of the interchange, terminating the ticket system on the Pennsylvania Turnpike. The former toll plaza at the Delaware River bridge was converted to an electronic toll gantry which collects a flat-rate toll for west/southbound traffic only. In March 2018, I-95 was renumbered to I-295 between US 1 in Lawrence Township, New Jersey and Taylorsville Road in Lower Makefield Township, Pennsylvania. In July 2018, I-295 was extended southward to the future Pennsylvania Turnpike interchange, switching cardinal directions at Taylorsville Road, with northbound becoming westbound, even though the road actually goes south from that point. The two flyover ramps that officially bridge the I-95 gap opened on September 22, 2018, before the completion of Stage 1. This stage also called for the widening of the turnpike between exits 351 (US 1) and 42 (US 13) from four lanes to six, and reconstruction of the turnpike's interchange with US 13.

Stage 2 of the project involves the construction of ramps supplying the remaining six movements between I-276, I-95, and I-295, the replacement of three overpasses along the turnpike, reconstruction of the Bensalem Interchange with US 1, and further widening of the turnpike. This stage will begin when funding is available.

The third and final stage was supposed to consist of the construction of a second eastbound/northbound span of the Delaware River–Turnpike Toll Bridge across the Delaware River, adjacent to the current one, which would have allowed each direction of traffic to utilize separate bridge spans. However, in 2017, a fracture was discovered in the existing structure, causing the Commission and Authority to change their plans for the project. Currently, PTC and NJTA plan to replace the bridge in its entirety. Construction is expected to begin no earlier than 2025.

The first stage of the project, which includes the new toll plaza, widening, and the flyover ramps between I-95 and the turnpike, is projected to cost about $553 million. The flyover ramps are expected to cost $142.9 million, with $100 million coming from federal funds and the remainder from the turnpike commission. The Pennsylvania Turnpike Commission is borrowing money from foreign investors in order to provide funding for the project. The remaining stages of the project are unfunded, with a projected total cost of $1.1 billion for the entire project.

The I-95 project, funded by an amalgam of federal and state entities, created over 5,000 jobs.

== Cashless tolling ==
While the eastern terminus of the toll ticket system on the Pennsylvania Turnpike was moved from the Delaware River Bridge to a spot two miles (3.2 km) west of the interchange, the previous tollbooth at the bridge was replaced by a new cashless toll system—a first for Pennsylvania. This toll system was instituted on January 3, 2016, for west/southbound drivers only. The toll can be paid with E-ZPass or toll-by-plate. As vehicles without an E-ZPass transponder pass through the toll gantry, a camera takes a picture of the vehicle's license plate and the owner of the vehicle is mailed an invoice for the toll. In March 2020, cashless tolling was expanded to the entire Pennsylvania Turnpike system.

== Changes in route designation ==
Signage was changed for affected highways throughout 2018.

Highway section	Former designation	Current designation
Highway from the PA Turnpike in Bristol Township to US 1 in Lawrence Township	I-95	I-295
PA Turnpike from the new interchange in Bristol Township to the Delaware River Turnpike Bridge	I-276	I-95
NJ Turnpike Pennsylvania Extension (Pearl Harbor Memorial Turnpike Extension) from the Delaware River Turnpike Bridge to the mainline NJ Turnpike	I-276 (signage); I-95 (designation)	I-95 (signed)
Mainline NJ Turnpike from the NJ Turnpike Pennsylvania Extension (Pearl Harbor Memorial Turnpike Extension) in Mansfield Township to I-195 in Robbinsville Township	I-95 (unsigned)	I-95 (signed)

== See also ==
- List of gaps in Interstate Highways
