= David Blay Jr. =

American football player (born 2003)

Profile
- Position: Defensive tackle

Personal information
- Born: January 27, 2003 (age 23)
- Listed height: 6 ft 2 in (1.88 m)
- Listed weight: 292 lb (132 kg)

Career information
- High school: Harry S Truman
- College: West Chester (2021–2022); Louisiana Tech (2023–2024); Miami (FL) (2025)
- NFL draft: 2026: undrafted

Career history
- New England Patriots (2026)*; Philadelphia Eagles (2026)*; Green Bay Packers (2026)*
- * Offseason or practice squad member only

Awards and highlights
- First team All-CUSA (2024)
- Stats at Pro Football Reference

David Blay Jr. (born January 28, 2003) is an American professional football defensive tackle. He played college football for the Louisiana Tech Bulldogs, Miami Hurricanes, and West Chester Golden Rams.

== Early life ==
Blay Jr. attended Harry S Truman High School in Levittown, Pennsylvania, and committed to play college football for the West Chester Golden Rams.

== College career ==
=== West Chester ===
In two seasons at West Chester from 2021 and 2022, Blay Jr. redshirted, while recording 39 tackles with 13 being for a loss, and five sacks. After the 2022 season, he entered the NCAA transfer portal.

=== Louisiana Tech ===
Blay Jr. committed to play for the Louisiana Tech Bulldogs. In 2023, he made 16 tackles in ten games played. Blay Jr. had a breakout season in 2024, notching 46 tackles with 10.5 going for a loss, and six and a half sacks. After the 2024 season, he once again entered the NCAA transfer portal.

=== Miami ===
Blay Jr. transferred to play for the Miami Hurricanes. In 2025, he notched 28 tackles as he helped the Hurricanes reach the National Tittle Game.

== Professional career ==
Pre-draft measurables
Height	Weight	Arm length	Hand span	Wingspan	40-yard dash	10-yard split	20-yard split	20-yard shuttle	Three-cone drill	Broad jump	Bench press
6 ft 2 3/8 in (1.89 m)	292 lb (132 kg)	32 in (0.81 m)	10 1/4 in (0.26 m)	6 ft 6 in (1.98 m)	5.08 s	1.74 s	2.97 s	4.81 s	7.69 s	8 ft 2 in (2.49 m)	27 reps
All values from Pro Day

=== New England Patriots ===
After not being selected in the 2026 NFL draft, Blay Jr. signed with the New England Patriots as an undrafted free agent. He was released by the Patriots on August 7.

=== Philadelphia Eagles ===
On August 11, 2026, Blay Jr. signed with the Philadelphia Eagles. He was waived by the Eagles as a part of final roster cuts on August 30.

=== Green Bay Packers ===
On September 30, 2026, Blay Jr. was signed to the Green Bay Packers' practice squad. On November 16, he was released.
