= Bristol Township School District =

School district in Pennsylvania, United States

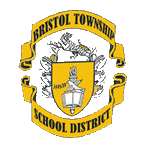

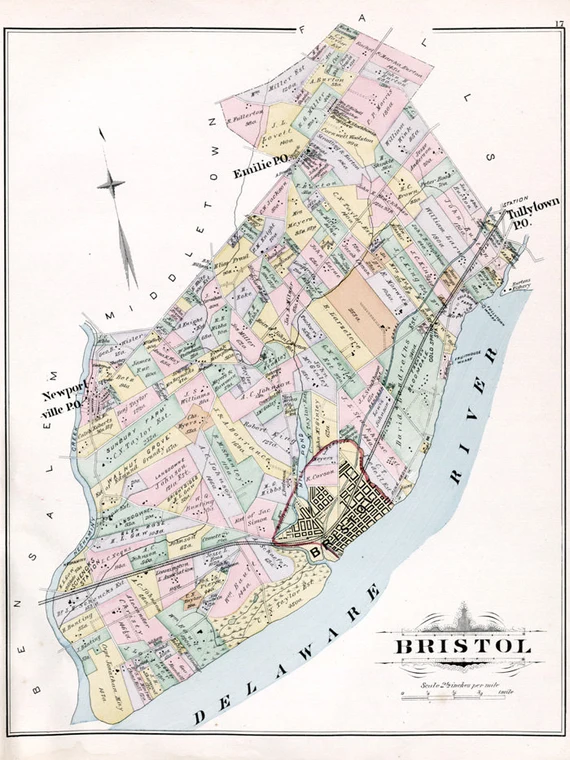

Address
- 5 Blue Lake Rd Levittown, Pennsylvania, 19057; United States
- Coordinates: 40.136°N 74.864°W

District information
- Type: Public
- Grades: PK-12
- President: James P. Morgan III
- Superintendent: Michael Nitti
- Schools: 6
- Budget: US$148.7 million

Students and staff
- Students: 5,971 (2021–22)
- Teachers: 392.00 (FTE) (2021–22)
- Student–teacher ratio: 15.23 (2021–22)
- District mascot: Tigers
- Colors: Black and gold

Other information
- Website: bristoltwpsd.org

Bristol Township School District is a public school district located in Levittown, Pennsylvania (U.S.). It covers Bristol Township in Bucks County. It has 5,971 students in grades PK, K-12 with a student-teacher ratio of 15.23 to 1. The district operates six schools (three elementary schools, two middle schools, one high school) covering grades from pre-kindergarten to 12th grade.

== Schools ==
Elementary schools

- Brookwood Elementary School, Levittown (914 students, 2021–22)
- Keystone Elementary School, Croydon (899 students, 2021–22)
- Mill Creek Elementary School, Levittown (1,015 students, 2021–22)

Middle schools

- Neil A. Armstrong Middle School, Fairless Hills (757 students, 2021–22)
- Benjamin Franklin Middle School, Levittown (720 students, 2021–22)

High schools

- Harry S. Truman High School, Levittown (1,666 students, 2021–22)

== Administration ==
Bristol Township School District is governed under Pennsylvania law by a school board. The board is responsible for providing and maintaining a system of public education for residents within the district boundaries. The board hires a superintendent who is responsible for the day-to-day operation of the school system.

The superintendent is Michael Nitti.

Previous superintendents

- Ellen Budman (–2010)
- Sam Lee (2010–2015)
- Melanie Gehrens (2016–2022)
