= Bristol Township, Pennsylvania =

Township in Pennsylvania, US

Bristol Township
- Township
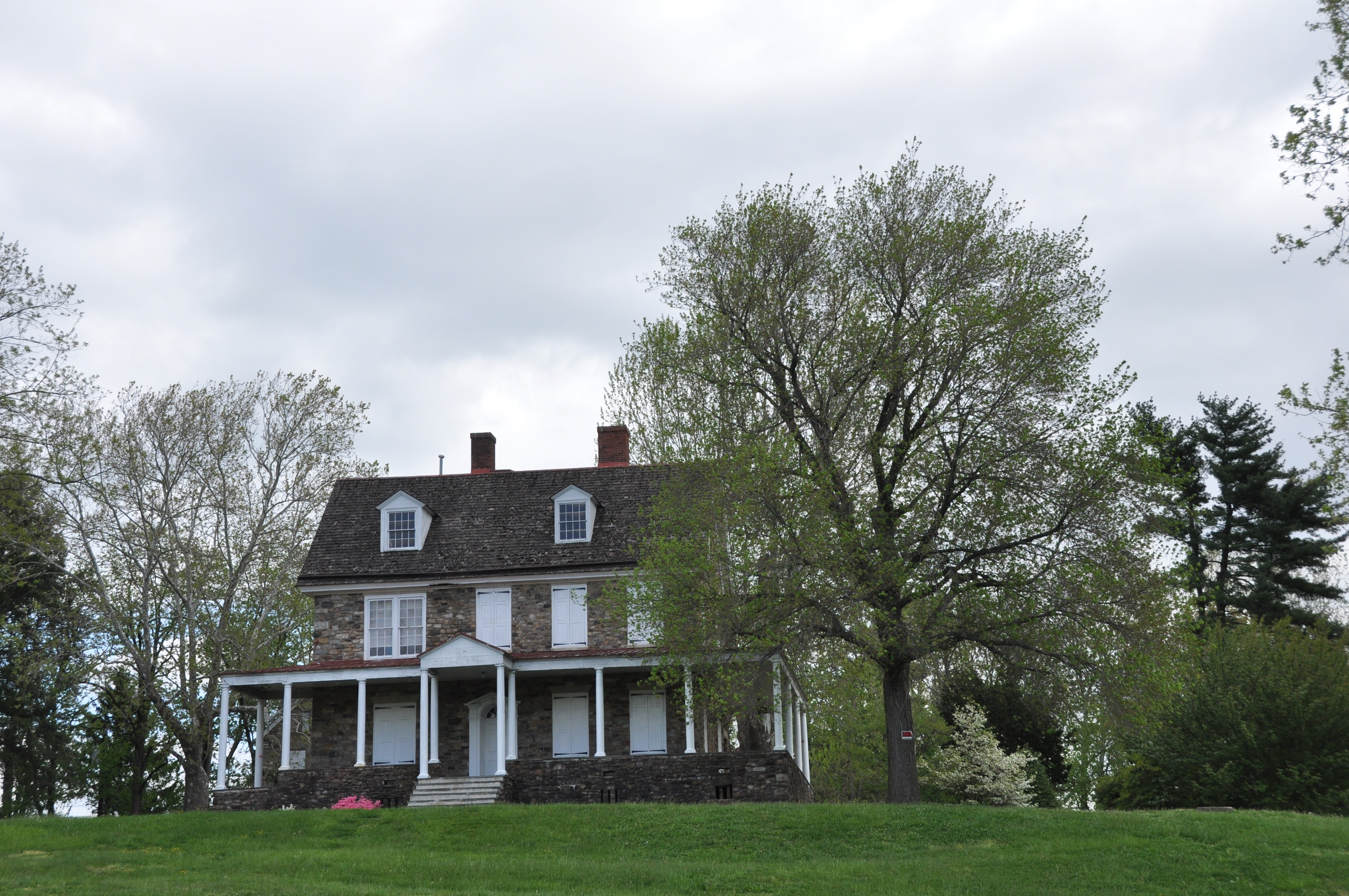
- Phineas Pemberton House, built starting 1687

- Flag Coat of arms Logo

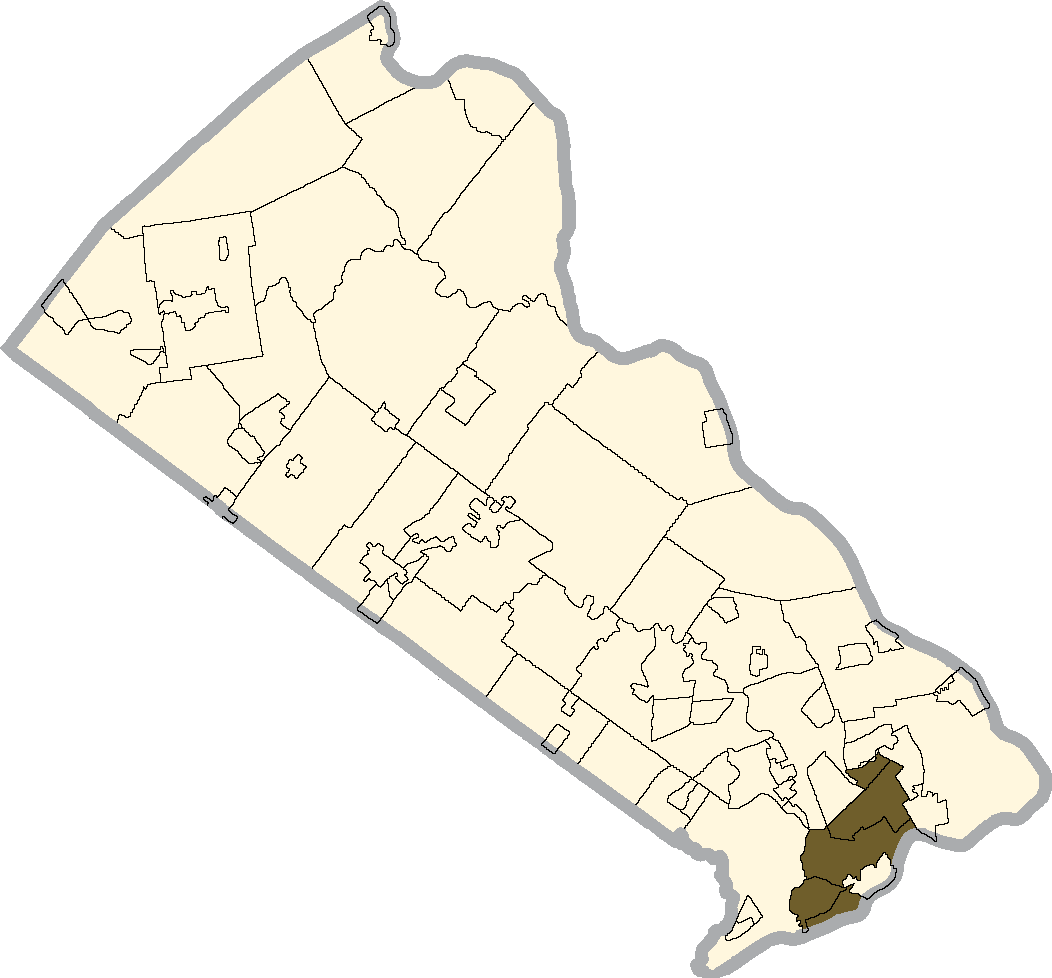
- Location of Bristol Township in Bucks County

- Location in Pennsylvania and the United States Bristol Township (the United States)
- Coordinates: 40°07′00″N 74°51′59″W
- Country: United States
- State: Pennsylvania
- County: Bucks
- Formed: 1692

Area
  - Total: 17.11 sq mi (44.3 km^{2})
  - Land: 15.84 sq mi (41.0 km^{2})
  - Water: 1.27 sq mi (3.3 km^{2})
- Elevation: 16 ft (4.9 m)

Population (2020)
  - Total: 54,291
  - Density: 3,427/sq mi (1,323/km^{2})
- Time zone: UTC-5 (EST)
  - Summer (DST): UTC-4 (EDT)
- Area codes: 215, 267, and 445
- FIPS code: 42-017-08768
- Website: https://www.bristoltwppa.gov/

Bristol Township is a township in Bucks County, Pennsylvania, United States. The population was 54,291 at the 2020 census, making it the 13th largest municipality in the state. Bristol Township, along with Bristol Borough, is a cultural hub for Bucks County. Parts of the township consist of the neighborhoods of Fairless Hills and Levittown. It is located within the Philadelphia metropolitan area.

== History ==
Before Bristol Township was settled, it was populated by the Lenape Indian tribe. It was formed as Buckingham Township in 1692 and was renamed Bristol Township in 1702. The springs at Bath, in Bristol Township, were popular among wealthy Philadelphians for a time, but lost popularity to those in Saratoga Springs, New York. The Delaware Canal was built in 1831 and connected Bristol to Easton, 60 miles to the north. Still, until the 1950s, Bristol Township was largely agricultural. In 1952, William Levitt began construction of his Levittown, which was located partly in Bristol Township.

The Phineas Pemberton House was listed on the National Register of Historic Places in 1971.

The War Dog Memorial, located in front of the Bristol Township Municipal Building, was dedicated in 2006.

== Geography ==
According to the U.S. Census Bureau, the township has a total area of 17.1 square miles (44 km^{2}), of which 15.8 square miles (41 km^{2}) is land and 1.3 square miles (3.4 km^{2}) (7.42%) is water.

Named places, past and present, in Bristol Township include Bath, Croydon, Edgely, Emilie, part of Levittown, Midway, Newportville, Pickpocket, and Pine Grove.

Natural features include Mill Creek, Neshaminy Creek, and Queen Anne Creek.

== Demographics ==
Historical population
Census	Pop.	Note	%±
1890	1,591		—
1900	1,397		−12.2%
1910	1,992		42.6%
1920	5,027		152.4%
1930	4,381		−12.9%
1940	5,857		33.7%
1950	12,184		108.0%
1960	59,298		386.7%
1970	67,498		13.8%
1980	58,733		−13.0%
1990	57,129		−2.7%
2000	55,521		−2.8%
2010	54,582		−1.7%
2020	54,291		−0.5%

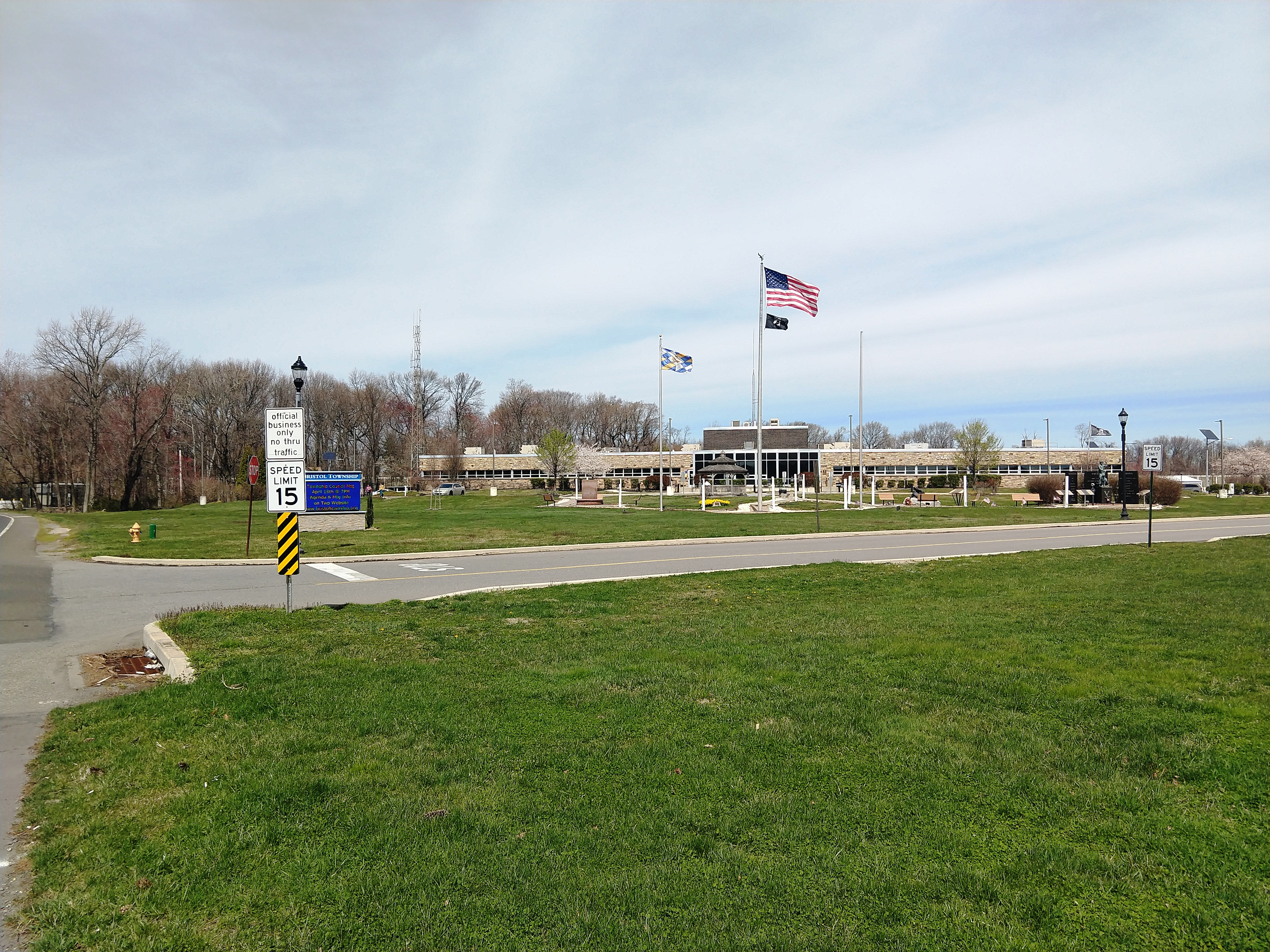
Bristol Township Municipal Building

As of the 2010 census, the township was 77.3% Non-Hispanic White, 10.2% Black or African American, 0.2% Native American, 2.8% Asian, and 2.8% were two or more races. 7.4% of the population were of Hispanic or Latino ancestry.

As of the census of 2000, there were 55,521 people, 19,733 households, and 14,503 families residing in the township. The population density was 3,439.4 people per square mile (1,328.0 people/km^{2}). There were 20,486 housing units at an average density of 1,269.1 per square mile (490.0/km^{2}). The racial makeup of the township was 86.13% White, 8.45% African American, 0.21% Native American, 2.14% Asian, 0.04% Pacific Islander, 1.55% from other races, and 1.49% from two or more races. Hispanic or Latino of any race were 3.85% of the population.

There were 19,733 households, out of which 33.6% had children under the age of 18 living with them, 54.3% were married couples living together, 13.4% had a female householder with no husband present, and 26.5% were non-families. 21.2% of all households were made up of individuals, and 8.3% had someone living alone who was 65 years of age or older. The average household size was 2.79 and the average family size was 3.26.

In the township the population was spread out, with 25.8% under the age of 18, 8.8% from 18 to 24, 31.3% from 25 to 44, 21.4% from 45 to 64, and 12.7% who were 65 years of age or older. The median age was 36 years. For every 100 females, there were 97.6 males. For every 100 females age 18 and over, there were 94.9 males.

The median income for a household in the township was $48,090, and the median income for a family was $54,308. Males had a median income of $38,112 versus $28,797 for females. The per capita income for the township was $19,090. About 5.4% of families and 7.6% of the population were below the poverty line, including 10.8% of those under age 18 and 4.5% of those age 65 or over.

== Education ==
Bristol Township students attend schools in the Bristol Township School District, and the notable public high school is Harry S. Truman High School.

Until 1990, for a period of over 12 years, the Lower Bucks Christian Academy leased the Benjamin Franklin Junior High School facility. That year, the school district denied renewal of the lease since it wished to repurpose the building as an elementary school.

== Climate ==
According to the Köppen climate classification system, Bristol Twp has a Humid subtropical climate (Cfa). Cfa climates are characterized by all months having an average mean temperature > 32.0 °F (0.0 °C), at least four months with an average mean temperature ≥ 50.0 °F (10.0 °C), at least one month with an average mean temperature ≥ 71.6 °F (22.0 °C) and no significant precipitation difference between seasons. Although most summer days are slightly humid in Bristol Twp, episodes of heat and high humidity can occur with heat index values > 108 °F (42 °C). Since 1981, the highest air temperature was 103.1 °F (39.5 °C) on June 7, 2010, and the highest daily average mean dew point was 75.4 °F (24.1 °C) on August 13, 2016. The average wettest month is July which corresponds with the annual peak in thunderstorm activity. Since 1981, the wettest calendar day was 6.42 inches (163 mm) on August 27, 2011. During the winter months, the average annual extreme minimum air temperature is 2.0 °F (−16.7 °C). Since 1981, the coldest air temperature was −9.4 °F (−23.0 °C) on January 22, 1984. Episodes of extreme cold and wind can occur with wind chill values < −8 °F (−22 °C). The average annual snowfall (Nov-Apr) is between 24 and 30 inches (61 and 76 cm). Ice storms and large snowstorms depositing ≥ 12 inches (30 cm) occur once every few years, particularly during nor’easters from December through February.

Climate data for Bristol Twp, Elevation 33 ft (10 m), 1981-2010 normals, extremes 1981-2018
Month	Jan	Feb	Mar	Apr	May	Jun	Jul	Aug	Sep	Oct	Nov	Dec	Year
Record high °F (°C)	71.8 (22.1)	78.0 (25.6)	87.8 (31.0)	95.0 (35.0)	96.0 (35.6)	97.1 (36.2)	103.1 (39.5)	101.1 (38.4)	98.9 (37.2)	89.1 (31.7)	81.6 (27.6)	76.3 (24.6)	103.1 (39.5)
Mean daily maximum °F (°C)	41.2 (5.1)	44.0 (6.7)	52.0 (11.1)	64.1 (17.8)	73.5 (23.1)	82.7 (28.2)	86.9 (30.5)	85.3 (29.6)	78.5 (25.8)	67.2 (19.6)	56.3 (13.5)	45.2 (7.3)	64.8 (18.2)
Daily mean °F (°C)	33.2 (0.7)	35.0 (1.7)	42.2 (5.7)	52.9 (11.6)	62.1 (16.7)	71.6 (22.0)	76.2 (24.6)	74.7 (23.7)	67.7 (19.8)	56.2 (13.4)	46.6 (8.1)	36.9 (2.7)	54.6 (12.6)
Mean daily minimum °F (°C)	25.1 (−3.8)	25.9 (−3.4)	32.4 (0.2)	41.6 (5.3)	50.7 (10.4)	60.5 (15.8)	65.6 (18.7)	64.2 (17.9)	56.9 (13.8)	45.2 (7.3)	36.9 (2.7)	28.5 (−1.9)	44.5 (6.9)
Record low °F (°C)	−9.4 (−23.0)	−2.4 (−19.1)	4.4 (−15.3)	18.0 (−7.8)	33.0 (0.6)	42.1 (5.6)	48.3 (9.1)	43.0 (6.1)	36.6 (2.6)	25.5 (−3.6)	12.4 (−10.9)	0.3 (−17.6)	−9.4 (−23.0)
Average precipitation inches (mm)	3.59 (91)	2.72 (69)	4.27 (108)	3.85 (98)	4.20 (107)	4.21 (107)	5.02 (128)	4.34 (110)	4.05 (103)	3.71 (94)	3.43 (87)	3.93 (100)	47.32 (1,202)
Average relative humidity (%)	64.9	61.2	57.8	56.8	61.9	65.4	66.2	68.4	68.8	68.1	66.4	66.5	64.4
Average dew point °F (°C)	22.0 (−5.6)	23.0 (−5.0)	28.4 (−2.0)	38.0 (3.3)	48.9 (9.4)	59.4 (15.2)	64.1 (17.8)	63.6 (17.6)	57.1 (13.9)	45.8 (7.7)	36.0 (2.2)	26.8 (−2.9)	42.9 (6.1)
Source: PRISM

== Ecology ==
According to the A. W. Kuchler U.S. potential natural vegetation types, Bristol Township would have a dominant vegetation type of Appalachian Oak (104) with a dominant vegetation form of Eastern Hardwood Forest (25). The plant hardiness zone is 7a with an average annual extreme minimum air temperature of 2.0 °F (−16.7 °C). The spring bloom typically begins by April 7 and fall color usually peaks by November 4.

== Transportation ==
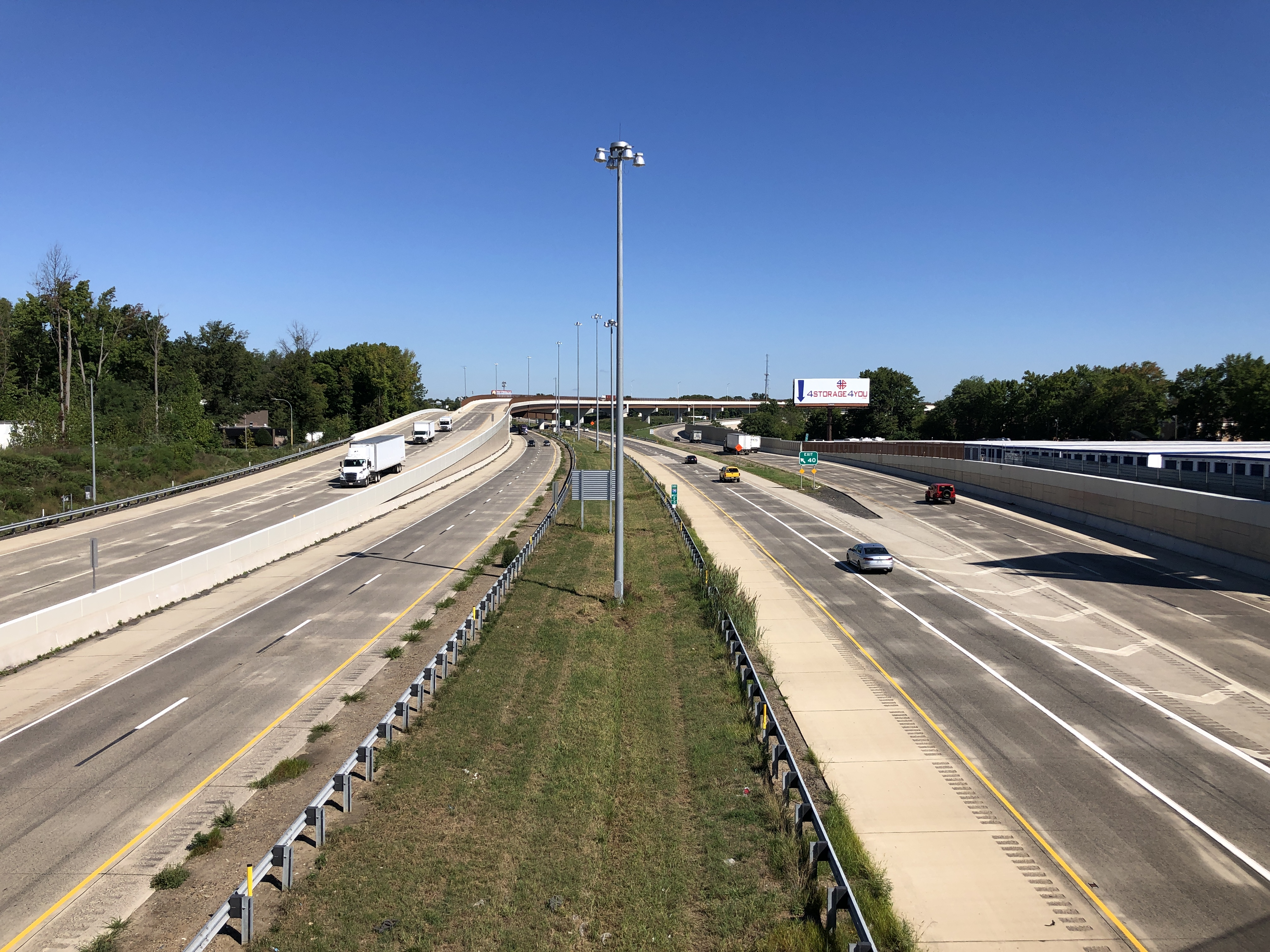
View northbound along I-95 at its interchange with I-295 and the PA Turnpike in Bristol Township

As of 2022 there were 203.47 miles (327.45 km) of public roads in Bristol Township, of which 3.80 miles (6.12 km) were maintained by the Pennsylvania Turnpike Commission (PTC), 27.45 miles (44.18 km) were maintained by the Pennsylvania Department of Transportation (PennDOT) and 172.22 miles (277.16 km) were maintained by the township.

Bristol Township is the location of a major highway junction between Interstate 95, the Pennsylvania Turnpike (Interstate 276), and Interstate 295. This interchange is still partially under construction, with the project to build it ongoing. Interstate 95 follows the Pennsylvania Turnpike between the interchange and the Delaware River–Turnpike Toll Bridge over the Delaware River. Other highways serving Bristol Township include U.S. Route 13, which runs southwest–northeast through the township along Bristol Pike, and Pennsylvania Route 413, which runs north–south through the township along Veterans Highway and leads to the Burlington–Bristol Bridge over the Delaware River. SEPTA provides bus service to Bristol Township along Suburban Bus routes 127, 128, and 129. SEPTA Regional Rail's Trenton Line serves the Croydon section of the township at Croydon station, with other nearby stations including Bristol station in the borough of Bristol and Levittown station in the borough of Tullytown.
