= War Dog Memorial (Bristol Township, Pennsylvania) =

Coordinates: 40.1240°N 74.8688°W

The War Dog Memorial was dedicated to the thousands of War Dogs that served during World War I, World War II, the Korean War, the Vietnam War, the Persian Gulf War, Bosnia, Iraq, and Afghanistan. The memorial also recognizes the service that War Dogs give to the United States of America on countless missions around the world for the Army, Navy, Air Force, Coast Guard, and Marines. The Memorial was dedicated September 16, 2006. Joseph Pavone, of Bristol Township, Pennsylvania, created the sculpture. The Memorial is located in front of the Bristol Township Municipal Building located at 2501 Bath Road, Bristol, PA, 19007.

== History ==
The War Dogs of the United States of America have a legendary history of bravery and courage on thousands of unnamed foreign fields of battle. Military analysts estimate that there were as many as ten thousand United States and Allied lives saved during the Vietnam War alone. The casualty rates in all of the other wars were significantly reduced by thousands as a result of deploying the War Dogs.

== Duties ==
War Dogs have performed many varied tasks under their assigned duties, including the following:

- Scout
- Sentry
- Tracker
- Mine & Booby Trap
- Tunnel
- Water Patrol
- Coast Guard
- Search & Rescue
- Explosive Detection

== See also ==
- Bristol Township, Bucks County, Pennsylvania
- Dogs in warfare
- List of individual dogs
- 1st Military Working Dog Regiment
- World War I
- World War II
- Korean War
- Vietnam War
- Gulf War
- Bosnian War
- Iraq War
- War in Afghanistan (2001–present)
- Military history of the United States
