= Croydon, Pennsylvania =

Croydon
- Census-designated place
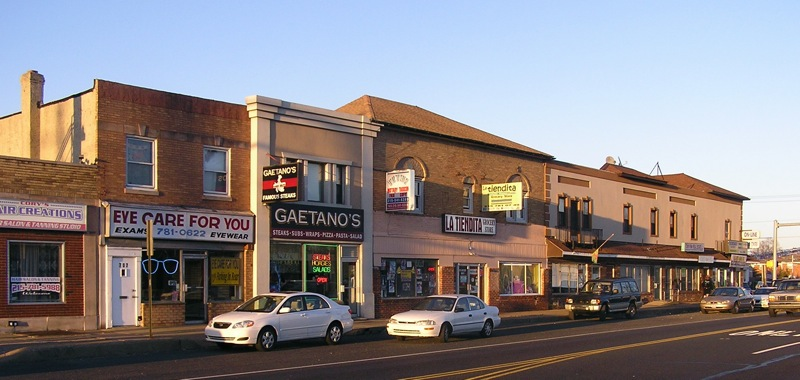
- Downtown Croydon, Pennsylvania

- Location of Croydon in Pennsylvania Croydon (the United States)
- Coordinates: 40°05′36″N 74°53′57″W
- Country: United States of America
- State: Pennsylvania
- County: Bucks
- Township: Bristol

Area
  - Total: 2.68 sq mi (6.95 km^{2})
  - Land: 2.48 sq mi (6.42 km^{2})
  - Water: 0.21 sq mi (0.54 km^{2})
- Elevation: 20 ft (6.1 m)

Population (2020)
  - Total: 10,014
  - Density: 4,040.7/sq mi (1,560.13/km^{2})
- Time zone: UTC-5 (EST)
  - Summer (DST): UTC-4 (EDT)
- ZIP code: 19021
- Area codes: 215, 267, and 445
- FIPS code: 42-17448

Croydon is a census-designated place located in Bristol Township, Bucks County, Pennsylvania, United States. As of the 2010 census, the CDP had a total population of 9,950.

Croydon is located 68.9 miles (110.9 km) southeast of Allentown and 18.5 miles (29.8 km) northeast of Philadelphia.

== History ==
The name Croydon comes from the town of Croydon in South-East England; nine miles south of the historic center of London, it was traditionally part of Surrey but is now the center of the London Borough of Croydon.

The White Hall of Bristol College was listed on the National Register of Historic Places in 1984.

== Law and government ==
Croydon does not have a central government of its own. It is not organized or incorporated as a town or village. The area known as Croydon is located in Bristol Township. Croydon has an all-volunteer fire company which handles fire, medical, marine, and other calls servicing the community named Croydon Fire Company #1. Croydon uses zip code 19021.

== Geography ==
Croydon is located at 40°5′26″N 74°53′57″W.

According to the United States Census Bureau, the CDP has a total area of 6.4 km^{2} (2.5 sq mi), all land. Croydon is bordered to the south by Neshaminy Creek, which is tidal, and navigable by small vessels (approximately 8 ft (2.4 m) to 6 ft (1.8 m) draft at high tide). There are several private marinas on the Neshaminy, and a Commonwealth of Pennsylvania marina (part of Neshaminy State Park) at the mouth of the creek. The Neshaminy empties into the Delaware River, which borders Croydon to the east, and forms the boundary between Pennsylvania and New Jersey. The Delaware is tidal in Croydon, and is navigable by ocean-going vessels (40 foot marked / maintained channel) as far upriver as Trenton, New Jersey.

Croydon has a humid subtropical climate and average monthly temperatures range from 32.8 °F in January to 76.6 °F in July. The local hardiness zone is 7a.

== Demographics ==
Historical population
Census	Pop.	Note	%±
1990	9,967		—
2000	9,993		0.3%
2010	9,950		−0.4%
2020	10,014		0.6%

=== 2020 census ===
As of the 2020 census, Croydon had a population of 10,014. The median age was 40.6 years. 20.3% of residents were under the age of 18 and 15.1% of residents were 65 years of age or older. For every 100 females there were 100.1 males, and for every 100 females age 18 and over there were 101.3 males age 18 and over.

100.0% of residents lived in urban areas, while 0.0% lived in rural areas.

There were 3,831 households in Croydon, of which 29.5% had children under the age of 18 living in them. Of all households, 43.1% were married-couple households, 21.0% were households with a male householder and no spouse or partner present, and 26.0% were households with a female householder and no spouse or partner present. About 26.3% of all households were made up of individuals and 9.2% had someone living alone who was 65 years of age or older.

There were 3,982 housing units, of which 3.8% were vacant. The homeowner vacancy rate was 1.8% and the rental vacancy rate was 3.1%.

Racial composition as of the 2020 census
Race	Number	Percent
White	7,533	75.2%
Black or African American	686	6.9%
American Indian and Alaska Native	57	0.6%
Asian	300	3.0%
Native Hawaiian and Other Pacific Islander	1	0.0%
Some other race	658	6.6%
Two or more races	779	7.8%
Hispanic or Latino (of any race)	1,324	13.2%

=== 2010 census ===
As of the 2010 census, Croydon was 82.9% White, 4.8% Black or African American, 0.2% Native American, 2.9% Asian, 0.1% some other race, and 1.6% were two or more races. 7.4% of the population was of Hispanic or Latino ancestry.

=== 2000 census ===
As of the census of 2000, there were 9,993 people, 3,735 households, and 2,577 families living in the CDP. The population density was 4,029.9 inhabitants per square mile (1,556.0/km^{2}). There were 3,875 housing units at an average density of 1,562.7 per square mile (603.4/km^{2}). The racial makeup of the CDP was 93.30% White, 2.89% African American, 0.31% Native American, 1.28% Asian, 0.01% Pacific Islander, 1.18% from other races, and 1.03% from two or more races. 3.68% of the population were Hispanic or Latino of any race.

There were 3,735 households, out of which 31.7% had children under the age of 18 living with them, 51.4% were married couples living together, 11.3% had a female householder with no husband present, and 31.0% were non-families. 25.3% of all households were made up of individuals, and 8.0% had someone living alone who was 65 years of age or older. The average household size was 2.67 and the average family size was 3.24.

In the CDP, the population was spread out, with 24.6% under the age of 18, 9.5% from 18 to 24, 33.0% from 25 to 44, 22.0% from 45 to 64, and 10.9% who were 65 years of age or older. The median age was 36 years. For every 100 females, there were 103.5 males. For every 100 females age 18 and over, there were 100.9 males.

The median income for a household in the CDP was $46,858, and the median income for a family was $55,660. Males had a median income of $37,574 versus $27,069 for females. The per capita income for the CDP was $19,751. 5.7% of the population and 3.9% of families were below the poverty line. Out of the total population, 8.9% of those under the age of 18 and 1.7% of those 65 and older were living below the poverty line.

== Education ==
The Roman Catholic Archdiocese of Philadelphia announced in 2011 that St. Thomas Aquinas School was closing as the number of students had declined.
