= Drama High (book) =

2013 non-fiction book by Michael Sokolove

- First edition
- Author: Michael Sokolove
- Language: English
- Subject: Performing arts
- Published: September 16, 2013
- Publisher: Riverhead Books
- Publication place: United States
- Pages: 338
- ISBN: 978-1-59448-822-1
- OCLC: 852399924

Drama High: The Incredible True Story of a Brilliant Teacher, a Struggling Town, and the Magic of Theater, or simply Drama High, is a 2013 nonfiction book by The New York Times Magazine writer Michael Sokolove that follows a year in the life of the drama program of Harry S. Truman High School in Levittown, Pennsylvania.

== Overview ==
Journalist Sokolove tells the story of a year spent at his old school, Harry S Truman High School, chronicling the school's drama program led by master teacher Lou Volpe. In his 40 years of teaching there, Volpe revolutionized the theater program in Levittown, Pennsylvania, a blue-collar town that has been on a slow economic downswing since the 1960s. Truman has become known for its drama program thanks to Volpe, whose productions draw not only critical acclaim but also the attention of famous theater producers, who have used the program to try out school-appropriate adaptations of controversial Broadway shows. According to The Philadelphia Inquirer, "The talents he molds is stunning, several levels above the typical high school production ... the apex arriving when Broadway producers and titans of the theater routinely make the pilgrimage to Levittown, there to sit on wooden planks in a shabby auditorium and marvel at what is unfolding on stage."

== Television adaptation ==
In January 2017, NBC ordered a pilot from Jason Katims based on Sokolove's book. Katims wrote the script, and also served as an executive producer alongside Jeffrey Seller, Michelle Lee and Flody Suarez. The pilot was ordered to series with the title Rise on May 5, 2017.
