= Michael Sokolove =

American journalist and author

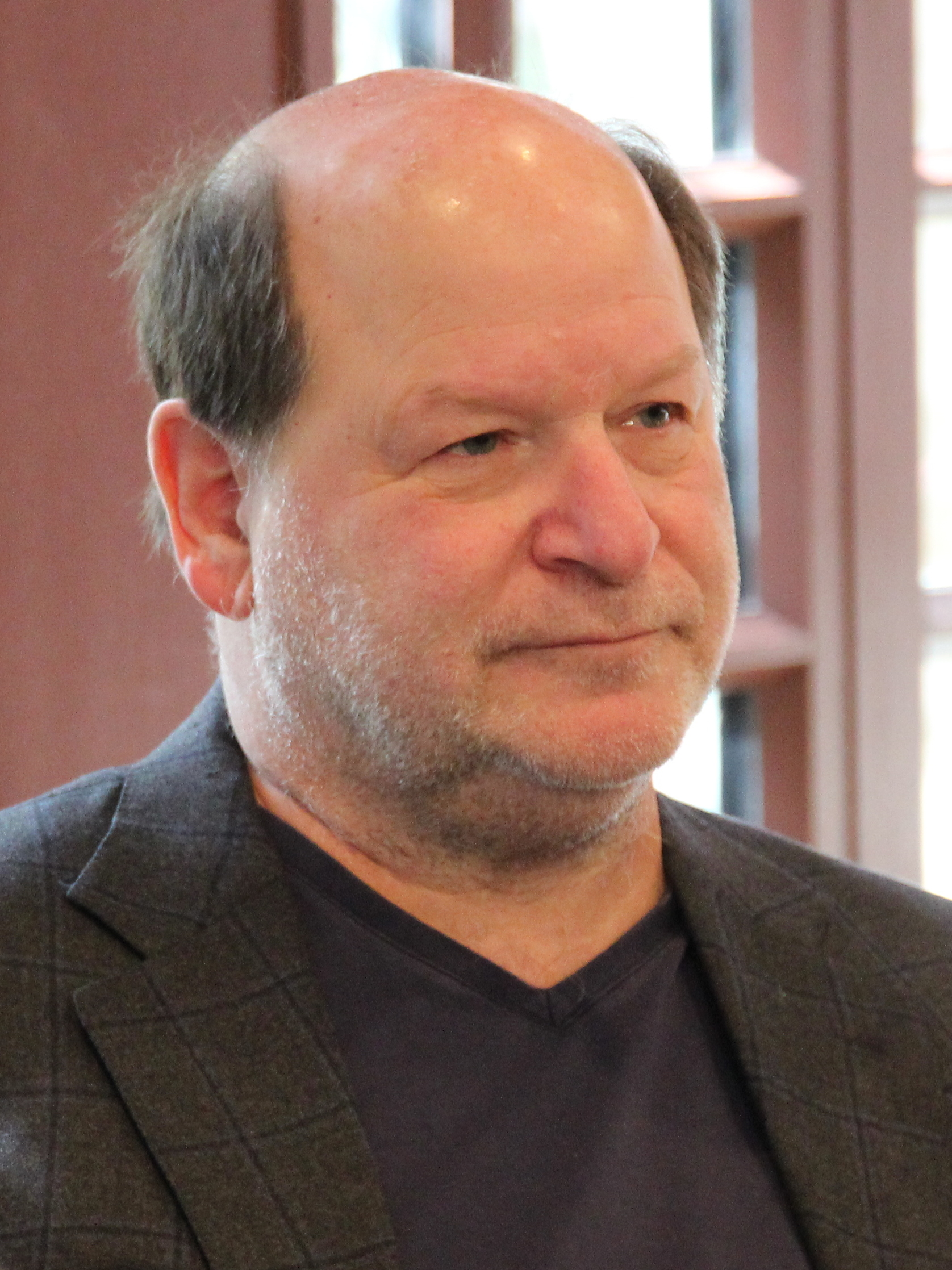
Sokolove in 2025

Michael Sokolove is an American journalist and author. He has worked for The New York Times Magazine since 2001. His books include Hustle: The Myth, Life, and Lies of Pete Rose, about Pete Rose and his banishment from baseball, and The Ticket Out: Darryl Strawberry and the Boys of Crenshaw, about Darryl Strawberry's high school baseball team.

The New York Times positively reviewed The Ticket Out, describing the portrayal of Strawberry and his teammates as a "choral narrative" and "simple and affecting. Roger Angell, of The New Yorker, wrote that Hustle was "a first-class work of sound reporting and balanced, piece-by-piece evidence and inescapable conclusions."

Drama High: The Incredible True Story of a Brilliant Teacher, a Struggling Town, and the Magic of Theater, published in 2013, was optioned by Hamilton lead producer Jeffrey Seller and served as the inspiration for the television series Rise.

Sokolove has also contributed to Sports Illustrated, The Washington Post, and Mother Jones. Two of his articles have been included in The Best American Sports Writing anthologies, in 2006 and 2010.

== Books ==
- Hustle: The Myth, Life, and Lies of Pete Rose ( Simon and Schuster, 1990) ISBN 9780743284448
- The Ticket Out: Darryl Strawberry and the Boys of Crenshaw ( Simon & Schuster, 2004) ISBN 9781439129043
- Warrior Girls: Protecting Our Daughters Against the Injury Epidemic in Women's Sports (New York : Simon & Schuster, 2008) ISBN 9781416579625
- Drama High: The Incredible True Story of a Brilliant Teacher, a Struggling Town, and the Magic of Theater (Penguin. 2013)
- The Last Temptation of Rick Pitino: A Story of Corruption, Scandal, and the Big Business of College Basketball Penguin Books, 2018 ISBN 9780399563294
