= Cornwells Heights =

Cornwells Heights may refer to:

- Cornwells Heights, Pennsylvania, census-designated place in United States
- Cornwells Heights station, rail station near Philadelphia, Pennsylvania, United States
- Cornwells Heights-Eddington, Pennsylvania, census-designated place in United States
