= Levittown station =

Rail station in Tullytown, Pennsylvania, US

Levittown
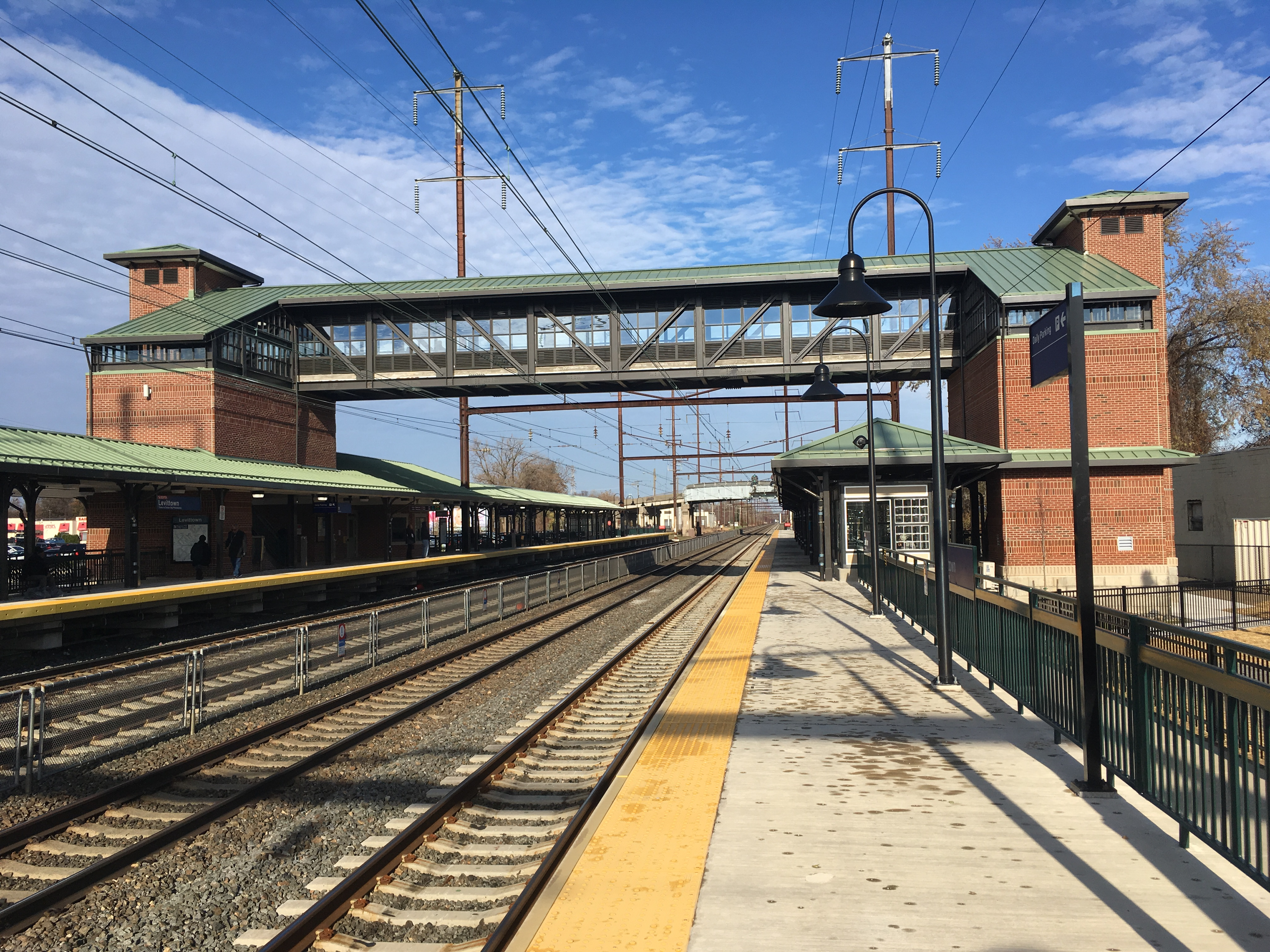
- Levittown station viewed from the outbound platform in 2019

General information
- Location: 8301 Bristol Pike (US 13); Tullytown, Pennsylvania
- Coordinates: 40°08′25″N 74°49′02″W
- Owner: Southeastern Pennsylvania Transportation Authority
- Line: Amtrak Northeast Corridor
- Platforms: 2 side platforms
- Tracks: 4
- Connections: SEPTA Suburban Bus: 127

Construction
- Parking: 452 spaces
- Cycle facilities: 8 rack spaces
- Accessible: Yes

Other information
- Fare zone: 4

History
- Opened: April 26, 1953
- Rebuilt: 2015–2019

Passengers
- 2017: 548 boardings (weekday average)
- Rank: 43 of 146

Services
Preceding station	SEPTA	Following station
Bristol toward Temple University	Trenton Line	Trenton Terminus
Former services
Preceding station	Pennsylvania Railroad	Following station
Edgely toward Suburban Station	Trenton Line	Morrisville toward Trenton
Location

Levittown (formerly known as Levittown–Tullytown) is an active commuter railroad station in the borough of Tullytown, Bucks County, Pennsylvania. Serving trains of SEPTA Regional Rail's Trenton Line, the station sits at the junction of U.S. Route 13 (Bristol Pike) and Levittown Parkway. The station has two high-level side platforms, connected by a pedestrian overpass. Amtrak services along the Northeast Corridor bypass the station. The next station to the north is Trenton Transit Center and the next station to the south is Bristol.

Levittown station opened on April 26, 1953, replacing a former Pennsylvania Railroad station at Cheston Avenue known as Tullytown, which opened in 1833. The station was a product of the construction of Levittown, a development of over 16,000 homes by Levitt & Sons. The station consisted of two low-level side platforms, a concrete underpass to connect platforms and a fieldstone ticket office. From the beginning of the station's history, multiple groups have worked to get more service between Levittown and Center City, Philadelphia, driving up ridership over a 20-year span since it opened. Amtrak serviced the station briefly in 1971 at the beginning of the agency's creation. SEPTA replaced the station from 2015–2019 to make it accessible for handicapped people, replacing it with two high-level platforms, an overpass instead of an underpass and a redesigned parking lot.

== History ==
=== Tullytown station (1832–1950) ===
Railroad service in the area of Tullytown began on November 14, 1833 with the opening of the Philadelphia and Trenton Railroad between Morrisville and Bristol. The 8.75-mile (14.08 km) line was operated by horseback with rail cars. By August 1834, there were three trains between Morrisville and Bristol every day in each direction. Service from Bristol to the Kensington District, began on November 3, 1834. The first station depot at Tullytown was built in 1836.

=== Construction of Levittown (1951–1954) ===
Levitt & Sons announced on August 21, 1951 that they would build a new community of 16,000 houses. This new project would involve over 2,000 acres (810 ha) in Tullytown and Fallsington, Pennsylvania. The project, named Levittown, was based on the Levittown, New York they had built in Nassau County, New York and be 2 miles (3.2 km) from U.S. Steel's plant. The construction of new houses began in late October 1951, with equipment coming from the New York site as the completion of that project was expected by the end of November. Plans were that 150 new homes would be built on the land each week. Three homes were in place by December 11. The first families would move to Levittown in June 1952.

Local advertising noted that the Pennsylvania Railroad would build a new train station to help commuters reach Philadelphia in just over a half-hour. With the construction of Levittown and plans for a new train station, locals in Tullytown were concerned about the borough of Tullytown losing its name in the area. The Pennsylvania Railroad placed signs at Tullytown station in February 1952 that the new station would be built on the edge of the borough rather than in the center of Tullytown, causing local resentment. The construction also caused locals to have concern that the construction of the new station at Levittown would eliminate not just Tullytown station, but the stops at Edgely and Bristol, as there would be four stations in a 3-mile (4.8 km) stretch of railroad.

Levittown station would be a modern construction similar to the one built at Curtis Park station. This new depot would be different from the Curtis Park one as it would be architecture in the area of Bucks County rather than a full replica. Levittown station would be 50 by 27 feet (15.2 m × 8.2 m) in design, with fieldstone. The new station would have a ticket office and waiting room, along with a baggage office and restrooms for passengers. The station would have two 300-foot (91 m) long platforms that would also have 100-foot (30 m) wide shelters. There would also be a 1,000-car parking lot on U.S. Route 13 at the junction of Levittown Boulevard, a new street part of the construction. Construction of a new station at Levittown began in September 1952 west of the Tullytown station on the site of a local farm in Bristol Township. By September 26, concrete for the station's foundation was being poured. However, the railroad would not confirm or deny the design of the depot. William Levitt stated on November 26 that the station would be finished by January 1, 1953 and they were working in coordination with the Pennsylvania Railroad to ensure trains would run when Levittown was ready for passenger service.

In December, the members of the Levittown Civic Association passed out a survey to find out how many of their residents would use the new station once it upon opening. The survey also asked what time of day the people would use the train service and where they would use it to go. The survey was completed in late January 1953. The results were that the station should be built in the Pinewood section of Levittown as that was where 40% of the commuters were. 591 of residents who commuted by train, 234 of which were from Pinewood. Most of those surveyed would go to North Philadelphia station or Center City, Philadelphia on trains between 7:30–8:00 a.m. and return on a train from 5:00–5:30 p.m. The Pennsylvania Railroad made their own survey in February 1953. Locals of the Levittown Civic Association's Transportation Committee noted that while trains were passing the new station, but not stopping. The committee's leader, Alexander Kopstein, stated that they were talking to railroad officials and pressured them for trains to stop at Levittown station. Kopstein added that he and the committee created a new bus map and would post it in the Levittown Exhibition Center.

At a meeting of the Tullytown Borough Council on March 9, 50 residents of the borough attended and showed their concern for the railroad crossing in Tullytown and the fate of the train station once Levittown station. Locals stated they were promised that the new Levittown station would have an underpass under the tracks for pedestrians to use in Tullytown. The railroad never told local officials on the fate of Tullytown station and the officials, including the borough postmaster, were upset. The postmaster stated that she would want to discuss with Pennsylvania Railroad officials about how hard it was to cross the railroad tracks. She added that the new station should have Tullytown signage on the east platform while the west side would have signage for Levittown.

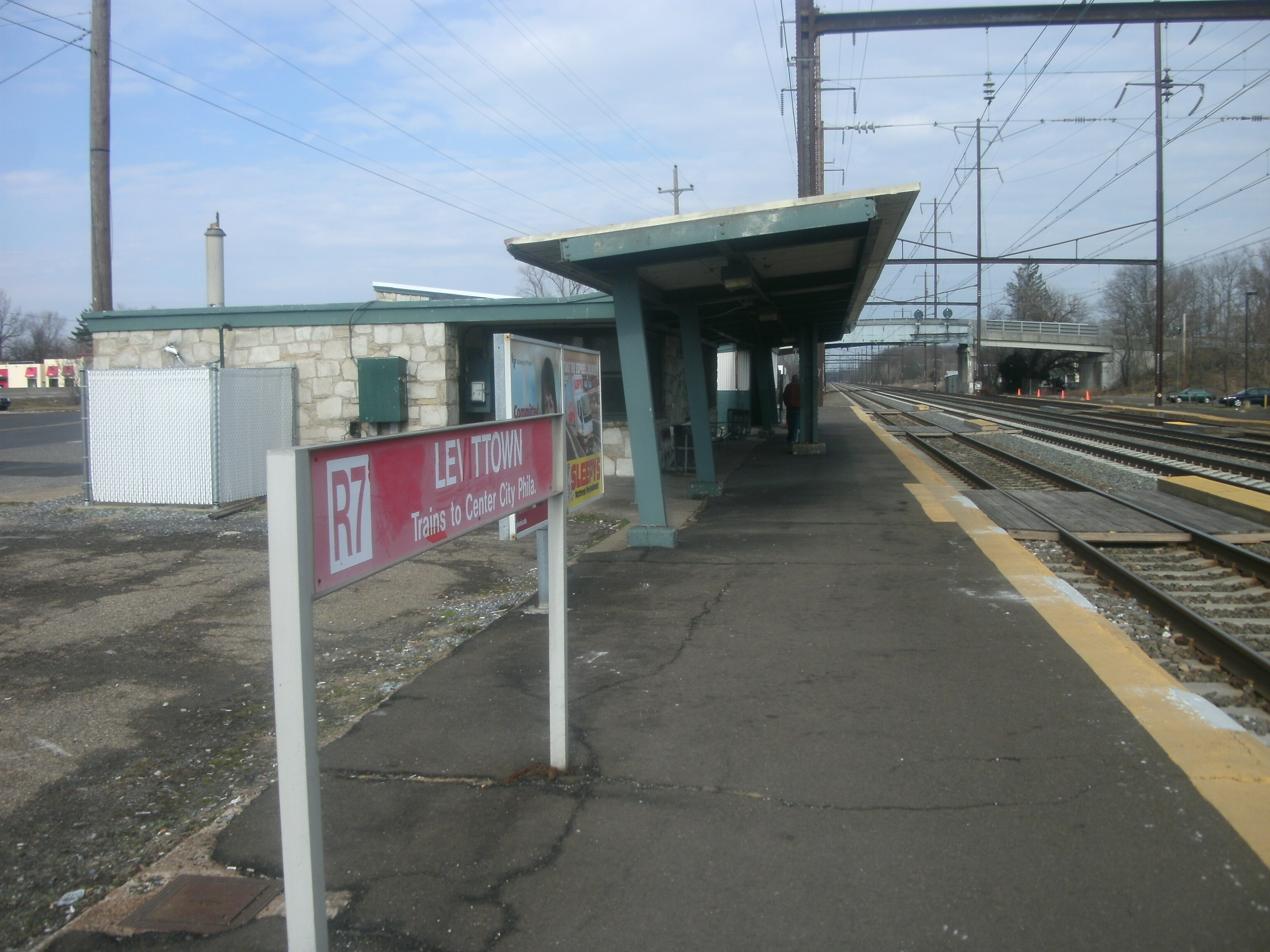
The former southbound low-level platform with former R7 signage in 2012

The railroad announced on March 13, 1953 that the new station would open around April 1 and until then, the station at Tullytown would receive seven more local trains for commuters. The Levittown Civic Association met on March 17 to discuss demand for more railroad service to Levittown station. The group stated that they wanted express service to Philadelphia from Levittown station and that the directors of the organization would have to send "strongly worded telegrams" to railroad management. Their reasoning was that the Levittown station or the Tullytown station deserved express service because it had surpassed the population of nearby Bristol. The Pennsylvania Railroad responded to the Civic Association's request on April 11, noting that Levittown station would get two express trains from and to Philadelphia. However, they stated that the statistics the railroad provided the Public Utilities Commission were only commuters who would go from Tullytown station to Levittown. The number would not consider ridership from Edgely, Bristol and Trenton stations.

Pennsylvania Railroad and Tullytown borough officials held at a meeting at the home of Fred Rentschler, the Borough Council secretary. The railroad told officials that the new station was already a financial loss for the railroad and that construction of an overpass or tunnel would cost $50,000–$100,000 to the damage. Borough officials released a statement to the press that William Levitt had built a station as an advertising product, rather than for commutation. They added that when Levitt learned about the underpass not being financially feasible, that he should have asked the railroad to move the station to the Fallsington Avenue bridge for safety and convenience. Levitt's spokesperson denied this accusation and that it was set where it was for the use of the majority of Levittown residents. The press were told that the railroad did designs and planning for the new station and while Levitt was the general contractor for the project, the railroad paid for the station and owned the property. The borough committee stated that the railroad spent $175,000 for the construction of the station and did not make one that would be convenient for everyone. They suggested that the railroad and Levitt should share funds for a foot crossing to Tullytown.

On April 15, the Pennsylvania Railroad released the schedule for Levittown station, effective April 26. The April 26 opening date was chosen by the railroad as it was the start of daylight savings time. The ticket office would open the next day and operated part time. Train 3857 from Trenton would arrive at Levittown at 6:03 a.m. and head to Central City, Philadelphia. Train 3854 left Suburban and would arrive at Levittown at 5:03 p.m. A new commuter's express train would also begin on June 29. As part of the announcement, service would end at Tullytown station. There also was an announcement that the railroad would spend $50,000 for a new railroad underpass at Levittown station to make things better for Tullytown residents.

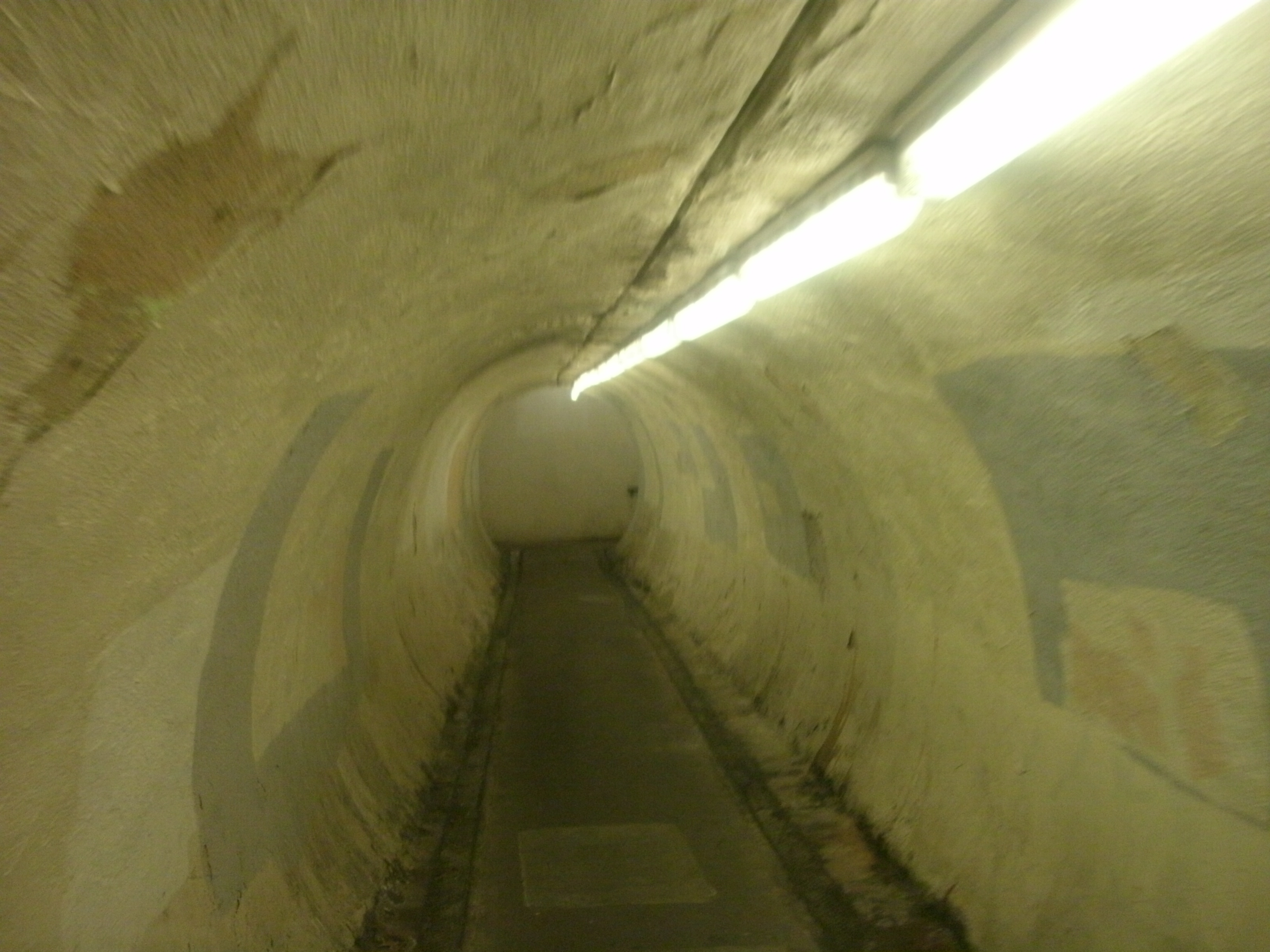
The former pedestrian underpass at Levittown station, seen in 2012

The Levittown–Tullytown station opened on April 26 and the wife of Nelson Bean, a former ticket agent at Rahway station in New Jersey and resident of Levittown, became the ticket agent for the station.

In July 1953, the railroad announced that construction of the new underpass would begin within a few days after July 15. A contract was awarded by the Pennsylvania Railroad to James McGraw Company of Philadelphia and completion was expected by October. The new underpass would be 80 feet (24 m) long and shaped like an oval with plaster curved walls. It would be 7.41 feet (2.26 m) wide and 9.33 feet (2.84 m) high. By the end of July, it was expected that the construction would begin by the first week of August. However, due to underground springs being discovered under the tracks, the project was delayed. Instead, cement was installed in late January 1954 to prevent seeping water and the underpass would open on February 4, 1954.

=== Operation Levittown (1961–1966) ===
On September 1, 1961, Bucks County, along with Chester, Delaware, and Montgomery Counties all announced a deal with the city of Philadelphia to help bring more railroad and bus service various parts of the metropolitan area. Deemed the Southeastern Pennsylvania Compact (SEPACT), this agreement would subsidize the services, resulting in low fares from destinations to and from Philadelphia. The agreement came with three separate operational plans, starting with the station in Lansdale, then Paoli, followed by Levittown. The five counties would also work on getting funding under the 1961 Housing Act, which would allow $25 million (1961 USD) for mass transit. Bucks County officials signed the contract on September 5 and would be represented by two people on the committee overseeing the projects. The Levittown plans, dubbed "Operation Levittown", would focus on upgrading rail facilities along the Pennsylvania Railroad between Philadelphia and Trenton, but that any plans would wait until the similarly named "Operation Lansdale" showed any positive results before beginning Levittown work.

The Bucks County Commissioners met in Doylestown on April 9, 1962. At that meeting, they agreed to begin applying for federal funding to help reduce the fares as part of "Operation Levittown" and the recently created, "Operation North Penn", a similar project on the Reading Railroad to work on service to Lansdale and Hatboro. As part of this agreement, the federal government would provide 66% of the funds for operating trains, while the five counties would pay the last 34%. As part of it, the fares on services would drop in a range of 15–40% and Bucks County would spend $60,000 in 1963 for the efforts. As part of their agreement, they would provide $15,000 for the Levittown service and if the approval came from the federal government, the service would start on September 1.

The officials of the Southeastern Pennsylvania Transportation Compact announced that October 28, 1962 would become the first date of the new "Operation Levittown" services. The date was to reflect when schedules were changed as part of the ending of daylight savings time in 1962. The officials noted that they were waiting on approval of $2.9 million grant, which would join $4.5 million from Philadelphia, Montgomery and Bucks Counties to help offer better railroad and bus service in the area. The line between Philadelphia and Trenton would get several extra trains, but the official number would be dependent on how much funding the federal government would offer. The federal government approved a $3.116 million grant for the "Operation Levittown" and "Operation North Penn" services on October 23, 1962. However, the Levittown service would be delayed several weeks from the original October 28 date, as the Pennsylvania Railroad had to adjust schedules on three different divisions, whereas the North Penn service would only be on the Reading Railroad and service would start on October 28 as scheduled. As part of the changes, the Pennsylvania Railroad would add five new trains between Trenton and Philadelphia on weekdays, from 12 to 17. Saturday service would also see an increase, going from nine to 13 trains. There would be no changes to the services operated on Sundays. The fares between Levittown and Philadelphia would go from $1.31 to 70¢ one-way as part of a 24-ride commutation ticket. Projections expected that 1,000 people would go from Levittown to Philadelphia as part of the project, an increase over the 600 using the services up to that point. The new date for service on the Pennsylvania Railroad would be on November 29.

However, the date was pushed to December 3 and the railroad announced that the new service would be three express trains to Philadelphia in the morning rush hour and two express trains to Levittown in the afternoon. The three morning trains would havenames, with the 7:00 a.m. service from Levittown dubbed the Early Bird Express, running express from Bristol to Philadelphia. the 7:41 a.m. train from Levittown would be the Mid-County Express, stopping at Croydon and Cornwells Heights before expressing to 30th Street Station. The third train, leaving Levittown at 8:25 a.m., would be the Delaware Valley Express, stopping at Bristol, Cornwells Heights, North Philadelphia and 30th Street before ending at Suburban Station. On the way back, the Bucks County Express would leave Suburban Station at 5:09 p.m. and stop at Cornwells Heights, Croydon, Bristol and Levittown. The second train, also named the Delaware Valley Express, would leave Suburban Station nine minutes later, stopping at 30th Street, North Philadelphia, Bristol and Levittown.

SEPACT officials also met on November 20, 1962 at the Bristol Motel to discuss a second part of the operation, repaving the Levittown station parking lot. The agency was unsure who owned the parking lot and due to public funding, if it was a private lot, they could not do the project themselves. SEPACT officials stated that they would find a way to get the lot paved. On November 21, SEPACT announced that the parking lot at Levittown station would be repaved as part of the new service. SEPACT added that they would let out bids for contracts on November 26 with the requirement that repaving began on November 27 and be finished by the beginning of "Operation Levittown" on December 3. They added that Levittown station would also have new lights installed at the station by December 3 as part of an agreement between Tullytown and SEPACT.

Opening ceremonies were held at 7:15 a.m. on December 3. As part of the ceremonies, 254 people, including press, government, railroad and SEPACT officials all got on the Mid-City Express along with the members of the Woodrow Wilson High School band. However, due to the ceremonies, the train was late ten minutes before it could depart. The train went to Philadelphia where Mayor James Tate and fellow officials met the Levittown officials to have a breakfast at a local restaurant. After the breakfast, the Levittown officials took a train back to the station. "Operation Levittown" became a success early on. Statistics suggested that the ridership was up 20% over the same five weeks in December 1961 and more than double SEPACT's expected ridership boost.

However, while locals were enthused with the new service, the promised repave of the Levittown parking lot in November never occurred. At least one local noted that it had been in the same condition after implementation of "Operation Levittown" that it had been prior. They noted excuses about the private ownership of the parking lot and the fact that the cost to purchase the lot would be too high for SEPACT. However, the owners of the parking lot stated that they were never asked about a purchase price for the lot, required to provide free parking in the deed. In March 1963, SEPACT and Rowill Investment Corporation, the legal owners of the majority of the parking lot came to an agreement to repave the parking lot. As part of this, SEPACT would do the work paving the lot and providing space for 400 cars. Groundbreaking ceremonies for the new pavement occurred on April 19, 1963 at both Levittown and Croydon stations with Bucks County, SEPACT, Pennsylvania Railroad and local officials present at both events, held an hour apart. The expansion would bring the Levittown parking lot from 225 to 380 cars and done in multiple parts to prevent the entire lot from having to be shut down. Meredith Paving Company, local to Levittown, would get the $25,000 construction for the Levittown parking lot and Philadelphia Electric would install the lighting in the parking lot. All funding would be part of the "Operation Levittown" budget and given by SEPACT. The work finished in May and operation of the parking lot would move to Auto Parks, Inc. of Devon. Locals also volunteered to add trees, flowers and bushes to the station as well. After the project, SEPACT noted that they may add more parking spaces on railroad property near the Tullytown–Old Route 13 overpass.

With the creation of the Southeastern Pennsylvania Transportation Authority (SEPTA) in 1965, Bucks County proposed in August 1965 that the organization continue the service upgrades created by "Operation Levittown" once the original agreement expired on October 31. Pennsylvania's state government also stated that the Mass Transportation Act could get Bucks County $900,000 for the continuation of service. By September 1965, studies stated that the Levittown and Hatboro services had increased rail passenger service 54% in 1965 compared to the same point in 1964. Rumor broke in late October 1965 that the "Operation Levittown" changes would likely remain in effect after a renewal. The expectation is that changes would occur but that the 1962-agreed fare structure would remain in place. Officials from the Pennsylvania Railroad stated that Levittown station had gone from 1,700 commuters in 1960 to over 6,000 and that trains between Levittown and Philadelphia went from 18 to 37.

On October 25, 1965, Bucks County Commission Chairman John Bodley stated that SEPTA, Pennsylvania Railroad, Bucks County, state and city of Philadelphia officials agreed to continue the "Operation Levittown". The new 14-month extension of the program would involve funds shared by the state, Bucks County and the city of Philadelphia. This time, the state would offer $280,000, the city would give $93,000 and the county would give $47,000, a similar setup to the original program. SEPACT would be discontinued and the federal government would not be giving funding. SEPTA took over responsibility of "Operation Levittown" on November 1, 1965 from SEPACT. In December, SEPTA released figures on "Operation Levittown", stating that from January–October 1965, ridership was up 137.2% compared to the same stretch in 1962, prior to the creation of the program. 1,272,900 people used it in the same ten month period for 1965 compared to 536,000 in 1962. SEPTA got $670,000 in funds from the state of Pennsylvania to help with the "Operation Levittown" program in late January 1966, along with other local projects.

=== Penn Central and SEPTA (1968–2012) ===
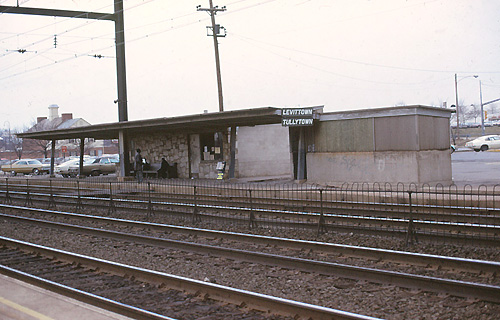
Levittown–Tullytown station in 1975 during Penn Central operation

The Pennsylvania Railroad folded into Penn Central in 1968. Amtrak took over intercity passenger service on May 1, 1971. Levittown–Tullytown station had several local train servicing it, train 263, which only operated on weekdays from Penn Station in New York City to 30th Street Station. Train 231 between the same two locations on a daily basis also serviced the station. Penn Central continued to operate local and commuter service, which passed to Conrail in 1976 then finally to SEPTA Regional Rail in 1983 as the Trenton Line. SEPTA later reduced the station name to simply Levittown.

In 1983, a new ownership company purchased the Levittown parking lot for $50 as part of a county sale. The parking lot was free since the station opened in 1956, became a paid lot on December 9. Levitt sold rights to the parking lot in 1956 and the ownership changed multiple times. The county attempted to sell it in 1982 and failed because of legal problems attached to the property. However, the new lot owner stated that he bought the land the train station stands on in 1983 along with the lot, a point that SEPTA disagreed with, stating that Amtrak owned the land. SEPTA stated that they would not spend the $500,000 requested for the rights to the parking lot and that since the fee was established on December 9, ridership at Levittown station shrunk, with ridership going to other stations for free parking.

=== Reconstruction (2013–2019) ===
SEPTA announced in December 2013 that the Levittown station would be rebuilt, replacing the 1953 station. This new project, costing $26 million, would including two new high-level side platforms, a new station depot, a pedestrian bridge with elevators to replace the old tunnel, and upgrades to the parking lots. SEPTA officials announced that bids would likely be released in 2014, but no timetable on when it would begin. In May 2014, SEPTA officials and Lieutenant Governor Jim Cawley held a press conference announcing that a new station would be a $24 million structure. They also stated that the project was delayed previously due to cuts to transportation funding and that a recent funding measure reinstated their efforts to replace the station. SEPTA's Board of Directors approved their capital budget for the year 2015–2016 in May 2015. The budget included $20.2 million for the upgrades at Levittown station.

While construction of the new station began in November 2015, further delays were caused by the borough of Tullytown. Tullytown charged SEPTA with over $250,000 in fees and legal requirements that they considered necessary after disagreeing with the project design. Tullytown requested that SEPTA revise the plans for the construction over safety concerns. However, the two sides were negotiating outside of court on a resolution to this, but that at a meeting in February 2016 failed to come to an agreement over the $36 million project. SEPTA argued in the United States District Court for the Eastern District of Pennsylvania that the borough's actions could cause the project to be delayed well past acceptable timelines and filed an injunction to stop them from continuing to hinder the project. The two sides reached an agreement on April 7, 2016. SEPTA would pay Tullytown $34,031 in fees and the borough would release any claims on the project.

The beginning of the project eliminated the fieldstone ticket office built by Levitt, save for a few pieces that would be displayed at the new station. The demolition occurred by contractors with Thomas P. Carney, Inc. on June 10, 2016. The second phase of the project would involve the construction of the platforms, pedestrian overpass and new station depot. The new parking lot would fit 470 parking spaces for cars. The second phase began in the summer of 2017. The final phase included extending the new platforms, the north parking lot and finishing the depot and elevators. Efforts were also made to upgrade and reconfigure the entrance at Fallsington Avenue. The expectation by the end of 2017 was that the new station overpass would open in the Spring of 2018, during the construction of the third phase and the 1954 station tunnel would be closed. However, further delays interrupted the Levittown station projects and by June 2018, the project would not be finished until the Winter of 2019. The 1954 tunnel closed for good in October 2018. Amtrak workers on site stated that most likely the tunnel would be sealed and not filled. Construction of the station finished in the Autumn of 2018. A ribbon cutting ceremony was held on October 3, 2019 for the new station, including SEPTA officials, Tullytown officials and other local politicians.

=== Recent history (2019–present) ===
SEPTA announced in August 2024 that they would reinstate parking fees at several stations along their system. The fees, $2/day on weekdays and free on weekends and holidays, would be to help pay for lot maintenance while the agency dealt with a funding crisis. SEPTA approved a contract with Flowbird America, Inc. for $12.3 million that would help with the operation of the new fees. Levittown and Bristol stations would be the final two stations to get the fees, occurring on November 4, 2024.
