= Sisters of the Blessed Sacrament =

Catholic order of religious sisters in the United States

- Abbreviation: S.B.S. (post-nominal letters)
- Formation: February 12, 1891; 135 years ago
- Founders: St Katharine Drexel
- Headquarters: 4 Interplex Dr, Ste 205; Trevose, PA 19053
- Region served: African-American and Native American communities
- Patronage: Blessed Sacrament
- Parent organization: Catholic Church
- Website: https://www.katharinedrexel.org/sisters-of-the-blessed-sacrament/

The Sisters of the Blessed Sacrament (SBS) are a Catholic order of religious sisters in the United States. They were founded in 1891 by Katharine Drexel as the Sisters of the Blessed Sacrament for Indians and Colored People.

During her life, Saint Katharine used approximately $20 million of her personal fortune to fund SBS-staffed schools for Native Americans and African Americans; her wealth passed on to other charitable organizations following her death, due to a clause in her father's will. The sisters continue to work in schools and churches in the Black and indigenous communities of the United States.

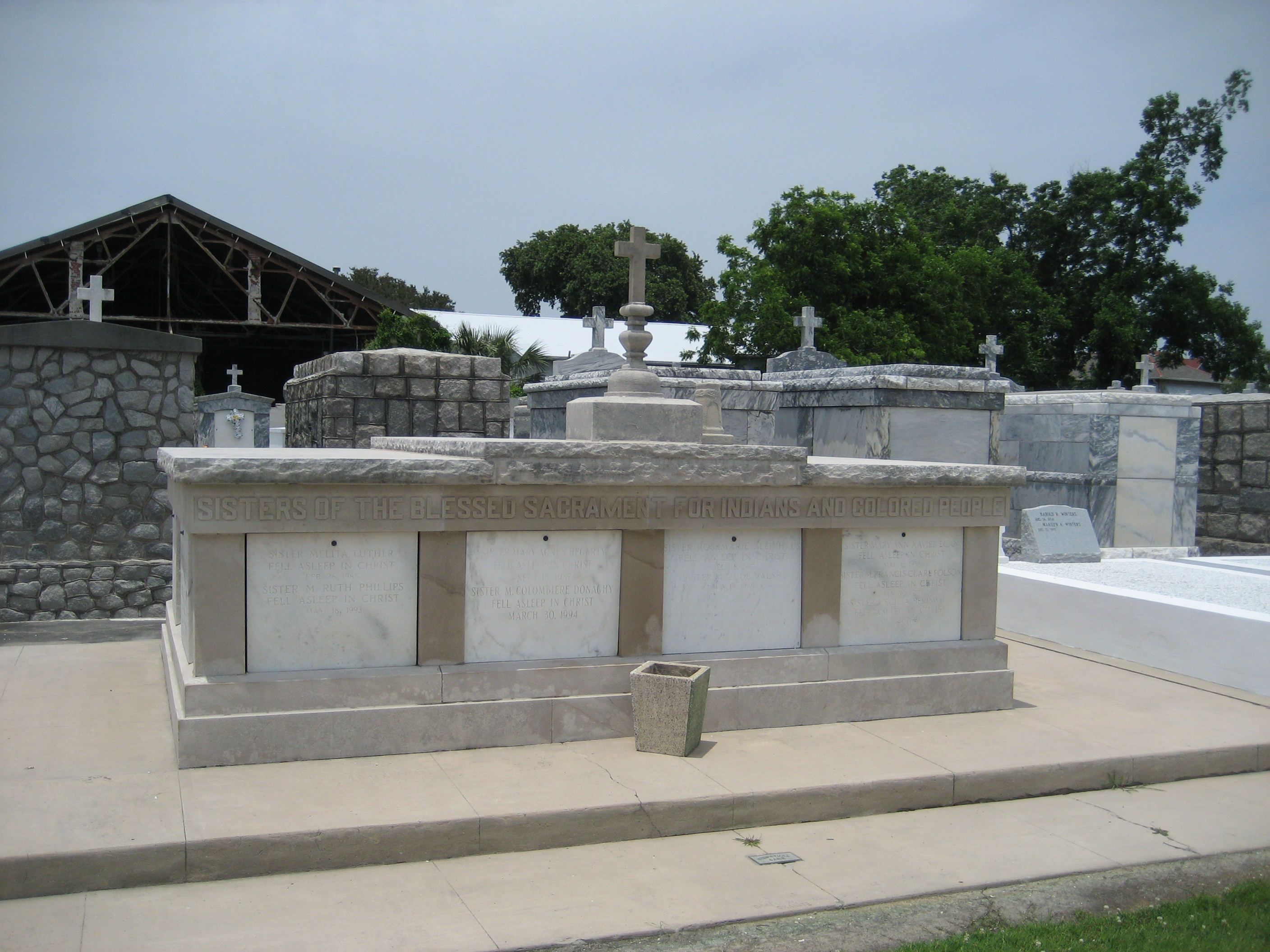
Crypt for "Sisters of the Blessed Sacrament for Indians and Colored People" in Saint Louis Cemetery #3, New Orleans.

== History ==
=== Background ===
The Third Plenary Council of Baltimore (1884), a meeting of all Catholic bishops in the United States, renewed the vigor for missionary work among the "Colored and Indian races". Katharine Drexel and her sisters were some of the many who took up the call, using their vast wealth inherited from their father, Francis Anthony Drexel, to finance schools and missions for African- and Native-American children. (They received monthly dividends from his multifaceted investments.)

She and her sisters would eventually travel to Rome to ask Pope Pope Leo XIII for missionaries to staff the institutions they were funding, but the Pope instead asked her to become a missionary herself. She eventually obliged, shocking her family, high society, and the world.

=== Founding ===
Archbishop James O'Connor of Omaha, acting alongside Drexel, decided, with the approval of Archbishop P. J. Ryan of Philadelphia, to form a new congregation on behalf of Native Americans and African Americans. For some years previous to this step, Drexel had been very active in re-establishing and supporting schools in many of the Indian reservations.

The first sisters, including foundress Katharine Drexel, entered religious life under the tutelage of the Sisters of Mercy in Pittsburgh, Pennsylvania. They were also inspired by O'Connor, who served as Drexel's spiritual director until his death. In 1889, after completing a two-year novitiate to learn the foundations of religious life and upon first profession of vows, these sisters were clothed in the habit of the new congregation of the Sisters of the Blessed Sacrament of the Indians and Colored People. Drexel was installed as their first superior.

The order was headquartered at their longtime motherhouse, St. Elizabeth's Convent in Cornwells Heights, Pennsylvania.

After this, they continued their period of preparation in the old Drexel homestead, in Torresdale, Philadelphia. Early in 1892 a mother-house and novitiate were opened at Cornwells Heights, Pennsylvania, adjoining which was erected a manual training and boarding school for African-American boys and girls. In June 1894, four sisters set out for Santa Fe, New Mexico to reopen St. Catherine Indian School.

=== Major works ===
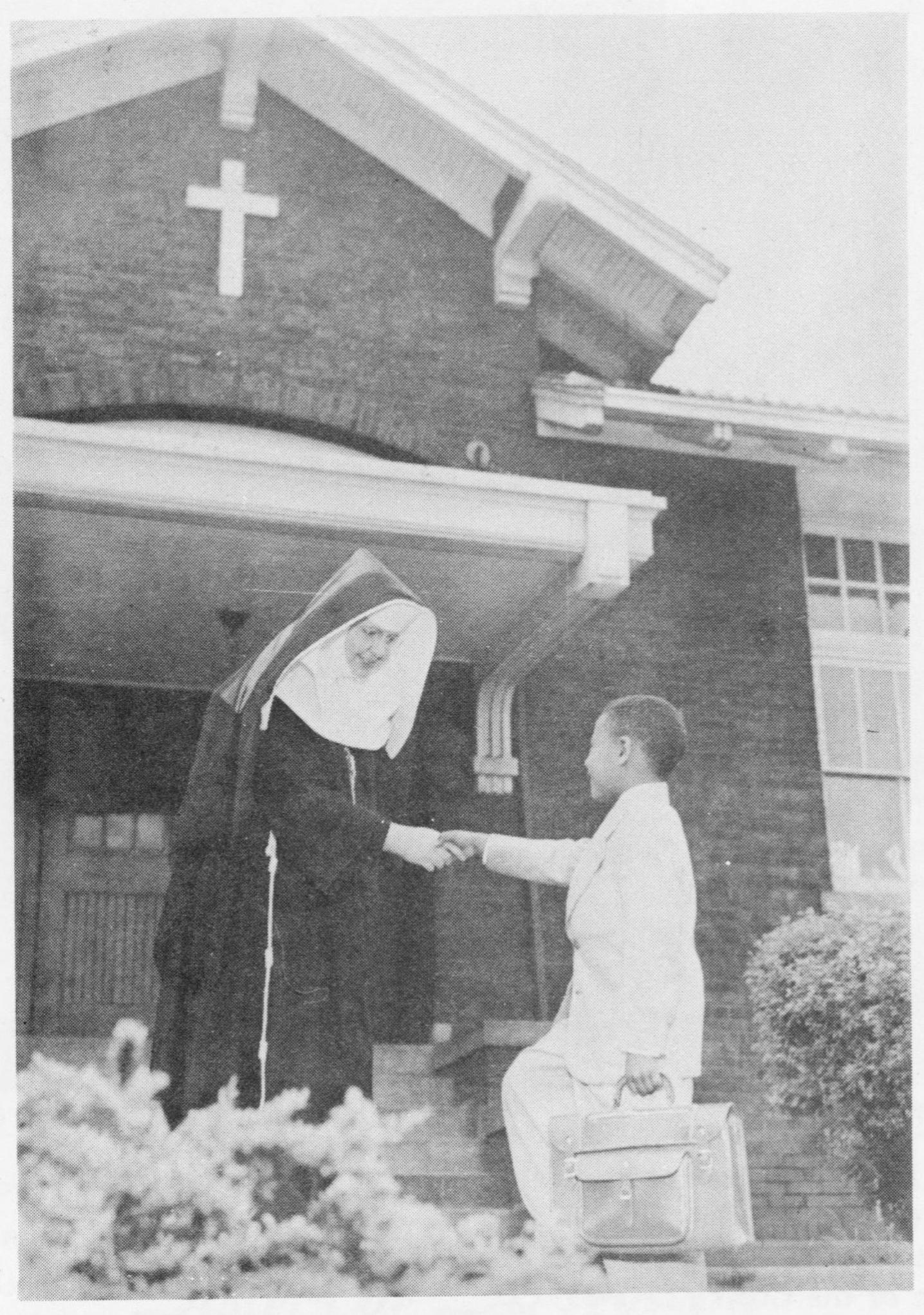
A Sister of the Blessed Sacrament greets a Black schoolboy at Saint Cyprian Church in Columbus, Ohio.

In 1915, Drexel founded Xavier University of Louisiana in New Orleans, initially a high school (accredited in 1921) that became a university in 1925. It remains the only Catholic HBCU and was staffed in part by the SBS sisters until 2024.

The sisters have collaborated with the Bureau of Catholic Indian Missions, the Commission for the Catholic Missions among the Colored People and the Indians and other Catholic institutions.

=== Death of Mother Katharine and canonization ===
Drexel died in 1955, and at the time the order had over 500 members. Because her father's will stated that his daughters' inheritance should go to their children—or else to his other chosen charitable causes—upon their deaths, the SBS sisters no longer had a stream of income after Mother Katharine's death. (The SBS sisters were not on her father's list of recipients, having been founded well after his death.)

Drexel was canonized in the year 2000. The motherhouse was then made up of the motherhouse of retired nuns and the location of Saint Katharine Drexel Mission Center and National Shrine. It was listed on the National Register of Historic Places in 1978.

=== 21st century ===
Drexel's shrine remains active and is now managed by the Archdiocese of Philadelphia, who moved it to the Cathedral Basilica of Saints Peter and Paul in 2016. In 2017, due to a lack of members and money, the sisters moved out of St. Elizabeth's Convent and sold the property.

As of 2018, there were about 100 Sisters of the Blessed Sacrament, more than half of whom are retired. They continue to work in schools and churches around the country, with the last faculty member from the Sisters of the Blessed Sacrament working on the Xavier University of Louisiana campus passing in 2024.

== Schools ==
=== Universities ===
- Xavier University of Louisiana

=== Primary and secondary schools ===
- St. Joseph Indian Normal School
- St. Michael Indian School
