= Bristol station (SEPTA) =

Railway station in Bristol, Pennsylvania, United States

Bristol
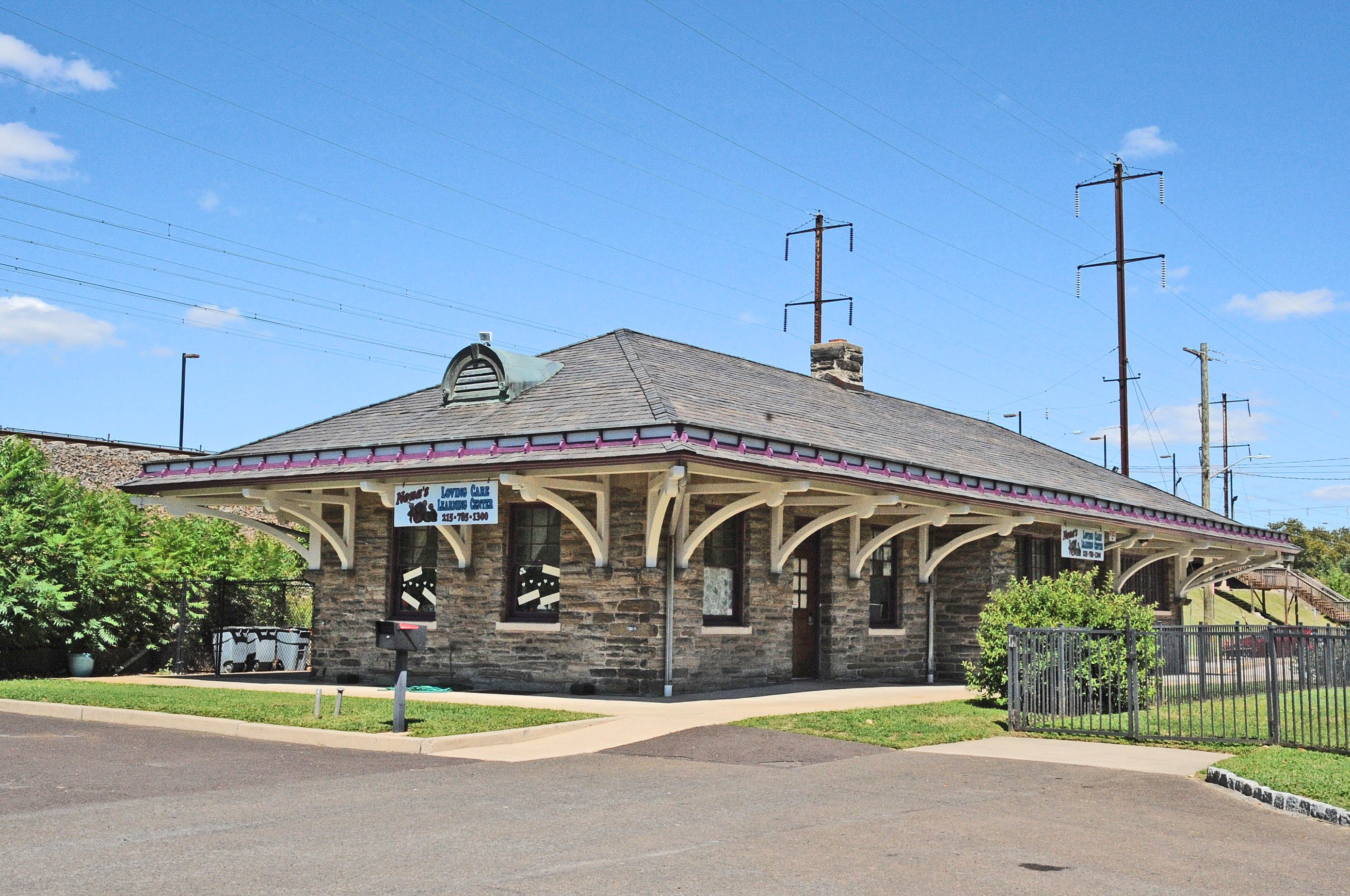
- Station in 2025

General information
- Location: 790 Washington Street; Bristol, Pennsylvania
- Coordinates: 40°06′18″N 74°51′17″W
- Owner: Southeastern Pennsylvania Transportation Authority
- Line: Amtrak Northeast Corridor
- Platforms: 2 side platforms
- Tracks: 4
- Connections: SEPTA Suburban Bus: 129; TMA Bucks: Bristol Rushbus

Construction
- Parking: 294 spaces
- Cycle facilities: 12 rack spaces
- Accessible: No

Other information
- Fare zone: 4

History
- Opened: 1911
- Electrified: 1930

Passengers
- 2017: 375 boardings, 384 alightings (weekday average)
- Rank: 71 of 146

Services
Preceding station	SEPTA	Following station
Croydon toward Temple University	Trenton Line	Levittown toward Trenton
Former services
Preceding station	Pennsylvania Railroad	Following station
Cornwells Heights toward Chicago	Main Line	Morrisville toward New York or Exchange Place
Croydon toward Suburban Station	Trenton Line	Edgely toward Trenton
Location

Bristol station is a SEPTA Regional Rail station in Bristol, Pennsylvania. It is located at Beaver and Garden Streets, and serves the Trenton Line. It was built in 1911 by the Pennsylvania Railroad as a replacement for an earlier station on Pond and Market Streets. As with many Pennsylvania Railroad stations, the station became a Penn Central station once the New York Central and Pennsylvania Railroads merged in 1968. Amtrak took over intercity railroad service in 1971, but Penn Central continued to serve commuters between Philadelphia and Trenton. Conrail took over commuter service in 1976, and turned the Trenton Line over to SEPTA Regional Rail in 1983. The station building was listed on the National Register of Historic Places in 2025.

The station is in zone 4 on the SEPTA Trenton Line, on Amtrak's Northeast Corridor and at one time was an Amtrak station as well. In 2004, this station saw 277 boardings on an average weekday. Amtrak does not stop at this station.

== Incidents ==
Three members of a family were struck and killed near the station by an Amtrak train on April 3, 2025. The Bucks County coroner ruled that one of the victims died by suicide. No train passengers or crew were injured.

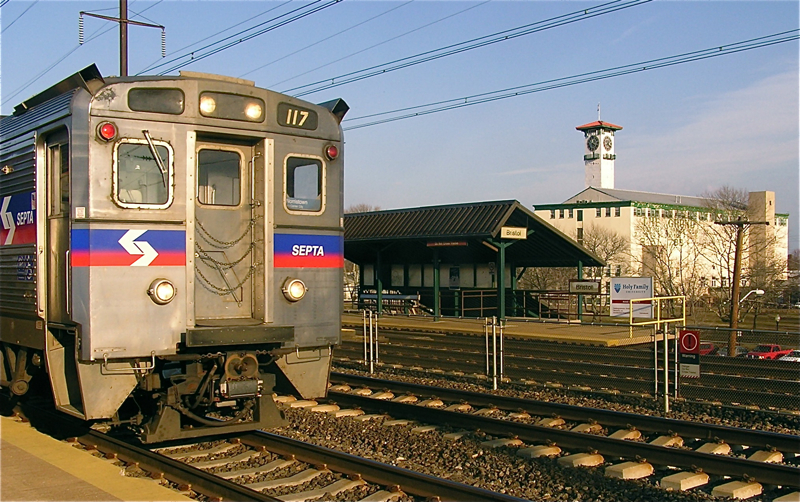
Train at Bristol station with the historic Grundy Mill Complex in the background

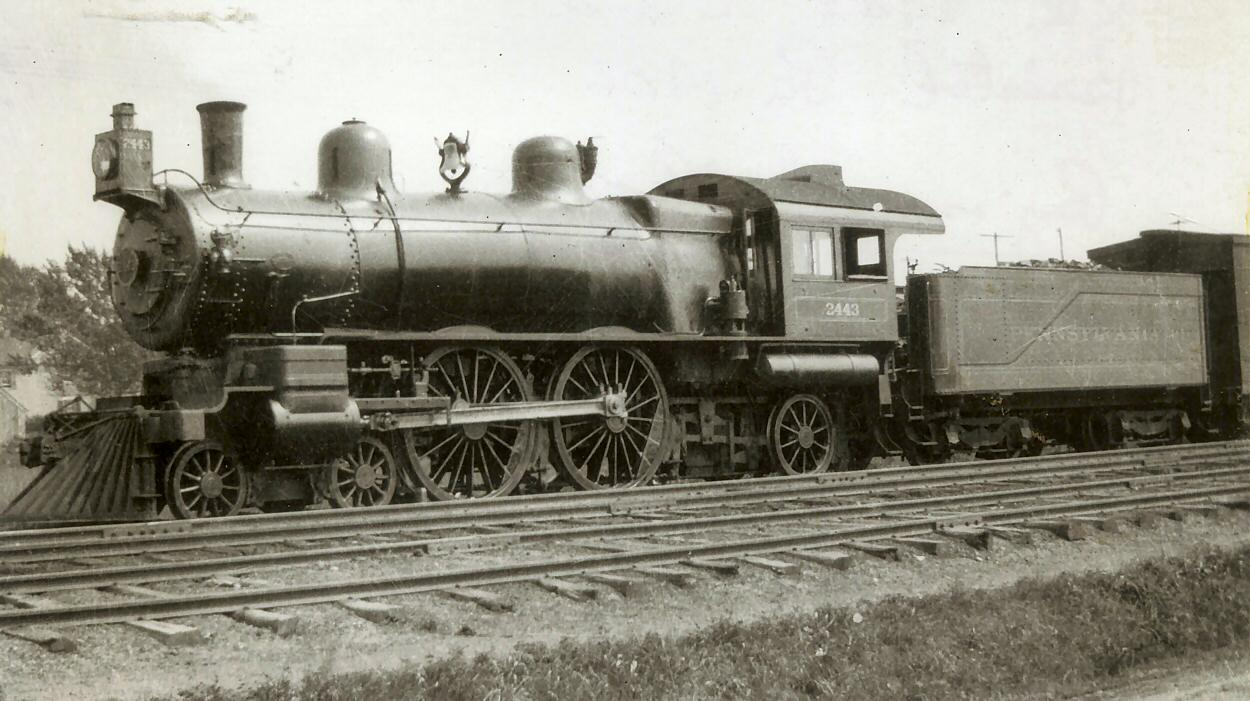
PRR E3a class 4-4-2 2443 in Bristol, PA circa 1906.
