= Eddington station =

Railway station in Bensalem, Pennsylvania

Eddington
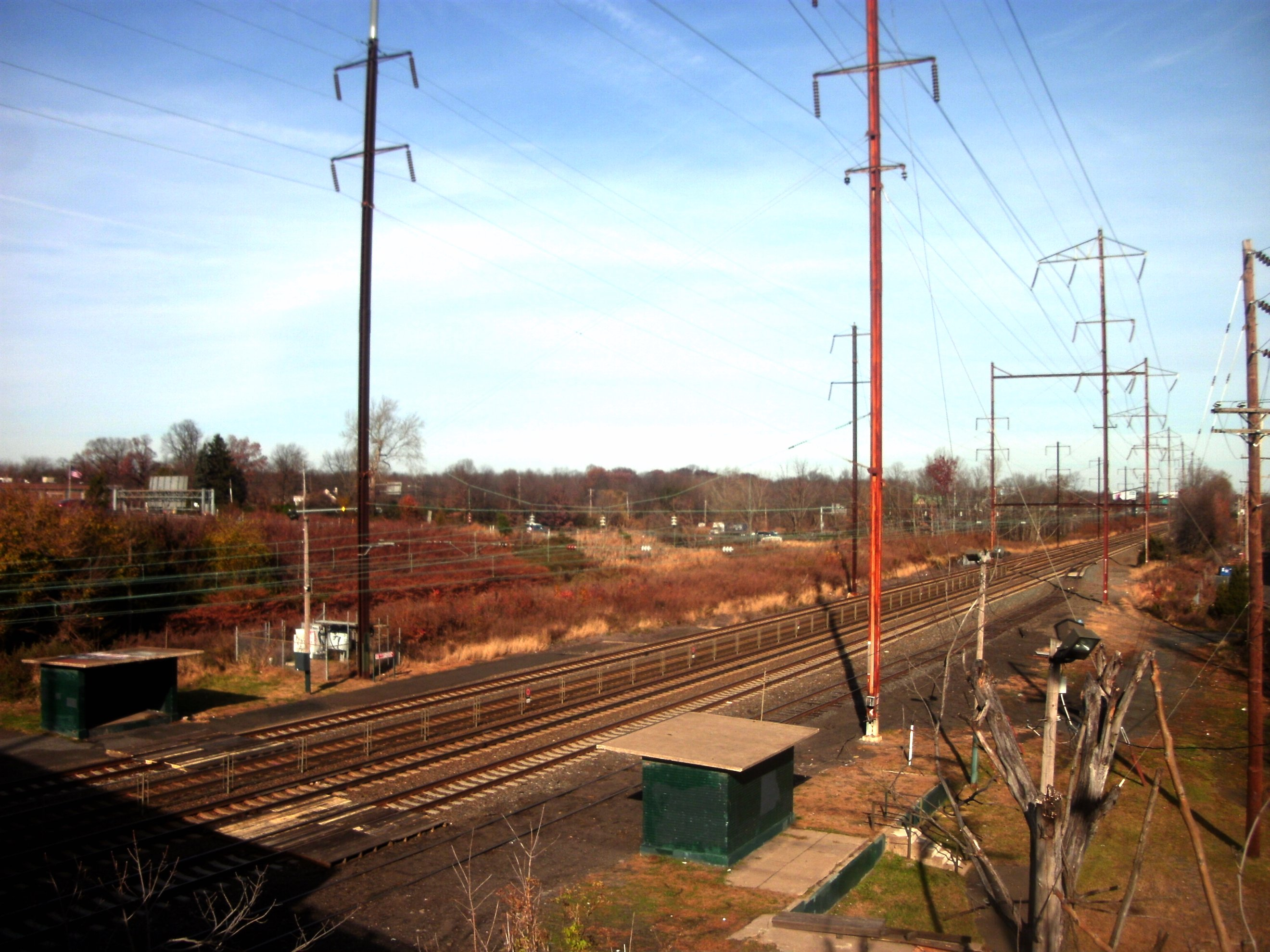
- Eddington station as seen from the bridge over the Northeast Corridor along Street Road. Interstate 95 is visible in the distance.

General information
- Location: 1099 Street Road (State Route 2007); Bensalem, Pennsylvania
- Coordinates: 40°04′58″N 74°56′02″W
- Owner: Southeastern Pennsylvania Transportation Authority
- Line: Amtrak Northeast Corridor
- Platforms: 2 side platforms
- Tracks: 5
- Connections: SEPTA Suburban Bus: 133

Construction
- Accessible: No

Other information
- Fare zone: 3

History
- Electrified: June 29, 1930

Key dates
- 1956: Station depot burned

Services
| Preceding station | SEPTA | Following station |
|---|---|---|
| Cornwells Heights toward Temple University | Trenton Line | Croydon toward Trenton |
Former services
| Preceding station | Pennsylvania Railroad | Following station |
|---|---|---|
| Cornwells Heights toward Suburban Station | Trenton Line | Croydon toward Trenton |
Location

Eddington is an active commuter railroad station in the Eddington section of Bensalem Township, Bucks County, Pennsylvania. Located on Street Road (State Route 2007) east of Interstate 95 exit 37, Eddington station serves as a flag stop on SEPTA's Trenton Line between Center City, Philadelphia and Trenton Transit Center in Trenton, New Jersey. Amtrak's Northeast Corridor services bypass the station. SEPTA Suburban Bus Route 133 from Morrell Park, Philadelphia terminates at Eddington station. Eddington station has two low-level side platforms with two staircases from Street Road. The station has no parking or ticket services.

Eddington station's depot burned on September 27, 1956 from by a suspected arson, causing damages estimated at over US$5,000 (equivalent to $59,211 in 2025).

== Station layout ==
There are no parking or services at the station, which consists of only two three-sided metal shelters. A walkway over the freight track allows passengers to board and alight Trenton-bound trains from the outer passenger service track.
