= Croydon station (SEPTA) =

Railway station in Bristol Township, Pennsylvania

Croydon
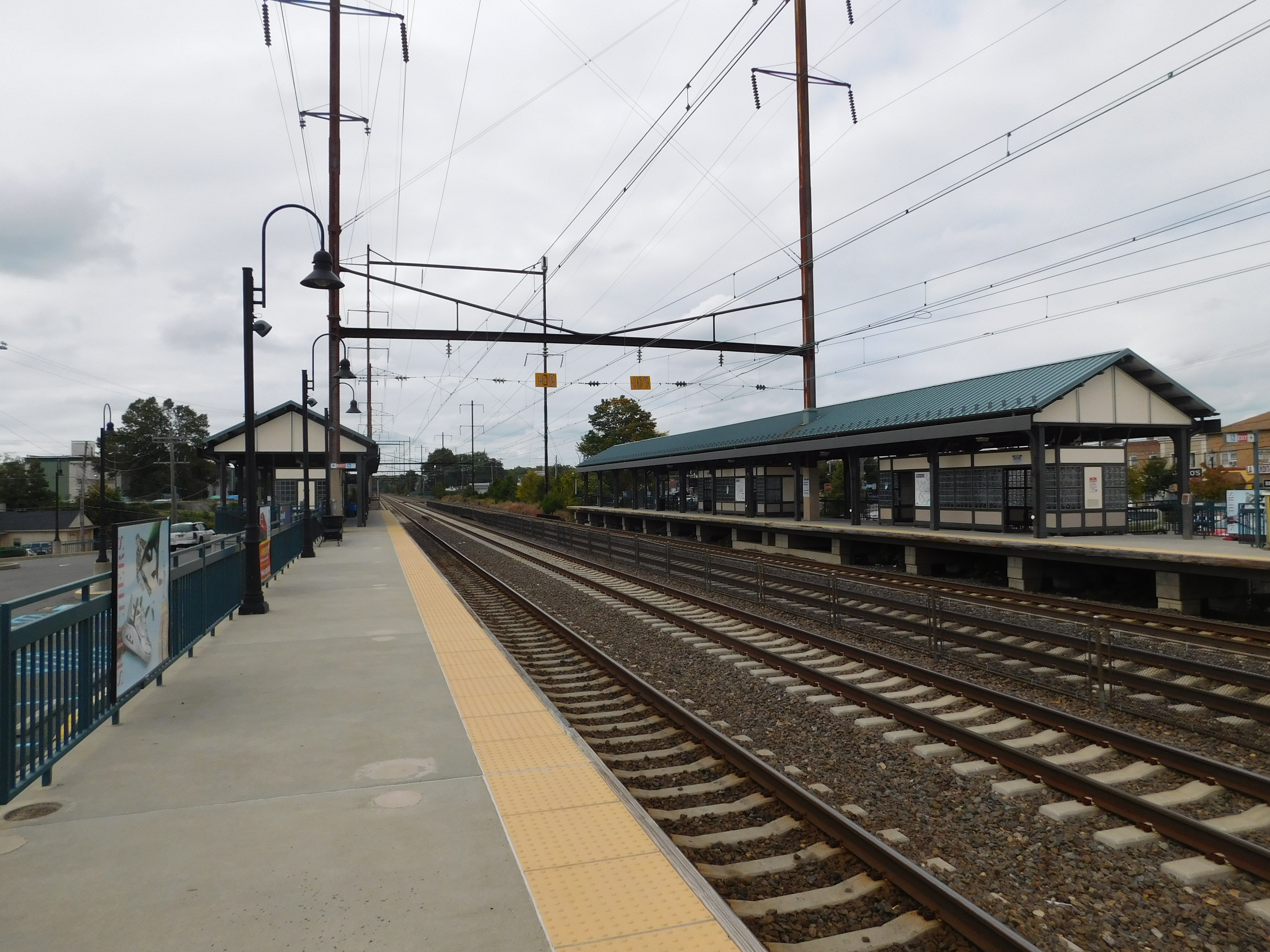
- Croydon station in September 2020, with the high-level platforms built in 2010–2011.

General information
- Location: 751 Bristol Pike; Croydon, Pennsylvania
- Coordinates: 40°05′37″N 74°54′25″W
- Owner: Southeastern Pennsylvania Transportation Authority
- Line: Amtrak Northeast Corridor
- Platforms: 2 side platforms
- Tracks: 4
- Connections: SEPTA Suburban Bus: 128

Construction
- Parking: 204 spaces
- Cycle facilities: 12 rack spaces
- Accessible: Yes

Other information
- Fare zone: 3

History
- Rebuilt: 2011
- Electrified: June 29, 1930

Passengers
- 2017: 486 boardings, 248 alightings (weekday average)
- Rank: 53 of 146

Services
Preceding station	SEPTA	Following station
Eddington toward Temple University	Trenton Line	Bristol toward Trenton
Former services
Preceding station	Pennsylvania Railroad	Following station
Eddington toward Suburban Station	Trenton Line	Bristol toward Trenton
Location

Croydon station is a SEPTA Regional Rail station in Croydon, Pennsylvania. Located at Bristol Pike and Cedar Avenue, it serves the Trenton Line. The station is located along the Northeast Corridor, owned by Amtrak. It is 19.9 miles (32.0 km) from 30th Street Station. Amtrak does not stop at this station.

In 2004, it saw 293 boardings on an average weekday. It was scheduled for renovation in Spring 2009, including an expanded parking lot, covered windscreen shelters, new lighting and raised platforms. Talks of a "super station" were active in 2007–2008 but have not been revisited. Despite the failed proposal to convert Croydon into a super station, Croydon recently underwent a complete upgrade due to infrastructure funding under the recovery act. The two green shelters have been torn down, new raised accessible platforms have been added, new parking lots have been paved, new lighting has been erected, and a new underpass walkway has been added. The station was completed in the fall of 2011, with a ribbon-cutting ceremony held on October 28.
