= Eddington, Pennsylvania =

Unincorporated community in Pennsylvania, US

- Census-designated place
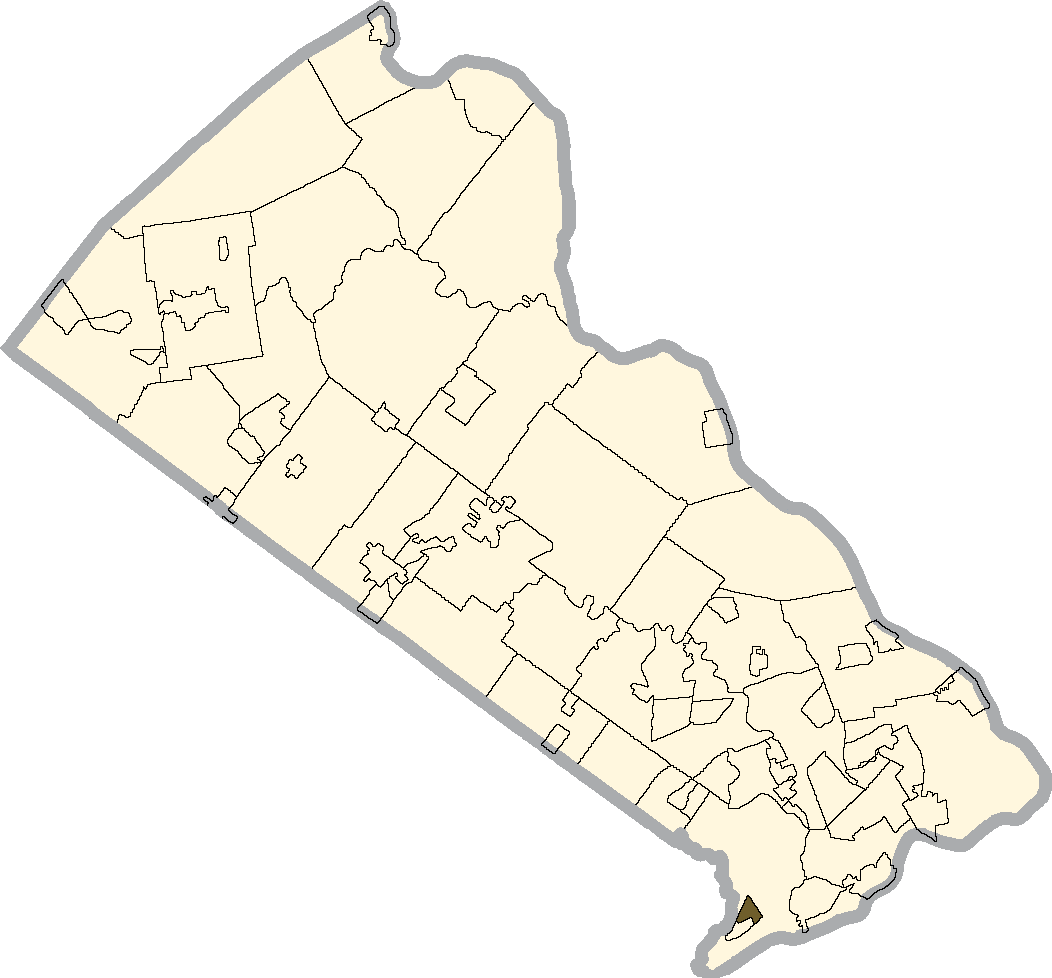
- Location of Eddington within Bucks County

- Location of Eddington within Pennsylvania Eddington (the United States)
- Coordinates: 40°05′04″N 74°56′42″W
- Country: United States
- State: Pennsylvania
- County: Bucks
- Township: Bensalem

Area
  - Total: 0.55 sq mi (1.43 km^{2})
  - Land: 0.55 sq mi (1.43 km^{2})
  - Water: 0 sq mi (0.00 km^{2})
- Elevation: 66 ft (20 m)

Population (2020)
  - Total: 1,996
  - Density: 3,608.3/sq mi (1,393.19/km^{2})
- Time zone: UTC-5 (Eastern (EST))
  - Summer (DST): UTC-4 (EDT)
- ZIP code: 19020
- Area codes: 215, 267 and 445
- GNIS feature ID: 1173981

Eddington is a census-designated place located in Bucks County, Pennsylvania, United States. The community was part of Cornwells Heights-Eddington, which was split into two separate CDPs. As of the 2010 census, the population was 1,906. The community is served by the Eddington station along SEPTA Regional Rail's Trenton Line.

== Demographics ==
Historical population
Census	Pop.	Note	%±
2020	1,996		—
U.S. Decennial Census

== See also ==
- Bensalem Township
