= St. Elizabeth's Convent =

Historic church in Pennsylvania, United States

- U.S. National Register of Historic Places
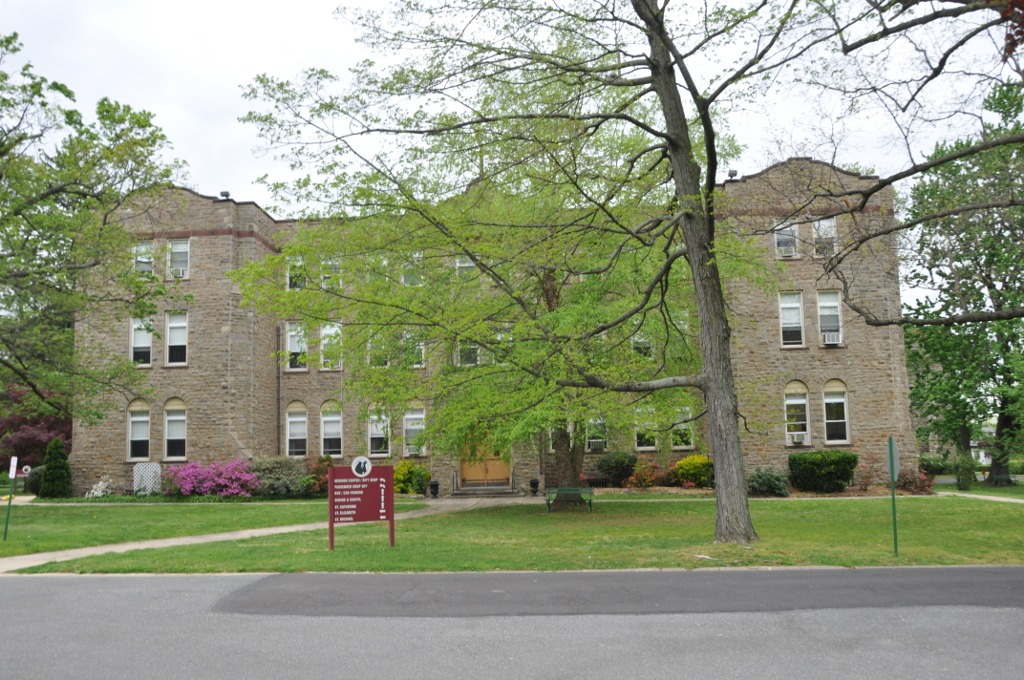
- Housing unit at the Katharine Drexel Shrine, April 2012

- Location within Pennsylvania Location within the United States
- Location: 1663 Bristol Pike, Cornwells Heights, Pennsylvania
- Coordinates: 40°4′23″N 74°57′26″W
- Area: 8 acres (3.2 ha)
- Built: 1892
- Architect: Burns, Charles; Et al.
- Architectural style: Spanish-French Mission
- NRHP reference No.: 78002352
- Added to NRHP: March 21, 1978

St. Elizabeth's Convent was a historic Roman Catholic convent located at 1663 Bristol Pike in Cornwells Heights, Bensalem Township, Bucks County, Pennsylvania. From 1892 to 2017 it served as the motherhouse of the Sisters of the Blessed Sacrament, founded by St. Katharine Drexel as the Sisters of the Blessed Sacrament for Indians and Colored People.

The complex was also home to the Saint Katharine Drexel Mission Center and National Shrine. Saint Katharine was entombed in a crypt in the chapel until the entire crypt was moved to the Cathedral Basilica of Saints Peter and Paul in Philadelphia and established as a new shrine.

== History ==
The complex was built in 1892, and consists of three contributing buildings. They are built in the Spanish-French Mission style. The main building is the convent, which has an attached chapel and bell tower. The other contributing buildings are the utility building and 2 1/2-story laundry building.

The site was listed on the National Register of Historic Places in 1978.

The convent was closed and sold in 2017, though the chapel was preserved as a place of worship. The Drexel shrine, however, was decommissioned and rebuilt at the Philadelphia cathedral thereafter.

== Gallery ==
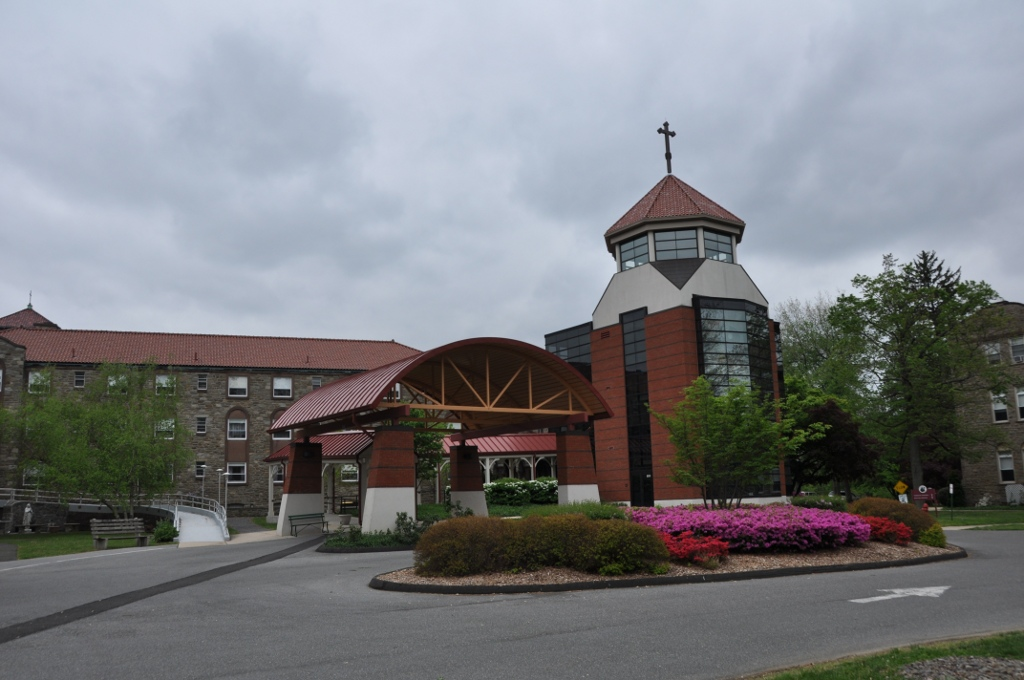
Entrance to the Katharine Drexel Shrine, April 2012
