= TMA Bucks =

- Headquarters: Trevose, Pennsylvania
- Service area: Bucks County, Pennsylvania
- Service type: Public Transit
- Fleet: Buses
- Fuel type: Compressed natural gas
- Chief executive: Stephen Noll (Executive Director)
- Website: http://www.tmabucks.com

TMA Bucks is a member-supported nonprofit organization and advocacy group that oversees transportation needs in Bucks County, Pennsylvania. The organization works to improve transportation through partnerships with businesses and government agencies, promoting travel management strategies to reduce congestion, providing a clearinghouse for transportation policies and programs, establishing community public transportation, providing a forum for improvements on transportation and infrastructure, representing members regarding transportation matters on Bucks County, and improving access to healthcare and social services throughout the county. TMA Bucks is made up of several members including businesses and government agencies throughout Bucks County. TMA Bucks, in partnership with Bucks County Transport, operates the Rushbus public transit service that connects employers in two parts of Bucks County to SEPTA train and bus service.

== Rushbus ==
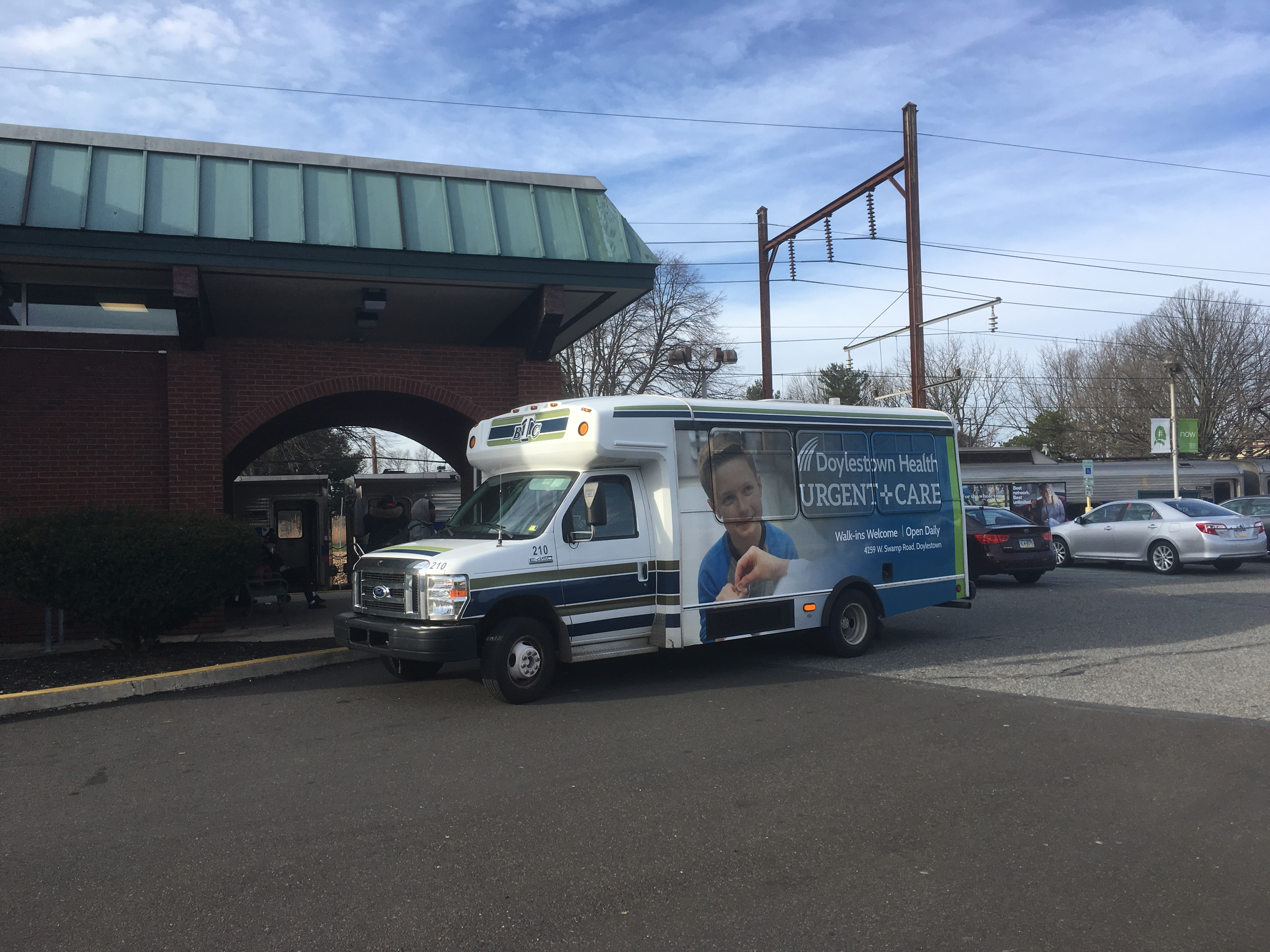
The Richboro-Warminster Rushbus at Warminster Station in Warminster

The Rushbus is a bus service operated as a partnership between TMA Bucks and Bucks County Transport, connecting employers to SEPTA train and bus service. Rushbus operates two routes Monday through Friday during rush hours:

- Bristol Rushbus - Operates from the Bristol station along SEPTA Regional Rail's Trenton Line and provides connections to employers in the borough of Bristol.
- Richboro-Warminster Rushbus - Operates from the Warminster station along SEPTA Regional Rail's Warminster Line and a connection with SEPTA's Route 22 bus and provides connections to employers in Warminster, Ivyland, Northampton Township, and Richboro.

The Rushbus fleet consists of buses powered with compressed natural gas. The base fare to ride the Rushbus is $1.00, with senior citizens age 65 and older free.
