= Trenton Line =

SEPTA Regional Rail service

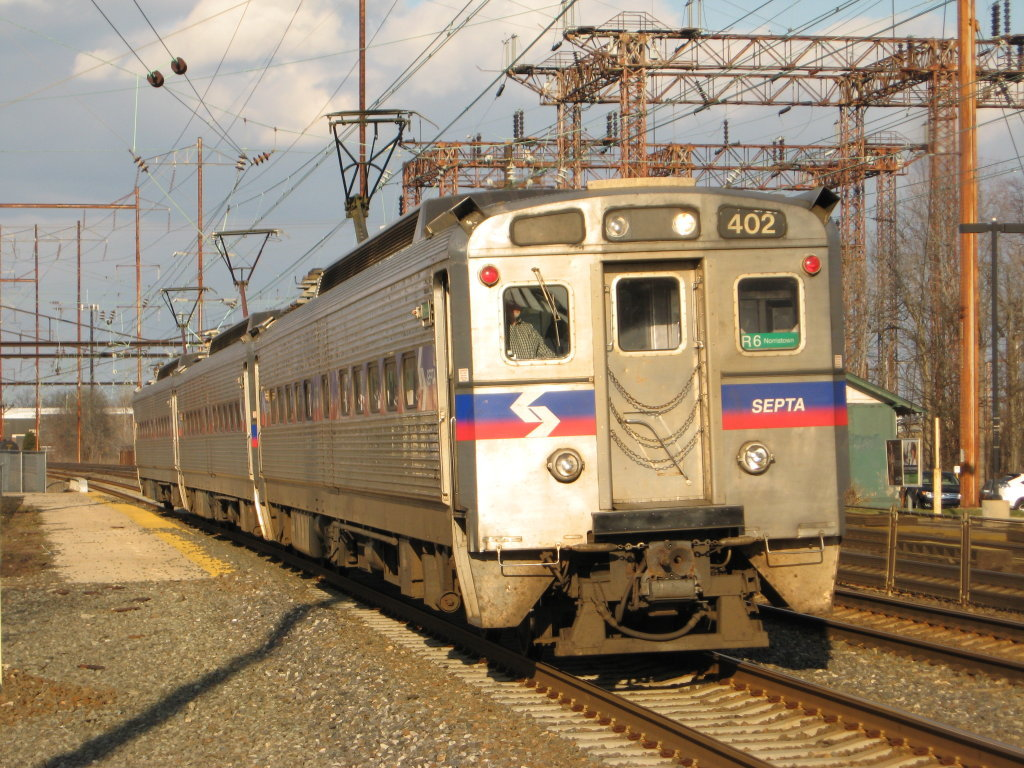
- Train #4656 pulls into the Cornwells Heights station.

Overview
- Status: Operating
- Termini: Trenton Transit Center; Temple University
- Stations: 15
- Website: septa.org

Service
- Type: Commuter rail
- System: SEPTA Regional Rail
- Operator: SEPTA
- Rolling stock: Silverliner electric multiple units, locomotive-hauled push–pull trains
- Daily ridership: 7,754 (FY 2025)

Technical
- Track gauge: 4 ft 8 1/2 in (1,435 mm) standard gauge
- Electrification: Overhead line, 12 kV 25 Hz AC

The Trenton Line is a route of the SEPTA Regional Rail (commuter rail) system. The route serves the northeastern suburbs of Philadelphia, Pennsylvania with service in Bucks County along the Delaware River to Trenton, New Jersey.

== Route ==
Trenton Line trains operate along Amtrak's Northeast Corridor from 30th Street Station via the Philadelphia Zoo (without stopping there), to North Philadelphia, before running parallel to I-95 and then US 13 for several miles. It crosses the Delaware River at Trenton, New Jersey before terminating at Trenton Transit Center, where connections can be made to New Jersey Transit's Northeast Corridor Line for continuing service to New York Penn Station.

The route is part of the middle leg of the Northeast Corridor; all 11 of Amtrak's Northeast Corridor services run along this line. The line's termini, 30th Street and Trenton Transit Center, have long been among the busiest Amtrak stations in the country. On weekdays, select Keystone Service trains also serve North Philadelphia and Cornwells Heights. Connecting Trenton Line service is listed in timetables for NJ Transit's Northeast Corridor Line, of which Trenton is the southern terminus.

== History ==

Electrified service between Philadelphia and Trenton began on June 29, 1930.

Between 1984–2010 the route was designated R7 Trenton as part of SEPTA's diametrical reorganization of its lines. Trenton Line trains operated through the city center to the Chestnut Hill East Line on the ex-Reading side of the system. The R-number naming system was dropped on July 25, 2010. As of 2026, most weekday Trenton Line trains terminate at Temple University, while some trains continue to other destinations. Most weekend trains terminate at Jefferson Station.

The Trenton Line usually has two push-pull electric-locomotive-hauled trains on the morning express runs and two on the evening express runs. Each train is usually made up of 6 coach trailers made by Bombardier with ACS-64 locomotives hauling them.

SEPTA activated positive train control on the Trenton Line on May 1, 2017.

== Stations ==
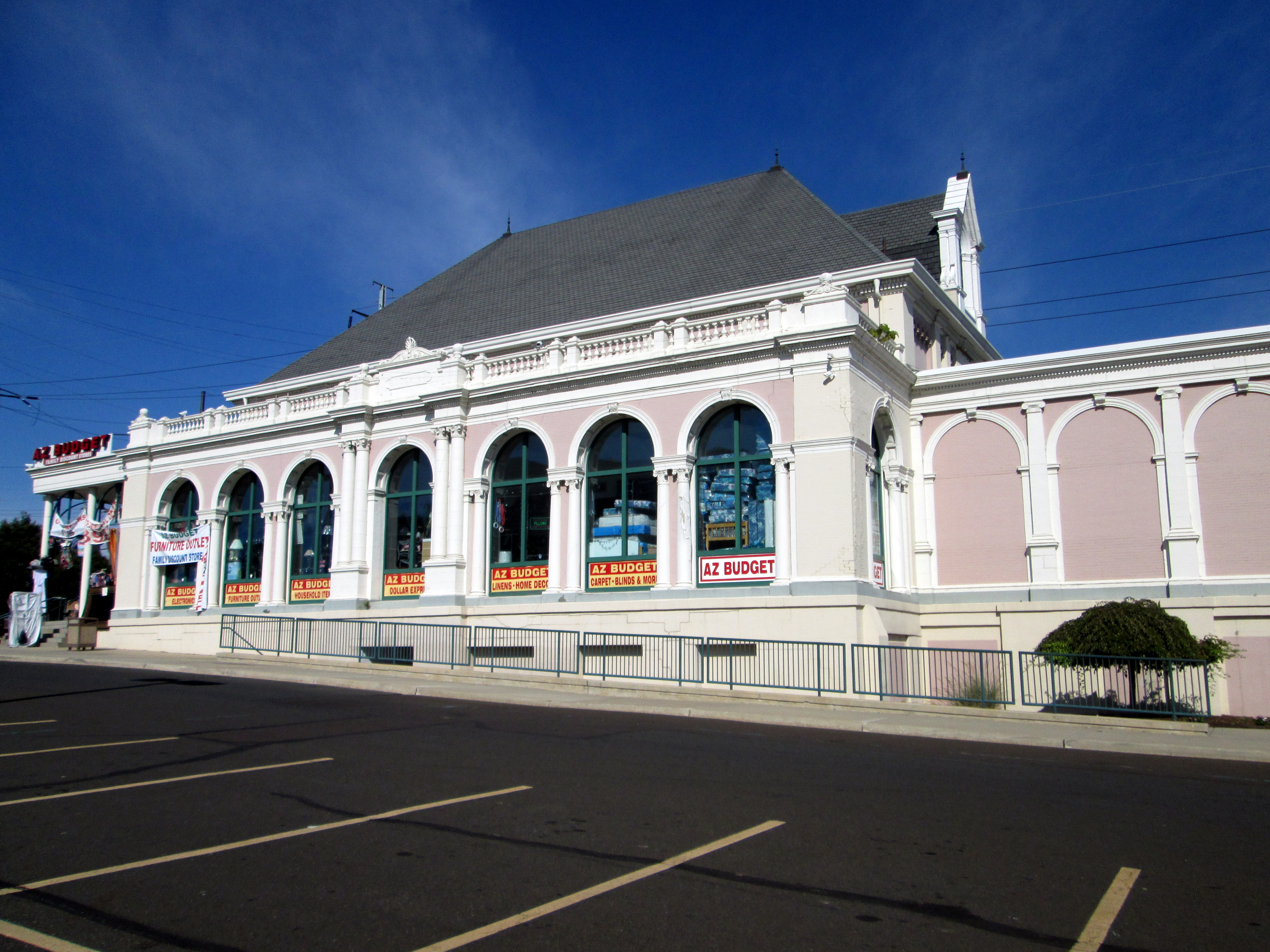
North Philadelphia station in 2013

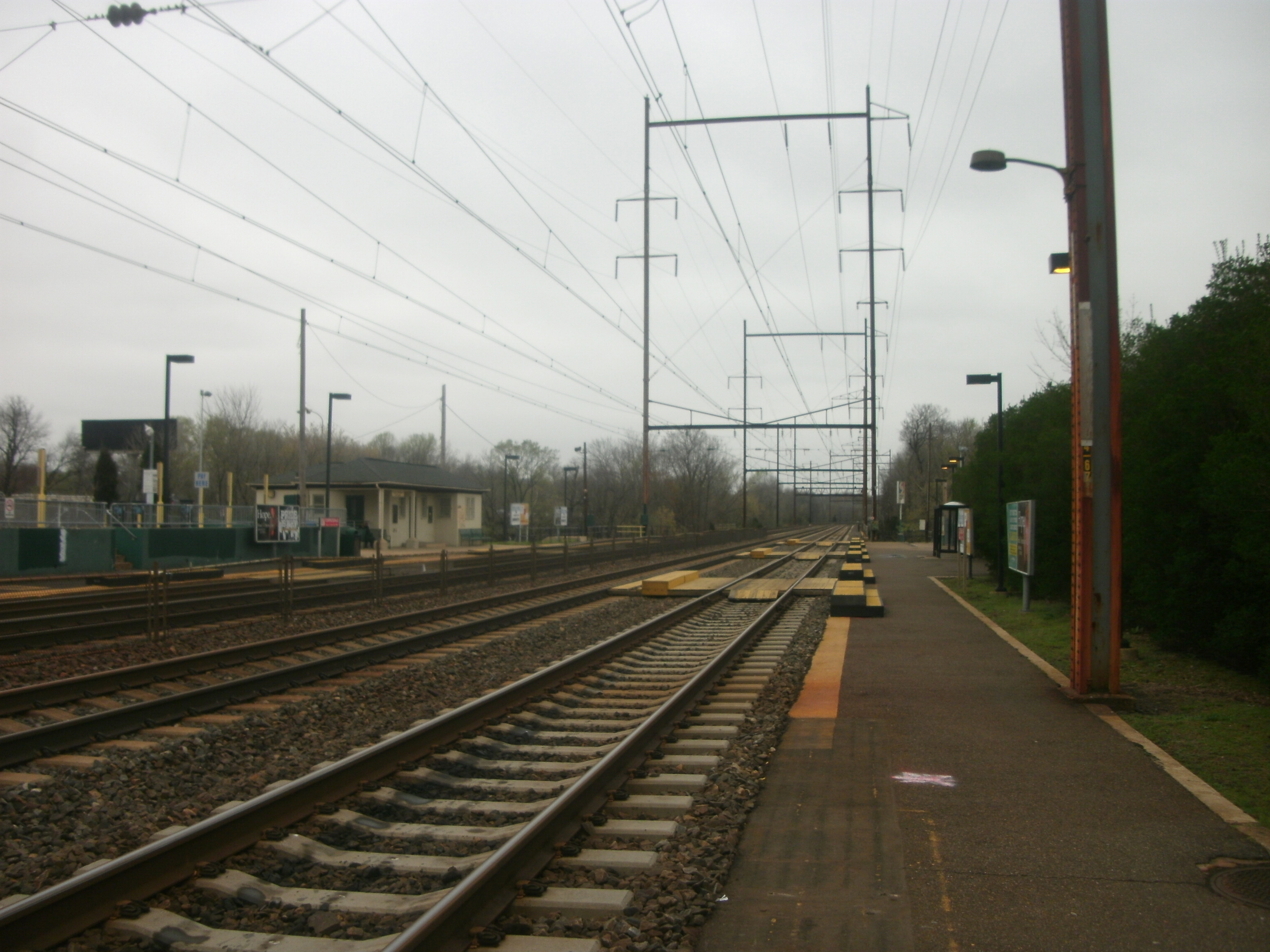
The utilitarian Torresdale station (seen in 2012) is typical of the Trenton Line

The Trenton Line includes the following stations north of the Center City Commuter Connection; stations indicated with gray background are closed. All stations within the Philadelphia city limits have a ticket office for purchasing ticket(s) to ride the Trenton line. Many stations outside the city limits have a ticket office as well, however they have shorter hours (most outside the city limits are closed on weekends) and fewer amenities than the ticket offices inside the stations within Philadelphia. Cornwells Heights station is considered a popular station on the route as it is the busiest SEPTA Regional Rail station outside of Center City, and serves Amtrak trains as well.

State	Zone	Location	Station	Miles (km) from Center City	Connections and notes
PA	C	Mantua, Philadelphia	Zoological Garden	1.9 (3.1)	Closed November 24, 1901
PA	C	Brewerytown, Philadelphia	Engleside	2.8 (4.5)	Discontinued April 5, 1903
PA	C	Strawberry Mansion, Philadelphia	Ridge Avenue	3.2 (5.1)	Discontinued April 5, 1903
PA	C	Strawberry Mansion, Philadelphia	22nd Street	3.9 (6.3)	
PA	1	Glenwood, Philadelphia	North Philadelphia	4.5 (7.2)	Amtrak: Keystone Service; SEPTA Regional Rail: Chestnut Hill West Line; SEPTA Metro: SEPTA City Bus: 4, 16
PA	1	Glenwood, Philadelphia	11th Street		
PA	1	Fairhill, Philadelphia	North Penn Junction		
PA	1	Harrowgate, Philadelphia	Harrowgate		
PA	1	Harrowgate, Philadelphia	Frankford Junction		Discontinued October 4, 1992
PA	1	Frankford, Philadelphia			
PA	1	Frankford, Philadelphia	Frankford		Closed 1990
PA	2	Frankford, Philadelphia	Bridesburg	9.3 (15.0)	SEPTA City Bus: 73
PA	2	Wissinoming, Philadelphia	Fitler		
PA	2	Wissinoming, Philadelphia	Wissinoming	10.1 (16.3)	Discontinued November 9, 2003
PA	2	Tacony, Philadelphia	Tacony	11.2 (18.0)	
PA	2	Holmesburg, Philadelphia	Holmesburg Junction	12.2 (19.6)	SEPTA City Bus: 84
PA	3	Holmesburg, Philadelphia	Liddonfield		
PA	3	Holmesburg, Philadelphia	Pierson's Station		
PA	3	Torresdale, Philadelphia	Torresdale	14.8 (23.8)	SEPTA City Bus: 19, 84
PA	3	Andalusia	Andalusia		Discontinued October 4, 1992
PA	3	Cornwells Heights	Cornwells Heights	16.9 (27.2)	Amtrak: Keystone Service; SEPTA Suburban Bus: 133
PA	3	Eddington	Eddington	18.2 (29.3)	SEPTA Suburban Bus: 133
PA	3	Croydon	Croydon	19.9 (32.0)	SEPTA Suburban Bus: 128
PA	4	Bristol	Bristol	22.7 (36.5)	SEPTA Suburban Bus: 129; TMA Bucks: Bristol Rushbus
PA	4	Levittown	Edgely		Closed in 1956; the railroad razed the depot at Edgely on January 16, 1957.
PA	4	Tullytown	Levittown	26.0 (41.8)	SEPTA Suburban Bus: 127, 128
PA	4	Tullytown	Tullytown		
PA	4	Morrisville	Morrisville		Closed October 25, 1969
NJ	NJ	Trenton	Trenton Transit Center	32.4 (52.1)	Amtrak: Cardinal, Carolinian, Crescent, Keystone Service, Northeast Regional, Palmetto, Pennsylvanian, Silver Meteor, Vermonter; NJ Transit Rail: Northeast Corridor Line, River Line; NJ Transit Bus: 409, 418, 600, 601, 604, 606, 608, 609, 611, 613, 619; SEPTA Suburban Bus: 127

== Ridership ==
Between FY 2013–FY 2019 yearly ridership on the Trenton Line ranged from 3.1–3.6 million before collapsing during the COVID-19 pandemic. (Note: Data for individual lines is not available for FY 2020.)
