= Cornwells Heights-Eddington, Pennsylvania =

Cornwells Heights-Eddington
- Former CDP
- Location of Cornwells Heights-Eddington in Pennsylvania Cornwells Heights-Eddington (the United States)
- Coordinates: 40°05′07″N 74°56′46″W
- Country: United States
- State: Pennsylvania
- County: Bucks
- Township: Bensalem

Area
  - Total: 1.0 sq mi (2.6 km^{2})
  - Land: 1.0 sq mi (2.6 km^{2})
  - Water: 0.0 sq mi (0 km^{2})
- Elevation: 79 ft (24 m)

Population (2000)
  - Total: 3,406
  - Density: 3,400/sq mi (1,300/km^{2})
- Time zone: UTC-5 (EST)
  - Summer (DST): UTC-4 (EDT)
- ZIP Code: 19020
- Area codes: 215, 267 and 445

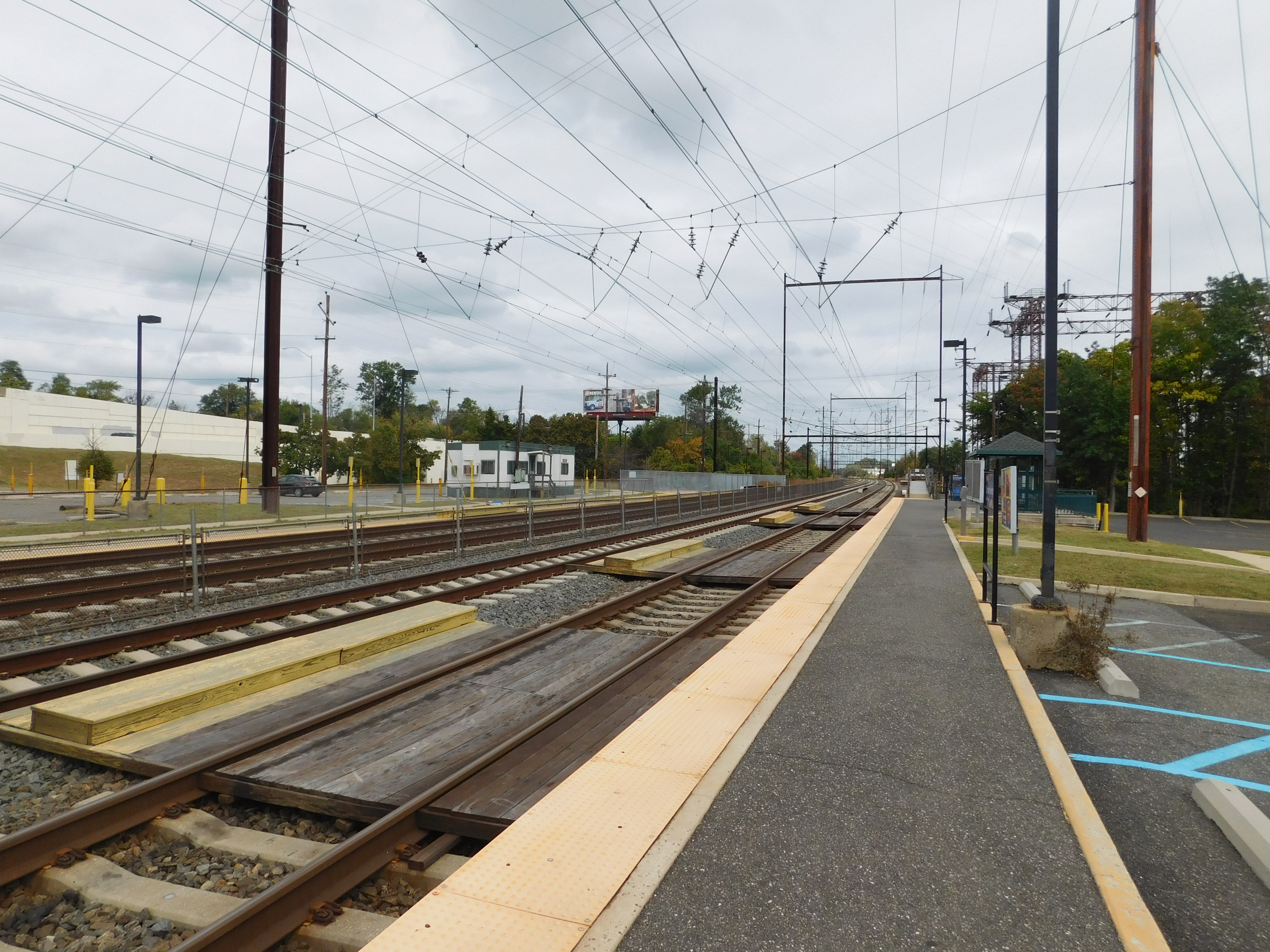
Cornwells Heights station of SEPTA's Trenton Line, 2020

Cornwells Heights-Eddington was a census-designated place (CDP) in Bucks County, Pennsylvania, United States. The population was 3,406 at the 2000 census. For the 2010 census, the area was split into two CDPs, Cornwells Heights and Eddington, that are adjacent unincorporated communities within Bensalem Township. Cornwells Heights is located a bit southwest of Eddington. Both communities use the Bensalem ZIP code, 19020.

The CDP was bounded on the south by the Delaware River, on the east by Street Road, on the north and west by Hulmeville Road, and on the west by Woodhaven Road. The Philadelphia city boundary is less than a mile to the west and north. Like neighboring Andalusia, the area consists of middle-class single-family homes along a series of grid-style streets. The main roads are generally accepted as Street Road, Hulmeville Road, Brown Avenue, Bristol Pike, and State Road.

== History ==
The Little Jerusalem AME Church, St. Elizabeth's Convent, and Trevose Manor are listed on the National Register of Historic Places.

== Geography ==
Cornwells Heights-Eddington was located at 40°5′7″N 74°56′46″W (40.085343, -74.946218).

According to the United States Census Bureau, the CDP had a total area of 1.0 square mile (2.6 km^{2}), all of it land.

== Demographics ==
Historical population
Census	Pop.	Note	%±
1990	3,621		—
2000	3,406		−5.9%

As of the census of 2000, there were 3,406 people, 1,193 households, and 888 families residing in the CDP. The population density was 3,332.5 inhabitants per square mile (1,286.7/km^{2}). There were 1,239 housing units at an average density of 1,212.3 per square mile (468.1/km^{2}). The racial makeup of the CDP was 96.80% White, 1.38% African American, 0.12% Native American, 1.09% Asian, 0.03% Pacific Islander, 0.18% from other races, and 0.41% from two or more races. Hispanic or Latino of any race were 1.53% of the population.

There were 1,193 households, out of which 29.8% had children under the age of 18 living with them, 59.4% were married couples living together, 10.2% had a female householder with no husband present, and 25.5% were non-families. 20.5% of all households were made up of individuals, and 9.5% had someone living alone who was 65 years of age or older. The average household size was 2.79 and the average family size was 3.19.

In the CDP, the population was spread out, with 22.9% under the age of 18, 7.4% from 18 to 24, 27.5% from 25 to 44, 25.2% from 45 to 64, and 17.0% who were 65 years of age or older. The median age was 40 years. For every 100 females, there were 96.4 males. For every 100 females age 18 and over, there were 94.2 males.

The median income for a household in the CDP was $49,728, and the median income for a family was $55,905. Males had a median income of $41,614 versus $32,107 for females. The per capita income for the CDP was $24,171. About 7.5% of families and 8.3% of the population were below the poverty line, including 11.3% of those under age 18 and 8.5% of those age 65 or over.
