= Little Jerusalem AME Church =

Historic site in Bucks County, Pennsylvania

- U.S. National Register of Historic Places
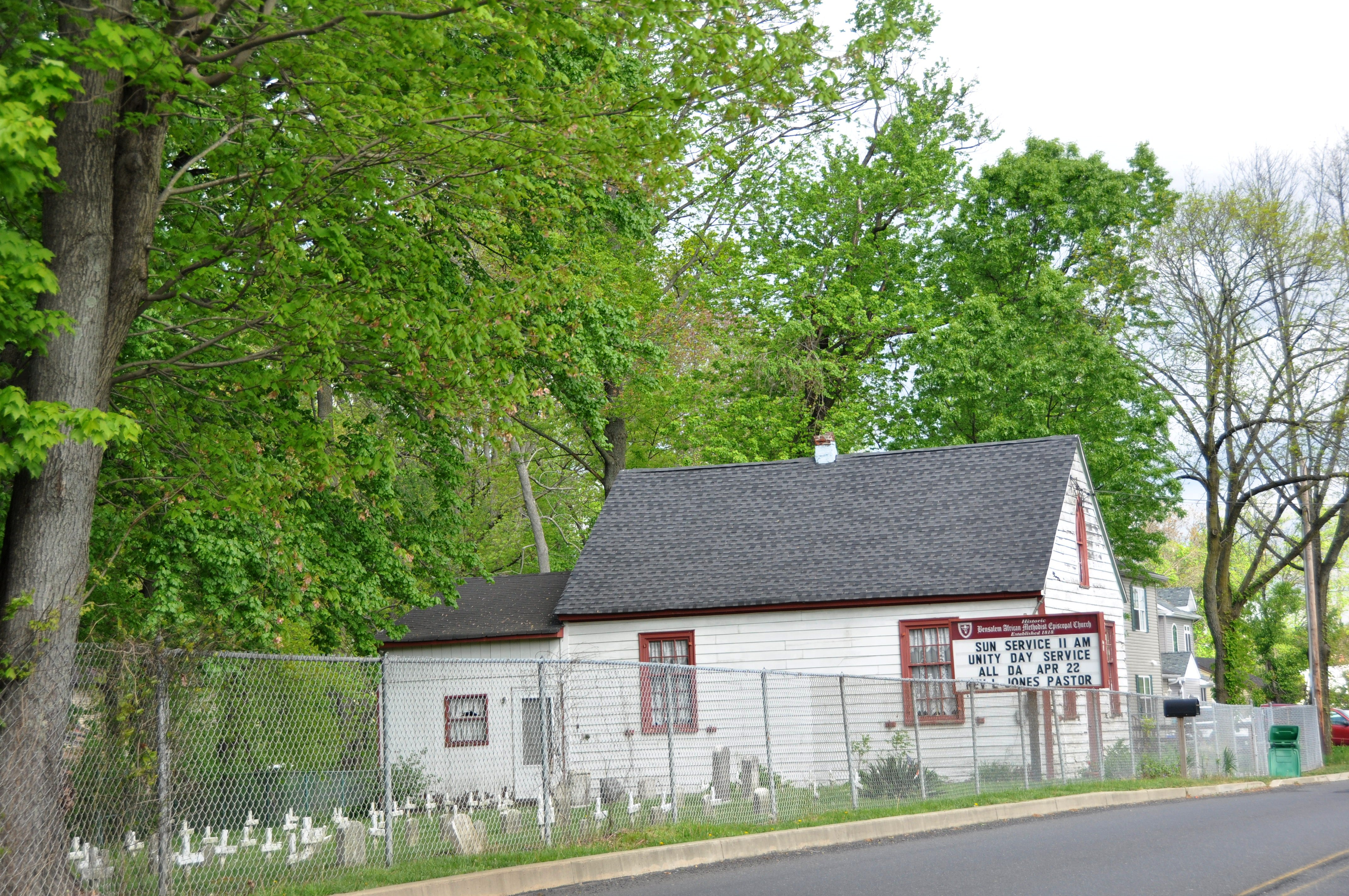
- Little Jerusalem AME Church, April 2012

- Location within Pennsylvania Location within the United States
- Location: 1200 Bridgewater Rd., Cornwells Heights, Pennsylvania
- Coordinates: 40°05′57″N 74°55′25″W
- Area: 0.5 acres (0.20 ha)
- Built: 1830
- NRHP reference No.: 80003429
- Added to NRHP: December 03, 1980

Little Jerusalem AME Church, also known as Bensalem AME Church, is a historic African Methodist Episcopal church located at 1200 Bridgewater Road in Cornwells Heights, Bensalem Township, Bucks County, Pennsylvania. It was built in 1830 and renovated about 1860 and 1896. It is a 1 1/2-story, one-room frame structure with a gable roof. The cemetery surrounding the church contains burials of black Civil War soldiers.

It is one of the oldest African American churches, having been established about 1820 by Rev. James Miller under the supervision of Richard Allen (1760–1831), founder of the AME Church. The pulpit of the church was built by Allen. The church served as a shelter in the Underground Railroad, helping those fleeing slavery. It was the only traditionally African-American church in Bensalem Township from 1830 until 1930. Under the pastorate of Reverend John Butler, a sabbath school was established in 1848 to teach local African Americans to read and write.

The site was listed on the National Register of Historic Places in 1980.
