= Cornwells Heights station =

Train station in Pennsylvania, US

Cornwells Heights
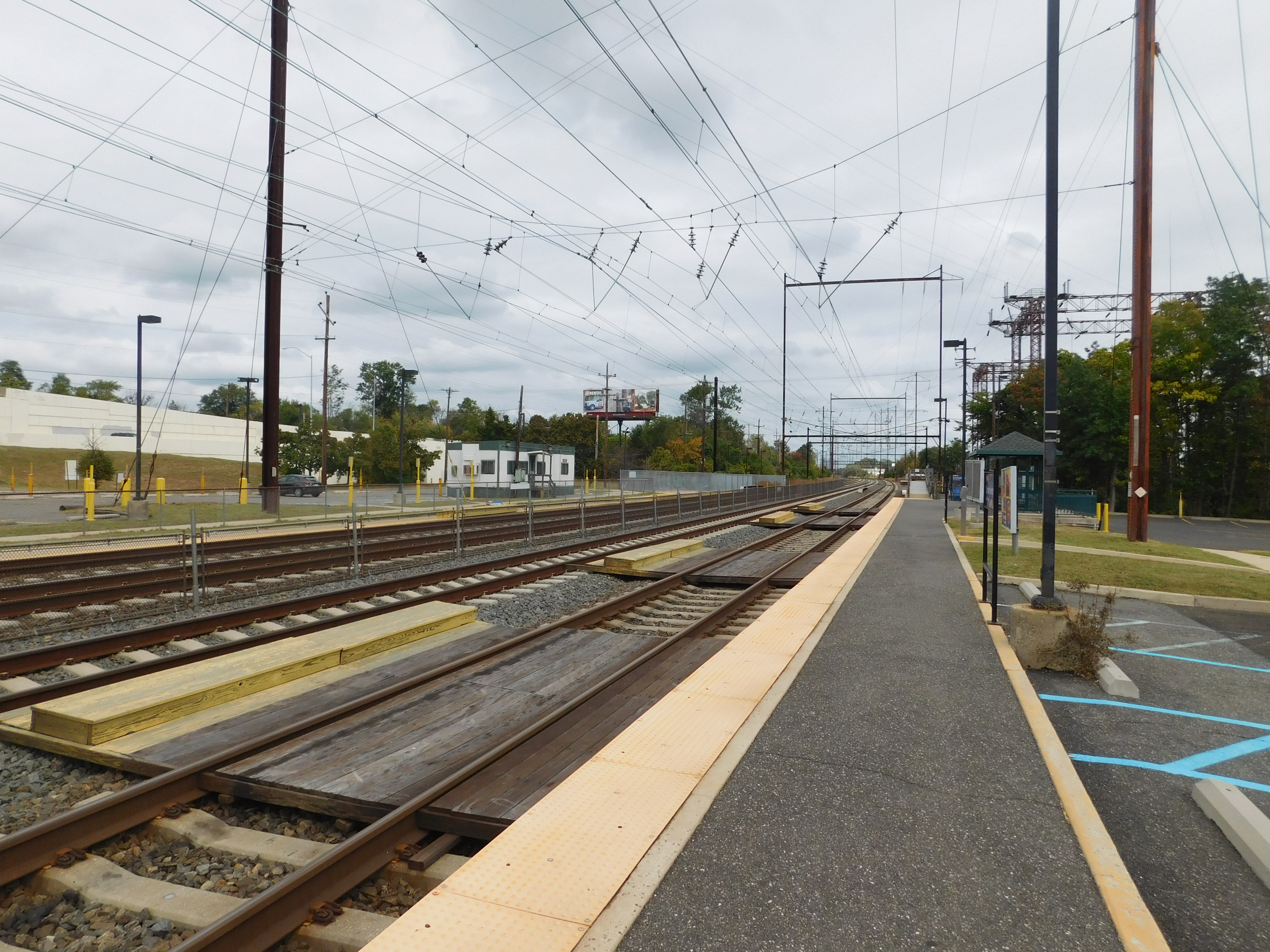
- Cornwells Heights station in September 2020, looking north

General information
- Location: 799 Station Avenue; Cornwells Heights, Pennsylvania
- Coordinates: 40°04′22″N 74°57′07″W
- Owner: Amtrak
- Operator: Southeastern Pennsylvania Transportation Authority
- Line: Amtrak Northeast Corridor
- Platforms: 2 side platforms
- Tracks: 4
- Connections: SEPTA Suburban Bus: 133

Construction
- Parking: 1861 spaces (315 SEPTA, 1546 non-SEPTA)
- Cycle facilities: 4 rack spaces
- Accessible: Yes

Other information
- Station code: Amtrak: CWH
- Fare zone: 3 (SEPTA)

History
- Electrified: June 29, 1930
- Former names: Cornwell's

Passengers
- FY 2025: 3,012 (Amtrak)
- 2017: 1,505 (weekday avg.) (SEPTA)
- Rank: 6 of 146

Services
Preceding station	Amtrak	Following station
North Philadelphia toward Harrisburg	Keystone Service limited service	Trenton toward New York
Preceding station	SEPTA	Following station
Torresdale toward Temple University	Trenton Line	Eddington toward Trenton
Former services
Preceding station	Pennsylvania Railroad	Following station
Torresdale toward Chicago	Main Line	Bristol toward New York or Exchange Place
Andalusia toward Suburban Station	Trenton Line	Eddington toward Trenton
Location

Cornwells Heights station is a commuter rail and inter-city rail station in the Cornwells Heights section of Bensalem Township, Bucks County, Pennsylvania. Located on Station Avenue, Cornwells Heights station serves all of SEPTA Regional Rail's Trenton Line trains between Center City, Philadelphia and Trenton Transit Center in Trenton, New Jersey. Amtrak has three Keystone Service trains between Harrisburg Transportation Center and New York Penn Station stop at Cornwells Heights on weekdays. Cornwells Heights a large parking lot of 1,861 spaces with a shuttle service operated to connect the two low-level side platforms. Cornwells Heights' inbound platform towards Philadelphia is also accessible via multiple ramps from Interstate 95 southbound and at the eastern end of State Route 63 (Woodhaven Road).

In 2017, Cornwells Heights saw 1,505 boardings on an average weekday, making it the busiest station outside of Center City. The station has a waiting room and a large park and ride facility, with direct access to and from Interstate 95 and Pennsylvania Route 63. The parking lot was built by PennDOT in anticipation of construction on I-95 and opened in 1997.

SEPTA was awarded $30.5 million in Infrastructure Investment and Jobs Act funds in November 2023 for reconstruction of the station. SEPTA will also contribute $12 million in matching funds and $13.1 in other federal funds, and Amtrak will contribute $244,000. The work will include 600-foot (180 m)-long accessible high-level platforms and a footbridge with elevators.
