= Trenton Transit Center =

Train station in Trenton, New Jersey

Trenton
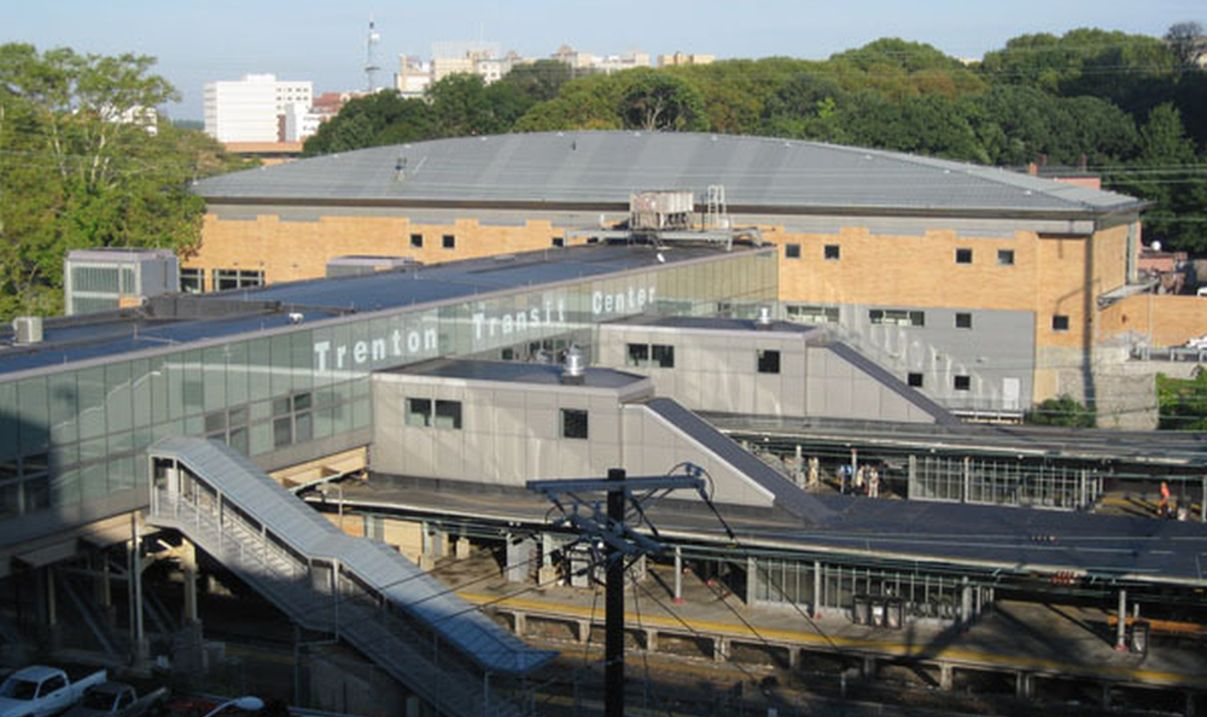
- Trenton Transit Center station in January 2013

General information
- Location: 72-83 South Clinton Avenue; Trenton, New Jersey; United States
- Coordinates: 40°13′8″N 74°45′15″W
- Owner: New Jersey Transit
- Lines: Northeast Corridor; Bordentown Branch
- Platforms: 2 island platforms, 1 side platform (Northeast Corridor); 2 side platforms (River Line)
- Tracks: 8
- Connections: NJ Transit Bus: 409, 418, 600, 601, 606, 608, 609, 611, 619, 624; SEPTA Suburban Bus: 127

Construction
- Parking: 3,450 spaces
- Cycle facilities: Available
- Accessible: Yes

Other information
- Station code: Amtrak: TRE
- IATA code: ZTN
- Fare zone: 22 (NJ Transit); NJ (SEPTA)

History
- Opened: April 20, 1863
- Rebuilt: 1893, 1976, 2008

Passengers
Amtrak
- FY 2025: 442,137 annually
NJ Transit
- 2025: 2,599 (average weekday)
- Rank: 13 of 153
River Line
- 2025: 990 (average weekday)
- Rank: 1 of 21
SEPTA
- 2017: 1,241 daily boardings
Services
Preceding station	Amtrak	Following station
Philadelphia toward Chicago	Cardinal	Newark Penn toward New York
Philadelphia toward Charlotte	Carolinian	Newark Penn toward New York
Philadelphia toward Miami	Silver Meteor	Newark Penn toward New York
Philadelphia toward New Orleans	Crescent	Metropark toward New York
Philadelphia toward Savannah	Palmetto	Metropark toward New York
Philadelphia toward Pittsburgh	Pennsylvanian	Metropark One-way operation
Cornwells Heights toward Harrisburg	Keystone Service	Princeton Junction toward New York
Philadelphia toward Norfolk, Newport News or Roanoke	Northeast Regional	Princeton Junction toward Boston South or Springfield
Philadelphia toward Washington, D.C.	Vermonter	Metropark weekends toward St. Albans
Acela does not stop here
Preceding station	NJ Transit	Following station
Terminus	Northeast Corridor Line	Hamilton toward New York
Hamilton Avenue toward Entertainment Center	River Line	Terminus
Preceding station	SEPTA	Following station
Levittown toward Temple University	Trenton Line	Terminus
Former services
Preceding station	Amtrak	Following station
Philadelphia toward Washington, D.C.	Acela Until 2023	Metropark toward Boston South
Philadelphia toward Washington, D.C.	Metroliner	Newark Penn toward New York
Philadelphia toward Washington, D.C.	Metroliner	Metropark Until 2005 toward New York
Philadelphia toward Chicago	Three Rivers 1995–2005	Newark Penn toward New York
Philadelphia toward Chicago	Broadway Limited Until 1995	Newark Penn toward New York
North Philadelphia toward Kansas City	National Limited	Newark Penn toward New York
North Philadelphia toward Washington, D.C.	Montrealer	Newark Penn toward Montreal
Philadelphia toward Miami	Silver Star Until 2024	Newark Penn toward New York
Preceding station	Pennsylvania Railroad	Following station
Morrisville toward Chicago	Main Line	Princeton Junction toward New York or Exchange Place
Morrisville toward Suburban Station	Trenton Line	Terminus
Warren Street toward East Stroudsburg	Belvidere Delaware Railroad	Terminus
Bordentown Terminus	Bordentown Branch	Terminus
Location

Trenton Transit Center is the main passenger train station in Trenton, New Jersey. Located along the Northeast Corridor, it is served by Amtrak intercity trains plus NJ Transit and SEPTA Regional Rail trains. It is the southern terminus of the NJ Transit Northeast Corridor Line and the northern terminus of the SEPTA Trenton Line. It is also the northern terminus of the NJ Transit River Line service and a terminal for NJ Transit and SEPTA buses.

== Station design ==
The primary station building is located on South Clinton Avenue on the west side of the tracks, with a smaller building on the east side. The four-track below-grade Northeast Corridor widens to eight tracks at the station: four platform tracks serving two accessible island platforms, two center bypass tracks, and two outside siding tracks. A non-accessible side platform, not normally in use, is located next to the eastern siding track. A footbridge connects the station buildings and the platforms. The terminal for the River Line, with two tracks and two side platforms, is located across south Clinton Avenue from the main station building.

== History ==
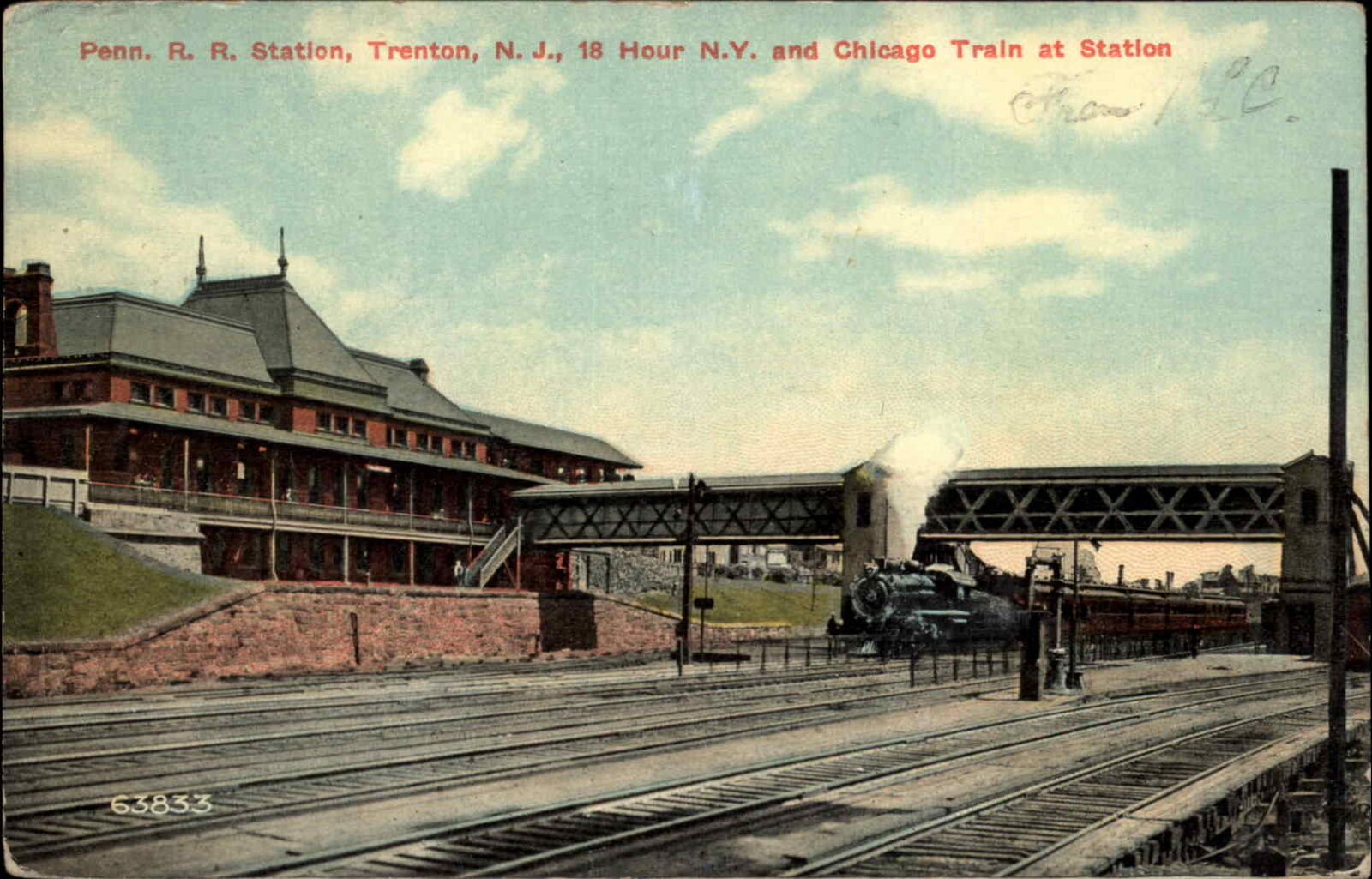
1911 postcard of the station

Rail service in Trenton dates back to the days of the Camden and Amboy Railroad, which built a station on East Street in 1837, until it was moved to the current site in 1863. The C&A was merged into the United New Jersey Railroad and Canal Company in 1867 and acquired by the Pennsylvania Railroad in 1893, which replaced the station the same year.

As with many PRR stations, especially in New Jersey, the station became a Penn Central station once the New York Central merged with the PRR in 1968. Amtrak took over intercity railroad service in 1971, but Penn Central continued to serve commuters, even as the station building closed in 1972. In 1976, the bankrupt Penn Central and Amtrak built the new Trenton Rail Station just before Penn Central's rail assets were taken over by Conrail. It was built to a standard template used at many Amtrak stations built in the 1970s and early 1980s, with a rectangular shape and a boxy, cantilevered metal roof. NJ Transit Rail Operations took over the station when it acquired Conrail's New Jersey commuter lines in 1983, but the station continued to serve Amtrak as well as SEPTA Regional Rail to Philadelphia. From 2006 to 2008, a major reconstruction project authorized by NJT took place with $46 million worth of federal aid, and $33 million worth of state funding that resulted in the current Trenton Transit Center.
