= Cornwells Heights, Pennsylvania =

Unincorporated community in Pennsylvania, US

- Census-designated place
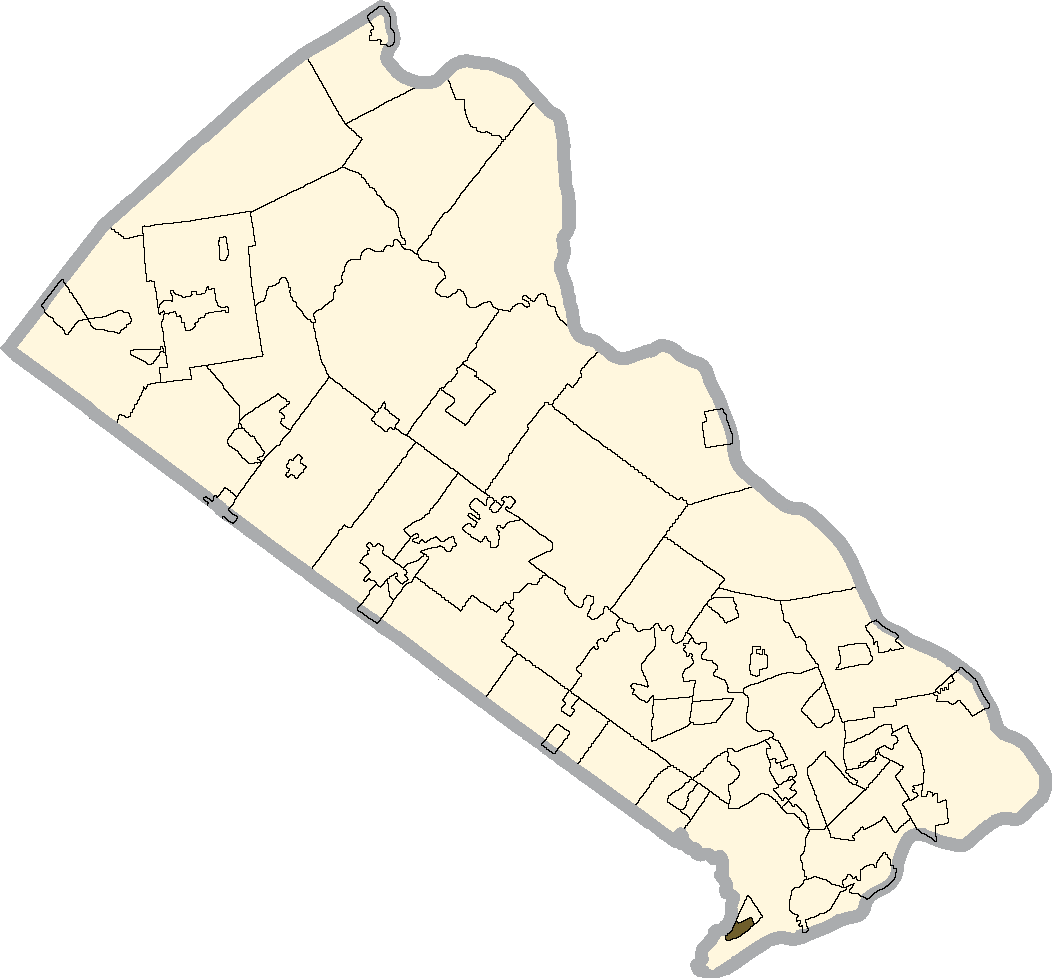
- Location of Cornwells Heights within Bucks County

- Location of Cornwells Heights within Pennsylvania Cornwells Heights (the United States)
- Coordinates: 40°04′36″N 74°56′56″W
- Country: United States
- State: Pennsylvania
- County: Bucks
- Township: Bensalem

Area
  - Total: 0.47 sq mi (1.23 km^{2})
  - Land: 0.47 sq mi (1.23 km^{2})
  - Water: 0 sq mi (0.00 km^{2})
- Elevation: 69 ft (21 m)

Population (2020)
  - Total: 1,251
  - Density: 2,631.5/sq mi (1,016.03/km^{2})
- Time zone: UTC-5 (Eastern (EST))
  - Summer (DST): UTC-4 (EDT)
- ZIP code: 19020
- Area codes: 215, 267 and 445
- GNIS feature ID: 1200071

Cornwells Heights is a census-designated place located in Bensalem Township in Bucks County, Pennsylvania, United States. The community was formerly part of Cornwells Heights-Eddington, but was split into two separate CDPs. As of the 2010 census, the population was 1,391. The Cornwells Heights train station, with a park-and-ride with access to Interstate 95, serves SEPTA Regional Rail's Trenton Line and Amtrak's Keystone Service along the Northeast Corridor.

== Demographics ==
Historical population
| Census | Pop. | Note | %± |
|---|---|---|---|
| 2020 | 1,251 | | — |
U.S. Decennial Census
