= Dorrance =

Dorrance can refer to:

== People ==
=== Surname ===
- Anson Dorrance (born 1951), American former soccer coach
- Arthur Calbraith Dorrance, American businessman, president of the Campbell Soup Company beginning in 1894
- Daniel G. Dorrance (1811–1896), American politician
- Denise Dorrance, American-born British cartoonist, illustrator and graphic novelist
- Ethel Smith Dorrance (1880–?), American writer
- Harvie James Dorrance (1898–1961), Canadian politician
- John Thompson Dorrance (1873–1930), American chemist who discovered a method to create condensed soup, president of the Campbell Soup Company
- John Dorrance III (born 1943 or 1944), American-born Irish billionaire businessman and Campbell's Soup heir
- Mary Alice Dorrance Malone (born 1949 or 1950), née Dorrance, American billionaire and Campbell's Soup heiress, granddaughter of John Thompson Dorrance
- Michelle Dorrance (born 1979), American dancer and choreographer
- Tom and Bill Dorrance (1906–1999 and 1910–2003, respectively), founders of the natural horsemanship movement

=== Given name ===
- Dory Funk (1919–1973), American professional wrestler and promoter, father of Dory Funk Jr.
- Dory Funk Jr (born 1941), American professional wrestler and trainer
- Dorrance Hill Hamilton (1928–2017), American Campbell's Soup heiress and philanthropist
- Dorrance Kirtland (1770–1840), American politician, lawyer and state court judge

== Fictional characters ==
- Dane Dorrance, leader of the DC Comics Sea Devils band of adventurers
- Edmund Dorrance, alias King Snake, a DC Comics villain
- Dorrance, first name unknown, alias Bane, a DC Comics villain, son of Edmund Dorrance
- Dorrance Marstellar, the oldest of the "Harris Avenue Old Crocks" in Insomnia by Stephen King

== Places in the United States ==
- Dorrance, Kansas, a city
- Dorrance Township, Luzerne County, Pennsylvania

== Other uses ==
- Dorrance Field, the on-campus soccer and lacrosse stadium at the University of North Carolina in Chapel Hill, North Carolina
- Dorrance Publishing Co. a vanity press publisher

== See also ==
- Dorrance House (disambiguation), various houses on the American National Register of Historic Places
- Dorrance Inn, Sterling, Connecticut, on the National Register of Historic Places
