= John Dorrance =

John Dorrance may refer to:

- John Thompson Dorrance (1873–1930), American chemist who discovered a method to create condensed soup, president of the Campbell Soup Company
- John Dorrance III (born 1943/44), American-born Irish billionaire businessman and Campbell's Soup heir
