= Bristol Industrial Historic District =

Historic district in Pennsylvania, United States

- U.S. National Register of Historic Places
- U.S. Historic district
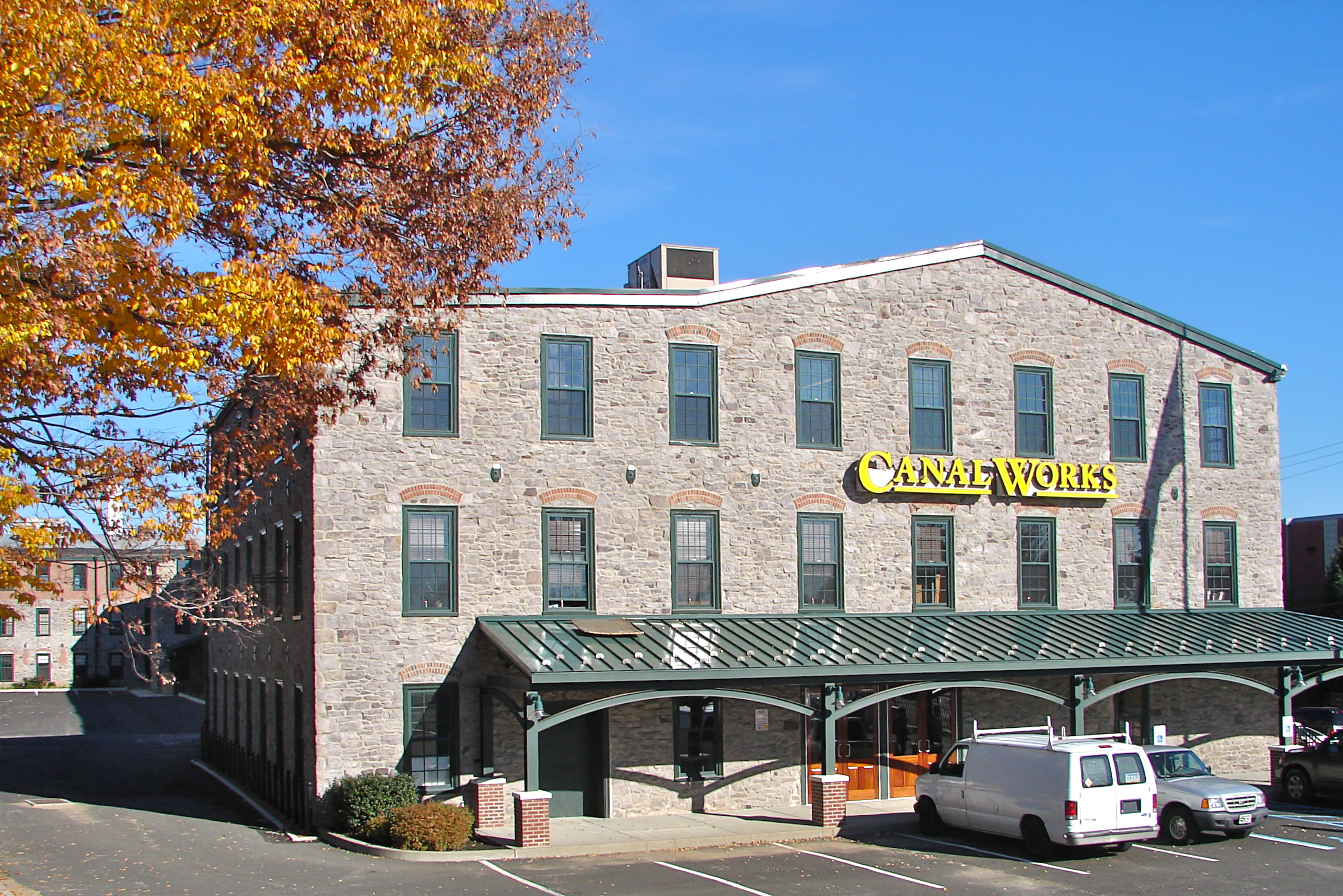
- Building in Bristol Industrial Historic District, November 2010

- Location within Pennsylvania Location within the United States
- Location: Roughly bounded by Pennsylvania Canal, Jefferson Ave., Canal St., Pennsylvania RR, & Beaver St., Bristol, Pennsylvania
- Coordinates: 40°6′7″N 74°51′15″W
- Area: 13.8 acres (5.6 ha)
- Built: 1868
- Built by: Bristol Improvement Co.; Heacock & Hokanson
- NRHP reference No.: 87002016
- Added to NRHP: November 16, 1987

Bristol Industrial Historic District is a national historic district located in Bristol, Bucks County, Pennsylvania. It encompasses nine contributing buildings in a wholly industrial area of Bristol. It includes the Keystone Mill (1877, 1903), Star Mill (1880), Wilson & Fenimore Walpaper Factory (1882), and Peirce and William Planing Mill (1891). The district includes the separately listed Grundy Mill Complex and formerly listed Bristol Carpet Mills. A number of the buildings were constructed by the Bristol Improvement Company between 1876 and 1885.

It was added to the National Register of Historic Places in 1987.
