= Waddill =

Waddill is a surname and a given name. Notable people with the name include:

- Waddill Catchings (1879–1967), American economist
- Edmund Waddill Jr. (1855–1931), Virginia lawyer and American politician
- James R. Waddill (1842–1917), American politician
- Joanna Fox Waddill (1838–1899), nurse assisting Confederate soldiers during the American Civil War
