= Bristol Historic District =

Historic district in Pennsylvania, United States

- U.S. National Register of Historic Places
- U.S. Historic district
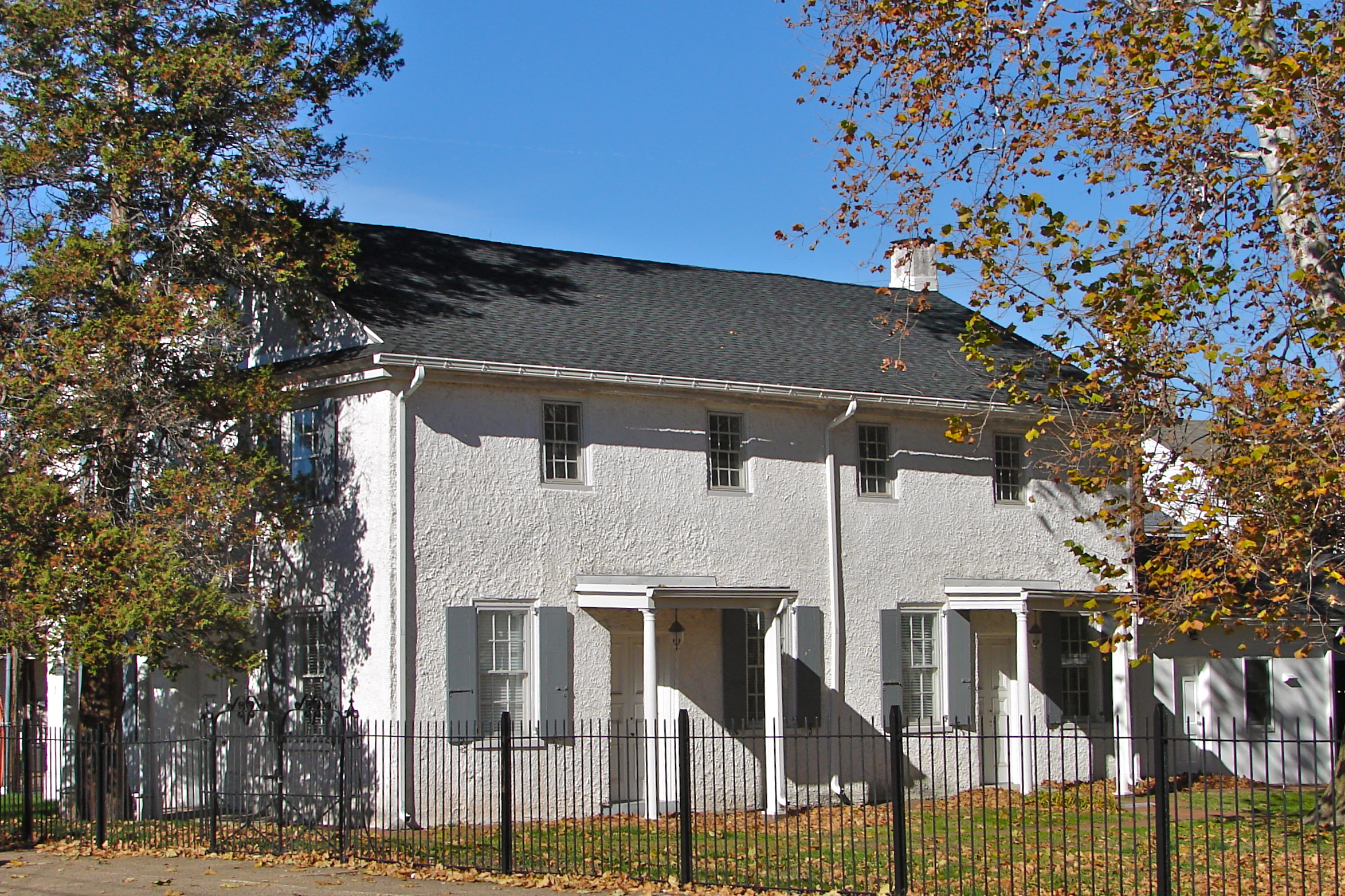
- Bristol Friends Meetinghouse

- Location within Pennsylvania Location within the United States
- Location: Roughly bounded by Pond, Cedar, E. Lincoln Sts., the Delaware River, and E. Mill St., Bristol, Pennsylvania
- Coordinates: 40°5′53″N 74°51′10″W
- Area: 28 acres (11 ha)
- Architect: Sloan, Samuel; et al.
- Architectural style: Mid 19th Century Revival, Late Victorian, Federal
- NRHP reference No.: 87000665
- Added to NRHP: April 30, 1987

The Bristol Historic District in Bristol, Pennsylvania was included on the National Register of Historic Places in 1987. The district has over 300 buildings, a few dating back to the early eighteenth century. It includes 28 acres, which is the area of the original town as laid out in 1697 and is bounded by the Delaware River, and Lincoln, Pond, Cedar, and Mill Streets. Most of the buildings are residential and only 22 are considered to be non-historic intrusions to the district.

== History ==
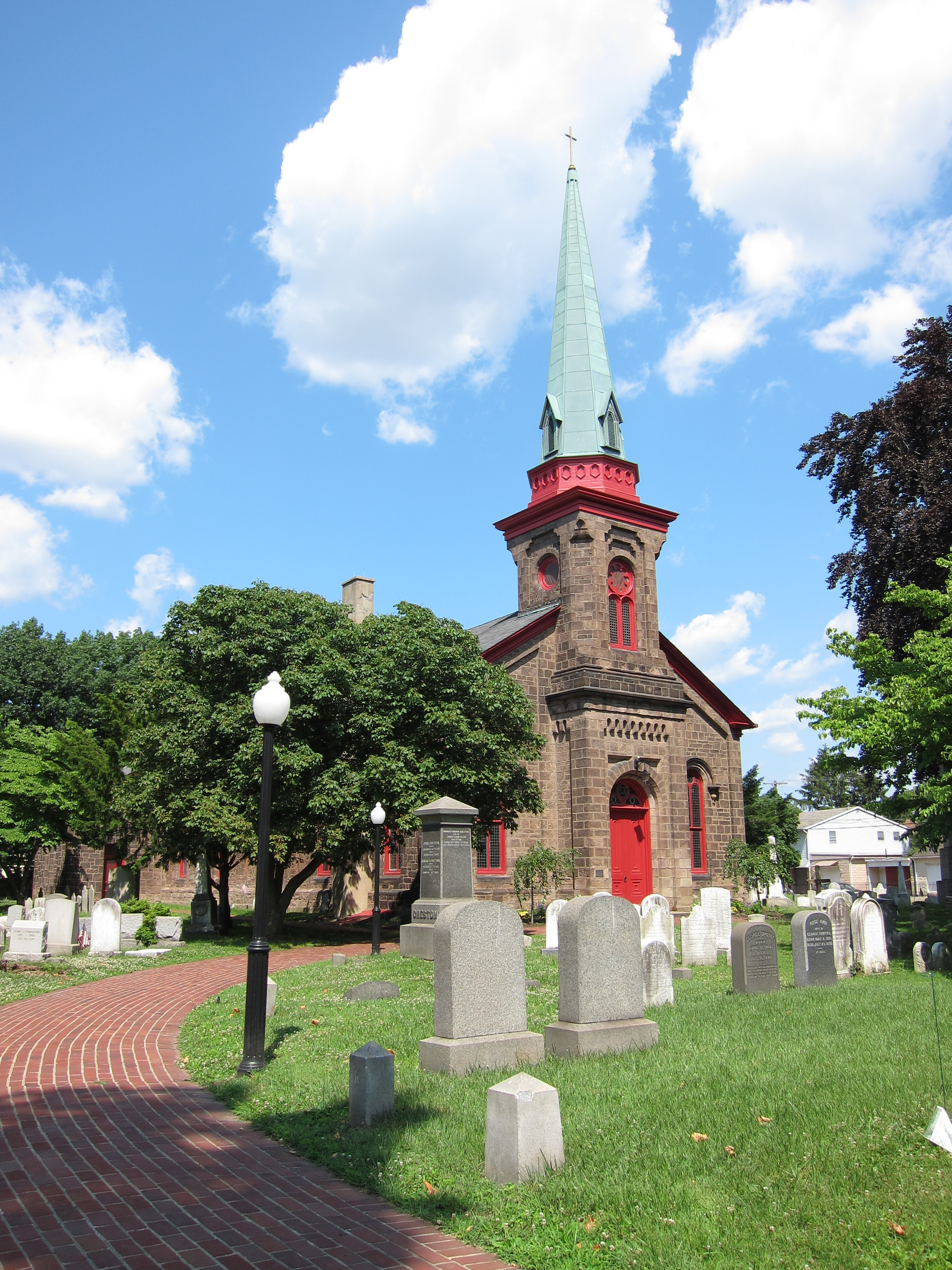
St. James Episcopal Church, designed by Samuel Sloan.

Bristol's first European settler, Samuel Clift, operated a ferry across the Delaware River starting in 1681. A Quaker settlement soon grew near the ferry, and in 1697 residents petitioned the Provincial Council to establish the community as the third town in the Pennsylvania Colony. The Bristol Friends Meetinghouse, built in 1711-1714 and partially reconstructed in 1728, is still standing and represents this era of the town's history. Many other buildings burned down in the fire of 1724.

During the last half of the 18th century the town was an important station on the New York to Philadelphia stagecoach route. The Delaware Hotel, at Radcliffe and Mill Street, was originally built in 1765 but has been added to many times since. The 1781 Thomas Belford residence at 200 Mill Street, later turned into a drug store, also represents this era. From the 1780s to the 1820s Bath Springs, just north of the original town, became a famous spa and large residences were built by wealthy Philadelphians and New Yorkers. Shipbuilding was also an important industry.

In 1832 the Delaware Division of the Pennsylvania Canal was completed with Bristol at its southern end, and the town became a transportation hub. Business boomed with hotels, wharves, docks and warehouses lining the riverfront. About 1855 the boom ended as the canal gained access to the Delaware River to the north at New Hope, allowing traffic to New York to bypass Bristol. Many of the houses in the 300 block of Radcliffe Street were built during this period. The 1851 First Baptist Church was designed by Thomas U. Walter. St. James Episcopal Church, designed by Samuel Sloan was completed in 1857. The Dorrance Mansion was completed during the Civil War.

Following the Civil War to town's economy recovered as mills and factories were built along the canal, which provided both water power and transportation. Bristol became the largest center of industry in Bucks County and the town grew with both workers housing and the mansions of industrialists.

== Gallery ==
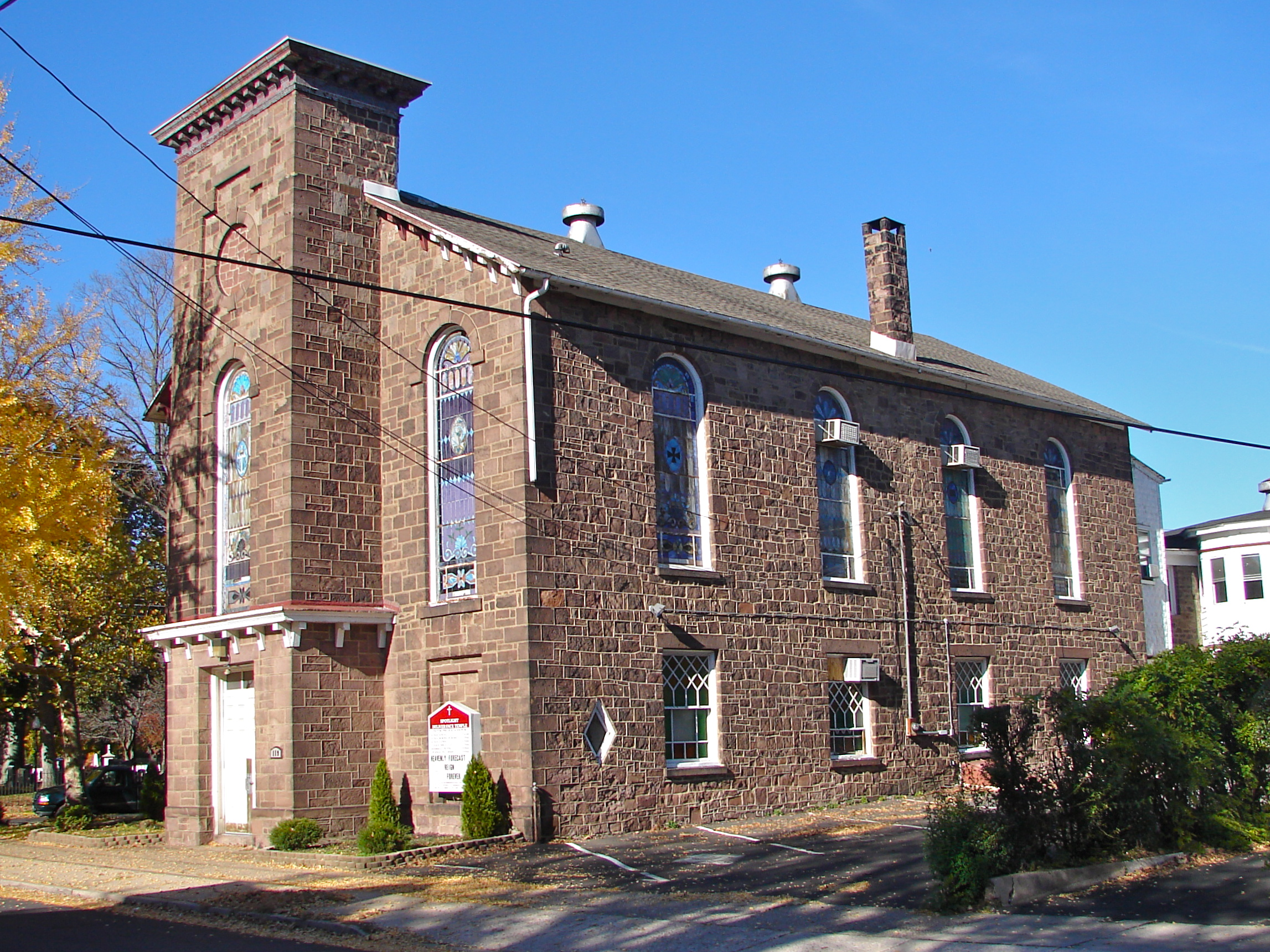
First Baptist Church, designed by Thomas U. Walter

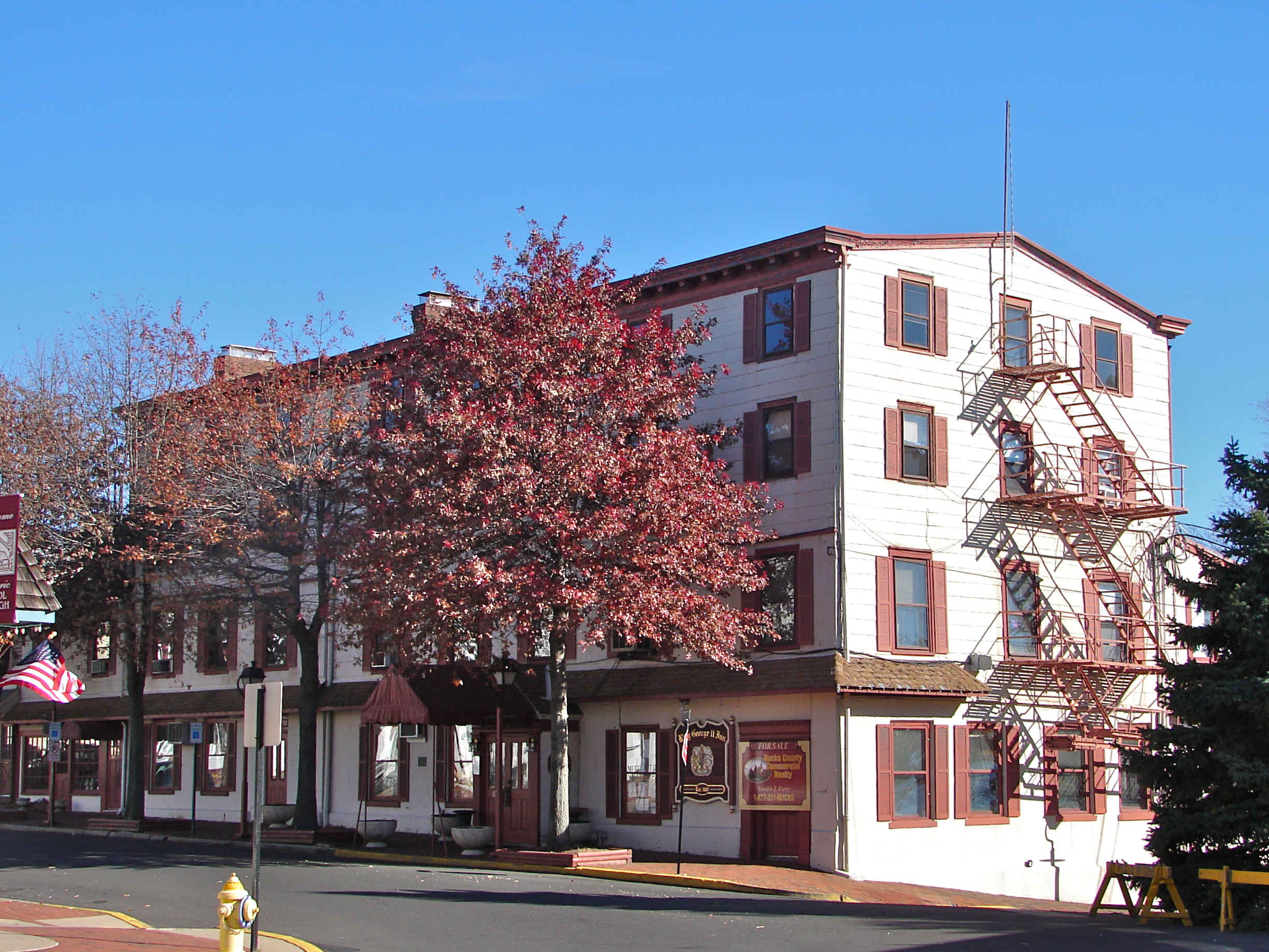
King George II Inn

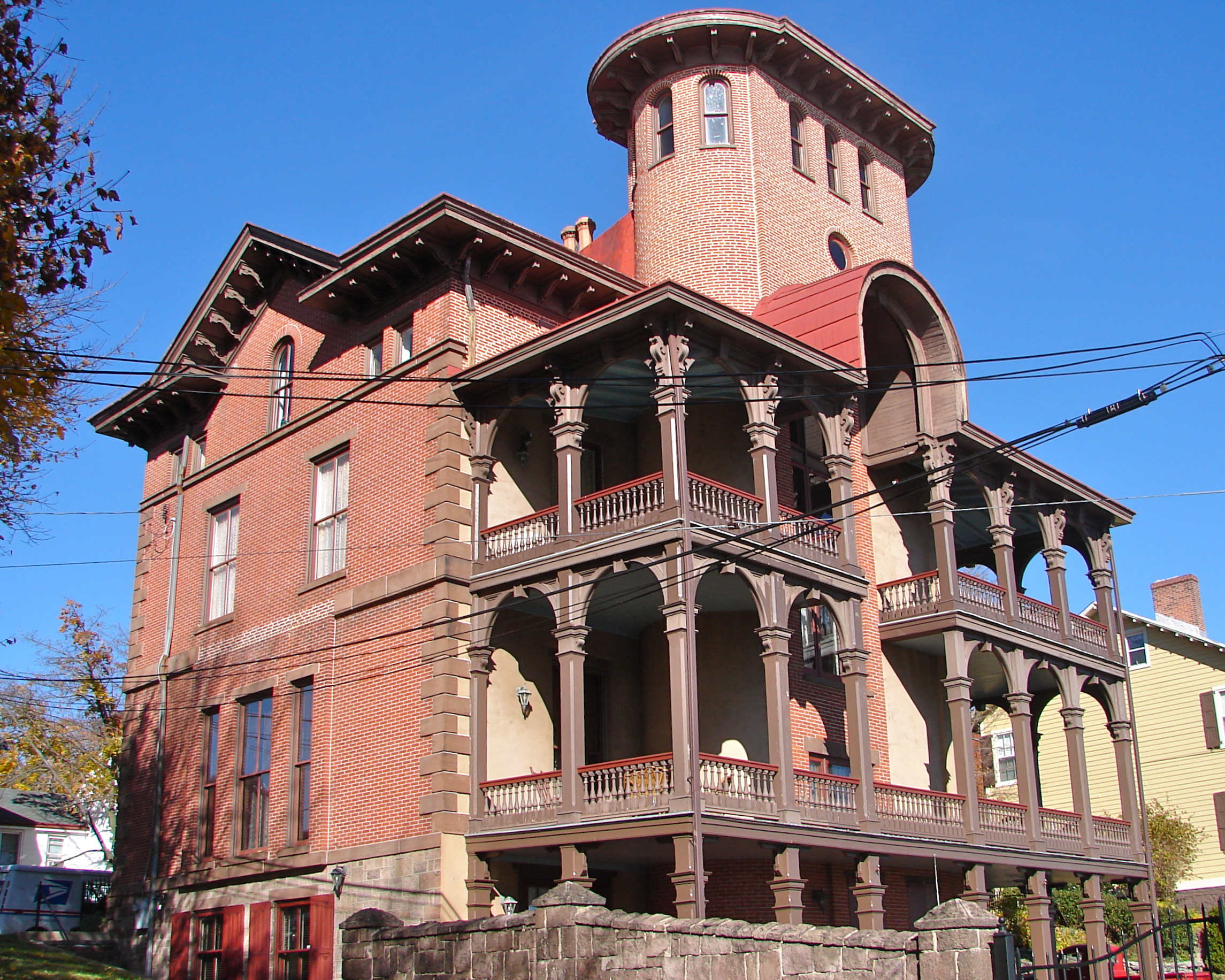
Riverfront of the Dorrance Mansion

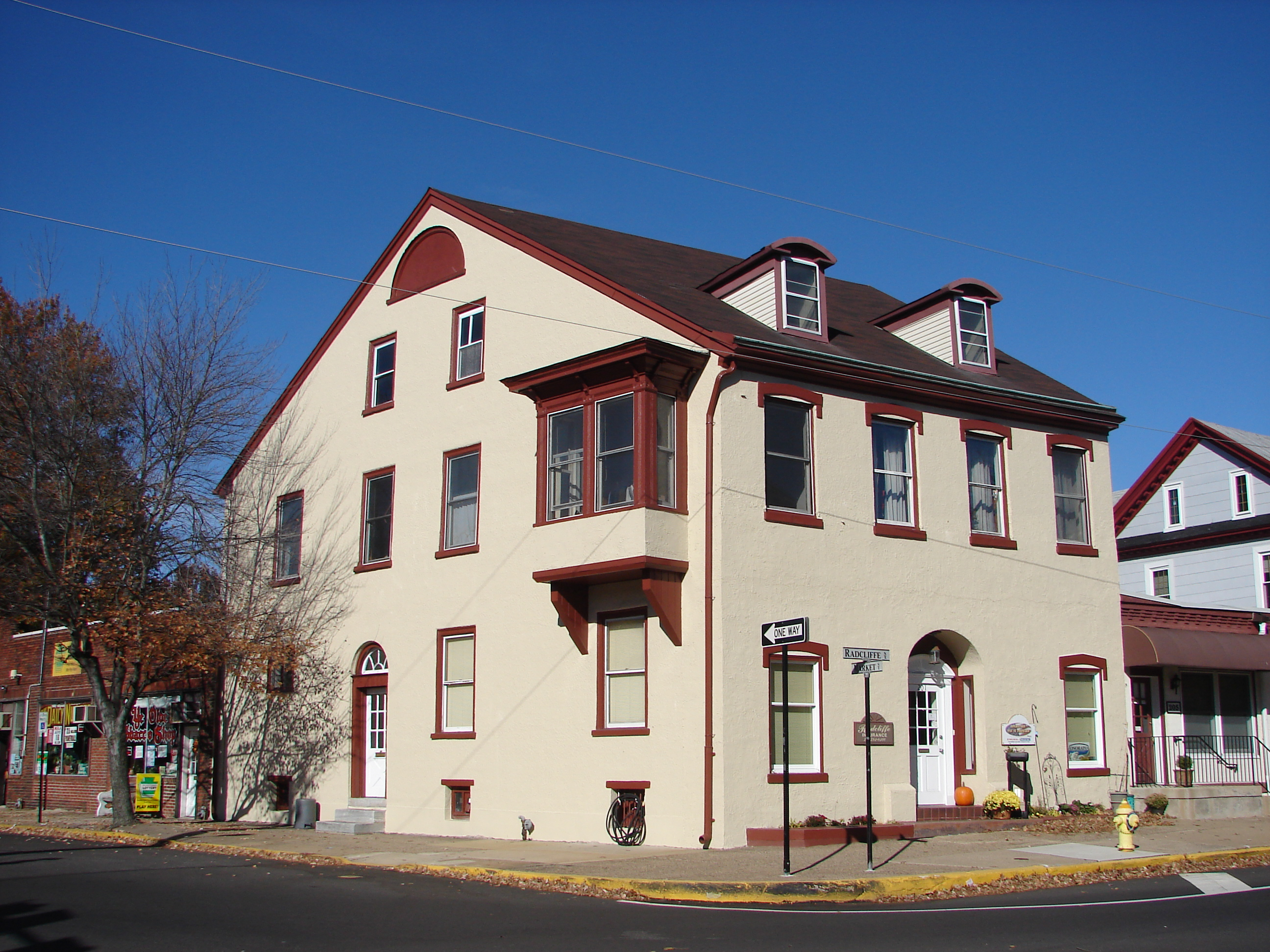
Old inn at Radcliffe and Market Streets
