= Jefferson Avenue School =

- U.S. National Register of Historic Places
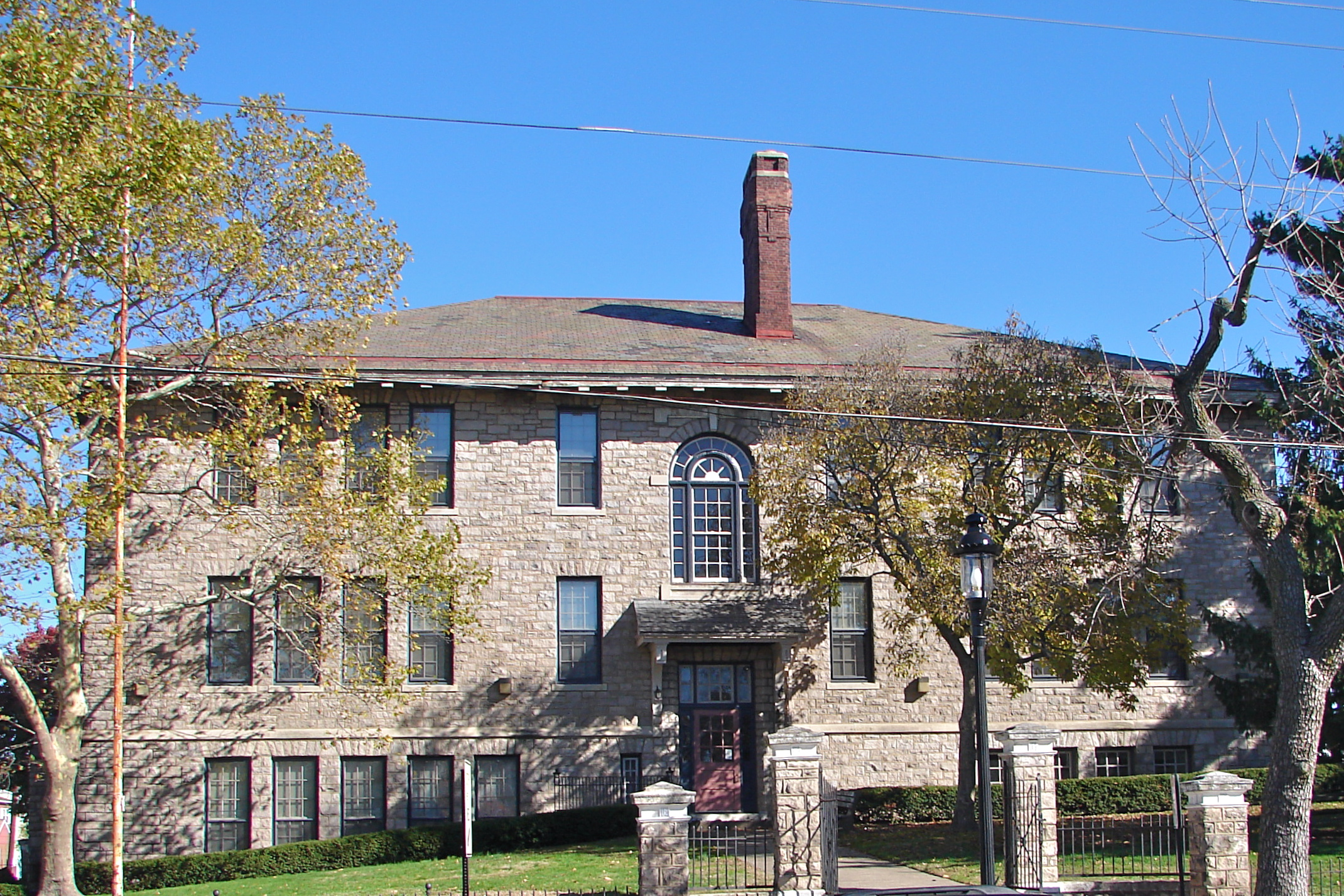
- Jefferson Avenue School, November 2010

- Location within Pennsylvania Location within the United States
- Location: Jefferson Ave. & Pond St., Bristol, Pennsylvania
- Coordinates: 40°06′08″N 74°50′56″W
- Area: 0.7 acres (0.28 ha)
- Built: 1908
- Architect: Heacock & Hokanson
- Architectural style: Colonial Revival, Other, Georgian Revival
- NRHP reference No.: 85001569
- Added to NRHP: July 18, 1985

The Jefferson Avenue School is an historic American school building in Bristol, Bucks County, Pennsylvania, United States.

It was added to the National Register of Historic Places in 1985.

== History and architectural features ==
Built in 1908, this historic structure is a three-story, fieldstone schoolhouse building with limestone trim, a hipped roof, and a basement. It features Georgian Revival detailing, including a large central frontispiece with a large semi-elliptical window. About 1986 the school was renovated and became apartments or condominiums.
