= Dorrance Mansion =

Historic house in Pennsylvania, United States

- U.S. National Register of Historic Places
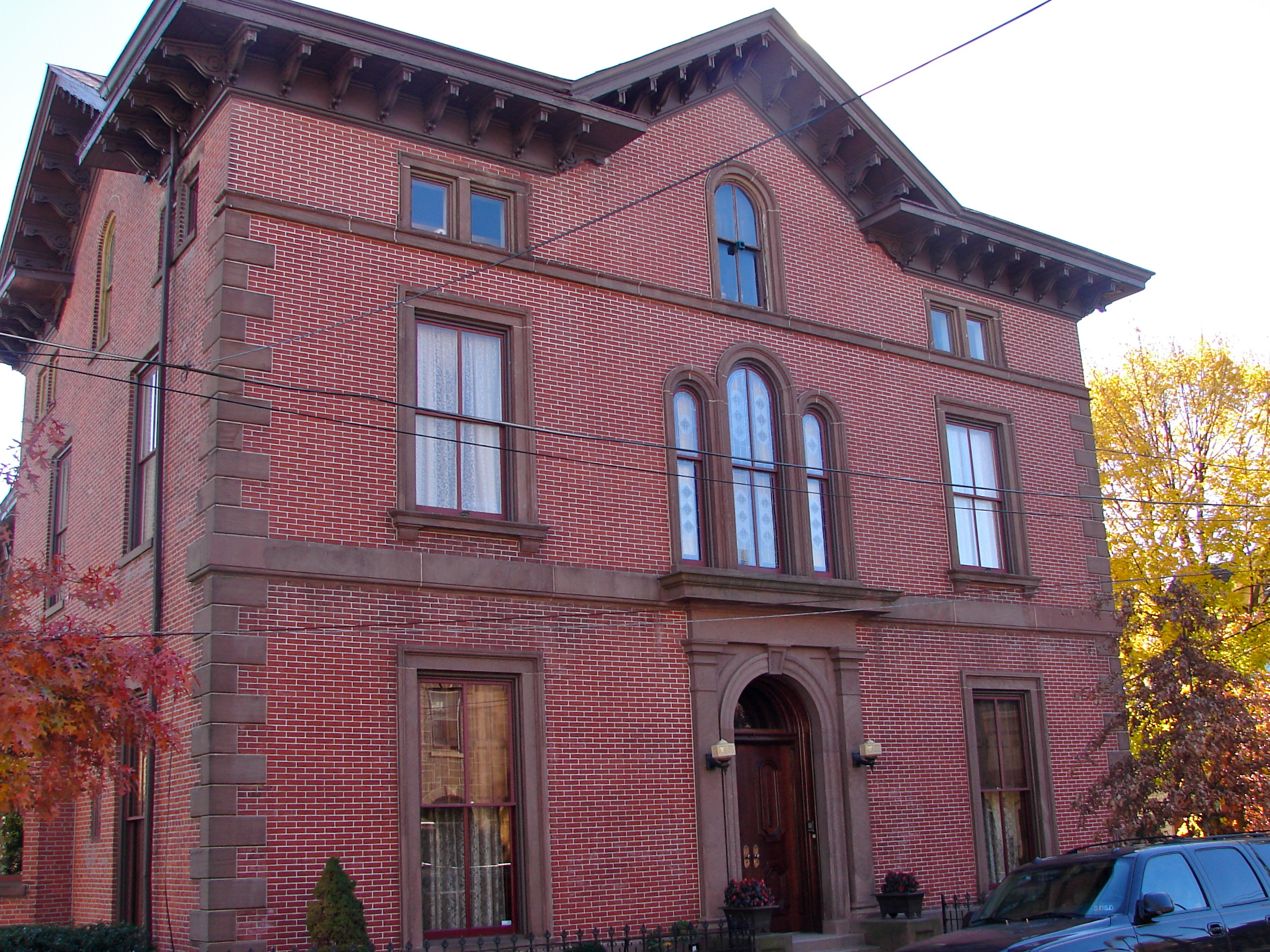

- Location within Pennsylvania Location within the United States
- Location: 300 Radcliffe St., Bristol, Pennsylvania
- Coordinates: 40°5′45″N 74°51′15″W
- Area: 0.4 acres (0.16 ha)
- Built: 1862
- Architectural style: Italianate
- NRHP reference No.: 86002891
- Added to NRHP: October 16, 1986

The Dorrance Mansion is a historic house built in 1862–63, located at 300 Radcliffe St., Bristol, Bucks County, Pennsylvania on the Delaware River in the Bristol Historic District. The house represents the lavish life of Bristol's early Victorian industrialists. It is considered one of the grandest homes on Radcliffe Street and is the only example of residential Italianate architecture in Bristol. The house was added to the National Register of Historic Places in 1986.

== Architecture ==
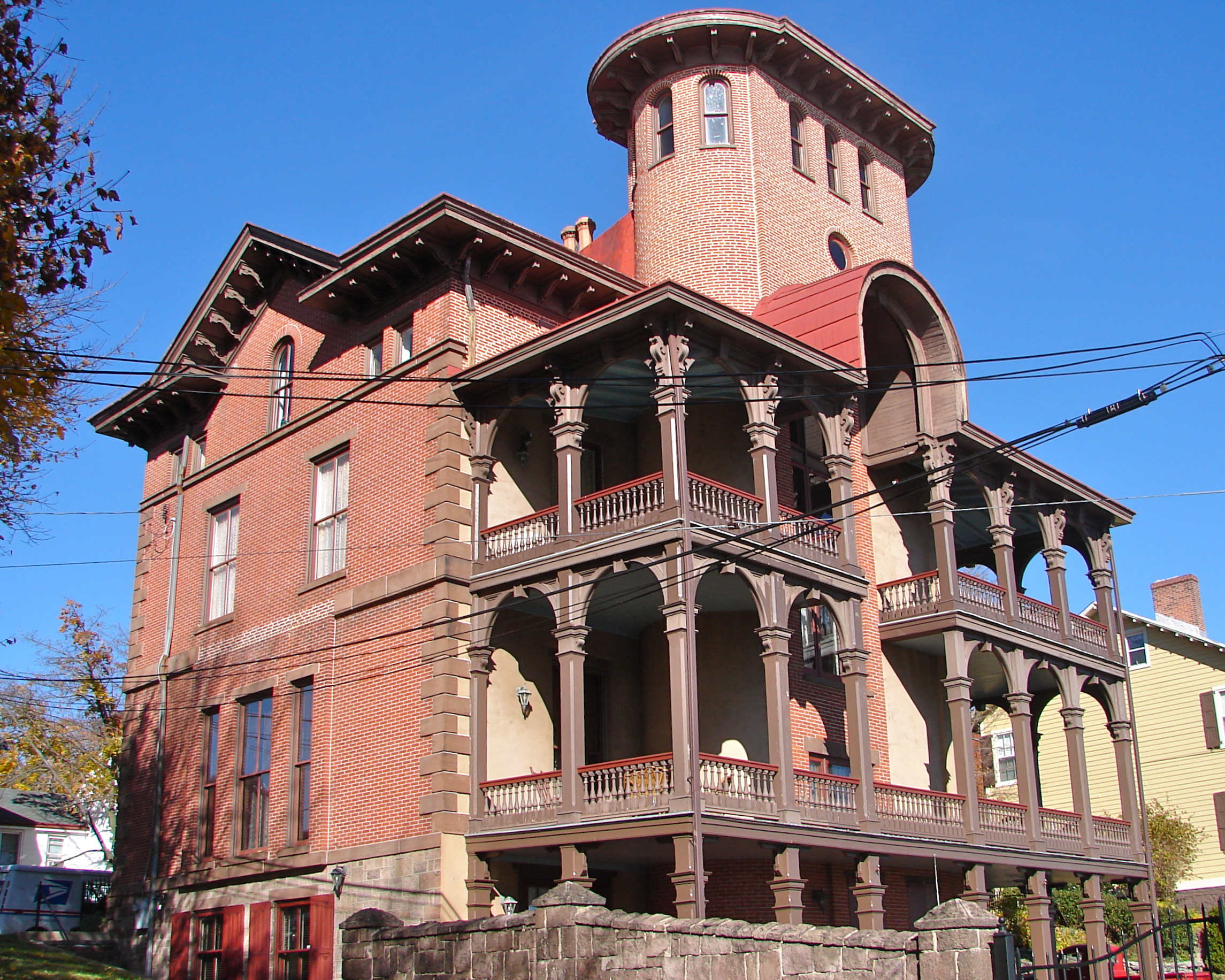
Dorrance Mansion from the southwest

The brick mansion is nearly unchanged since its construction. An illusion of great height is given by the symmetrical front facade with the windows on the upper floors decreasing in their proportions. The rear three-story porch and five-story elliptical central tower are especially distinctive. The tower contains a winding staircase that extends from the basement to the top of the tower. The original kitchen is in the basement, and the tower contains a second staircase that connects the kitchen with the dining room. The river level foundation is built of random coursed fieldstone.

== History ==
John Dorrance, Sr., bought an interest in Bristol Mills about 1827 and later bought out his partners. The mills themselves were constructed in 1701. Dorrance became a director in companies involved in steamboat lines, railroads, and shipping. He participated in local business, politics, and government from 1835 to 1860. During this time the mills sold corn meal to the West Indies and to Southern States. Dorrance lived across the street while the mansion was being built on a lot he bought in 1828.

After his death in 1869, Dorrance's sons sold the mills, which included a mill race and pond, a saw mill, a grist mill, a lumber yard, canal stables, coal sheds, a blacksmith shop, a store, and two houses. Dorrance's sons inherited the mansion and John, Jr. bought out his brother in 1879. The son of John, Jr., G. Morris Dorrance, later inherited the mansion. The Dorrance family kept the mansion until 1921; soon it was bought by the Bristol Knights of Columbus. The mansion returned to use as a private residence in 1982.

Another son of John Dorrance, Sr., Arthur was an early investor and manager of the Campbell's. Arthur hired his nephew, John Thompson Dorrance, sometimes known as John Dorrance III, who developed the company's condensed soup line, and in 1915 became sole owner of the company. John Thompson Dorrance's grandson, also known as John Dorrance III, sold his share of the company in 1995-96 for about $1.5 billion, and with a 2009 net worth of $2.3 billion was listed as number 296 in the Forbes list of the world's richest people.
