= Jefferson Land Association Historic District =

Historic district in Pennsylvania, United States

- U.S. National Register of Historic Places
- U.S. Historic district
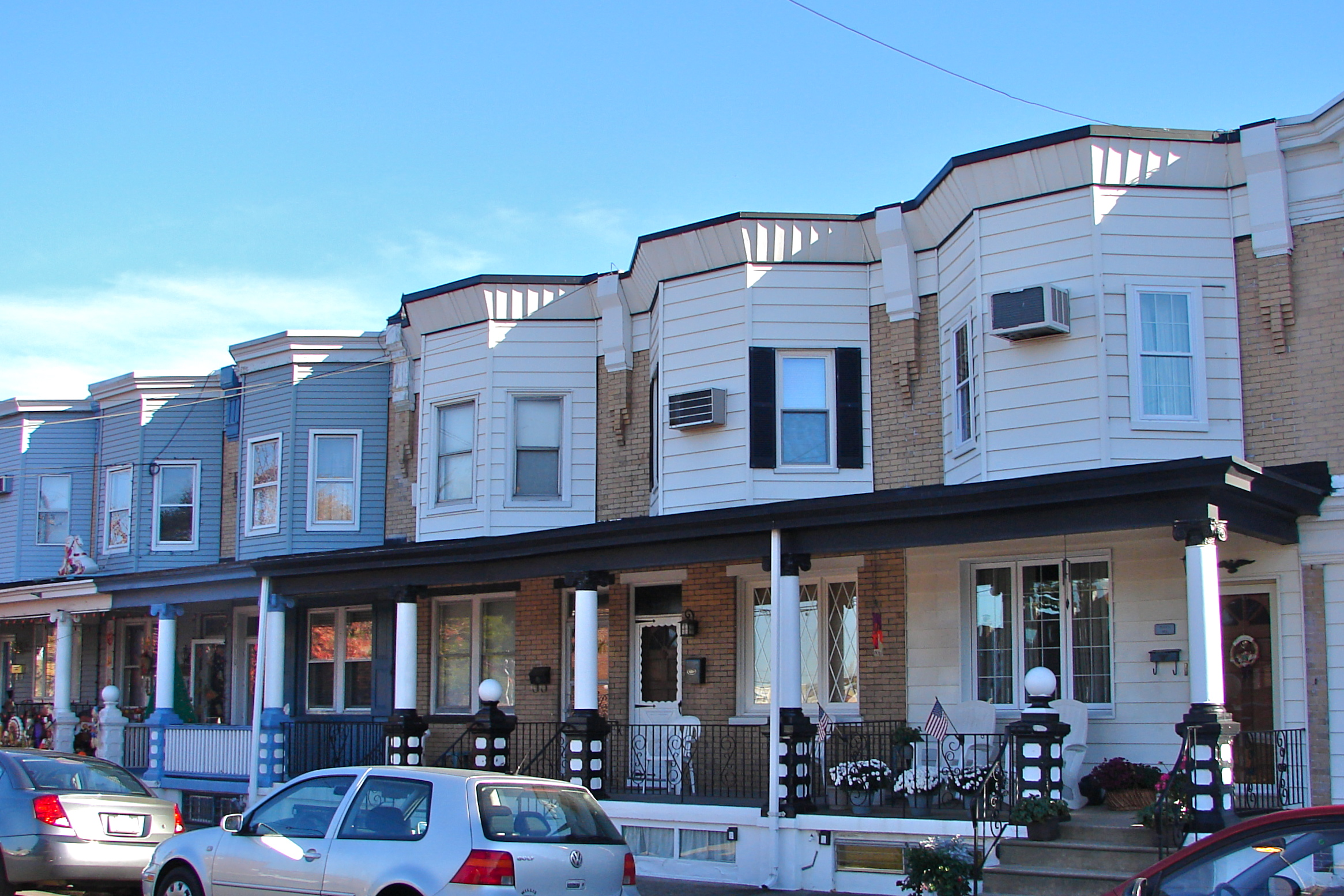
- Jefferson Land Association Historic District, November 2010

- Location within Pennsylvania Location within the United States
- Location: Bounded by Spring St., Jefferson Ave., Garden & Mansion Sts., & Beaver Dam Rd., Bristol, Pennsylvania
- Coordinates: 40°6′24″N 74°51′17″W
- Area: 6.6 acres (2.7 ha)
- Built: 1917-1918
- Built by: Jefferson Land Association
- NRHP reference No.: 87001994
- Added to NRHP: November 5, 1987

The Jefferson Land Association Historic District is a national historic district that is located in Bristol, Bucks County, Pennsylvania.

It was added to the National Register of Historic Places in 1987.

== History and architectural features ==
It encompasses eighty-one contributing buildings that are located within five blocks of a primarily residential area of Bristol. Built between 1917 and 1918, they are two-story, brick rowhouse dwellings with flat roofs. They are characterized by a one-story, unifying front porch for all houses in a block. The second floor has a projecting, three-sided bay and each dwelling has a two-story rear ell. This district also includes five commercial buildings that are situated at the end of rows.
