= Mary Alice Dorrance Malone =

American billionaire (1950–2025)

- Born: February 3, 1950
- Died: June 16, 2025 (aged 75)
- Education: University of Arizona
- Known for: Largest shareholder, Campbell's
- Board member of: Campbell's
- Spouse(s): Stuart Malone (divorced, mid-1990s)
- Children: 2
- Relatives: John Thompson Dorrance (grandfather); John Dorrance III (brother)

Mary Alice Dorrance Malone (February 3, 1950 – June 16, 2025) was an American billionaire and heiress to the Campbell's fortune.

== Early life ==
Mary Alice Dorrance was the daughter of John T. "Jack" Dorrance Jr (d. 1989), the last Dorrance to run Campbell, and the granddaughter of John Thompson Dorrance. She had a bachelor's degree from the University of Arizona.

== Career ==
When her father died in 1989, she and her two brothers shared roughly one-third of the company.

Malone was the Campbell's's largest shareholder, and a board member, along with her brother Bennett Dorrance, a Phoenix real estate developer. Her other brother is John Dorrance III.

== Personal life and death ==
She was married to Stuart Malone, divorced in the mid-1990s, had two children, and lived in Coatesville, Pennsylvania.

From 2009 to 2010, she was the victim of an extortion attempt by her "longtime cook, traveling companion and confidante", involving "a tell-all book and movie about the heiress's personal life".

Malone was "devoted to equestrian sports, she owns expansive estates and performance centers in Pennsylvania and Florida."

In 2006, Malone purchased an oceanfront home in Barnegat Light, New Jersey.

Malone died on June 16, 2025, at the age of 75.
