= Bristol Borough School District =

School district in Pennsylvania

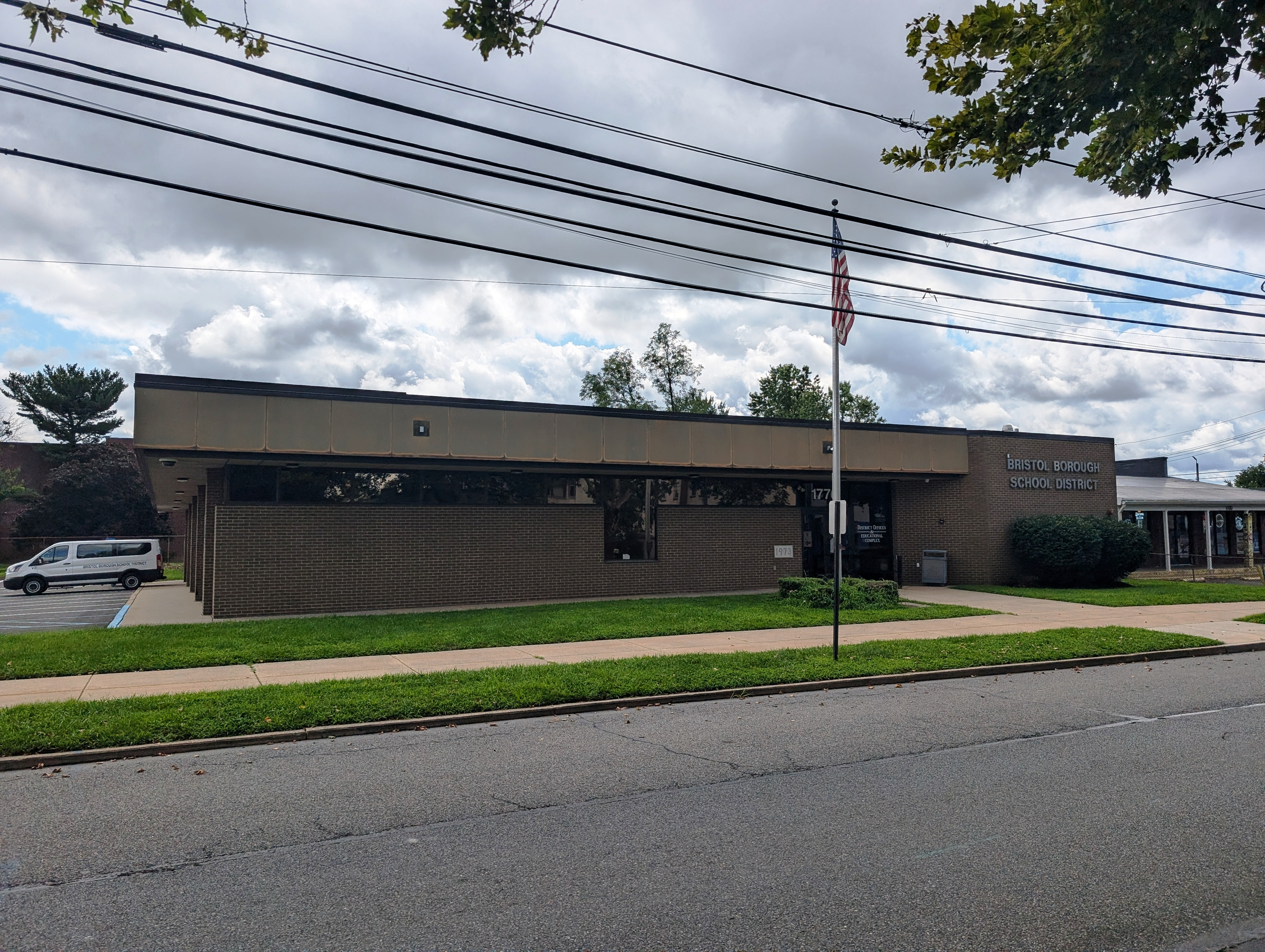
- District offices in Bristol

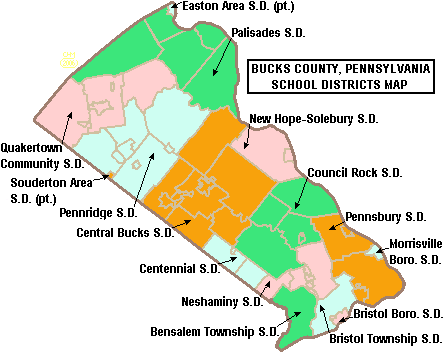
- Bucks County school districts

Address
- 1776 Farragut Avenue Bristol, Pennsylvania, 19007-3706; United States

District information
- Type: Public

Students and staff
- District mascot: Warriors

Other information
- Website: bbsd.org

The Bristol Borough School District is a diminutive, suburban, public school district located in southern Bucks County, Pennsylvania. The district serves the Borough of Bristol. It encompasses just 1.7 square miles (4.4 km^{2}), with a population of 12,000 people at the 1990 federal census. According to 2000 federal census data, it served a resident population of 9,923 people. By 2010, the cistrict's population declined further to 9,729 people. In 2009, Bristol Borough School District residents’ per capita income was $17,198, while the median family income was $44,517. In the Commonwealth, the median family income was $49,501 and the United States median family income was $49,445, in 2010.

The district is served by Bucks County IU 22 for special education services and professional development programs.

Bristol Borough School District operates Bristol Jr./Sr. High School and Snyder-Girotti Elementary School.

== Extracurriculars ==
Bristol Borough School District offers a variety of clubs, activities interscholastic sports.

=== Sports ===
The district funds:

Boys

- Baseball – AA
- Basketball- AA
- Bowling – AAAAAA
- Cross country – A
- Football – A
- Track and field – AA
- Wrestling – AA

Girls

- Basketball – AA
- Bowling – AAAAAA
- Cheer – AAAAAA
- Cross country – A
- Field hockey – A
- Softball – AA
- Track and field – AA

Middle school sports

Boys

- Baseball
- Basketball
- Football
- Wrestling

Girls

- Basketball
- Cheer
- Field hockey
- Softball

According to PIAA directory March 2018.
