= Bristol, Pennsylvania =

Borough in Pennsylvania, US

- Borough
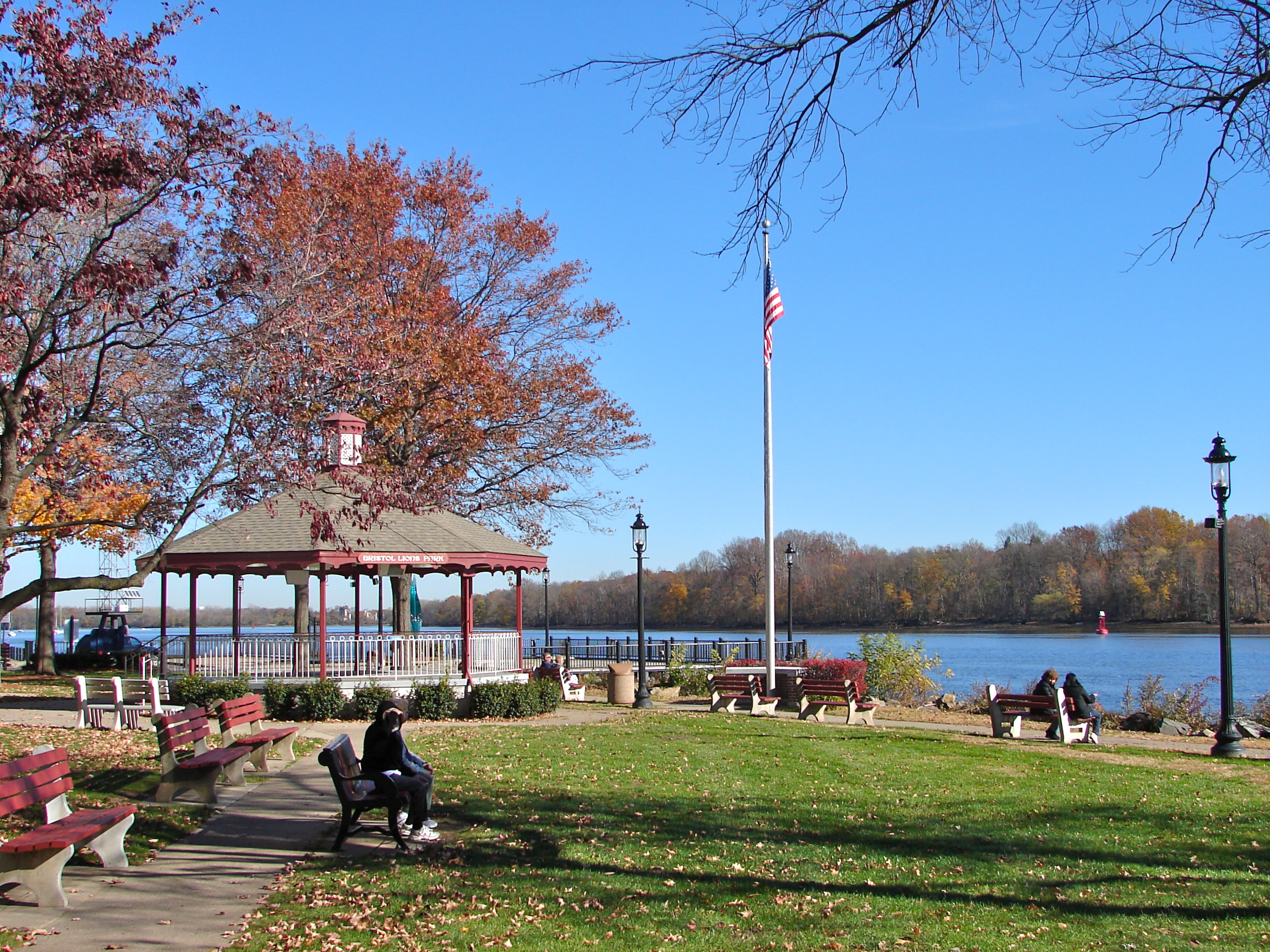
- Lions Park on the Delaware River in Bristol, 2010

- Seal

- Location of Bristol Borough in Bucks County, Pennsylvania

- Location of Bristol Borough in Pennsylvania Bristol (the United States)
- Coordinates: 40°06′12″N 74°51′05″W
- Country: United States
- State: Pennsylvania
- County: Bucks
- Settled: 1681

Government
  - Mayor: Frank Peranteau

Area
  - Total: 1.96 sq mi (5.07 km^{2})
  - Land: 1.70 sq mi (4.40 km^{2})
  - Water: 0.26 sq mi (0.67 km^{2})
- Elevation: 20 ft (6.1 m)

Population (2020)
  - Total: 9,861
  - Density: 5,807.8/sq mi (2,242.41/km^{2})
- Time zone: UTC-5 (Eastern (EST))
  - Summer (DST): UTC-4 (EDT)
- ZIP Code: 19007
- Area codes: 215, 267, and 445
- FIPS code: 42-08760
- Website: www.bristolborough.com

Pennsylvania Historical Marker
- Designated: January 13, 1949

Bristol is a borough in Bucks County, Pennsylvania, United States. It is located 23 miles (37 km) northeast of Center City in Philadelphia opposite Burlington, New Jersey, on the Delaware River.

Bristol was settled in 1681 and first incorporated in 1720. After 1834, it became very important to the development of the American Industrial Revolution as the terminus city of the Delaware Canal, providing greater Philadelphia with the day's high quality anthracite coal from the Lehigh Canal via Easton. The canal and a short trip on the Delaware River also gave the town access to the mineral resources available in Connecticut, New Jersey, and New York via of the Morris Canal, the Delaware and Hudson Canal, and the Delaware and Raritan Canal, respectively, and connected the community to those markets and trade from New York City.

Although its charter was revised in 1905, the original charter remains in effect, making it the third-oldest borough in Pennsylvania after Chester and Germantown. As of the 2020 census, Bristol had a population of 9,861. Its current mayor is Joseph A. Saxton. It is served by SEPTA's Trenton Line.

Bristol is located 70.9 miles (114.1 km) southeast of Allentown and 22.4 miles (36.0 km) northeast of Philadelphia.

== History ==
The Delaware Canal at the Bristol Lagoon, November 2025

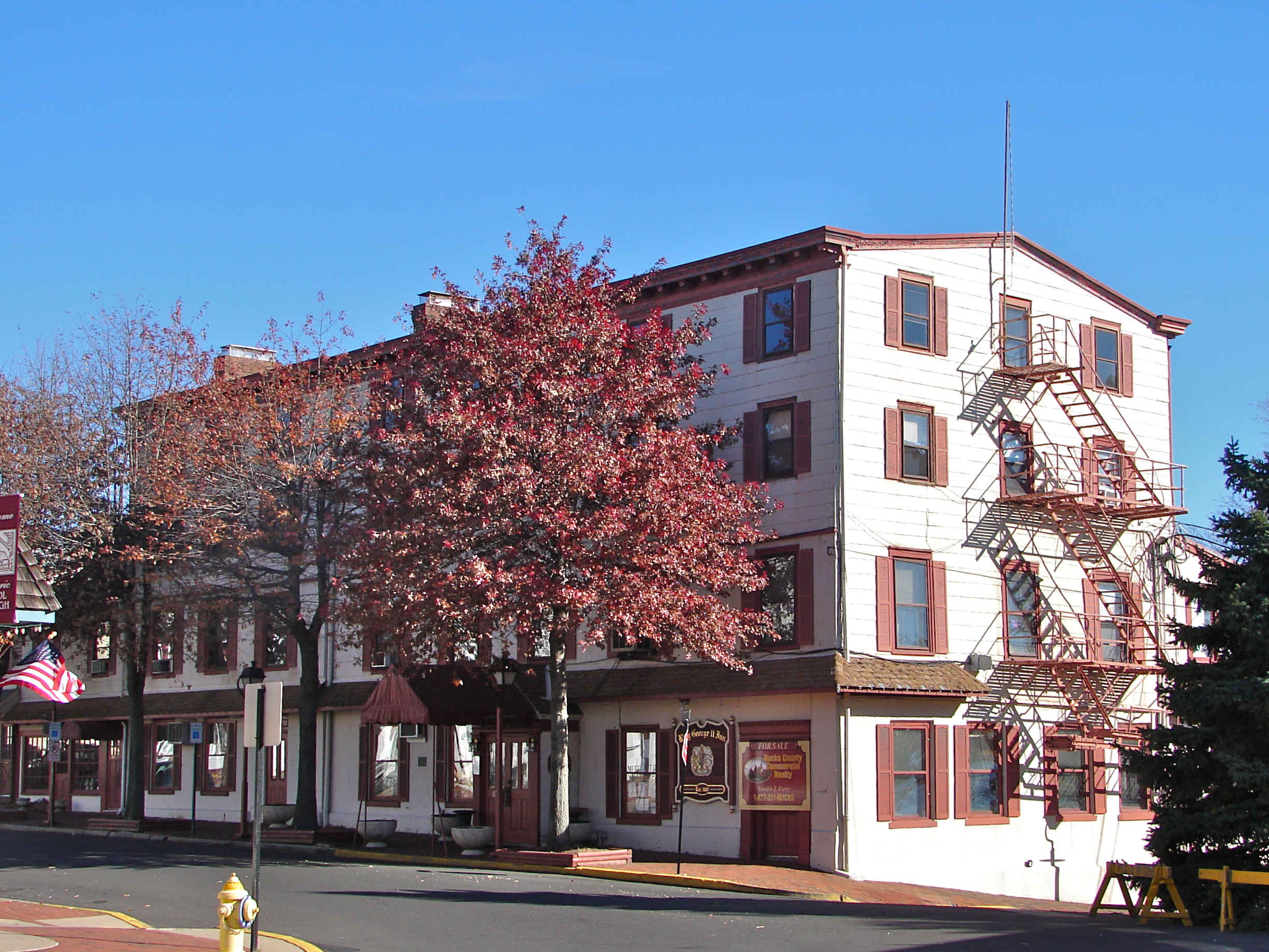
The historic King George II Inn, founded in 1681 in downtown Bristol, the oldest United States–based inn, November 2010

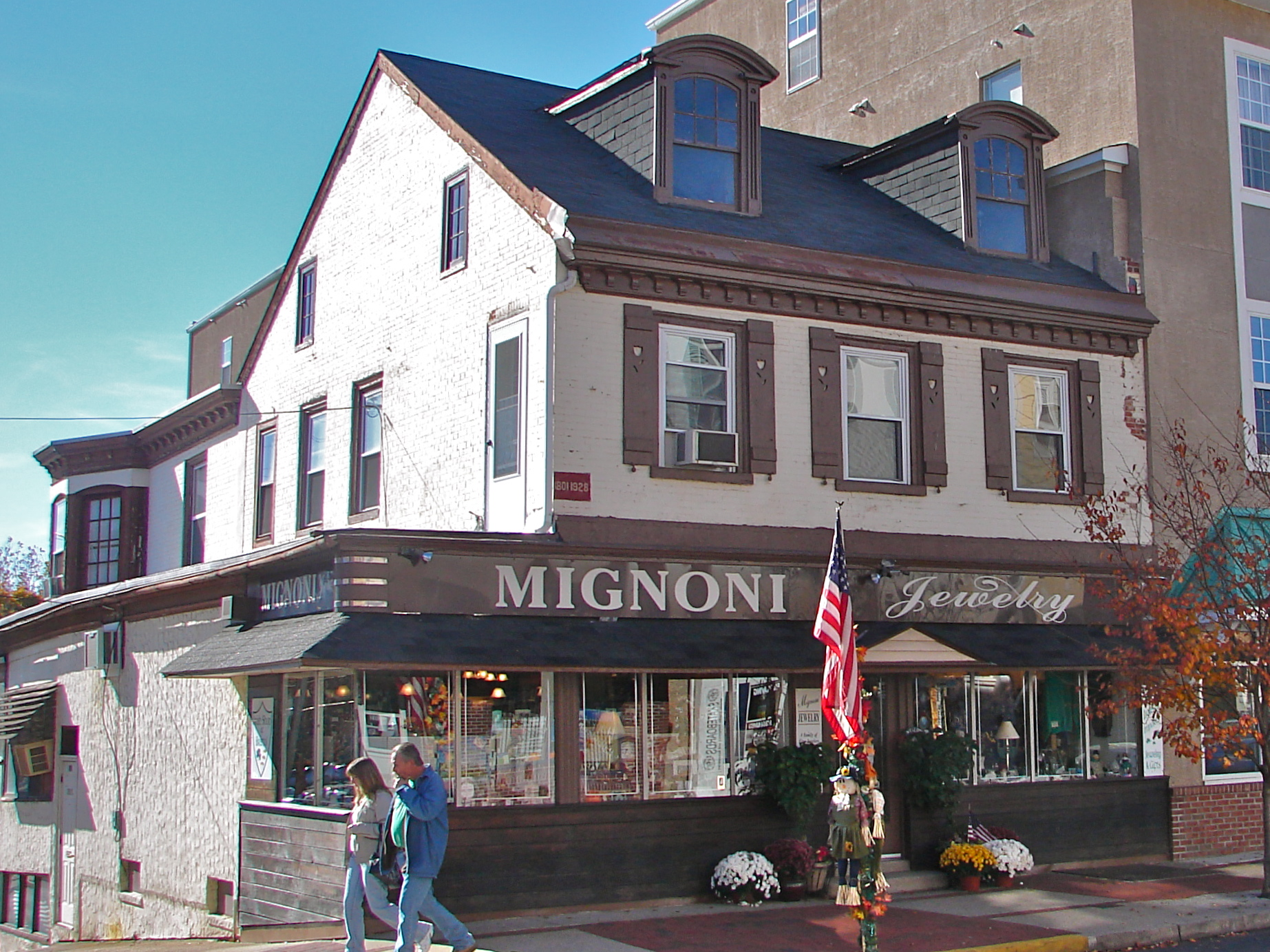
House on Mill Street, built in 1781, November 2010

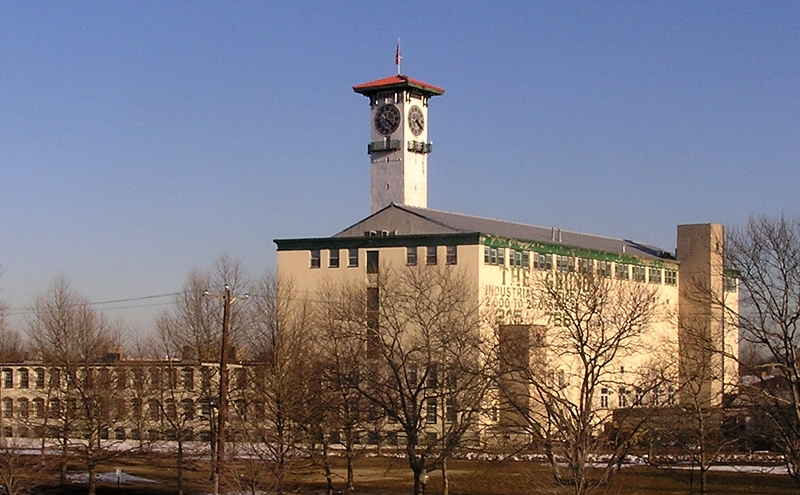
Grundy Mill Complex, a former textile mill in Bristol, March 2011

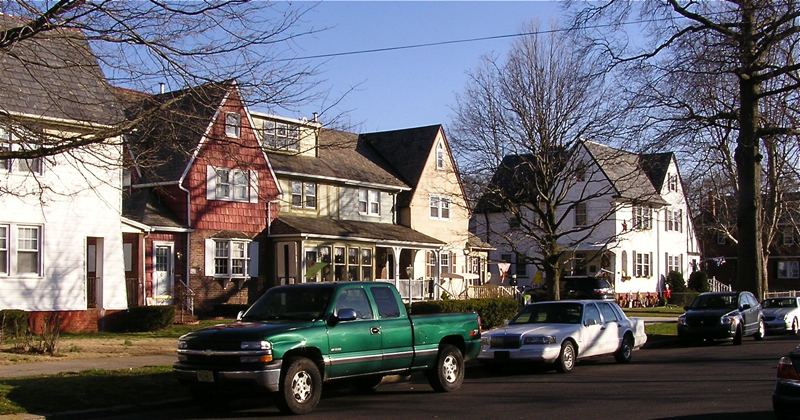
Bristol Borough's Harriman Historic District, March 2011

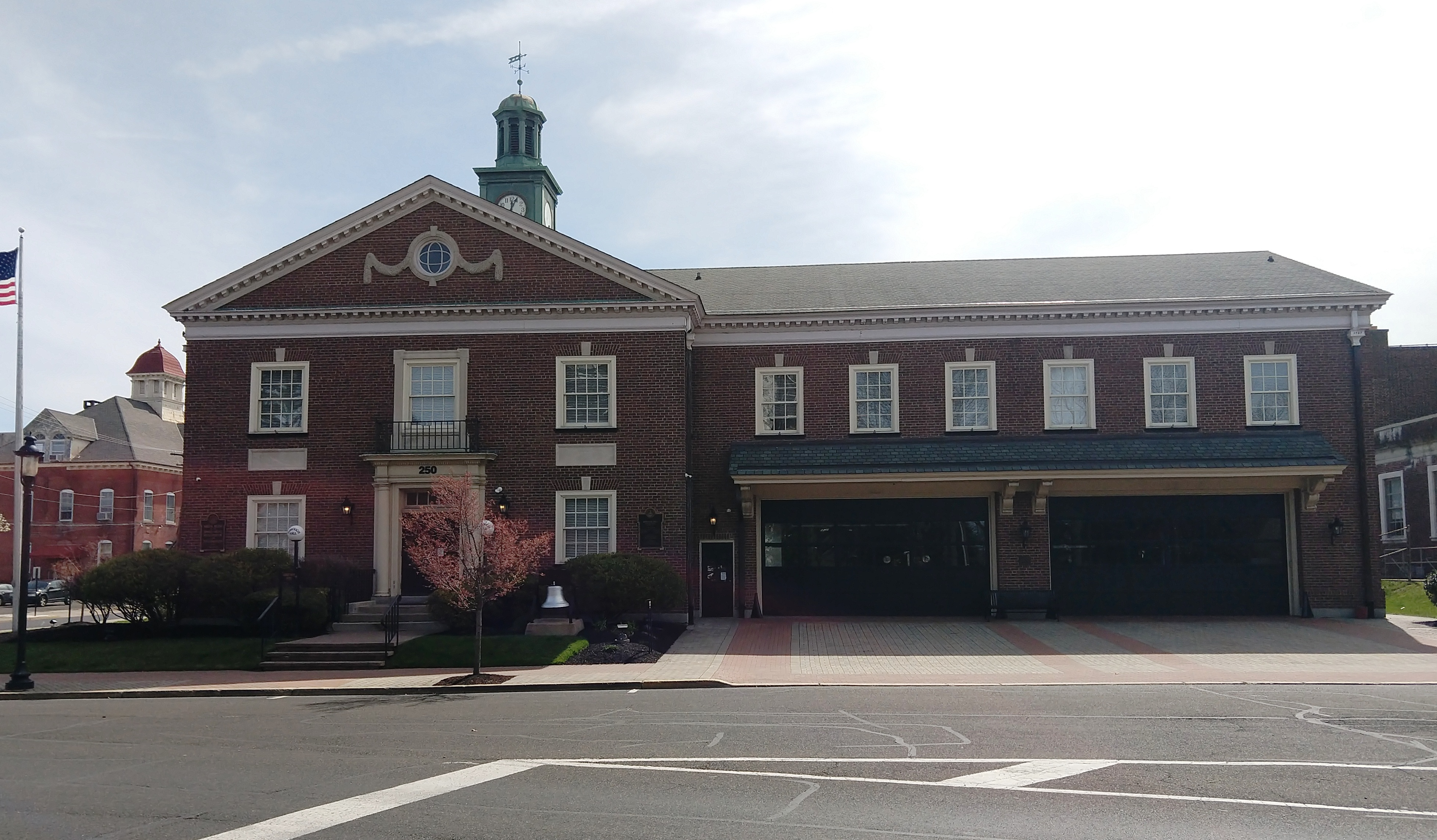
Bristol Borough Hall, March 2024

Samuel Clift founded the Borough of Bristol, having received a land grant from Edmund Andros, who was then governor of New York. The grant became effective on March 14, 1681 (new style) or March 4, 1681 (old style) at the same time as William Penn's Charter from Charles II became effective. Clift was required by the grant to maintain ferry service across the Delaware River to Burlington, New Jersey, and to run a public house or inn. The inn later became known as the George II.

Bristol Borough was settled in 1681, and named after Bristol, England. It was originally used as a port and dock. It is rich in history, with many historic and restored houses along the streets of Radcliffe and Mill. In 1697, the Pennsylvania Provincial Council ordered that a town be laid out in the location. A petition was submitted by Joseph Bond, Anthony Burton, John Hall and William Wharton to the council for incorporation, and was granted in 1702.

Until 1725, Bristol Borough served as county seat of Bucks County.

From its earliest days, it was a center of textile mills, foundries, milling, and miscellaneous manufacturing. With the building of the 60 miles (96.6 km) long, forty feet wide, and five feet deep Delaware Canal, it became a transshipment gateway (Note: Delaware Canal was later organized and known as the Pennsylvania Canal (Delaware Division).) connecting the anthracite barges floating down the Lehigh Canal's end terminal at Easton to Philadelphia. Bristol Borough was chosen to terminate the Delaware Canal because it already had regular shipping connections to other parts of Philadelphia and Delaware River ports by both the era's typical animal powered barges and coastal/inland shipping vessels. Its docks also had regular ferry services to New Jersey and other points east from as early as 1681 until 1931. Developed by John Fitch, Bristol was the home of the first steamboat ferry service taking up to 30 passengers bound for Philadelphia and other ports on the Delaware (Note: Steam boat service between Trenton, New Jersey and Philadelphia also played a key role in community development, since many lines had historic sailing ship ferry stops in Bristol.)

In 1740, William Davis established a shipyard in Bristol, building small vessels such as schooners and sloops. One such vessel was the Morning Glory, noted as the fastest sailing craft on the Delaware. In 1800, John Reed acquired the shipyard.

The expense of digging the canal was justifiable as the banks of the Delaware southerly from Easton were less suitable, there was insufficient real estate for extensive additional docks, so the legislature figured the Delaware Canal avoided the need to transship barge loads of coal to boats, drastically saving costs and time. Since Bristol Borough's long established docks were accessible to the Delaware River, the town also became the Delaware Canal's southern (main distribution) terminal end. (Note: Both the Delaware and the Lehigh canals operated for over 100 years, into the 1930s, and Bristol Borough saw most of that traffic once the canal was online; though some coal shipped from Easton. Canal traffic diminished as the Railroad age matured, but shipping bulk goods by water transport has decided economic advantages, so the canals lasted until the economic crash in the Great Depression.) Consequently, later, the Pennsylvania Railroad would also connect to the anthracite flowing through the canals, to the riverine barge and boat traffic, and to provide rail depots servicing the manufacturies. Even before the canal, Bristol Borough was located along a main land route to New York City, Trenton, and New England so with construction of the canal and railroads, it became a major center of transportation and an even more attractive location for industry.

By the 1880s, Bristol Borough was home to many factories, including companies manufacturing wall paper and carpet. In World War I, the Bristol Borough docks had sufficient space for a shipyard to construct twelve building slips for the construction of merchant vessels. In 1917 Averell Harriman organized the Bristol Borough shipyards founding the Merchant Shipbuilding Corporation (later called Merchant-Sterling) and given the U-boat menace, would land a contract to build 40 identical cargo ships for the war. The residential area that developed around the shipyards was soon named Harriman, Pennsylvania, and most of the housing built therein is still in use today. In 1922 Harriman was annexed by Bristol Borough. Most of the shipping was finished too late to enter World War I, but some of the shipyard's output was used post-war in relief and troop support missions. The majority of the contracts were canceled in 1919, and the ship yards rapidly became excess real estate. Between the two world wars, the eighty-acres of the shipyard were let out to various concerns, including one area converted to building amphibious planes—the flying boats technology which was the heart and soul of long-distance air travel until the technological advances theretofore the middle years of World War II. During World War II the old shipyards were used to build those and other airplanes, but most of the manufacturing in WW-II was not directly related to the war.

In 1961, Bristol Borough gained national attention when the song "Bristol Stomp", by The Dovells hit #2 on the Billboard pop chart. The song remains a local favorite, and it is often played at ceremonies, parades, and sporting events. The Merchant Shipbuilding site returned to the news in the 1990s when the Bucks County Redevelopment Authority using state and federal funding targeted the area as a priority for urban redevelopment.

Given its riverfront location, the old shipbuilding site was ranked highest in priority, and on 20 October 2000 various legislators and officials held a press conference at the former shipyard heralding the construction of the residential development already under way, known as the 'Riverfront North Project', and publicizing how derelict portions of the slipways were being removed. The project also established a park with four monuments celebrating the town's past in the redevelopment.

Today the preserved elements of the shipyard, and other buildings once important in Bristol Borough's past service are enshrined and celebrated in the Bristol Historic District, Bristol Industrial Historic District, and tourism sites celebrating the town's history and rich ethnic diversity. Various annual festivals, in particular keep a multi-ethnic cultural identity alive and well.

Historic sites in the town including the Delaware Division of the Pennsylvania Canal, Dorrance Mansion, General Stores and Mold Loft Building-Harriman Yard of the Merchant Shipbuilding Corporation, Grundy Mill Complex, Harriman Historic District, Jefferson Avenue School and Jefferson Land Association Historic District are listed on the National Register of Historic Places. The Delaware Division of the Pennsylvania Canal is also designated as a National Historic Landmark District.

In March 2023, there was a chemical spill in the Delaware River, caused by an equipment failure at the Trinseo chemical plant in Bristol.

== Demographics ==
Historical population
Census	Pop.	Note	%±
1800	511		—
1810	628		22.9%
1820	908		44.6%
1830	1,262		39.0%
1840	1,438		13.9%
1850	2,570		78.7%
1860	3,314		28.9%
1870	3,269		−1.4%
1880	5,273		61.3%
1890	6,553		24.3%
1900	7,104		8.4%
1910	9,256		30.3%
1920	10,273		11.0%
1930	11,799		14.9%
1940	11,895		0.8%
1950	12,710		6.9%
1960	12,364		−2.7%
1970	12,085		−2.3%
1980	10,867		−10.1%
1990	10,405		−4.3%
2000	9,923		−4.6%
2010	9,726		−2.0%
2020	9,861		1.4%

As of a 2014 estimate, the borough was 69.2% Non-Hispanic White, 16.4% Black or African American, 1.5% Native American and Alaskan Native, 0.2% Asian, 3.5% Some other race, and 3.4% were Two or more races. 15.0% of the population were of Hispanic or Latino ancestry

As of the 2010 census, the borough was 81.1 White, 9.5% Black or African American, 0.2% Native American, 0.6% Asian, and 3.5% were two or more races. 14.2% of the population were of Hispanic or Latino ancestry. There are 661 veterans living in Bristol Borough. There were 9,726 people, 4,237 households, and 3,926 families residing in the borough. The population density was 6,016.5 inhabitants per square mile (2,323.0/km^{2}). There were 4,207 housing units at an average density of 2,550.8 per square mile (984.9/km^{2}).

There were 4,004 households, out of which 28.0% had children under the age of 18 living with them, 39.7% were married couples living together, 15.9% had a female householder with no husband present, and 39.0% were non-families. 33.3% of all households were made up of individuals, and 14.3% had someone living alone who was 65 years of age or older. The average household size was 2.48 and the average family size was 3.20. In the borough the population was spread out, with 24.5% under the age of 18, 8.8% from 18 to 24, 30.5% from 25 to 44, 20.5% from 45 to 64, and 15.7% who were 65 years of age or older. The median age was 36 years. For every 100 females, there were 90.6 males. For every 100 females age 18 and over, there were 88.3 males.

The median income for a household in the borough in 2016 was $42,962. Males had a median income of $28,653 versus $19,278 for females. About 8.2% of families and 16% of the population were below the poverty line.

== Geography ==
Bristol Borough is located at 40°6′12″N 74°51′5″W (40.103382, -74.851448). According to the U.S. Census Bureau, the borough has a total area of 1.9 square miles (4.9 km^{2}), of which 1.6 square miles (4.1 km^{2}) is land and 0.2 square miles (0.52 km^{2}) (10.81%) is water.

== Education ==
The Bristol Borough School District comprises two public schools: Warren Snyder-John Girotti Elementary School (K-6) and Bristol High School (7–12). Other schooling opportunities in Bristol are offered through the Roman Catholic parish school of St. Mark Church (K-8), located in the borough. Conwell-Egan Roman Catholic School in Fairless Hills, Pennsylvania provides private/parochial schooling for children in grades 9–12. Higher education in Bristol Borough includes Pennco Tech.

== Climate ==
According to the Köppen climate classification system, Bristol has a humid subtropical climate (Cfa). Cfa climates are characterized by all months having an average mean temperature > 32.0 °F (0.0 °C), at least four months with an average mean temperature ≥ 50.0 °F (10.0 °C), at least one month with an average mean temperature ≥ 71.6 °F (22.0 °C) and no significant precipitation difference between seasons. Although most summer days are slightly humid in Bristol, episodes of heat and high humidity can occur with heat index values > 110 °F (43 °C). Since 1981, the highest air temperature was 103.1 °F (39.5 °C) on 07/06/2010, and the highest daily average mean dew point was 75.5 °F (24.2 °C) on 08/13/2016. The average wettest month is July which corresponds with the annual peak in thunderstorm activity. Since 1981, the wettest calendar day was 6.15 inches (156 mm) on 08/27/2011.

During the winter months, the average annual extreme minimum air temperature is 5.1 °F (−14.9 °C). Since 1981, the coldest air temperature was −5.8 °F (−21.0 °C) on 01/22/1984. Episodes of extreme cold and wind can occur with wind chill values < −5 °F (−21 °C). The average annual snowfall (Nov-Apr) is between 24 inches (61 cm) and 30 inches (76 cm). Ice storms and large snowstorms depositing ≥ 12 inches (30 cm) occur once every few years, particularly during nor’easters from December through February.

Climate data for Bristol. Elevation: 20 feet (6 m). 1981-2010 Averages (1981-2018 Records).
Month	Jan	Feb	Mar	Apr	May	Jun	Jul	Aug	Sep	Oct	Nov	Dec	Year
Record high °F (°C)	71.9 (22.2)	77.9 (25.5)	87.8 (31.0)	94.9 (34.9)	96.1 (35.6)	97.3 (36.3)	103.1 (39.5)	101.1 (38.4)	99.0 (37.2)	89.1 (31.7)	81.7 (27.6)	76.1 (24.5)	103.1 (39.5)
Mean daily maximum °F (°C)	40.8 (4.9)	44.0 (6.7)	52.0 (11.1)	64.0 (17.8)	73.5 (23.1)	82.7 (28.2)	86.8 (30.4)	85.2 (29.6)	78.5 (25.8)	67.2 (19.6)	56.4 (13.6)	45.2 (7.3)	64.8 (18.2)
Daily mean °F (°C)	32.6 (0.3)	35.0 (1.7)	42.2 (5.7)	52.9 (11.6)	62.1 (16.7)	71.6 (22.0)	76.2 (24.6)	74.8 (23.8)	67.7 (19.8)	56.3 (13.5)	46.7 (8.2)	36.9 (2.7)	54.7 (12.6)
Mean daily minimum °F (°C)	24.3 (−4.3)	26.0 (−3.3)	32.5 (0.3)	41.7 (5.4)	50.8 (10.4)	60.6 (15.9)	65.6 (18.7)	64.3 (17.9)	57.0 (13.9)	45.3 (7.4)	37.0 (2.8)	28.6 (−1.9)	44.6 (7.0)
Record low °F (°C)	−9.1 (−22.8)	−2.4 (−19.1)	4.4 (−15.3)	18.1 (−7.7)	32.8 (0.4)	42.1 (5.6)	48.3 (9.1)	43.1 (6.2)	36.7 (2.6)	25.6 (−3.6)	12.6 (−10.8)	0.5 (−17.5)	−9.1 (−22.8)
Average precipitation inches (mm)	3.60 (91)	2.71 (69)	4.29 (109)	3.83 (97)	4.18 (106)	4.18 (106)	4.97 (126)	4.37 (111)	3.99 (101)	3.70 (94)	3.40 (86)	3.90 (99)	47.12 (1,197)
Average relative humidity (%)	65.2	61.8	58.1	57.3	62.2	65.7	66.4	68.4	69.3	68.3	66.7	66.8	64.7
Average dew point °F (°C)	22.2 (−5.4)	23.2 (−4.9)	28.5 (−1.9)	38.2 (3.4)	49.0 (9.4)	59.5 (15.3)	64.2 (17.9)	63.7 (17.6)	57.3 (14.1)	46.0 (7.8)	36.2 (2.3)	26.9 (−2.8)	43.0 (6.1)
Source: PRISM Climate Group

== Transportation ==
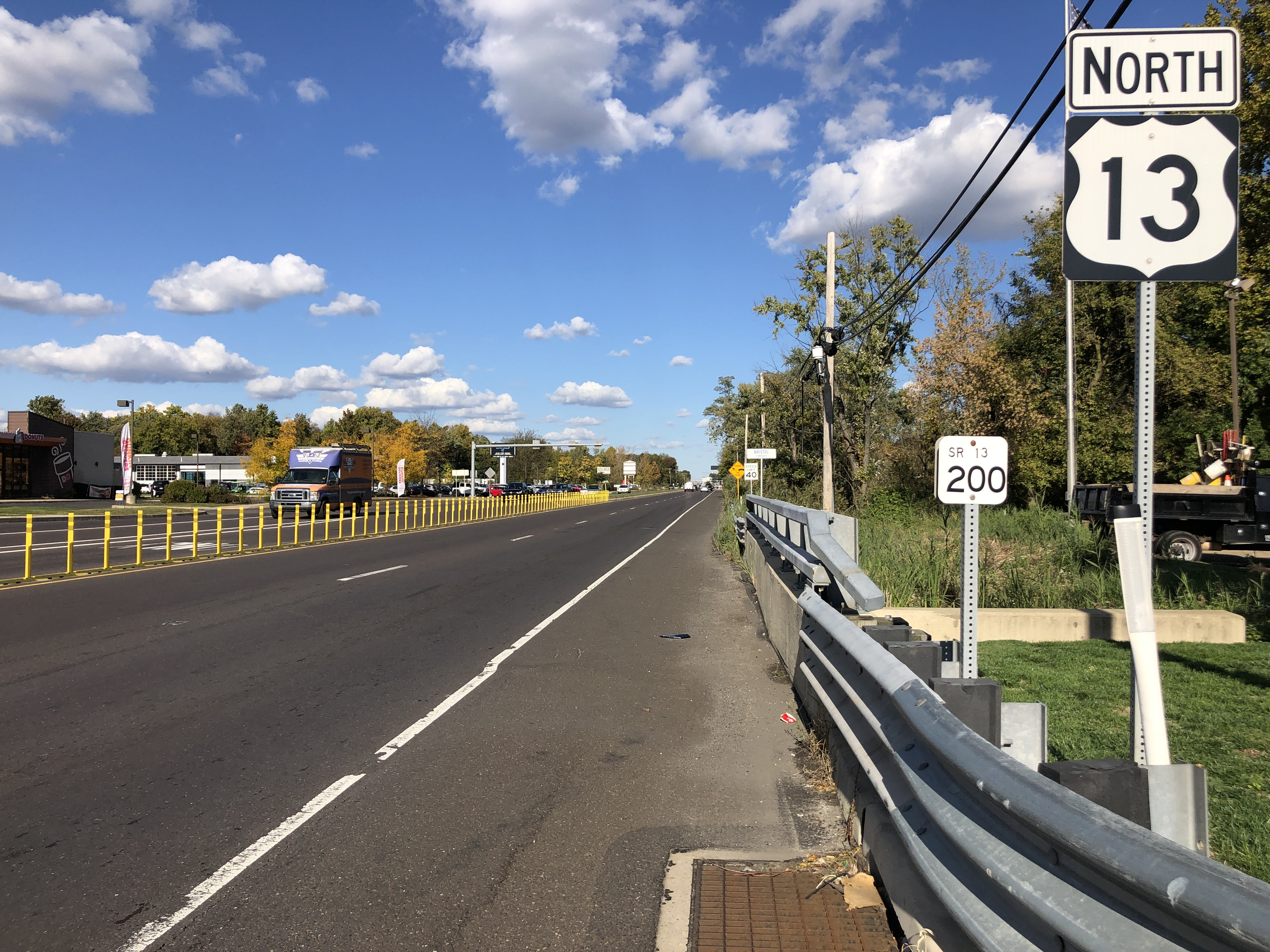
US Route 13 north in Bristol, October 2022

As of 2017 there were 27.31 miles (43.95 km) of public roads in Bristol, of which 6.17 miles (9.93 km) were maintained by the Pennsylvania Department of Transportation (PennDOT) and 21.14 miles (34.02 km) were maintained by the borough.

U.S. Route 13 passes southwest–northeast through Bristol on Bristol Pike, heading southwest toward Bensalem and Philadelphia and northeast toward Levittown and Trenton, New Jersey. US 13 connects to the Pennsylvania Turnpike (Interstate 95) at the Delaware Valley interchange north of Bristol, just west of the Delaware River–Turnpike Toll Bridge over the Delaware River that connects the Pennsylvania Turnpike to the New Jersey Turnpike. Pennsylvania Route 413 passes north–south along the western edge of Bristol, heading north on Veterans Highway toward Langhorne and south to the Burlington-Bristol Bridge over the Delaware River that leads to Burlington, New Jersey. PA 413 connects to Interstate 95 at an interchange north of Bristol.

The Bristol station is served by SEPTA Regional Rail's Trenton Line that provides service between Center City Philadelphia and the Trenton Transit Center. Trains along Amtrak's Northeast Corridor pass through Bristol but do not stop; the nearest Amtrak station is in Trenton. SEPTA provides Suburban Bus service to Bristol along Route 128, which runs between the Neshaminy Mall and the Oxford Valley Mall, and Route 129, which runs between the Frankford and Knights Bus Loop in Northeast Philadelphia and the Oxford Valley Mall. TMA Bucks operates the Bristol Rushbus, which offers peak-hour shuttles between a connection with the Trenton Line train at the Bristol station and certain businesses in Bristol.

== Ecology ==
According to the A. W. Kuchler, among U.S. potential natural vegetation types, Bristol has a dominant vegetation type of Appalachian Oak (104) with a dominant vegetation form of Eastern Hardwood Forest (25). The plant hardiness zone is 7b with an average annual extreme minimum air temperature of 5.1 °F (−14.9 °C). The spring bloom typically begins by April 7 and fall color usually peaks by November 4.

== Notable people ==
- Poul Anderson, science fiction writer
- Daniel W. Bursch, astronaut
- John F. Cordisco, former State Representative and Bucks County Democratic Committee Chairman
- Tony DiStefano, former professional motocross racer
- John Thompson Dorrance, chemist and inventor of condensed soup
- Ileen Getz, actress, 3rd Rock from the Sun
- Joseph R. Grundy, textile manufacturer and U.S. Senator
- William Edward Hanford, chemist
- Lauren Holly, actress
- Eddie James, convicted murderer executed in Florida
- Jeff Manto, professional baseball player
- Joe McEwing, professional baseball player
- Joseph McIlvaine, U.S. Senator
- David Miscavige, leader of the Church of Scientology
- Mike Missanelli, Philadelphia sports personality
- William Rodman, U.S. Congressman
- Ryan Samsel, arrested for his participation in the January 6 United States Capitol attack
- Charlie Saxton, actor
- Will Thomas, novelist
- David Todd, record promoter and producer
- Joanna Fox Waddill, American Civil War nurse known as the Florence Nightingale of the Confederacy
- Todd Weiner, professional football player

== See also ==
- Burlington-Bristol Bridge

== Bibliography ==
- Harold Mitchener & Carol Houser-Mitchener, Images of America : Bristol; Arcadia Publishing, 2000; 128 pages; ISBN 978-0-7385-0427-8
