= King George II Inn =

Hotel in Bristol, Pennsylvania, United States

Coordinates: 40.0945°N 74.8568°W

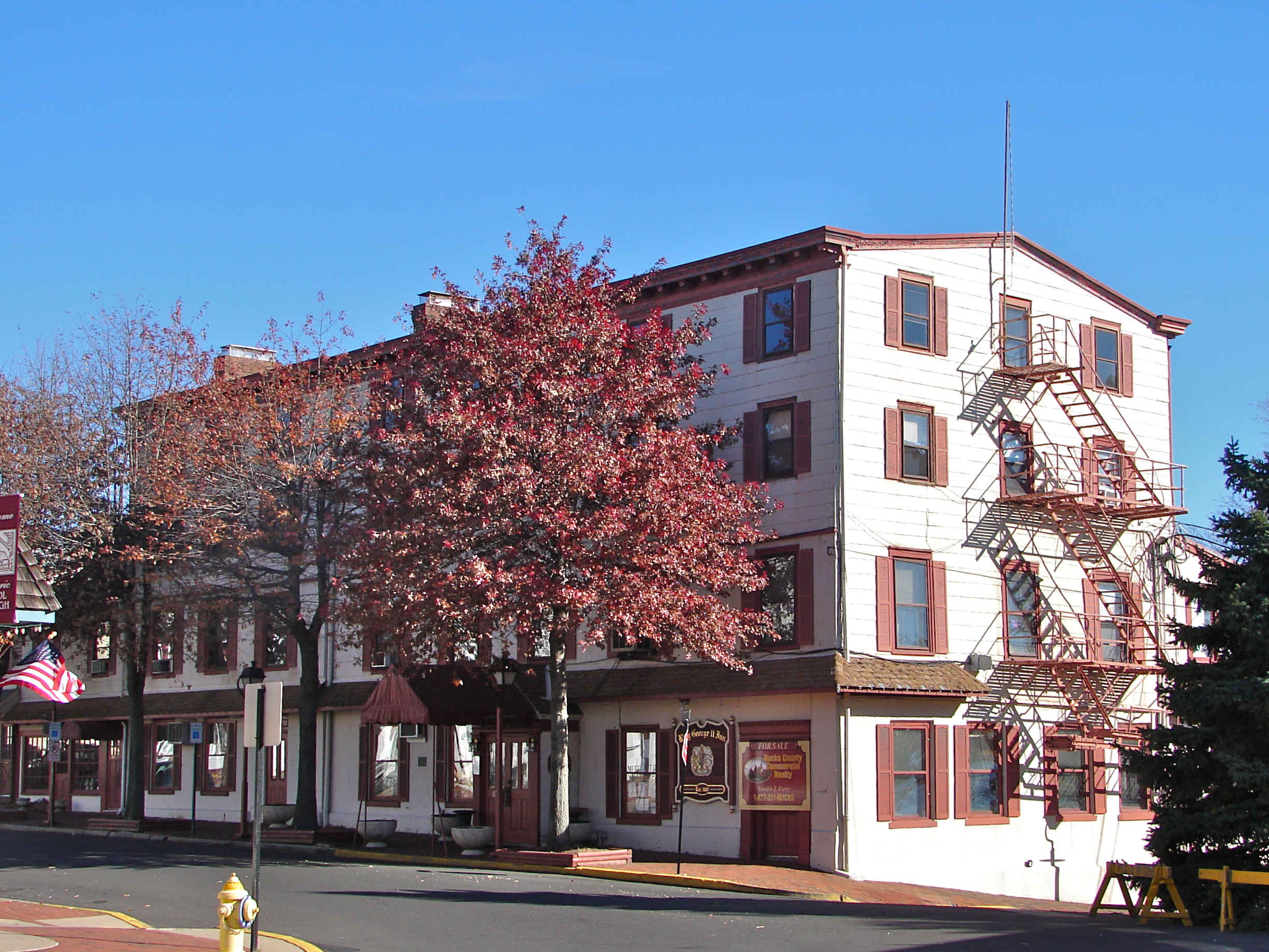
- King George Inn in November 2010
- Industry: Lodging, Restaurant
- Founded: 1681
- Headquarters: Bristol, Pennsylvania, U.S.
- Key people: Samuel Clift
- Number of employees: approx 25-50
- Website: Official website

The King George II Inn, located in Bristol, Pennsylvania and was first established in 1681 as the Ferry House by Samuel Clift. The inn was a main stopping point on the road from New York to Philadelphia. The inn overlooks the Delaware River and is located at the corner of Radcliffe and Mill Streets in the Bristol Historic District.

== Background ==
Samuel Clift obtained from Sir Edmund Andros, Provincial Governor of New York, a grant of 262 acres (106 ha) for a plantation across the river from Burlington, New Jersey, the site of Bristol in Pennsylvania. Clift established the ferry service between the Pennsylvania and New Jersey settlements and built an inn in Bristol to service the ferry business. In 1682 Samuel deeded his land and ferry to his son-in-law Joseph English, Jr.

Clift built the Ferry House as part of his operation taking people across the Delaware River. The property was leased by Michael Hurst in 1684 and was subsequently opened as an inn by Thomas Brook in 1705. The inn was purchased by Charles Besonett in 1735 who subsequently rebuilt the inn larger following a fire on the property. The inn was renamed named the King George II Inn in 1765.

As George Washington's army approached Bucks County in 1781, the image of George II was replaced with a likeness of General Washington. Shortly afterwards, the inn was renamed the Fountain House. During the 1800s, Bristol was a popular resort and spa, and the inn catered to the travelers. In 1892, the inn was renamed Ye Olde Delaware House. The Mundy family purchased the inn in the mid 1950s and operated it as The Ye Olde Delaware House. Local businessman Francis O'Boyle bought the Inn in the early 1970s and reclaimed the name King George II Inn after renovations. The O'Boyle family sold it in the early 1980s after Francis' death.

The restaurant closed in 2010, and opened again less than a year later in 2011. The Inn came under its current ownership in 2015.

== See also ==
- King's Highway (Charleston to Boston)
- Washington-Rochambeau Revolutionary Route
- McGillin's Olde Ale House
