= General Stores and Mold Loft Building-Harriman Yard of the Merchant Shipbuilding Corporation =

- U.S. National Register of Historic Places
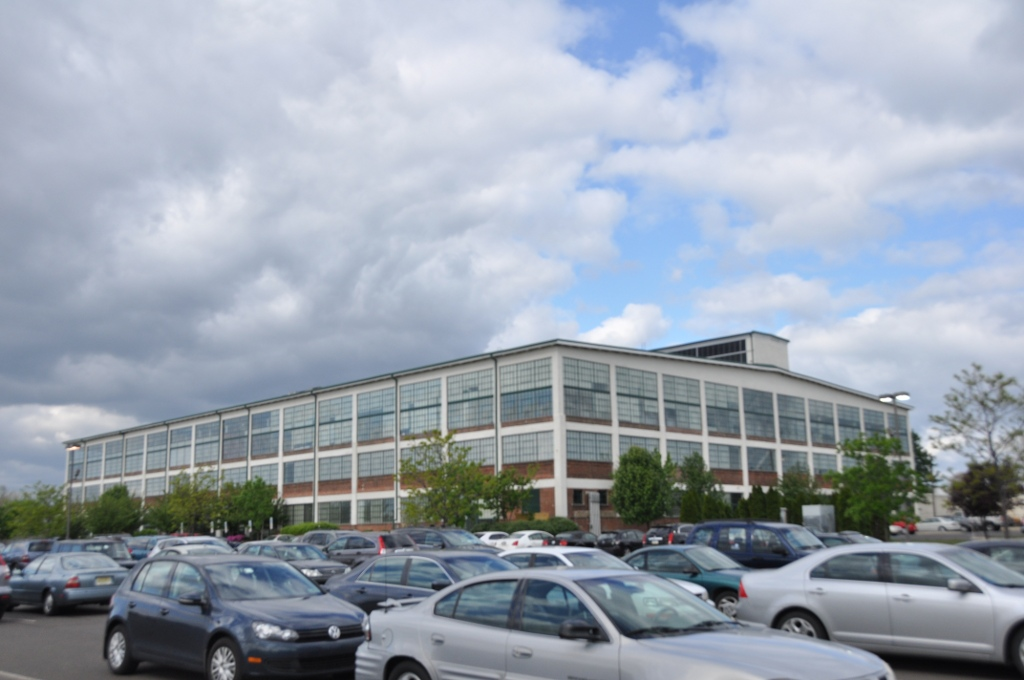
- General Stores and Mold Loft Building-Harriman Yard of the Merchant Shipbuilding Corporation, 2012

- Location within Pennsylvania Location within the United States
- Location: 1414 Radcliffe St., Bristol, Pennsylvania
- Coordinates: 40°6′12″N 74°50′31″W
- Area: 1.8 acres (0.73 ha)
- Built: 1917
- Built by: Ley, Fred T., & Company
- NRHP reference No.: 03000722
- Added to NRHP: July 31, 2003

General Stores and Mold Loft Building-Harriman Yard of the Merchant Shipbuilding Corporation, also known as Manhattan Soap Company Warehouse, is a historic warehouse located at Bristol, Bucks County, Pennsylvania. It was built in 1917, and is a three-story, rectangular reinforced concrete building. The warehouse building was one of a complex of approximately 30 buildings constructed by the Merchant Shipbuilding Corporation at Harriman Yard during World War I. In 1925, it was acquired by the Manhattan Soap Company, which was acquired by the Purex Corporation in 1956. It was later used as a manufacturing facility for Dial soap until 2000.

It was added to the National Register of Historic Places in 2003.
