= Samuel Clift =

English settler in Pennsylvania (c. 1610–1683)

Samuel Clift (ca. 1610 - 1683) was an early English settler in the Province of Pennsylvania.

== Background ==
Clift obtained a grant of 262 acres (106 ha) from Edmund Andros, Provincial Governor of New York, for a plantation across the river from Burlington, New Jersey. Clift established the ferry service between Bristol in Pennsylvania and the New Jersey settlements. He built the King George II Inn in Bristol to service the ferry business. In 1682 he deeded his land and ferry to his son-in-law Joseph English Jr.

He died in 1683.
