= Grundy Mill Complex =

- U.S. National Register of Historic Places
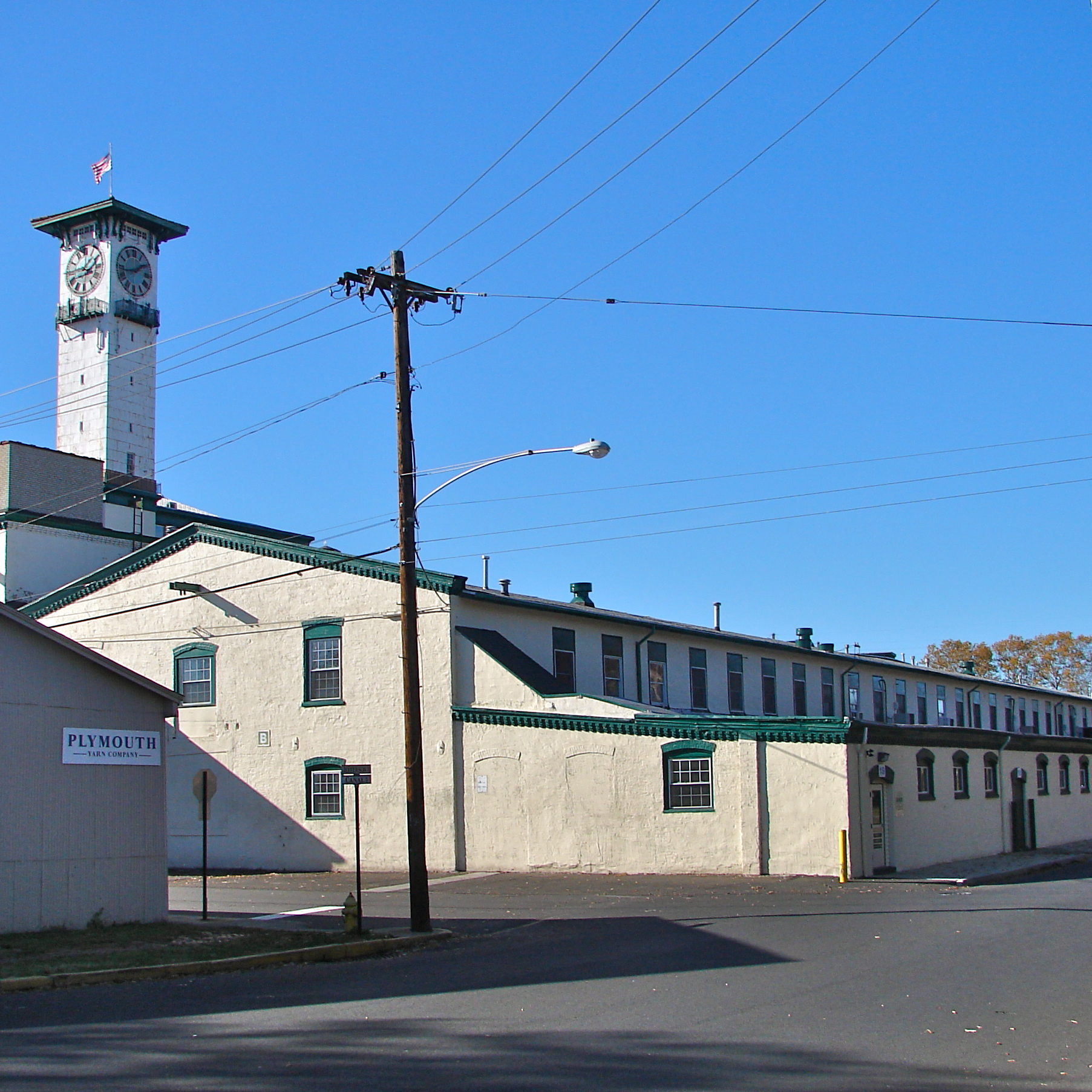
- Grundy Mill, November 2010

- Location within Pennsylvania Location within the United States
- Location: W corner of Jefferson Ave. and Canal St., Bristol, Pennsylvania
- Coordinates: 40°6′15″N 74°51′8″W
- Area: 4 acres (1.6 ha)
- Built: 1876
- Architects: J. Linden Heacock, Oscar Hokansen
- NRHP reference No.: 86000013
- Added to NRHP: January 9, 1986

The Grundy Mills Complex or Bristol Worsted Mills, which is located in Bristol, Bucks County, Pennsylvania, includes thirteen textile mill buildings that were erected by the William H. Grundy Co. between 1876 and 1930.

This complex was added to the National Register of Historic Places in 1986.

== History and architectural features ==
Built by the William H. Grundy Co. between 1876 and 1930, the thirteen buildings of the historic Grundy Mills Complex were initially home to the company's textile manufacturing operations.

The complex subsequently operated as a worsted mill until 1946. Added to the National Register of Historic Places in 1986, it is still used for industrial operations.

The clock tower, which was built in 1911 and is 168 feet (51 m) tall, was the subject of a 2017 painting by Jean-Marc Dubus, an immigrant from Nice, France, and current resident of Langhorne, Pennsylvania. The painting is on display at the Centre for the Arts in Bristol.

Other buildings in the complex range from one to seven stories tall. The largest structures, which were built between 1900 and 1915, include the warehouse, the powerhouse and the clock tower. Monumental in scale, they can be seen from well outside of the town.

In 1920, more than eight hundred and fifty workers were employed in the plant; at that time, it was the largest employer in Bucks County.

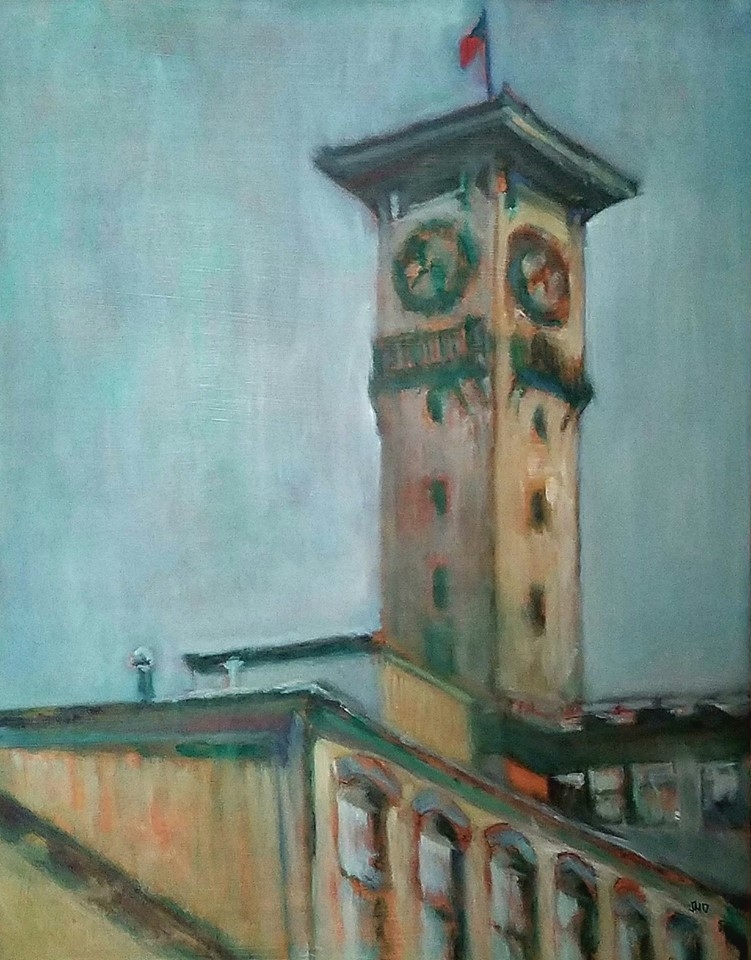
Grundy Mill Complex Clock Tower Painting

Delaware Canal and Clock Tower
