= Joanna Fox Waddill =

American civil war nurse (1838–1899)

Joanna Painter (Fox) Waddill (September 24, 1838 – January 3, 1899) was a nurse assisting wounded and ill Confederate soldiers during the American Civil War. She was celebrated as the "Florence Nightingale of the Confederacy" for her humanitarianism.

== Life ==
Joanna Fox was born in Bristol, Pennsylvania, to James C. Fox and his wife Catherine Bessonett. Fox was a brickmason who moved his family to the Mississippi River port city of Natchez, Mississippi, when Joanna was a baby.

Fox was 22 years old, when the Civil War erupted in early 1861. She and two other Natchez ladies traveled to the frontlines to serve as volunteer nurses in places such as Mississippi, Alabama, Georgia, and Tennessee. When the Union Navy captured Natchez as they advanced toward Vicksburg, Mississippi, Fox hid a Confederate flag under her petticoat to prevent its capture.

Near the end of the war, Fox became the matron of the Confederate hospital in Meridian, Mississippi. There, she met Louisiana druggist George D. Waddill while they both tended to sick and dying Confederate soldiers. The couple were married in Lauderdale, Mississippi (near Corinth) on September 26, 1864.

The couple then moved to Baton Rouge, Louisiana, where they operated a drugstore for many years. She became active in the Confederate Memorial Association and other societies.

The Joanna Waddill Camp #294 of the Daughters of the Confederacy is named in her honor, which is active in local Civil War memorialization.
