= John Thompson Dorrance =

American chemist and businessman (1873-1930)

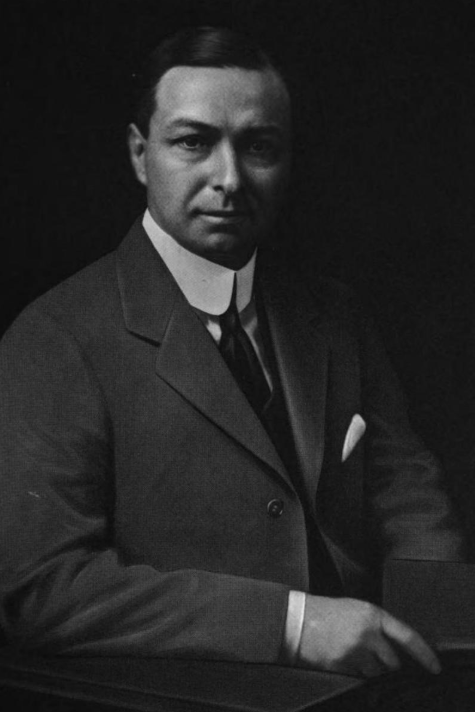
- Dorrance c. 1919
- Born: November 11, 1873; Bristol, Pennsylvania, U.S.
- Died: September 21, 1930 (aged 56); Cinnaminson Township, New Jersey, U.S.
- Resting place: West Laurel Hill Cemetery, Bala Cynwyd, Pennsylvania, U.S.
- Education: Massachusetts Institute of Technology (BS); University of Göttingen (PhD)
- Occupations: Chemist, businessman President & owner, Campbell's
- Spouse: Ethel Mallinckrodt
- Children: 5
- Relatives: John Dorrance III (grandson); Mary Alice Dorrance Malone (granddaughter); George W. Strawbridge Jr. (grandson); Dorrance Hill Hamilton (granddaughter)

John Thompson Dorrance (November 11, 1873 – September 21, 1930) was an American chemist and businessman who developed commercially viable condensed soup. He was president of Campbell's from 1914 to 1930, having purchased sole ownership from the Campbell family in 1915. At the time of his death, he possessed a fortune worth an estimated $120 million (approximately $1.79 billion in 2024 dollars).

== Early life and education ==
John Thompson Dorrance was born November 11, 1873 in Bristol, Pennsylvania to John Sr. and Eleanor (née Thompson) Dorrance. His father was a prominent local businessman and politician, and he was raised at the Dorrance Mansion.

He attended the Rugby Academy in Philadelphia and received a Bachelor of Science degree from the Massachusetts Institute of Technology in 1895. While at MIT, he was a member of the Sigma Alpha Epsilon fraternity.

In 1897, he graduated with a Ph.D. from the University of Göttingen. He worked in several restaurants in Paris, where he learned about soup flavorings and had the idea to prepare and package soup in condensed form.

== Career ==
In 1897, after declining offers to teach chemistry at Göttingen, Bryn Mawr College, Columbia University, and Cornell University, Dorrance chose a job as a chemist with the Joseph Campbell Preserve Company, which was founded by Joseph A. Campbell and headed at the time by his uncle, Arthur Dorrance. At the time, Campbell was a relatively small concern packing preserves, jams, jellies, and preserved vegetables.

In 1899, Dorrance implemented his idea to condense soup, producing the first batch using an improved process which maintained its flavor and nutrient content but, by reducing the water content, reduced the weight and bulk of the soup, therefore saving significantly on container sizes and shipping costs. Due to these costs savings, Campbells was able to lower the price of their soups from 34 cents to 10 cents. Campbell's condensed soup was immediately popular, revolutionizing household economics throughout the United States.

In 1900, Dorrance was promoted to director and vice-president, and in 1914, he became president and general manager. In 1915, Dorrance bought out the Campbell family and became sole owner of the company. He also led the acquisition of Franco-American Food Company in that same year, which added canned spaghetti, pasta, and sauces to Campbell's offerings. In addition to his work on condensed soup, Dorrance experimented in scientific agriculture and husbandry, dedicating his attention to improving varieties of fruits and vegetables. He had conservatories and gardens at his home, Pomona Farm, in Cinnaminson, New Jersey.

In 1917, he was nominated by President Herbert Hoover for a position in the United States Food Administration.

In 1921, the Joseph Campbell Company was restructured as Campbell's Soup Company by dissolving the original company and selling shares for $1 to its successor. In 1923, the Campbell Sales Company, a subsidiary, was formed to manage the marketing and sales of Campbell's soup.

In addition to his control of Campbell's, Dorrance was elected to the board of directors of several other businesses, including the National Bank of Commerce in New York, the National State Bank of Camden, the Atlantic City Railroad, the Pennsylvania Railroad, the Port Reading Railroad, the Old Colony Trust Company of Boston, the Prudential Life and Insurance Company of America, and the West Jersey and Seashore Railroad.

== Personal life and death ==
Dorrance was a member of the American Association for the Advancement of Science, the American Chemical Society, the French Legion of Honour, and the Historical Society of Pennsylvania. He was also a life member of the Manufacturers Club of Philadelphia, the University Club of Philadelphia, and the Racquet Club of Philadelphia, and a member of the Philadelphia Pen and Pencil Club and the Downtown Club. Outside of Philadelphia, he was a member of Baltimore Country Club, the New York Yacht Club, the Midday Club of New York, the Technology Club of New York, Seaview Golf Club in Absecon, and Riverton Country Club in Riverton.

=== Family ===
He married Ethel Mallinckrodt on August 18, 1906, in Baltimore, Maryland, and they had five children:

- Elinor Dorrance (born November 12, 1908);
- Ethel Mallinckrodt Dorrance (born July 17, 1909);
- Charlotte Kelsey Dorrance (born November 10, 1911);
- Margaret Winifred Dorrance (born October18, 1915); and
- John Dorrance Jr. (born February 7, 1919).

His notable grandchildren have included John Dorrance III, Mary Alice Dorrance Malone, George W. Strawbridge Jr., and Dorrance Hill Hamilton.

=== Death ===
Dorrance died on September 21, 1930, of heart disease at his home in Cinnaminson Township, New Jersey. He was interred in West Laurel Hill Cemetery in Bala Cynwyd, Pennsylvania.

He left an estate worth an estimated $120 million (approximately $1.79 billion in 2024 dollars) after his death. There was significant litigation over his domicile for purposes of estate and inheritance tax, with both the Supreme Court of Pennsylvania and the Supreme Court of New Jersey holding that he was domiciled in their respective state, and his estate was required to pay estate tax to both states. The estate sought relief by appealing to the Supreme Court of the United States, but the request for review was denied.

==== Legacy ====
In 2012, Dorrance was elected into the New Jersey Hall of Fame.

His estate in Radnor Township, Pennsylvania is now the home of Cabrini University.

== See also ==
- Dorrance Mansion
