= John Dorrance III =

American-born Irish billionaire

- Born: 1943 or 1944 (age 81–82); US
- Occupation: Heir
- Known for: Campbell's Soup heir
- Children: 2 sons
- Relatives: John Thompson Dorrance (grandfather)

John Dorrance III (born 1943/1944) is an American-born Irish billionaire businessman and heir to Campbell's Soup. In November 1996, Dorrance sold his company shares worth $720 million. He is also known as "Ippy" Dorrance.

== Early life ==
He is the son of John T. "Jack" Dorrance Jr. (1919–1989) and grandson of John Thompson Dorrance.

== Career ==
As of September 2024, Forbes estimated his net worth at US$2.6 billion.

== Personal life ==
For 15 years he lived on a ranch in Wyoming before moving to Ireland, where he gained citizenship in 1995.

He is married with two children and lives in Dublin.
