= National Register of Historic Places listings in Bucks County, Pennsylvania =

Location of Bucks County in Pennsylvania

This is a list of the National Register of Historic Places listings in Bucks County, Pennsylvania.

This is intended to be a complete list of the properties and districts on National Register of Historic Places in Bucks County, Pennsylvania. The locations of National Register properties and districts for which the latitude and longitude coordinates are included below, may be seen in a map.

There are 167 properties and districts listed on the National Register in the county, including 12 National Historic Landmarks. Another 6 sites were once listed on the Register but have since been removed.

This National Park Service list is complete through NPS recent listings posted November 6, 2026.

== Current listings ==
	Name on the Register	Image	Date listed	Location	City or town	Description
1	Andalusia	Andalusia	November 13, 1966 (#66000649)	1.4 miles (2.3 km) north of Philadelphia on U.S. Route 13; 40°03′53″N 74°57′31″W	Bensalem Township	1794 estate, modified several times later, was home to Nicholas Biddle
2	Atkinson Road Bridge	Atkinson Road Bridge	March 20, 2002 (#02000222)	Atkinson Road and Pidcock's Creek; 40°19′38″N 74°58′44″W	Solebury Township	
3	Belmont	Belmont	May 3, 1988 (#88000460)	3779 Bristol Road; 40°08′27″N 74°57′05″W	Bensalem Township	
4	Wycombe Stone Bridge	Wycombe Stone Bridge	June 22, 1988 (#88000786)	Forest Grove Road over Mill Creek; 40°16′53″N 75°01′19″W	Buckingham Township	
5	Carversville Stone Bridge	Carversville Stone Bridge	June 22, 1988 (#88000783)	Carversville Road over Paunacussing Creek; 40°23′09″N 75°03′50″W	Carversville	
6	Bridge in Tinicum Township	Bridge in Tinicum Township	June 22, 1988 (#88000814)	Legislative Route 920 over Pennsylvania Canal; 40°25′24″N 75°03′55″W	Tinicum Township	Also known as the Byram Road Bridge
7	Bridge in Yardley Borough	Bridge in Yardley Borough	June 22, 1988 (#88000770)	Reading Avenue over VanHorn Creek; 40°14′03″N 74°50′02″W	Yardley	
8	Bridge Valley Bridge	Bridge Valley Bridge	May 10, 1984 (#84003120)	Spans Neshaminy Creek north of Jamison; 40°16′34″N 75°05′01″W	Warwick Township	
9	Bristol Historic District	Bristol Historic District	April 30, 1987 (#87000665)	Roughly bounded by Pond, Cedar, E. Lincoln Streets, the Delaware River, and E. Mill Street; 40°05′53″N 74°51′10″W	Bristol	
10	Bristol Industrial Historic District	Bristol Industrial Historic District	November 16, 1987 (#87002016)	Roughly bounded by Pennsylvania Canal, Jefferson Avenue, Canal Street, Pennsylvania Railroad and Beaver Street; 40°06′07″N 74°51′15″W	Bristol	
11	Bristol Railroad Station	Bristol Railroad Station	August 15, 2025 (#100012144)	40°06′18″N 74°51′17″W	Bristol	
12	Brownsburg Village Historic District	Brownsburg Village Historic District	May 26, 1994 (#94000445)	Junction of River and Brownsburg Rds. 40°19′07″N 74°55′12″W	Upper Makefield Township	
13	Buckingham Friends Meeting House	Buckingham Friends Meeting House	March 28, 1997 (#97000291)	5684 Lower York Road; 40°20′56″N 75°02′27″W	Buckingham Township	
14	Buckmanville Historic District	Buckmanville Historic District	March 20, 2002 (#02000224)	Street Road between Windy Bush and Buckmanville Roads; 40°18′51″N 74°58′33″W	Upper Makefield Township	
15	John Burroughs Homestead	John Burroughs Homestead	March 5, 1984 (#84003163)	Wrightstown-Taylorsville Road; 40°17′04″N 74°54′02″W	Upper Makefield Township	
16	Byecroft Farm Complex	Byecroft Farm Complex	September 9, 1983 (#83002219)	Off U.S. Route 202; 40°20′13″N 75°02′20″W	Buckingham Township	
17	Cabin Run Covered Bridge	Cabin Run Covered Bridge	December 1, 1980 (#80003443)	South of Tinicum on Legislative Route 09099; 40°14′33″N 75°06′45″W	Plumstead Township	
18	Campbell's Bridge	Campbell's Bridge	June 22, 1988 (#88000733)	Allentown Road over Unami Creek; 40°25′42″N 75°23′54″W	Milford Township	Replaced in 2005
19	Carversville Historic District	Carversville Historic District	December 13, 1978 (#78003418)	Off Pennsylvania Route 32; 40°23′09″N 75°03′35″W	Solebury Township	
20	Center Bridge Historic District	Center Bridge Historic District	March 26, 1985 (#85000673)	Bounded by Ely and Laurel Roads on River Road; 40°24′02″N 74°58′48″W	Solebury Township	
21	Chalfont Historic District	Chalfont Historic District	December 18, 2006 (#06001148)	Roughly bounded by Chestnut Street Park Avenue, Main Street, Butler Avenue and Sunset Avenue; 40°17′25″N 75°12′38″W	Chalfont	
22	John Chapman House	John Chapman House	January 24, 1974 (#74001757)	South of New Hope off Pennsylvania Route 232 on Eagle Road; 40°18′46″N 74°56′57″W	Upper Makefield Township	
23	Churchville Historic District	Churchville Historic District	July 21, 1995 (#95000887)	Roughly along Bristol Road, Bustleton Pike and Cornell and Knowles Avenues, in Northampton and Upper Southampton Townships; 40°10′56″N 75°00′49″W	Northampton and Upper Southampton Townships	
24	Gershom Craft House	Gershom Craft House	October 16, 1986 (#86002892)	105 Barnsley Avenue; 40°12′08″N 74°47′25″W	Morrisville	
25	Craven Hall	Craven Hall	October 11, 2007 (#07001078)	599 Newtown Road; 40°11′29″N 75°04′26″W	Warminster Township	
26	Cuttalossa Valley Historic District	Cuttalossa Valley Historic District	June 27, 2002 (#02000705)	Cuttalossa Road from Sugan Road to the Delaware River; 40°23′38″N 75°01′26″W	Solebury Township	
27	Delaware Division of the Pennsylvania Canal	Delaware Division of the Pennsylvania Canal	October 29, 1974 (#74001756)	Parallels the west bank of the Delaware River from Easton to Bristol; 40°05′36″N 74°51′27″W	Bristol	Extends into Northampton County
28	Delbar Products, Inc.	Delbar Products, Inc.	April 26, 2018 (#100002369)	601 Spruce St. 40°22′10″N 75°17′48″W	Perkasie	
29	Dolington Village Historic District	Dolington Village Historic District	May 26, 1994 (#94000444)	Junction of Pennsylvania Route 532 and Mt. Eyre Road (Washington Crossing Road); 40°15′58″N 74°53′46″W	Lower and Upper Makefield Townships	
30	Dorrance Mansion	Dorrance Mansion	October 16, 1986 (#86002891)	300 Radcliffe Street; 40°05′45″N 74°51′15″W	Bristol	
31	Doylestown Historic District	Doylestown Historic District	May 10, 1985 (#85001012)	Roughly bounded by Union, Cottage and E. Ashland Streets, Hillside Avenue and S. and N. West Streets; 40°18′35″N 75°08′14″W	Doylestown	
32	Pugh Dungan House	Pugh Dungan House	March 20, 1980 (#80003430)	33 W. Court Street; 40°18′37″N 75°07′54″W	Doylestown	
33	Durham Mill and Furnace	Durham Mill and Furnace	November 21, 1976 (#76001608)	Durham Road; 40°34′35″N 75°13′27″W	Durham Township	
34	Dyerstown Historic District	Dyerstown Historic District	January 15, 1987 (#86003574)	Along Old Easton Road near the junction of Stony Lane; 40°20′28″N 75°07′34″W	Plumstead Township	
35	Eagle Tavern	Eagle Tavern	April 20, 1978 (#78002353)	South of New Hope; 40°17′29″N 74°56′24″W	Upper Makefield Township	
36	John Eakin Farm	John Eakin Farm	February 24, 2005 (#05000100)	3298 Pennsylvania Route 212, Main Street, Springtown; 40°33′05″N 75°16′57″W	Springfield Township	
37	Edgemont	Edgemont	December 16, 1977 (#77001126)	North of Langhorne on Bridgetown Road; 40°11′30″N 74°55′25″W	Middletown Township	
38	Otto Eisenlohr and Bros Cigar Factory	Otto Eisenlohr and Bros Cigar Factory	July 26, 2024 (#100010584)	35 Maple Ave. 40°21′32″N 75°18′42″W	Sellersville	
39	Joshua Ely House	Joshua Ely House	March 6, 1985 (#85000463)	Rittenhouse Circle; 40°21′21″N 74°57′30″W	New Hope	
40	Erwinna Covered Bridge	Erwinna Covered Bridge	December 1, 1980 (#80003434)	North of Erwinna on Legislative Route 09098; 40°30′09″N 75°04′29″W	Erwinna	
41	Fallsington Historic District	Fallsington Historic District	June 19, 1972 (#72001099)	South of U.S. Route 1, east of New Tyburn Road; 40°11′12″N 74°49′10″W	Falls Township	
42	Fonthill	Fonthill	June 1, 1972 (#72001094)	E. Court Street at the intersection of Pennsylvania Route 313; 40°19′16″N 75°07′26″W	Doylestown	
43	Fonthill, Mercer Museum and Moravian Pottery and Tile Works	Fonthill, Mercer Museum and Moravian Pottery and Tile Works	February 4, 1985 (#85002366)	Court Street and Swamp Road and Pine and Ashland Streets; 40°19′01″N 75°07′30″W	Doylestown	
44	Fordhook Farm	Fordhook Farm	April 30, 1987 (#87000674)	105 New Britain Road; 40°17′52″N 75°09′01″W	Doylestown Township	
45	Forest Grove Historic District	Forest Grove Historic District	April 20, 1982 (#82003765)	Forest Grove and Lower Mountain Roads; 40°17′34″N 75°03′39″W	Buckingham Township	
46	Fountain House	Fountain House	March 16, 1972 (#72001095)	State and Main Streets; 40°18′36″N 75°07′51″W	Doylestown	
47	Frankenfield Covered Bridge	Frankenfield Covered Bridge	December 1, 1980 (#80003444)	North of Tinicum on Township 421; 40°28′32″N 75°05′59″W	Tinicum Township	
48	John and Alice Fullam House	John and Alice Fullam House	March 15, 2019 (#100003519)	372 Brownsburg Rd. 40°16′59″N 74°58′12″W	Wrightstown Township	
49	Jacob Funk House and Barn	Jacob Funk House and Barn	February 7, 2007 (#07000030)	3609 Pennsylvania Route 212; 40°33′32″N 75°16′04″W	Springfield Township	
50	Gardenville-North Branch Rural Historic District	Gardenville-North Branch Rural Historic District	November 7, 1991 (#91000954)	Roughly bounded by Durham Road, Point Pleasant Pike, Valley Park Road and North Branch Neshaminy Creek; 40°22′35″N 75°06′57″W	Plumstead Township	
51	General Stores and Mold Loft Building-Harriman Yard of the Merchant Shipbuilding Corporation	General Stores and Mold Loft Building-Harriman Yard of the Merchant Shipbuilding Corporation	July 31, 2003 (#03000722)	1414 Radcliffe Street; 40°06′15″N 74°50′29″W	Bristol	
52	Thomas and Lydia Gilbert Farm	Thomas and Lydia Gilbert Farm	May 5, 1989 (#89000351)	5042 Anderson Road; 40°20′14″N 75°03′36″W	Buckingham Township	
53	Green Hills Farm	Green Hills Farm	February 27, 1974 (#74001755)	Southwest of Dublin on Dublin Road; 40°21′36″N 75°13′11″W	Hilltown Township	
54	Grundy Mill Complex	Grundy Mill Complex	January 9, 1986 (#86000013)	Western corner of Jefferson Avenue and Canal Street; 40°06′15″N 74°51′08″W	Bristol	
55	Half-Moon Inn	Half-Moon Inn	December 6, 1977 (#77001128)	101 and 105 Court Street; 40°13′40″N 74°56′11″W	Newtown	
56	Oscar Hammerstein II Farm	Oscar Hammerstein II Farm	November 17, 1988 (#88002374)	70 East Road; 40°18′35″N 75°06′45″W	Doylestown	
57	Hampton Hill	Hampton Hill	April 2, 1973 (#73001594)	1269 Second Street Pike; 40°13′25″N 75°00′34″W	Northampton Township	
58	Harewood and Beechwood	Harewood and Beechwood	February 1, 1980 (#80003436)	East of Langhorne off Pennsylvania Route 213; 40°10′43″N 74°54′45″W	Middletown Township	
59	Harriman Historic District	Harriman Historic District	April 30, 1987 (#87000673)	Roughly bounded by Trenton Avenue, Cleveland and McKinley Streets, Farragut Avenue, and West Circle; 40°06′29″N 74°50′42″W	Bristol	Neighborhood mostly built to house workers at nearby shipyard during World War I
60	Hayhurst Farm	Hayhurst Farm	February 12, 1974 (#74001759)	Northeast of Wrightstown on Eagle Road; 40°17′24″N 74°56′43″W	Upper Makefield Township	
61	Highland Park Camp Meeting	Highland Park Camp Meeting	April 10, 2017 (#100000854)	415 Highland Park Rd. 40°20′47″N 75°18′10″W	West Rockhill Township	
62	Holicong Village Historic District	Holicong Village Historic District	March 20, 1980 (#80003435)	U.S. Route 202 and Holicong Road; 40°20′09″N 75°02′55″W	Buckingham Township	
63	Honey Hollow Watershed	Honey Hollow Watershed	August 4, 1969 (#69000155)	2.5 miles (4.0 km) south of the Delaware River on Pennsylvania Route 263; 40°22′11″N 75°20′45″W	New Hope	
64	John and Phineas Hough House	John and Phineas Hough House	December 24, 1992 (#92001721)	20 Moyer Road; 40°13′43″N 74°50′01″W	Lower Makefield Township	
65	Hulmeville Historic District	Hulmeville Historic District	July 17, 1986 (#86001677)	2-4 Beaver Street, 946-1101 Bellevue Avenue, 1-111 Green, 4 Hulme, 3-342 Main Streets, 1-131 Trenton Avenue, and 2-9 Water Street; 40°08′34″N 74°54′35″W	Hulmeville	
66	Ivyland Historic District	Ivyland Historic District	March 21, 2002 (#02000225)	Bounded by Jacksonbille Road, Wilson, Greeley, and Chase Aves. 40°12′31″N 75°04′25″W	Ivyland	
67	Morgan James Homestead	Morgan James Homestead	December 27, 1977 (#77001127)	Northwest of New Britain on Ferry Road; 40°18′19″N 75°12′04″W	New Britain Township	
68	James-Lorah House	James-Lorah House	October 17, 1972 (#72001096)	132 N. Main Street; 40°18′46″N 75°07′52″W	Doylestown	
69	Jefferson Avenue School	Jefferson Avenue School	July 18, 1985 (#85001569)	Jefferson Avenue and Pond Street; 40°06′02″N 74°50′43″W	Bristol	
70	Jefferson Land Association Historic District	Jefferson Land Association Historic District	November 5, 1987 (#87001994)	Bounded by Spring Street, Jefferson Avenue, Garden, and Mansion Streets, and Beaver Dam Road; 40°06′24″N 74°51′17″W	Bristol	
71	Keith House–Washington's Headquarters	Keith House–Washington's Headquarters	November 14, 1978 (#78002356)	East of Pineville on Pineville Road; 40°17′44″N 74°56′49″W	Upper Makefield Township	
72	William Kitchen House	William Kitchen House	March 6, 1985 (#85000464)	332 S. Sugan Road; 40°21′06″N 74°57′50″W	New Hope	
73	Knecht's Mill Covered Bridge	Knecht's Mill Covered Bridge	December 1, 1980 (#80003432)	Northeast of Springtown on Township 424; 40°34′11″N 75°15′04″W	Springfield Township	
74	Gen. John Lacey Homestead	Gen. John Lacey Homestead	December 2, 1980 (#80003448)	Forest Grove Road; 40°16′57″N 75°01′15″W	Buckingham Township	
75	Langhorne Historic District	Langhorne Historic District	November 20, 1987 (#87001993)	Summit and Marshall Avenues, Pine Street, Richardson Avenue, and Green Street; 40°10′33″N 74°55′16″W	Langhorne	
76	Langhorne Library	Langhorne Library	January 9, 1986 (#86000038)	160 W. Maple Avenue; 40°10′31″N 74°55′24″W	Langhorne	
77	Langhorne Manor School	Langhorne Manor School	June 10, 2008 (#08000518)	618 Hulmeville Avenue; 40°09′52″N 74°55′16″W	Langhorne Manor	
78	David Leedom Farm	David Leedom Farm	January 1, 1976 (#76001609)	Southwest of Newtown off Richboro Road; 40°13′19″N 74°57′25″W	Newtown Township	
79	Lehigh Valley Transit Station	Lehigh Valley Transit Station	February 27, 2023 (#100008645)	513 West Walnut St. 40°22′20″N 75°17′49″W	Perkasie	
80	Liberty Hall	Liberty Hall	January 26, 1978 (#78002358)	1237 W. Broad Street; 40°26′34″N 75°21′07″W	Quakertown	
81	Little Jerusalem AME Church	Little Jerusalem AME Church	December 3, 1980 (#80003429)	1200 Bridgewater Road; 40°05′57″N 74°55′26″W	Bensalem Township	
82	Longland	Longland	December 20, 1999 (#99001498)	2909 Holicong Road; 40°20′37″N 75°03′26″W	Buckingham Township	
83	Loux Covered Bridge	Loux Covered Bridge	December 1, 1980 (#80003442)	Southeast of Pipersville on Legislative Route 09060; 40°25′21″N 75°07′41″W	Plumstead Township	
84	Lumberville Historic District	Lumberville Historic District	August 9, 1984 (#84003165)	Fleecy Dale, Carversville, River, and Green Hill Roads, Lumberville; 40°24′15″N 75°02′14″W	Solebury Township	
85	Makefield Meeting	Makefield Meeting	January 18, 1974 (#74001758)	Northeast of Newtown at Mt. Eyre Road and Dolington Road; 40°15′57″N 74°53′14″W	Upper Makefield Township	
86	Mechanicsville Village Historic District	Mechanicsville Village Historic District	January 4, 1989 (#88003049)	Junction of Mechanicsville Road and Pennsylvania Route 413; 40°20′40″N 75°04′36″W	Buckingham Township	
87	Mercer Museum	Mercer Museum	March 16, 1972 (#72001097)	Pine and Ashland Streets; 40°18′28″N 75°07′38″W	Doylestown	
88	Moland House	Moland House	May 19, 1989 (#89000352)	1641 Old York Road; 40°14′10″N 75°05′34″W	Warwick Township	
89	Moravian Pottery and Tile Works	Moravian Pottery and Tile Works	June 1, 1972 (#72001098)	Court Street and Pennsylvania Route 313; 40°19′23″N 75°07′25″W	Doylestown	
90	George Nakashima House, Studio and Workshop	George Nakashima House, Studio and Workshop	August 14, 2008 (#08000782)	1847 and 1858 Aquetong Road; 40°20′23″N 74°57′19″W	Solebury Township	
91	New Hope Village District	New Hope Village District	March 6, 1985 (#85000462)	Old Mill Road, Stockton Avenue, Ferry, Bridge, Mechanic, Randolph, Main, Coryell, and Waterloo Streets; 40°21′30″N 74°57′09″W	New Hope	
92	Newtown Creek Bridge	Newtown Creek Bridge	June 22, 1988 (#88000787)	Richboro Road over Newtown Creek; 40°13′40″N 74°56′20″W	Newtown	
93	Newtown Friends Meetinghouse and Cemetery	Newtown Friends Meetinghouse and Cemetery	July 21, 1977 (#77001129)	Court Street; 40°13′32″N 74°56′10″W	Newtown	
94	Newtown Historic District	Newtown Historic District	December 17, 1979 (#79002174)	Pennsylvania Routes 332 and 413; also the eastern side of Sycamore St. from Frost Ln. to St. Andrew's Catholic Church; also parts of Congress, Chancellor and Liberty Sts. north of Washington Ave., and Chancellor St. south of Penn St. to S. State St. 40°13′39″N 74°56′11″W	Newtown	Second and third sets of boundaries represent boundary increases of February 25, 1986 and October 28, 1986
95	Newtown Presbyterian Church	Newtown Presbyterian Church	July 16, 1987 (#87001212)	Sycamore Street; 40°13′56″N 74°56′20″W	Newtown	
96	Amos Palmer House	Amos Palmer House	November 18, 1988 (#88002661)	Township Line Road; 40°12′44″N 74°52′53″W	Lower Makefield Township	
97	Isaiah Paxson Farm	Isaiah Paxson Farm	August 23, 1984 (#84003167)	Along River Road across from its junction with Laurel Road; 40°24′14″N 74°59′22″W	Solebury Township	
98	Phineas Pemberton House	Phineas Pemberton House	September 28, 1971 (#71000684)	Holly Drive in Levittown; 40°09′37″N 74°50′23″W	Bristol Township	
99	Penn's Park General Store Complex	Penn's Park General Store Complex	January 8, 1985 (#85000072)	2310-2324 Second Street Pike; 40°15′57″N 74°59′56″W	Wrightstown Township	
100	Penns Park Historic District	Penns Park Historic District	March 13, 1986 (#86000349)	Intersection of Second Street Pike and Penns Park Road; 40°15′59″N 74°59′50″W	Wrightstown Township	
101	Pennsbury Manor	Pennsbury Manor	October 28, 1969 (#69000154)	On the Delaware River south of Bordentown Road; 40°08′00″N 74°46′12″W	Falls Township	
102	Pennsylvania Railroad Bridge	Pennsylvania Railroad Bridge	June 6, 1979 (#79001502)	Spans Delaware River; 40°12′24″N 74°46′09″W	Morrisville	Extends into Mercer County, New Jersey
103	Perkasie Park Camp Meeting	Perkasie Park Camp Meeting	August 29, 2016 (#16000571)	200 S. 9th St. 40°22′26″N 75°18′05″W	Perkasie	
104	Phillips Mill Historic District	Phillips Mill Historic District	June 30, 1983 (#83002220)	River Road between Limeport and Chapel Road; 40°22′58″N 74°58′10″W	Solebury Township	
105	Pine Valley Covered Bridge	Pine Valley Covered Bridge	December 1, 1980 (#80003437)	North of New Britain on Township 340; 40°18′19″N 75°11′16″W	New Britain Township	
106	Point Pleasant Historic District	Point Pleasant Historic District	October 5, 1989 (#89001652)	River Road and Point Pleasant Pike; 40°25′20″N 75°03′58″W	Plumstead and Tinicum Townships	
107	Quakertown Historic District	Quakertown Historic District	April 20, 2011 (#11000200)	Roughly bounded by Main and Broad Streets; Hellertown, Tohickon, and Park Avenues; 40°26′30″N 75°20′30″W	Quakertown	
108	Quakertown Passenger and Freight Station	Quakertown Passenger and Freight Station	April 14, 2000 (#00000382)	Front and E. Broad Streets; 40°26′23″N 75°20′04″W	Quakertown	
109	Red Hill Church and School	Red Hill Church and School	May 22, 1978 (#78002355)	Durham Road; 40°28′09″N 75°09′27″W	Tinicum Township	
110	Rhoads Homestead	Rhoads Homestead	August 8, 1996 (#85003655)	102-106 W. Bridge Street; 40°22′13″N 74°57′28″W	New Hope	
111	Joseph Richardson House	Joseph Richardson House	December 26, 1985 (#85003159)	Bellevue and Maple Avenues; 40°10′33″N 74°55′12″W	Langhorne	
112	Ridge Valley Historic District	Ridge Valley Historic District	August 8, 2025 (#100012082)	Allentown Road and Ridge Valley Road; 40°22′34″N 75°22′38″W	West Rockhill Township	
113	Ridge Valley Rural Historic District	Ridge Valley Rural Historic District	July 24, 1992 (#92000944)	Roughly all of Sheep Hole Road and parts of Headquarters, Geigel Hill, Red Hill, Tabor and Bunker Hill Roads; 40°28′31″N 75°08′29″W	Tinicum Township	
114	Benjamin Riegel House	Benjamin Riegel House	January 6, 1987 (#86003569)	29 Delaware Road; 40°35′41″N 75°11′35″W	Riegelsville	
115	Riverside Farm	Riverside Farm	April 21, 1988 (#88000461)	River and Headquarters Roads; 40°30′01″N 75°04′06″W	Erwinna	
116	Enoch Roberts House	Enoch Roberts House	April 24, 1986 (#86000856)	1226 W. Broad Street; 40°26′32″N 75°21′07″W	Quakertown	
117	St. Elizabeth's Convent	St. Elizabeth's Convent	March 21, 1978 (#78002352)	1663 Bristol Pike; 40°04′23″N 74°57′26″W	Bensalem Township	Now the Saint Katharine Drexel Shrine
118	Shaw Historic District	Shaw Historic District	December 17, 1979 (#79002172)	Bounded by S. Main, Ashland, Bridge, and S. Clinton Streets; 40°18′25″N 75°07′48″W	Doylestown	
119	Sheard's Mill Covered Bridge	Sheard's Mill Covered Bridge	December 1, 1980 (#80003445)	East of Quakertown on Legislative Route 09129; 40°27′17″N 75°16′44″W	East Rockhill and Haycock Townships	
120	Levi Sheard Mill	Levi Sheard Mill	December 20, 2006 (#06001149)	8308 Covered Bridge Road; 40°27′24″N 75°16′40″W	East Rockhill Township	
121	Shelly School	Shelly School	February 22, 2011 (#11000037)	130 Richlandtown Pike (Pennsylvania Route 212); 40°27′10″N 75°19′36″W	Richland Township	
122	Slate Hill Cemetery	Slate Hill Cemetery	April 28, 1992 (#92000397)	Junction of Yardley-Morrisville Road and Mahlon Drive; 40°13′56″N 74°49′39″W	Lower Makefield Township	
123	Smith Family Farmstead	Smith Family Farmstead	January 30, 1978 (#78002354)	South of New Hope on River Road; 40°19′06″N 74°55′39″W	Upper Makefield Township	
124	William Smith House	William Smith House	April 13, 1977 (#77001131)	Mud and Penns Park Road; 40°15′56″N 74°59′08″W	Wrightstown Township	
125	Sotcher Farmhouse	Sotcher Farmhouse	December 27, 1977 (#77001125)	335 Trenton Road; 40°10′41″N 74°51′27″W	Falls Township	
126	South Perkasie Covered Bridge	South Perkasie Covered Bridge	December 1, 1980 (#80003441)	South of Perkasie in Lenape Park, South Perkasie; 40°22′03″N 75°17′43″W	Perkasie	
127	Southampton Baptist Church and Cemetery	Southampton Baptist Church and Cemetery	September 18, 1978 (#78002359)	2nd Street Pike and Maple Avenue; 40°11′01″N 75°02′10″W	Upper Southampton Township	
128	Spinner House	Spinner House	June 22, 1979 (#79002175)	Spinnerstown and Sleepy Hollow Rds. 40°26′20″N 75°26′16″W	Milford Township	
129	Spring Valley Historic District	Spring Valley Historic District	January 7, 1988 (#88000140)	Mill Road and U.S. Route 202; 40°19′07″N 75°04′59″W	Buckingham Township	
130	Springdale Historic District	Springdale Historic District	March 6, 1985 (#85000461)	Mechanic Street, Old York, S. Sugan, and Stoney Hill Roads; 40°21′43″N 74°57′50″W	New Hope	
131	Springhouse Farm	Springhouse Farm	August 8, 2007 (#07000796)	2184 Springhouse Lane; 40°31′44″N 75°16′27″W	Springfield Township	
132	Springtown Historic District	Springtown Historic District	January 10, 2008 (#07001379)	Main Street between Drifting Drive and Springtown Hill Road; 40°33′24″N 75°17′16″W	Springfield Township	
133	Stover Mill	Stover Mill	October 18, 1979 (#79002173)	Pennsylvania Route 32; 40°29′48″N 75°04′06″W	Erwinna	
134	Isaac Stover House	Isaac Stover House	April 26, 1990 (#90000702)	River Road south of Geigel Hill Road; 40°29′49″N 75°04′07″W	Erwinna	
135	Jacob Stover Farmstead	Jacob Stover Farmstead	December 16, 2019 (#100004762)	921 River Rd. 40°32′43″N 75°04′36″W	Upper Black Eddy	
136	Stover-Myers Mill	Stover-Myers Mill	September 13, 1978 (#78002357)	North of Pipersville on Dark Hollow Road; 40°26′15″N 75°07′26″W	Bedminster Township	
137	Reuben and Elizabeth Strassburger Farmstead	Reuben and Elizabeth Strassburger Farmstead	January 17, 2017 (#100000501)	407 Keystone Dr. 40°20′15″N 75°18′12″W	Hilltown Township	
138	Lewis Summers Farm	Lewis Summers Farm	August 27, 1991 (#91001124)	60 Headquarters Road; 40°28′08″N 75°09′01″W	Tinicum Township	
139	Summerseat	Summerseat	July 17, 1971 (#71000685)	Clymer Street and Morris Avenue; 40°12′28″N 74°46′48″W	Morrisville	
140	Tabor Home for Needy and Destitute Children	Tabor Home for Needy and Destitute Children	July 16, 1987 (#87001207)	601 New Britain Road; 40°17′32″N 75°07′47″W	Doylestown Township	
141	Benjamin Taylor Homestead	Benjamin Taylor Homestead	December 6, 1975 (#75001622)	Northeast of Newtown off Pennsylvania Route 532; 40°15′26″N 74°54′43″W	Lower Makefield Township	
142	Peter Taylor Farmstead	Peter Taylor Farmstead	May 5, 1989 (#89000353)	229 Wrights Road; 40°15′16″N 74°56′07″W	Newtown Township	
143	Teller Cigar Factory	Teller Cigar Factory	January 6, 1987 (#86003567)	340 N. Main Street; 40°21′43″N 75°18′48″W	Sellersville	
144	John Thompson House	John Thompson House	July 16, 1973 (#73001595)	1925 Second Street Pike; 40°14′44″N 75°00′32″W	Northampton Township	
145	Tomlinson-Huddleston House	Tomlinson-Huddleston House	November 10, 1983 (#83004200)	109 W. Maple Avenue; 40°10′34″N 74°55′17″W	Langhorne	
146	Trenton City/Calhoun Street Bridge	Trenton City/Calhoun Street Bridge	November 20, 1975 (#75001621)	Spans the Delaware River between Trenton, New Jersey and Morrisville; 40°13′11″N 74°46′42″W	Morrisville	
147	Trevose Manor	Trevose Manor	May 24, 1976 (#76001607)	5408 Neshaminy Valley Road; 40°08′45″N 74°56′01″W	Bensalem Township	Also known as Growden Mansion
148	Twin Trees Farm	Twin Trees Farm	June 5, 1975 (#75001623)	905 2nd Street Pike; 40°12′41″N 75°00′39″W	Northampton Township	
149	Twining Farm	Twining Farm	July 1, 1982 (#82003766)	Buck Road; 40°13′09″N 74°56′22″W	Newtown Township	
150	George F. Tyler Mansion	George F. Tyler Mansion	July 16, 1987 (#87001210)	Western side of Swamp Road/Pennsylvania Route 313; 40°14′22″N 74°58′09″W	Newtown	
151	Uhlerstown Historic District	Uhlerstown Historic District	May 26, 1994 (#94000517)	Roughly bounded by the Delaware River, Jugtown Hill Road, and the Delaware Canal; 40°31′44″N 75°04′20″W	Tinicum Township	
152	Uneek Havana Cigar Company	Uneek Havana Cigar Company	November 7, 2007 (#07001160)	1259 Pennsylvania Route 113; 40°22′07″N 75°15′02″W	Hilltown Township	
153	Upper Aquetong Valley Historic District	Upper Aquetong Valley Historic District	July 30, 1987 (#87001216)	Meeting House and Aquetong Roads, between U.S. Route 202 and Sugan Road; 40°21′44″N 75°00′07″W	Solebury Township	
154	Van Sandt Covered Bridge	Van Sandt Covered Bridge	December 1, 1980 (#80003438)	Covered Bridge Road; 40°19′37″N 74°57′29″W	Solebury Township	
155	Maxo Vanka Property	Maxo Vanka Property	August 5, 2026 (#100013294)	3080 Wilkinson Road; 40°15′21″N 75°02′18″W	Jamison	
156	Vansant Farmhouse	Vansant Farmhouse	August 2, 1977 (#77001130)	North of Rushland on Ceder Lane; 40°16′14″N 75°01′08″W	Wrightstown Township	
157	Village of Edgewood Historic District	Village of Edgewood Historic District	November 28, 1980 (#80003433)	Yardley, Langhorne, Edgewood and Stony Hill Roads; 40°13′22″N 74°52′31″W	Lower Makefield Township	
158	Waldenmark	Waldenmark	August 30, 2001 (#01000924)	1280 and 1300 Wrightstown Road; 40°16′32″N 74°58′13″W	Wrightstown Township	
159	Walt Disney Elementary School	Walt Disney Elementary School	August 30, 2007 (#07000889)	200 Lakeside Drive N., Levittown; 40°09′13″N 74°49′08″W	Tullytown	
160	Isaiah Warner Farmstead	Isaiah Warner Farmstead	August 20, 2004 (#04000883)	60 Thompson Mill Road; 40°17′16″N 74°58′40″W	Wrightstown Township	
161	Washington Crossing State Park	Washington Crossing State Park	October 15, 1966 (#66000650)	Between Yardley and New Hope, on the Delaware River; 40°17′57″N 74°52′07″W	Yardley	
162	White Hall of Bristol College	White Hall of Bristol College	January 12, 1984 (#84003177)	701-721 Shadyside Avenue; 40°04′48″N 74°54′08″W	Bristol Township	
163	Willow Mill Complex	Willow Mill Complex	May 9, 2002 (#02000476)	570, 559, and 569 Bustleton Pike; 40°11′58″N 75°00′38″W	Northampton Township	
164	Wrightstown Friends Meeting Complex	Wrightstown Friends Meeting Complex	October 29, 1975 (#75001624)	Pennsylvania Route 413; 40°15′55″N 74°59′00″W	Wrightstown Township	
165	Wrightstown Octagonal Schoolhouse	Wrightstown Octagonal Schoolhouse	November 9, 2007 (#07000586)	2091 Second Street Pike; 40°15′24″N 75°00′23″W	Wrightstown Township	
166	Wycombe Village Historic District	Wycombe Village Historic District	January 31, 1985 (#85000177)	Roughly bounded by township line, Mill Creek and Forest Grove Roads, Cherry Lane, Washington and Park Avenues; 40°16′57″N 75°01′07″W	Buckingham and Wrightstown Townships	
167	Yardley Historic District	Yardley Historic District	May 10, 2005 (#05000417)	Roughly bounded by Main Street, Afton Avenue, Letchworth Avenue, Canal Street, S. Edgewater Avenue, and the Delaware Canal; 40°14′34″N 74°50′11″W	Yardley	

== Former listings ==
	Name on the Register	Image	Date listed	Date removed	Location	City or town	Description
1	Bristol Carpet Mills		October 16, 1986 (#86002893)	April 13, 1994	Beaver Dam and Canal Streets	Bristol	
2	Cintra	Cintra	March 6, 1985 (#85000460)	December 29, 2025	181 W. Bridge Street; 40°21′50″N 74°57′35″W	New Hope	
3	Fretz Farm	Fretz Farm	March 7, 1985 (#85000459)	August 16, 2012	Almshouse Road and Pennsylvania Route 611; 40°16′15″N 75°07′44″W	Doylestown Township	Delisted due to significant alterations.
4	Haupt's Mill Covered Bridge	Haupt's Mill Covered Bridge	December 1, 1980 (#80003446)	June 27, 1986	Legislative Route 09061 in Durham	Springfield Township	Destroyed by arson on January 14, 1985.
5	Mood's Covered Bridge	Mood's Covered Bridge	December 1, 1980 (#80003440)	August 19, 2004	East of Perkasie of Legislative Route 09118	East Rockhill Township	Damaged by an overweight truck on January 21, 2004. Destroyed by arson on June 22, 2004.
6	Twining Ford Covered Bridge	Twining Ford Covered Bridge	December 1, 1980 (#80003439)	June 1, 1994	West of Newtown in Tyler State Park	Newtown and Northampton Townships	Photo from 1981. Destroyed by arson, 1991. A replica bridge was erected in 1997.
