= Joseph Burger (disambiguation) =

Joseph C. Burger was a United States Marine Corps officer and college athlete.

Joseph Burger may also refer to:

- Joseph Burger (Medal of Honor), Austrian German soldier and Medal of Honor recipient in the American Civil War
- Joseph Burger House in Mechanicsville Village Historic District

== See also ==
- Joseph Berger (disambiguation)
