= Joseph Berger =

Joseph or Joe Berger may refer to:

- Joe Berger (born 1982), American football player
- Joe Berger (baseball) (1886–1956), Major League Baseball player
- Joe Berger (illustrator) (born 1965), English illustrator and cartoonist
- Joseph Berger (sociologist) (1924–2023), American theoretical sociologist
- Joseph Berger (author) (born 1945), author and contributing editor for The New York Times
- Joseph Berger (neurologist) (born 1951), American internist and neurologist
- Joseph B. Berger III (born c. 1970), American general

== See also ==
- Josef Berger (disambiguation)
- Joseph Berger-Barzilai (1904–1978), Israeli communist and Comintern member
- Joseph Burger (disambiguation)
