= Longland (Holicong, Pennsylvania) =

Historic house in Pennsylvania, United States

- U.S. National Register of Historic Places
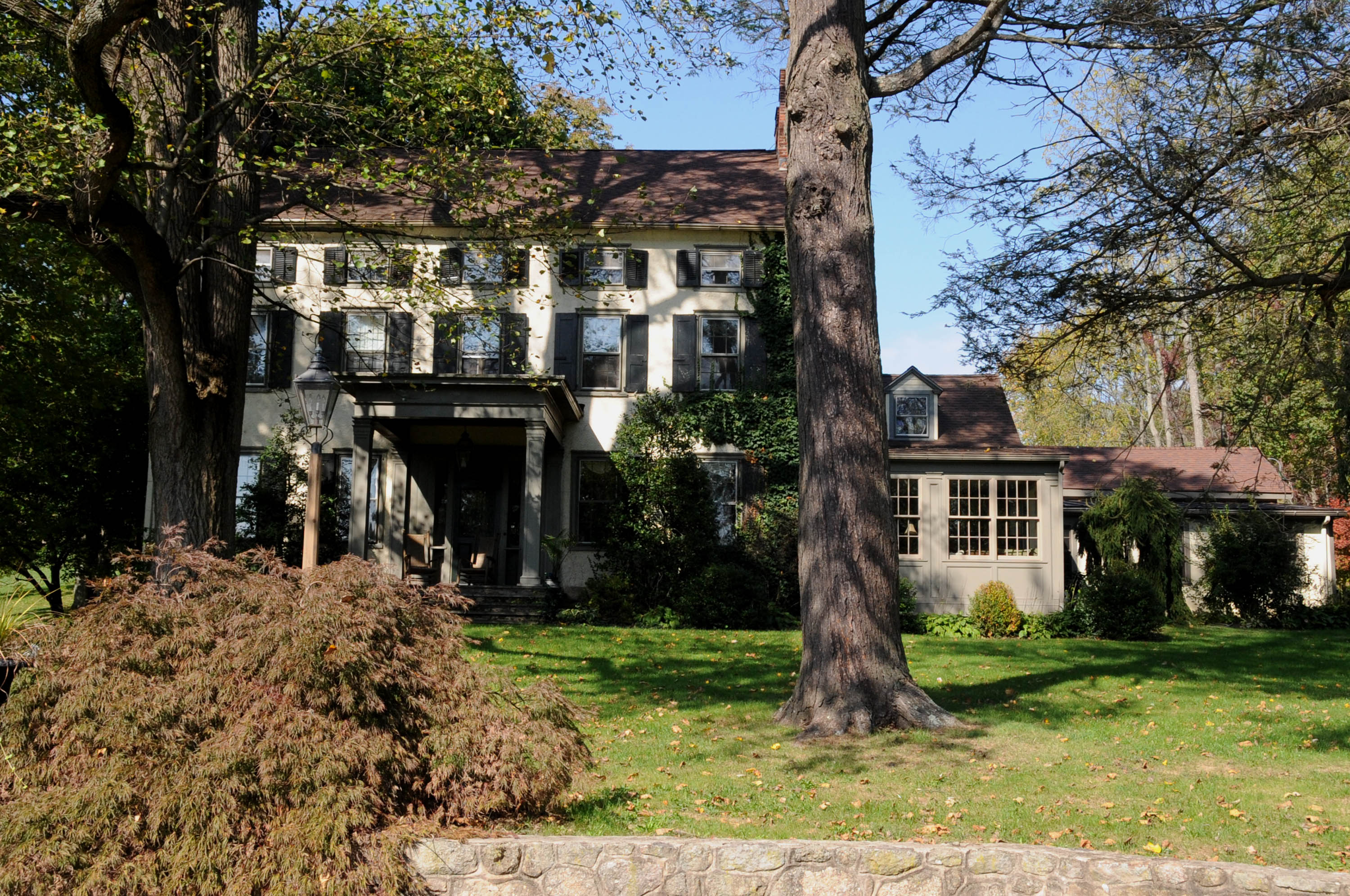
- Longland

- Location within Pennsylvania Location within the United States
- Location: 2909 Holicong Road, near Holicong, Pennsylvania
- Coordinates: 40°20′37″N 75°03′26″W
- Area: 14.9 acres (6.0 ha)
- Built: 1844, 1845
- Architectural style: Greek Revival
- NRHP reference No.: 99001498
- Added to NRHP: December 20, 1999

Longland, also known as the Margaret Mead Farmstead, is an historic home that is located near Holicong, in Buckingham Township, Bucks County, Pennsylvania, United States.

It was added to the National Register of Historic Places in 1999.

== History and architectural features ==
The house was built in 1845, and is a large two-and-three-quarter-story, five-bay by two-bay, stuccoed, stone dwelling. It has Greek Revival design details and features an ornate entranceway with rectangular transom and sidelights. Alsolocated on the property is a three-story, stone bank barn, which dates to 1844. It has an attached one-story stone ell. Other contributing buildings are a two-story, wood-frame wagon house and woodshed/garage that abuts the house. This historic structure was a childhood home of American anthropologist Margaret Mead (1901-1978). Her family purchased the property in 1912 and sold it in 1926.
