= Holicong Village Historic District =

Historic district in Pennsylvania, United States

- U.S. National Register of Historic Places
- U.S. Historic district
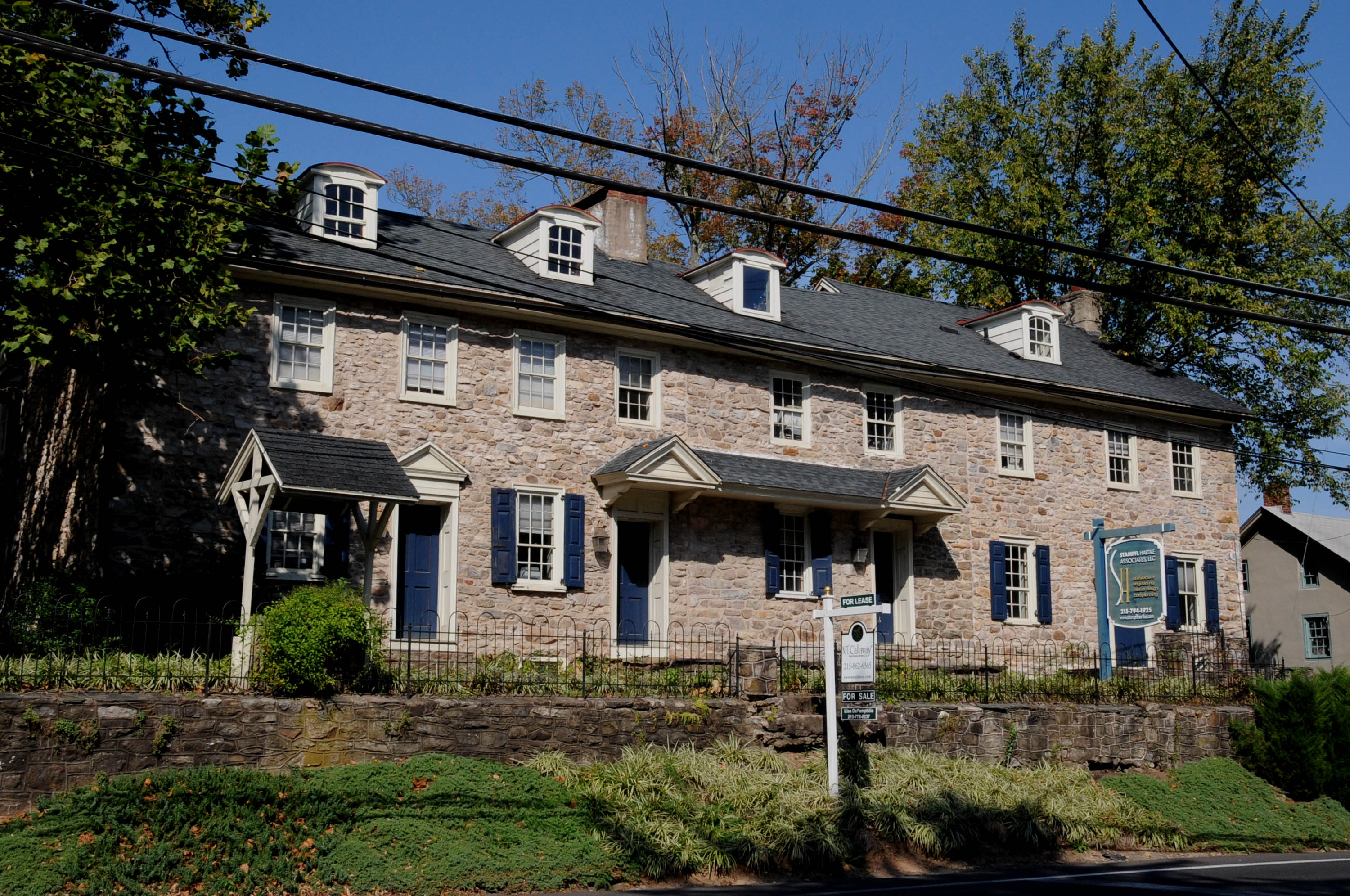

- Location within Pennsylvania Location within the United States
- Location: U.S. 202 and Holicong Rd., Holicong, Buckingham Township, Pennsylvania
- Coordinates: 40°20′09″N 75°02′55″W
- Area: 45.9 acres (18.6 ha)
- Architectural style: Georgian
- NRHP reference No.: 80003435
- Added to NRHP: March 20, 1980

The Holicong Village Historic District is a national historic district which is located in Holicong, Buckingham Township, Bucks County, Pennsylvania.

It was added to the National Register of Historic Places in 1980.

== History and architectural features ==
This district includes eighteen contributing buildings which are located in the crossroads village of Holicong. They include a variety of residential, commercial, and institutional buildings, some of which are representative of the vernacular Georgian style.

The residential buildings are predominantly two-and-one-half-story, stone structures with some stuccoed, some of which date to the mid-eighteenth century.

Notable buildings include the limekiln, which was erected sometime around 1732, the pre-1750 Quarryman's House, the Holicong Store and Post Office, which were built during the early 1800s, Martha Hampton's School for Girls, which was erected circa 1824, Greenville Public School No. 4, which was built in 1863, the Anvil House, the Holicroft House, and the Barley Sheaf Farm.
