= Josef Berger =

Josef Berger may refer to:

- Josef Berger (field hockey), Austrian field hockey player
- Josef Berger (speechwriter) (1903–1971), American journalist, author and speechwriter
- Josef Berger (scientist) (born 1949), Czech scientist

== See also ==
- Joseph Berger (disambiguation)
