= Yardley Historic District =

- U.S. National Register of Historic Places
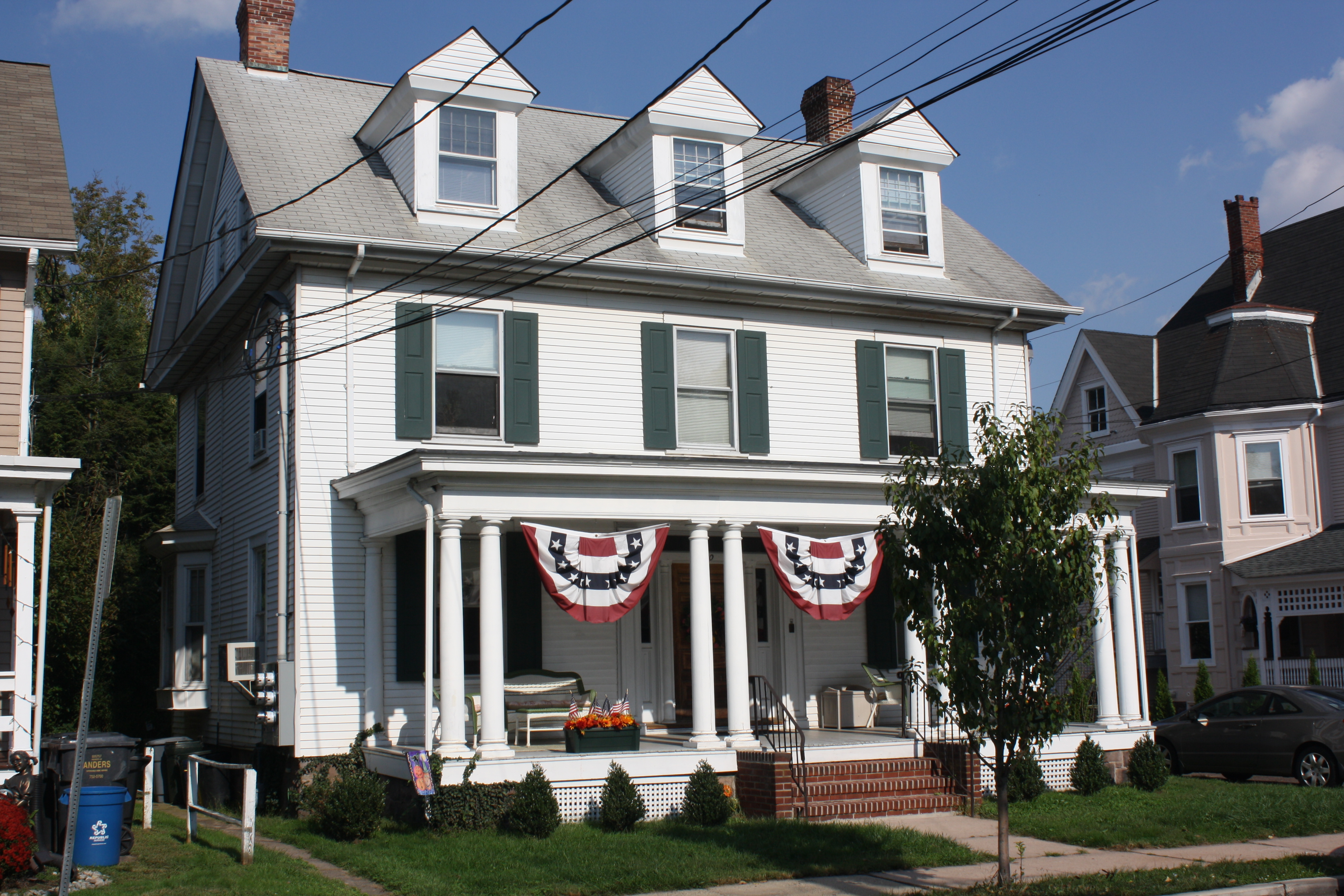
- Home in the Yardley Historic District, October 2012

- Location within Pennsylvania
- Location: Roughly bounded by Main St., Afton Ave., Letchworth Ave., Canal St., S. Edgewater Ave., and Delaware Canal, Yardley, Pennsylvania
- Coordinates: 40°14′34″N 74°50′11″W
- Area: 65.2 acres (26.4 ha)
- Built: ca. 1830-1905
- Architect: Martin A. Oscar
- Architectural style: Gothic Revival, Federal
- NRHP reference No.: 05000417
- Added to NRHP: May 10, 2005

The Yardley Historic District is a national historic district located at Yardley, Pennsylvania. It encompasses 65.2 acres and 200 contributing buildings, 1 contributing site (St. Andrew's Episcopal Church cemetery), and 1 contributing structure (Lake Afton). It includes a residential and commercial building built between about 1728 and 1930 in a variety of architectural styles including the Federal and Gothic Revival style. Notable buildings include the Thomas Yardley House (ca. 1728), Yardley Grist Mill (ca. 1769), Joshua Van Horn House (ca. 1795), Yardley Public Library (ca. 1878), Yardley Borough Hall (ca. 1900), and Yardley National Bank Building (ca. 1916).

It was added to the National Register of Historic Places in 2005.

== See also ==
- List of Registered Historic Places in Bucks County, Pennsylvania
