= Liberty Hall (Quakertown, Pennsylvania) =

Historic house in Pennsylvania, United States

- U.S. National Register of Historic Places
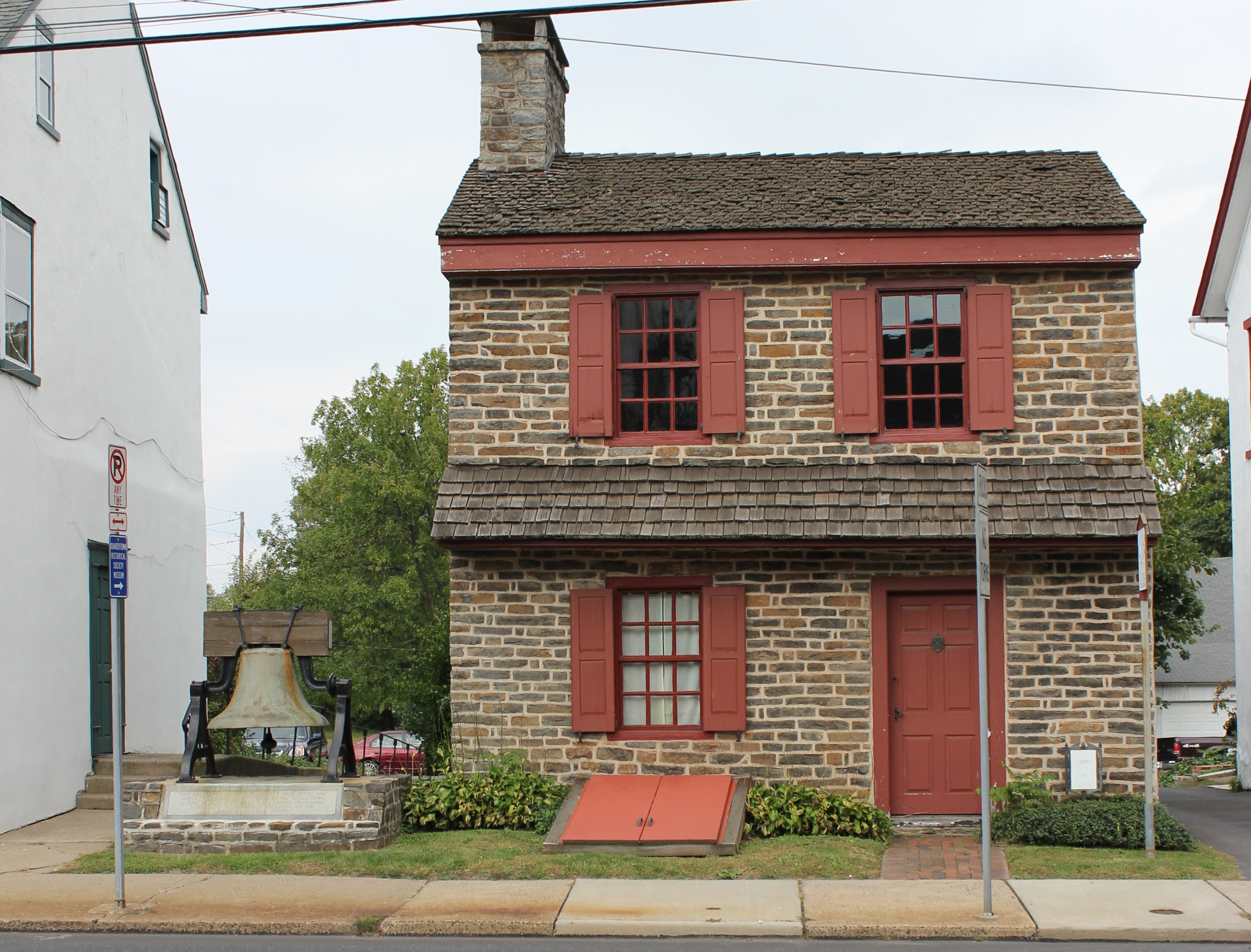
- Liberty Hall, September 2012

- Location within Pennsylvania Location within the United States
- Location: 1237 W. Broad St., Quakertown, Pennsylvania
- Coordinates: 40°26′34″N 75°21′7″W
- Area: 0.2 acres (0.081 ha)
- Built: 1777
- Built by: Roberts, Abel
- Architectural style: Colonial
- NRHP reference No.: 78002358
- Added to NRHP: January 26, 1978

Liberty Hall is an historic building in Quakertown, Bucks County, Pennsylvania, United States. Purchased by the borough of Quakertown in 1977, it was added to the National Register of Historic Places in 1978.

== History and architectural features ==
Built in 1772 as the first permanent residence in Quakertown, this historic structure is a two-story, 15 feet (4.6 meters) by fifteen-foot building with one room per floor. It was built using native fieldstone and has a half gambrel roof. It represents a simple colonial Quaker style of design.

The Liberty Bell is purported to have been hidden on the property overnight on its way to Allentown, Pennsylvania, United States. In 1777, the Continental Congress had decreed that the bell be moved before the British Army captured it and melted it down for ammunition. On the night of September 23, 1777, six days after the Liberty Bell was removed from Philadelphia, it was stored overnight behind Evan Foulke's house near The Red Lion Inn at the corner of Broad and Main Streets in Quakertown.

The next day it continued on its journey to Allentown, where it was hidden for the remainder of the Revolutionary War.

This historic home remained in use as a residence until 1805, when a new dwelling was constructed. It was then used for farm storage and later for commercial purposes. Purchased by the borough of Quakertown in 1977,

== See also ==
- National Register of Historic Places listings in Bucks County, Pennsylvania
