= Buckingham Friends Meeting House =

Historic church in Pennsylvania, United States

- U.S. National Register of Historic Places
- U.S. National Historic Landmark
- Pennsylvania state historical marker
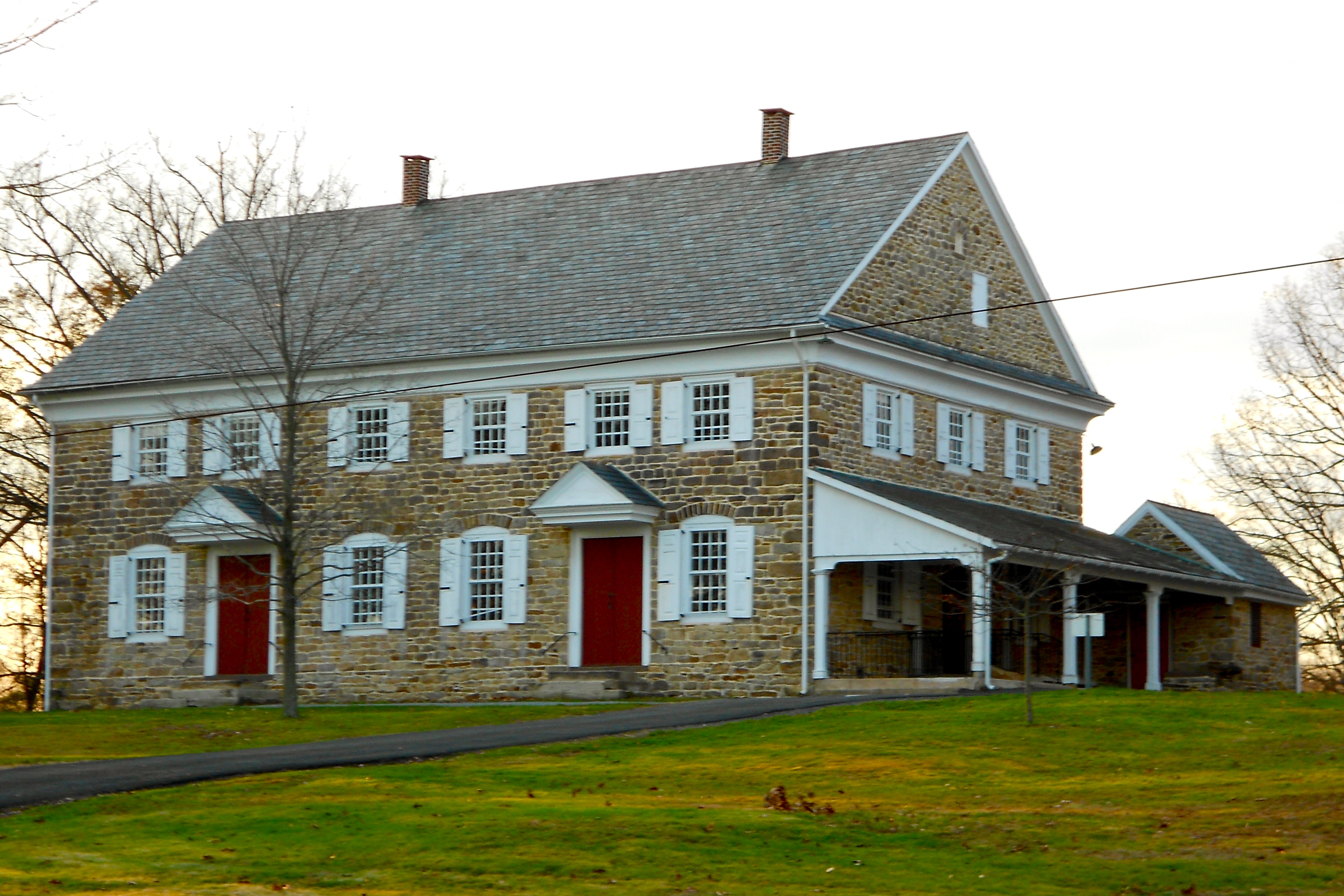
- Southern (front) and eastern sides

- Location within Pennsylvania Location within the United States
- Location: 5684 Lower York Road (US Rte. 202), Buckingham Township, Pennsylvania, U.S.
- Coordinates: 40°20′56″N 75°2′27″W
- Area: 39 acres (16 ha)
- Built: 1768
- Architect: Matthias Hutchinson, Arthur Edwin Bye
- Architectural style: Georgian
- NRHP reference No.: 97000291 (original); 03001034 (addition)

Significant dates
- Added to NRHP: March 28, 1997 (original); July 31, 2003 (addition)
- Designated NHL: July 31, 2003
- Designated PHMC: March 26, 1947

The Buckingham Friends Meeting House is a historic Quaker meeting house at 5684 Lower York Road (U.S. Route 202) in Buckingham Township, Bucks County, Pennsylvania. Built in 1768 in a "doubled" style, it is nationally significant as a model for many subsequent Friends Meeting Houses. It was declared a National Historic Landmark in 2003.

== History ==
The first meeting house on the site was built from logs in 1705–1708 by English Quakers, some of the earliest settlers in the area. The second meetinghouse was a wooden frame building. The third was a stone building built sometime around 1731. Remnants of some of these buildings, especially stone mounting blocks used to help mount horses, are scattered around the property.

A stone schoolhouse was built to the east of the meetinghouse in 1798, and forms the nucleus of the current Buckingham Friends School. The current building was completed in 1768 and was the first of the doubled type meeting houses that became the standard form of Quaker meeting house for the next 100 years.

Earlier meeting houses were generally single-cell structures, that were often divided by a partition into two unequally sized for separate men's and women's business meetings. Men and women met together for worship and were separated for business meetings. Buckingham's design is a two-cell symmetrical form with roughly equal-sized sections.

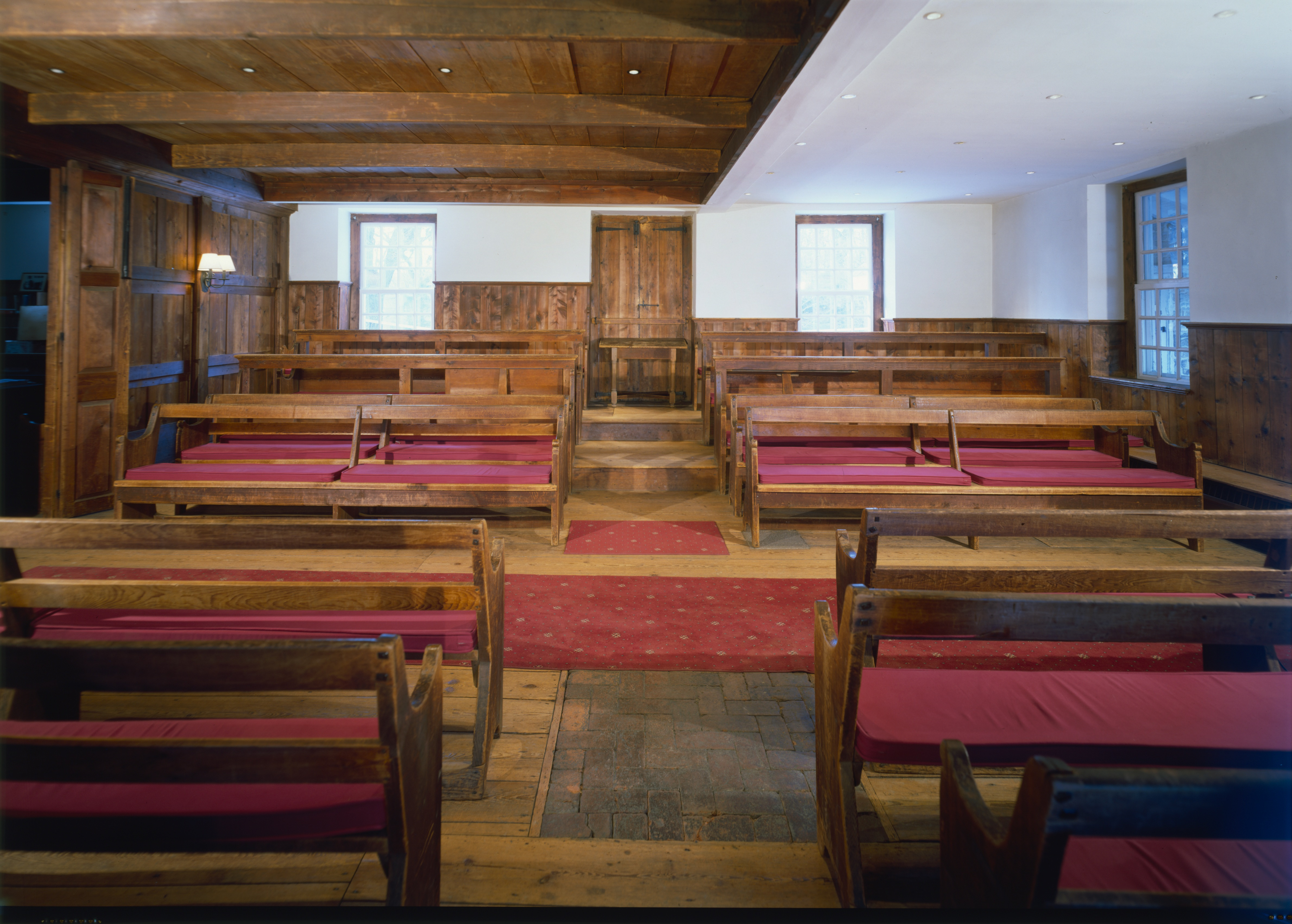
Interior showing the partition on the left

After this change in design, men and women would sit on separate sides of the partition for both worship and business meetings, with the partition closed only during business meetings. Around this time, written Quaker discipline became more standardized, which may have encouraged the two-cell form as a uniform meeting house design. In particular, marrying a non-Quaker became grounds for disownment or being "read out of the meeting." Since marriage was in the purview of the women's business meeting, their business meeting acquired a higher status and needed increased space.

The use of the Buckingham Meeting House as a model began within a few years of its completion. In New Jersey at least five meeting houses were built in the doubled style by 1788, with several being designed by committees who travelled to see the Meeting House.

The Quaker ideal of simplicity was perhaps ignored by the Buckingham Meeting House's Georgian architectural design, which may reflect the affluence of the Buckingham Quakers.

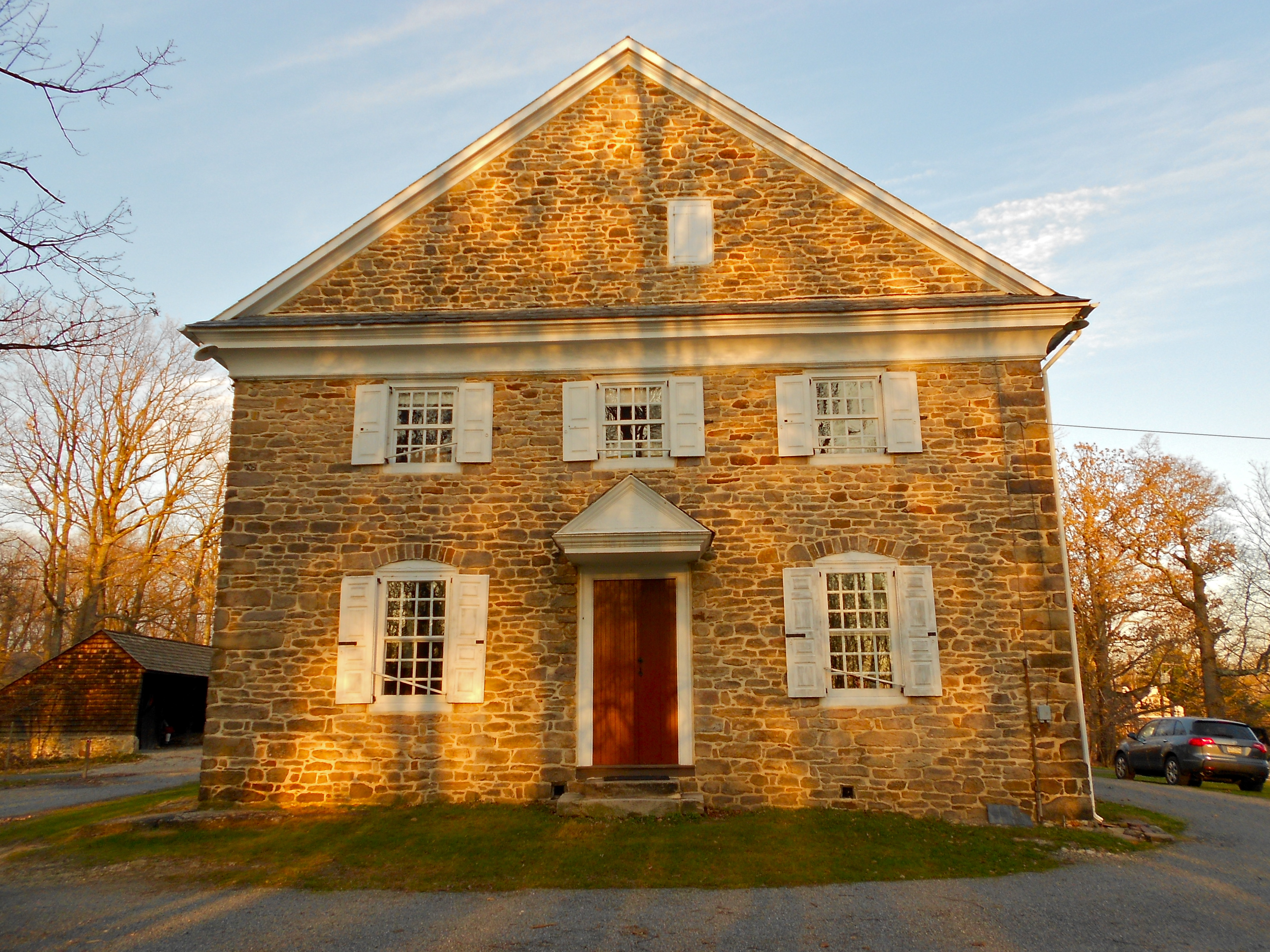
West end of the meeting house.

== See also ==
- Horsham Friends Meeting
- List of National Historic Landmarks in Pennsylvania
- National Register of Historic Places listings in Bucks County, Pennsylvania
