= Thomas and Lydia Gilbert Farm =

Historic house in Pennsylvania, United States

- U.S. National Register of Historic Places
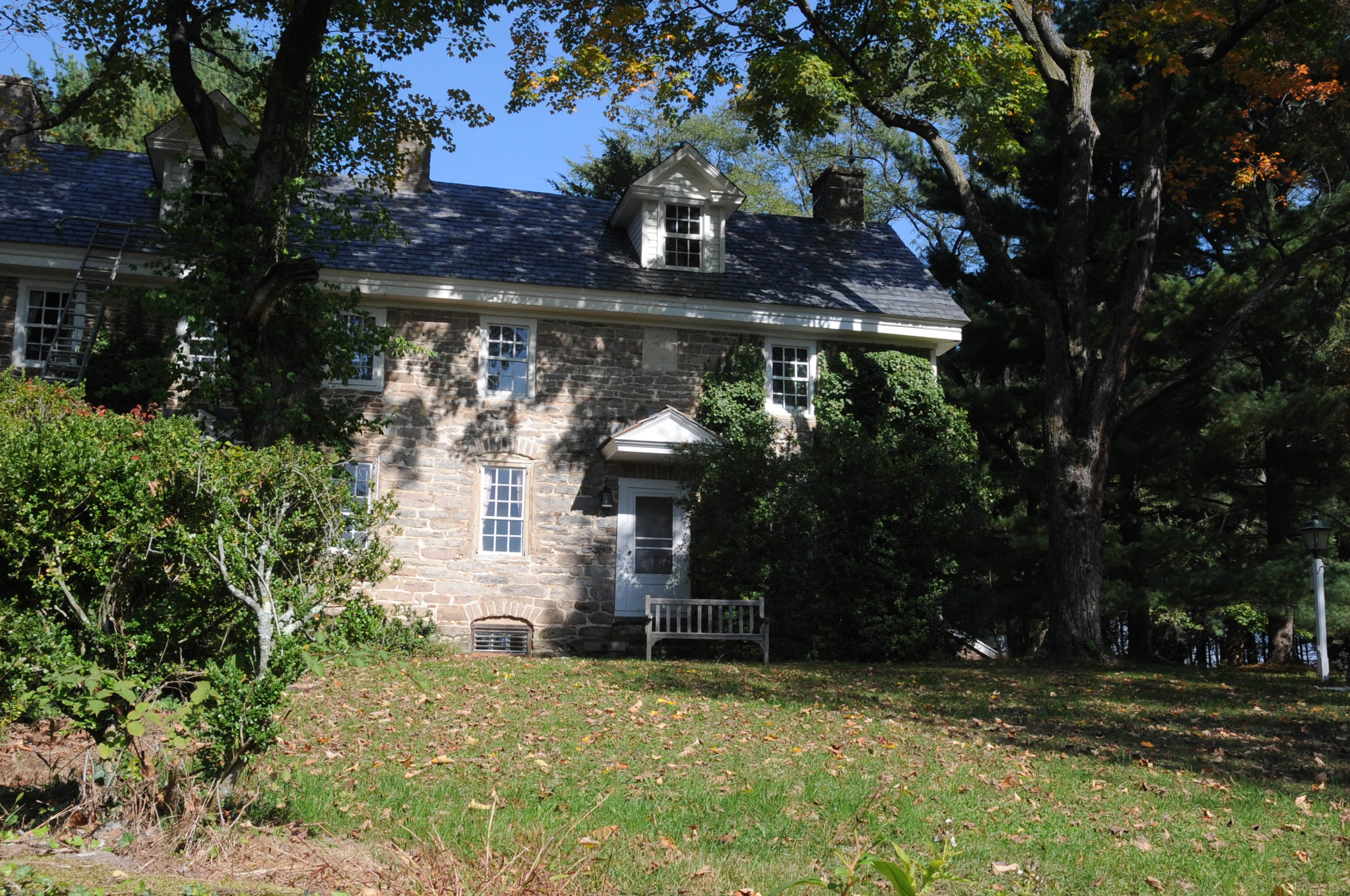
- Thomas and Lydia Gilbert Farmhouse, October 2010

- Location within Pennsylvania Location within the United States
- Location: 5042 Anderson Rd., Holicong, Pennsylvania
- Coordinates: 40°20′14″N 75°3′36″W
- Area: 9.8 acres (4.0 ha)
- Built: 1711, 1735, 1808, 1812
- Architectural style: Vernacular Georgian
- NRHP reference No.: 89000351
- Added to NRHP: May 5, 1989

The Thomas and Lydia Gilbert Farm, also known as the Datestone Farm, is an historic home and farm complex that is located in Holicong, Buckingham Township, Bucks County, Pennsylvania.

It was added to the National Register of Historic Places in 1989.

== History and architectural features ==
The original section of this historic farmhouse was built in 1711, with additions made in 1735 and 1812. Each section is marked with a datestone. It consists of two 2 1/2-story, stone sections with a unifying cornice, roofline, and slate-covered gable roof and was designed in a vernacular Georgian style. The farmhouse was restored between 1970 and 1972. and a frame addition completed on the west side of the house. Also located on the property are a contributing stone and frame bank barn, a stone and frame wagon house (c. 1840), and a stone spring house with a datestone of 1808.
