= Bogart's Tavern =

Historic tavern in Buckingham, Pennsylvania

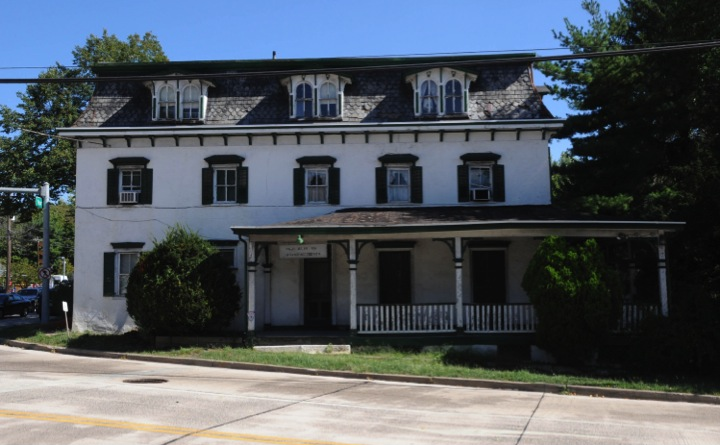

- Location within Pennsylvania
- 40.32357°N 75.06042°W
- Type: Military

Bogart's Tavern was a tavern established c. 1763 in Buckingham, Pennsylvania. It was a hotbed for revolutionary activity in Bucks County leading up to the Revolutionary War.

== Beginnings ==
The tavern was established in around 1763 by Henry Jamison of Ireland. By 1775, Bogart's Tavern had become the meeting place for the "Committee of Observation", which was a pro-revolution group in Bucks County. The Committee took actions such as compiling lists of supporters and those opposed to the revolution, boycotts of British goods, and took guns from some of those opposed to the revolution. The guns taken were used to raise a company of soldiers in 1775.

== Revolutionary War ==
In September 1776, after the loss in the Battle of Fort Lee, Major General Nathanael Greene and his troops went back to Pennsylvania. Greene found himself in Bucks County with the Continental Army. George Washington writing from Morrisville, Pennsylvania noted that the location of Bogart's Tavern was rather precariously located as it was surrounded by non-aligned Quakers and loyalist farmers. On December 10, 1776, Washington and Greene met at the tavern to sketch out the plans for the crossing of the Delaware, ultimately leading to a critical victory against the Hessians in the Battle of Trenton.

== After the War ==
The building had been largely ignored after the war, until a local historian discovered its significance in 1913, which brought renewed interested to the still-standing tavern. It was expanded into a, now defunct, hotel called the General Greene Inn and was granted a Pennsylvania State Historical Marker.
