= Buckingham Township, Bucks County, Pennsylvania =

Township in Pennsylvania, US

Buckingham, Pennsylvania
- Township
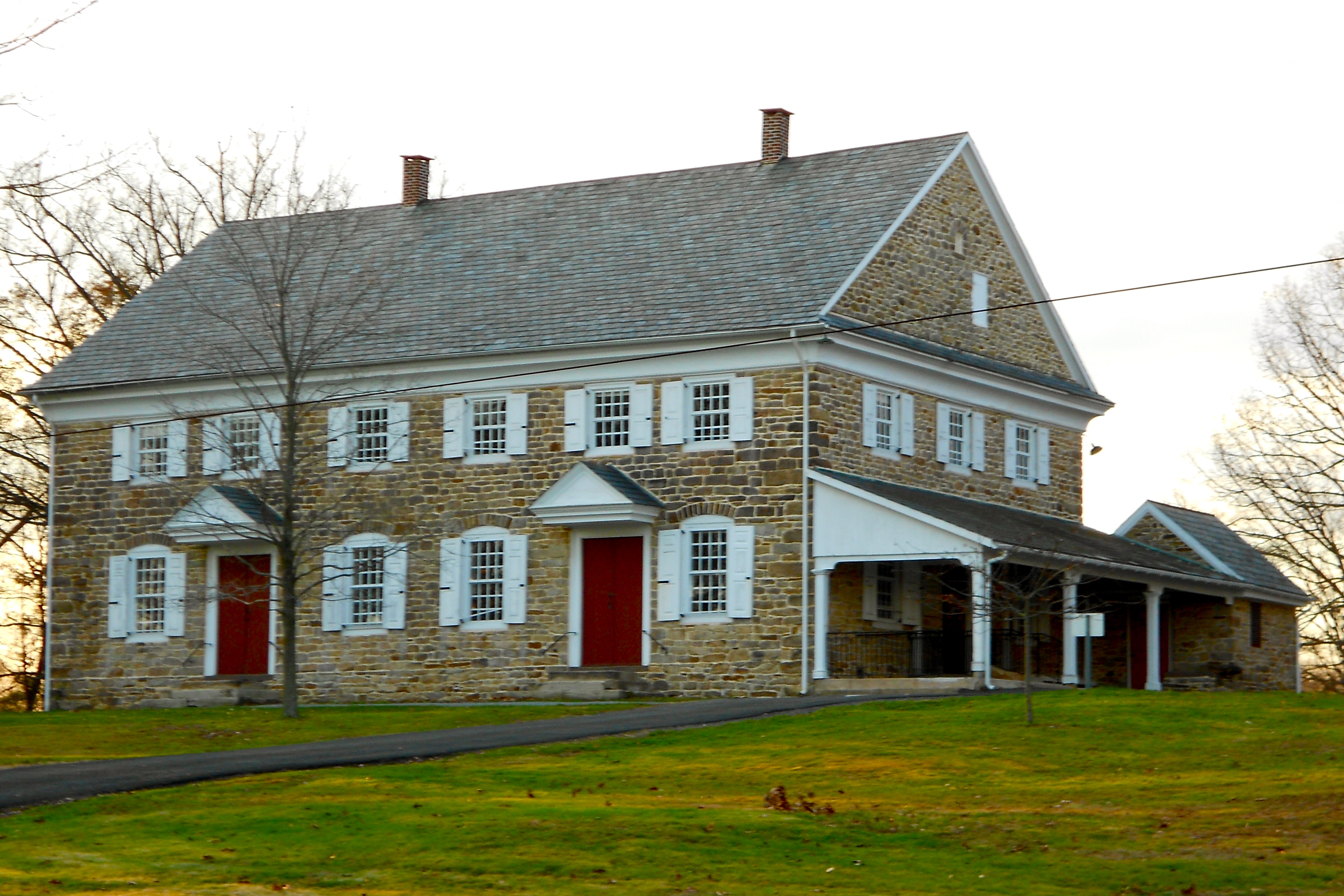
- Buckingham Friends Meeting House, built 1768

- Flag Seal

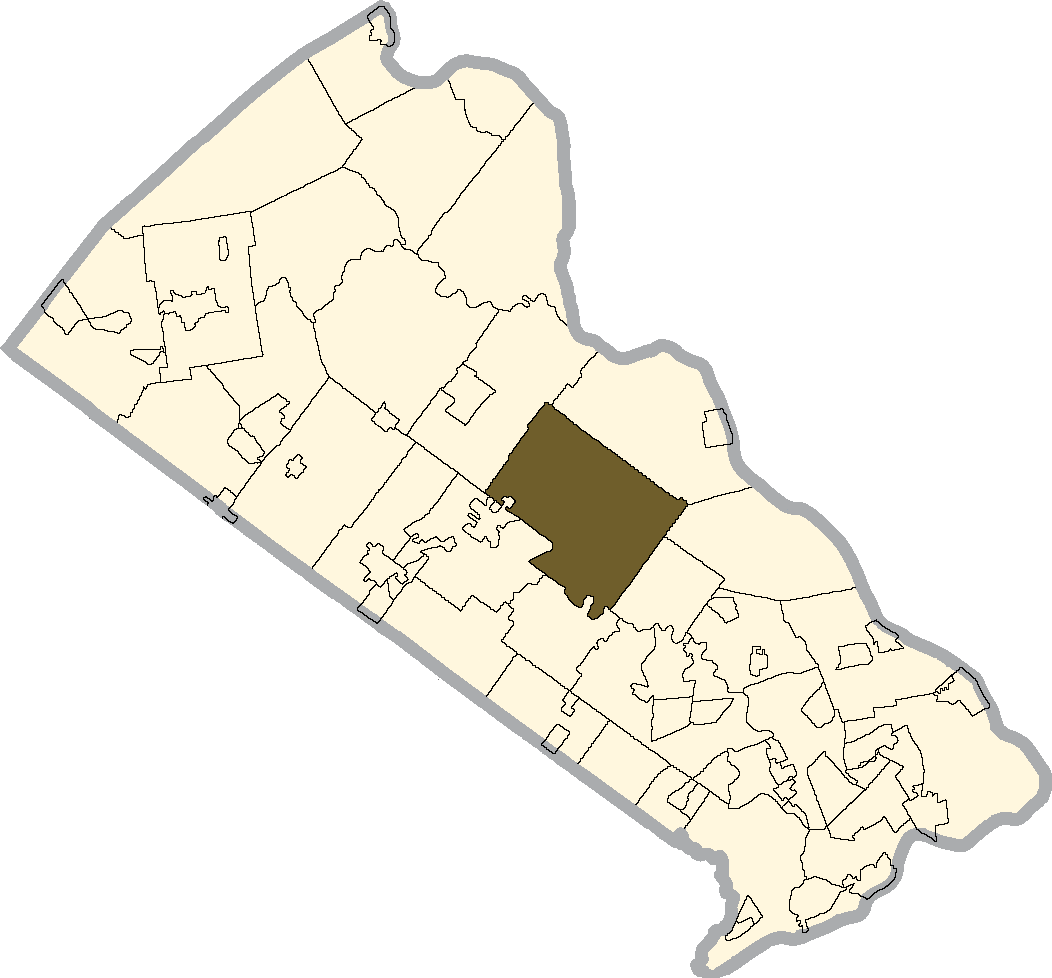
- Location of Buckingham Township in Bucks County

- Location in Pennsylvania and the United States Buckingham Township (the United States)
- Coordinates: 40°22′33″N 75°04′59″W
- Country: United States
- State: Pennsylvania
- County: Bucks

Area
  - Total: 33.02 sq mi (85.5 km^{2})
  - Land: 32.88 sq mi (85.2 km^{2})
  - Water: 0.14 sq mi (0.36 km^{2})
- Elevation: 364 ft (111 m)

Population (2020)
  - Total: 20,851
  - Density: 634.2/sq mi (244.8/km^{2})
- Time zone: UTC-5 (EST)
  - Summer (DST): UTC-4 (EDT)
- Area codes: 215/267/445
- FIPS code: 42-017-09816
- Website: www.buckinghampa.org

Buckingham Township is a township in Bucks County, Pennsylvania, United States. The population was 20,851 at the 2020 census. Buckingham takes its name from Buckingham in Buckinghamshire, England.

== History ==
In Buckingham and the Buckingham area, there are many important yet little known historical landmarks. One is Bogart's Tavern (now the General Greene Inn), on the corner of Route 413 (Durham Road) and Route 263 (Old York Road). It was from this building that General Nathanael Greene, commander of George Washington's left wing during the Battle of Trenton, made his headquarters during the winter of 1776.

The Buckingham Friends Meeting House, Byecroft Farm Complex, Forest Grove Historic District, Thomas and Lydia Gilbert Farm, Holicong Village Historic District, Longland, Mechanicsville Village Historic District, Spring Valley Historic District, and Wycombe Village Historic District are listed on the National Register of Historic Places. The Buckingham Friends Meeting House is also designated a National Historic Landmark District.

Mount Gilead A.M.E. Church was a station on the Underground Railroad.

== Geography ==
According to the U.S. Census Bureau, the township has a total area of 33.0 square miles (85 km^{2}), of which 32.9 square miles (85 km^{2}) is land and 0.14 square miles (0.36 km^{2}) (0.42%) is water. It is drained by the Delaware River and its villages include Bridge Valley, Buckingham, Buckingham Valley, Forest Grove, Furlong (also in Doylestown Township,) Highton (also in Solebury Township,) Holicong, Lahaska (also in Solebury Township,) Mechanicsville, Mozart, Pineville (also in Wrightstown Township,) and Wycombe (also in Wrightstown Township.)

Buckingham Township is home to a gravity hill, on Buckingham Mountain near Mount Gilead African Methodist Episcopal Church.

Past and present place names in Buckingham Township have included Beckytown, Broad Axe, Buckingham, Clayton, Cross Keys, Forest Grove, Furlong, Glendale, Highlon, Holicong, Hollekonk, Lahaska, Landisville, Mechanicsville, Mozart, Pineville, Pools Corner, Spring Valley, and Wycombe.

Natural features include Robin Run, Buckingham Cave, Buckingham Mountain, Curls Run, Dark Hollow, Flatiron Hill, Lahaska Creek, Lahaska Hill, Mill Creek, Neshaminy Creek, Paunacussing Creek, Pidcock Creek, Pine Run, and Watson Creek.

=== Neighboring municipalities ===
- Solebury Township (northeast)
- Upper Makefield Township (east)
- Wrightstown Township (southeast)
- Warwick Township (south)
- Doylestown Township (southwest and west)
- Doylestown (west)
- Plumstead Township (northwest)

== Demographics ==
Historical population
Census	Pop.	Note	%±
1930	2,213		—
1940	2,359		6.6%
1950	3,007		27.5%
1960	4,018		33.6%
1970	5,150		28.2%
1980	8,839		71.6%
1990	9,364		5.9%
2000	16,442		75.6%
2010	20,075		22.1%
2020	20,851		3.9%

As of the 2010 census, the township was 93.8% White, 1.1% Black or African American, 0.1% Native American, 3.4% Asian, and 1.2% were two or more races. People of Hispanic or Latino ancestry accounted for 2.4% of the population.

As of the census of 2000, there were 16,442 people, 5,711 households, and 4,694 families residing in the township. The population density was 497.0 inhabitants per square mile (191.9/km^{2}). There were 5,861 housing units at an average density of 177.2 per square mile (68.4/km^{2}). The racial makeup of the township was 96.75% White, 1.04% African American, 0.12% Native American, 1.19% Asian, 0.01% Pacific Islander, 0.26% from other races, and 0.64% from two or more races. Hispanic or Latino of any race were 1.34% of the population.

There were 5,711 households, out of which 40.2% had children under the age of 18 living with them, 75.8% were married couples living together, 4.5% had a female householder with no husband present, and 17.8% were non-families. 14.3% of all households were made up of individuals, and 6.2% had someone living alone who was 65 years of age or older. The average household size was 2.85 and the average family size was 3.18.

In the township, the population was spread out, with 28.3% under the age of 18, 4.1% from 18 to 24, 28.4% from 25 to 44, 25.9% from 45 to 64, and 13.3% who were 65 years of age or older. The median age was 40 years. For every 100 females there were 94.9 males. For every 100 females age 18 and over, there were 93.3 males.

The median income for a household in the township was $82,376, and the median income for a family was $90,968. Males had a median income of $71,649 versus $42,973 for females. The per capita income for the township was $35,735. About 2.4% of families and 4.1% of the population were below the poverty line, including 5.4% of those under age 18 and 2.3% of those age 65 or over.

== Climate ==
According to the Köppen climate classification system, Buckingham Twp has a Hot-summer, Humid continental climate (Dfa). Dfa climates are characterized by at least one month having an average mean temperature ≤ 32.0 °F (0.0 °C), at least four months with an average mean temperature ≥ 50.0 °F (10.0 °C), at least one month with an average mean temperature ≥ 71.6 °F (22.0 °C) and no significant precipitation difference between seasons. Although most summer days are slightly humid in Buckingham Twp, episodes of heat and high humidity can occur with heat index values > 107 °F (42 °C). Since 1981, the highest air temperature was 102.6 °F (39.2 °C) on July 22, 2011, and the highest daily average mean dew point was 75.1 °F (23.9 °C) on August 13, 2016. The average wettest month is July which corresponds with the annual peak in thunderstorm activity. Since 1981, the wettest calendar day was 6.73 inches (171 mm) on September 16, 1999. During the winter months, the average annual extreme minimum air temperature is −1.4 °F (−18.6 °C). Since 1981, the coldest air temperature was −12.5 °F (−24.7 °C) on January 22, 1984. Episodes of extreme cold and wind can occur with wind chill values < −12 °F (−24 °C). The average annual snowfall (Nov-Apr) is between 30 inches (76 cm) and 36 inches (91 cm). Ice storms and large snowstorms depositing ≥ 12 inches (30 cm) of snow occur once every few years, particularly during nor’easters from December through February.

Climate data for Buckingham Twp, Elevation 253 ft (77 m), 1981-2010 normals, extremes 1981-2018
Month	Jan	Feb	Mar	Apr	May	Jun	Jul	Aug	Sep	Oct	Nov	Dec	Year
Record high °F (°C)	70.7 (21.5)	77.6 (25.3)	87.0 (30.6)	93.8 (34.3)	94.6 (34.8)	95.3 (35.2)	102.6 (39.2)	99.2 (37.3)	97.3 (36.3)	89.2 (31.8)	80.3 (26.8)	74.8 (23.8)	102.6 (39.2)
Mean daily maximum °F (°C)	39.1 (3.9)	42.5 (5.8)	50.9 (10.5)	62.9 (17.2)	72.8 (22.7)	81.6 (27.6)	85.9 (29.9)	84.1 (28.9)	77.2 (25.1)	65.9 (18.8)	54.8 (12.7)	43.4 (6.3)	63.5 (17.5)
Daily mean °F (°C)	30.5 (−0.8)	33.3 (0.7)	40.8 (4.9)	51.6 (10.9)	61.2 (16.2)	70.5 (21.4)	75.1 (23.9)	73.5 (23.1)	66.2 (19.0)	54.6 (12.6)	44.9 (7.2)	35.0 (1.7)	53.2 (11.8)
Mean daily minimum °F (°C)	21.8 (−5.7)	24.0 (−4.4)	30.7 (−0.7)	40.3 (4.6)	49.7 (9.8)	59.4 (15.2)	64.3 (17.9)	62.8 (17.1)	55.2 (12.9)	43.3 (6.3)	35.0 (1.7)	26.6 (−3.0)	42.8 (6.0)
Record low °F (°C)	−12.5 (−24.7)	−4.5 (−20.3)	1.8 (−16.8)	16.6 (−8.6)	33.0 (0.6)	40.4 (4.7)	46.9 (8.3)	41.5 (5.3)	34.0 (1.1)	23.7 (−4.6)	11.0 (−11.7)	−2.4 (−19.1)	−12.5 (−24.7)
Average precipitation inches (mm)	3.32 (84)	2.67 (68)	3.85 (98)	3.96 (101)	4.34 (110)	4.38 (111)	5.07 (129)	4.06 (103)	4.45 (113)	4.16 (106)	3.67 (93)	3.97 (101)	47.90 (1,217)
Average relative humidity (%)	66.6	63.1	58.8	57.8	62.3	67.2	67.2	69.7	70.9	69.7	68.6	68.6	65.9
Average dew point °F (°C)	20.7 (−6.3)	22.1 (−5.5)	27.5 (−2.5)	37.2 (2.9)	48.2 (9.0)	59.1 (15.1)	63.5 (17.5)	63.0 (17.2)	56.5 (13.6)	44.9 (7.2)	35.2 (1.8)	25.7 (−3.5)	42.1 (5.6)
Source: PRISM

== Ecology ==
According to the A. W. Kuchler U.S. potential natural vegetation types, Buckingham Twp would have a dominant vegetation type of Appalachian Oak (104) with a dominant vegetation form of Eastern Hardwood Forest (25). The plant hardiness zone is 6b with an average annual extreme minimum air temperature of −1.4 °F (−18.6 °C). The spring bloom typically begins by April 11 and fall color usually peaks by October 31.

== Transportation ==
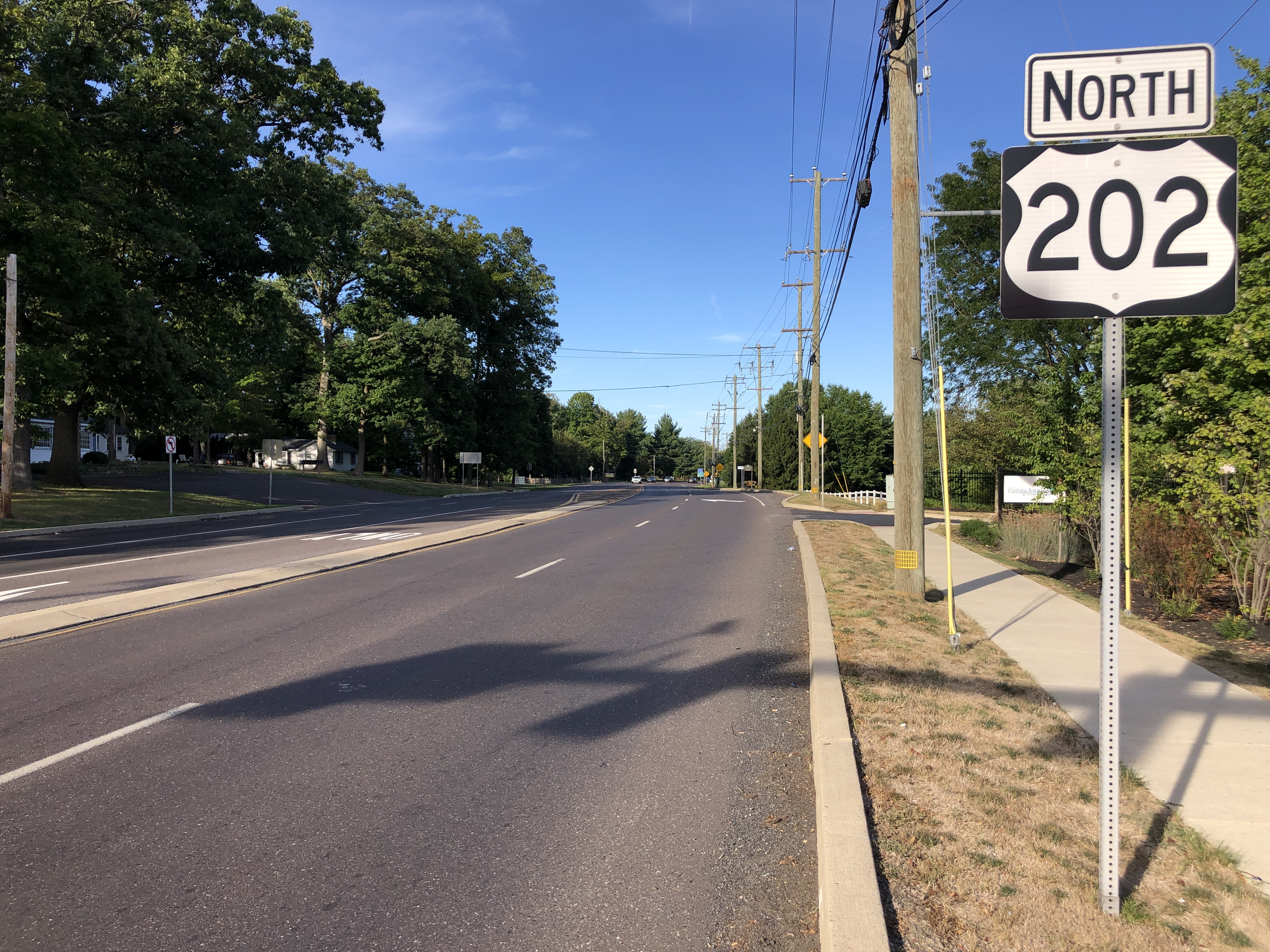
US 202 northbound in Buckingham Township

As of 2021 there were 151.86 miles (244.39 km) of public roads in Buckingham Township, of which 47.40 miles (76.28 km) were maintained by the Pennsylvania Department of Transportation (PennDOT) and 104.46 miles (168.11 km) were maintained by the township.

Major roads in Buckingham Township include U.S. Route 202, which runs southwest–northeast through the township between Doylestown and Lahaska along Doylestown Buckingham Pike, York Road, and Lower York Road; Pennsylvania Route 263, which runs north–south through the township along York Road (running concurrent with US 202 between Buckingham and Lahaska) and Upper York Road; Pennsylvania Route 313, which runs northwest–southeast along the southwestern border of the township between Doylestown and its eastern terminus at PA 263; and Pennsylvania Route 413, which runs northwest–southeast through the township along Durham Road. The New Hope Railroad passes through the eastern portion of the township.

Public transportation in Buckingham Township is limited to a small section of the SEPTA City Bus Route 55 line that passes through the western corner of the township along Easton Road on its route between Doylestown and Olney Transportation Center in North Philadelphia. Trans-Bridge Lines provides intercity bus service to Port Authority Bus Terminal in New York City from a stop at Peddler's Village in Lahaska along a route that originates in Quakertown.

The Doylestown Airport, a general aviation airport operated by the Bucks County Airport Authority serving the Doylestown area, is located in Buckingham Township.

== Notable people ==
- Charles Skelton – American politician (1806–1879), represented New Jersey's 2nd congressional district in the United States House of Representatives from 1851 to 1855.
- George Sotter, landscape painter
