= Byecroft Farm Complex =

- U.S. National Register of Historic Places
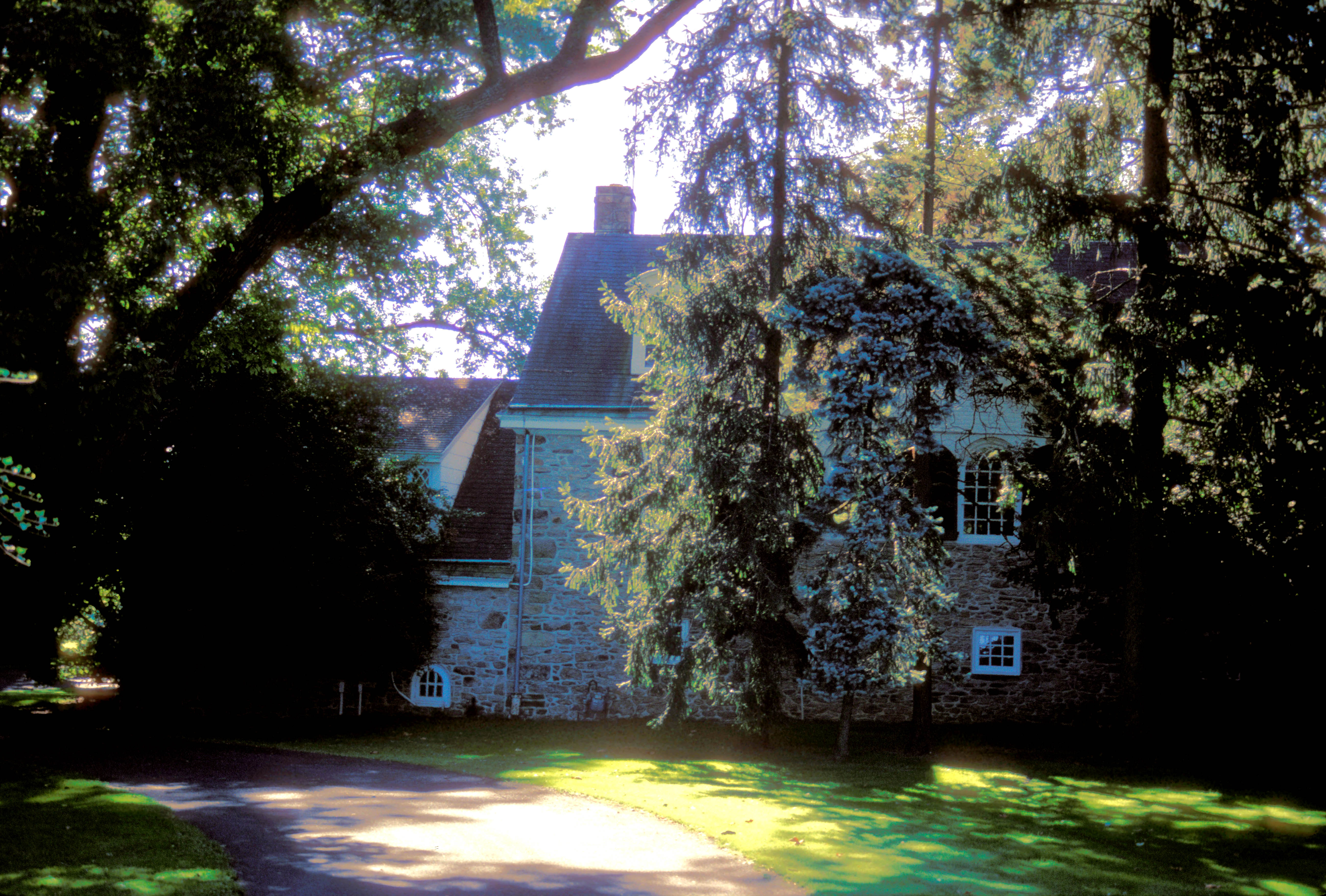

- Location within Pennsylvania Location within the United States
- Location: Off U.S. Route 202, Buckingham Township, Pennsylvania
- Coordinates: 40°20′13″N 75°02′20″W
- Area: 29.8 acres (12.1 ha)
- Built: 1702, 1732, 1775, c. 1830, 1934-1935
- Architectural style: Georgian
- NRHP reference No.: 83002219
- Added to NRHP: September 9, 1983

Byecroft Farm Complex, also known as "Old Congress," is a historic home and farm complex located in Buckingham Township, Bucks County, Pennsylvania. The oldest section of the main house was built in 1702, with three later additions. It consists of a central block with three wings. The central block was built in 1732, and is a 2 1/2-story, three-bay coursed fieldstone structure. The northeast wing consists of the original one-story structure built in 1702, with a second story added in 1775. A wing to the southwest was added in 1775, and expanded to 2 1/2-stories about 1830. In 1934-1935, a 1 1/2-story, two-bay, addition was built onto the southwest wing. The house is reflective of the Georgian style. Also on the property are the contributing Old Bye Barn (c. 1730), carriage house / studio (c. 1775), two-story frame barn, small carriage house / cottage, and pumphouse and well house.

It was added to the National Register of Historic Places in 1983.
