= Mechanicsville Village Historic District =

Historic district in Pennsylvania, United States

- U.S. National Register of Historic Places
- U.S. Historic district
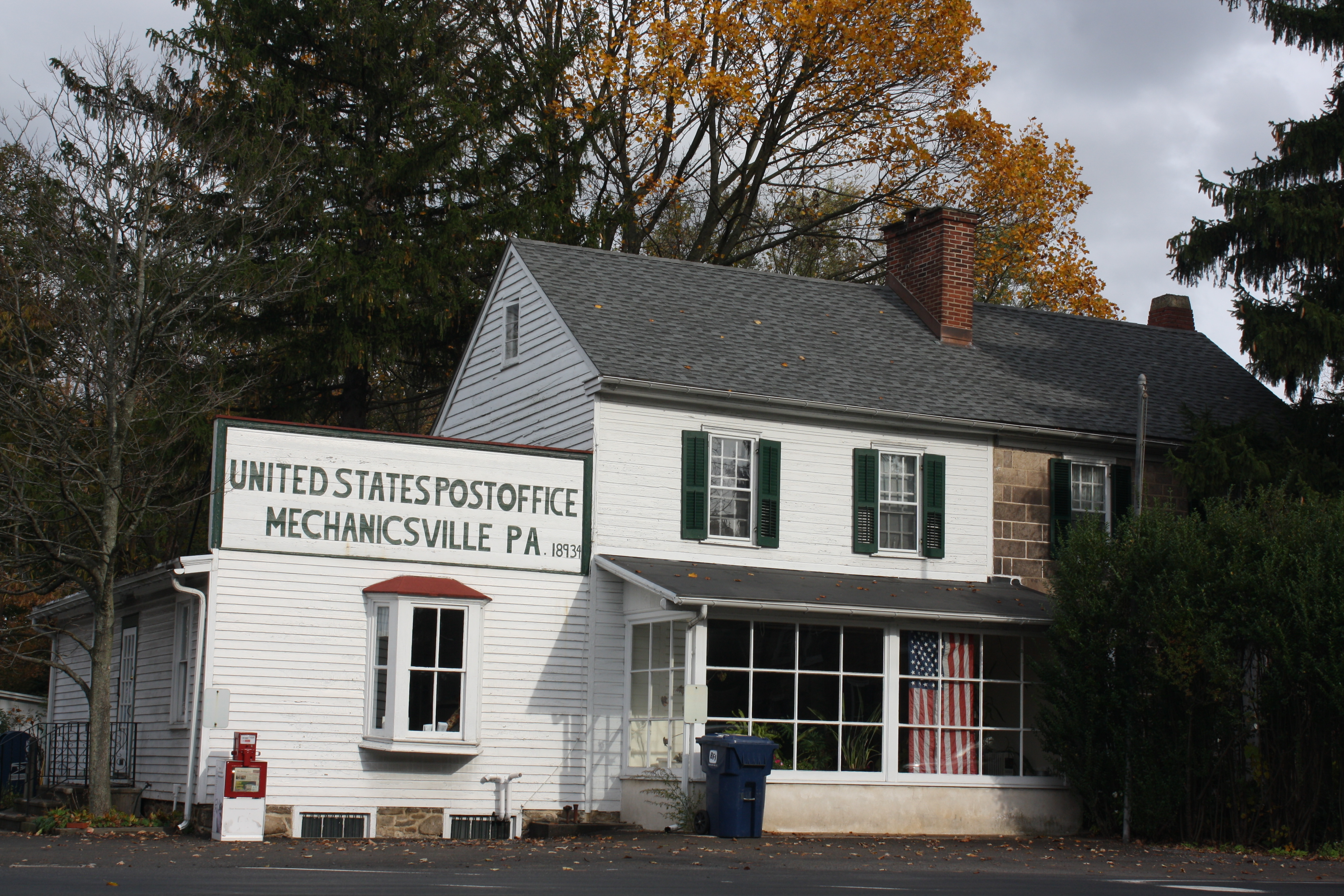
- Post office. October 2012.

- Location within Pennsylvania Location within the United States
- Location: Jct. Mechanicsville Rd. and Rt. 413, Mechanicsville, Buckingham Township, Pennsylvania
- Coordinates: 40°20′40″N 75°04′36″W
- Area: 15.7 acres (6.4 ha)
- Architectural style: Mid 19th Century Revival, Early Republic, Late Victorian
- NRHP reference No.: 88003049
- Added to NRHP: January 4, 1989

The Mechanicsville Village Historic District, also known as Fenton's Corner, New-Work, and Halifax, is a national historic district that is located in Mechanicsville, Buckingham Township, Bucks County, Pennsylvania.

It was added to the National Register of Historic Places in 1989.

== History and architectural features ==
This district includes twenty-seven contributing buildings that are located in the crossroads village of Mechanicsville. They include a variety of residential, commercial, and institutional buildings, some of which are representative of the vernacular, Late Victorian style. The residential buildings are predominantly 2 1/2-story, wood and stone structures, some of which date to the early-nineteenth century. Notable buildings include the Samuel Wilson Seed House (c. 1885), Thomas Walton Store and Residence (before 1814), Joseph Burger House (c. 1860), Thomas Walton Tenant House (c. 1815), Phineas Hellyer House (c. 1815), George Nixon House (c. 1830), and the William Fell House (c. 1810).

== Gallery ==
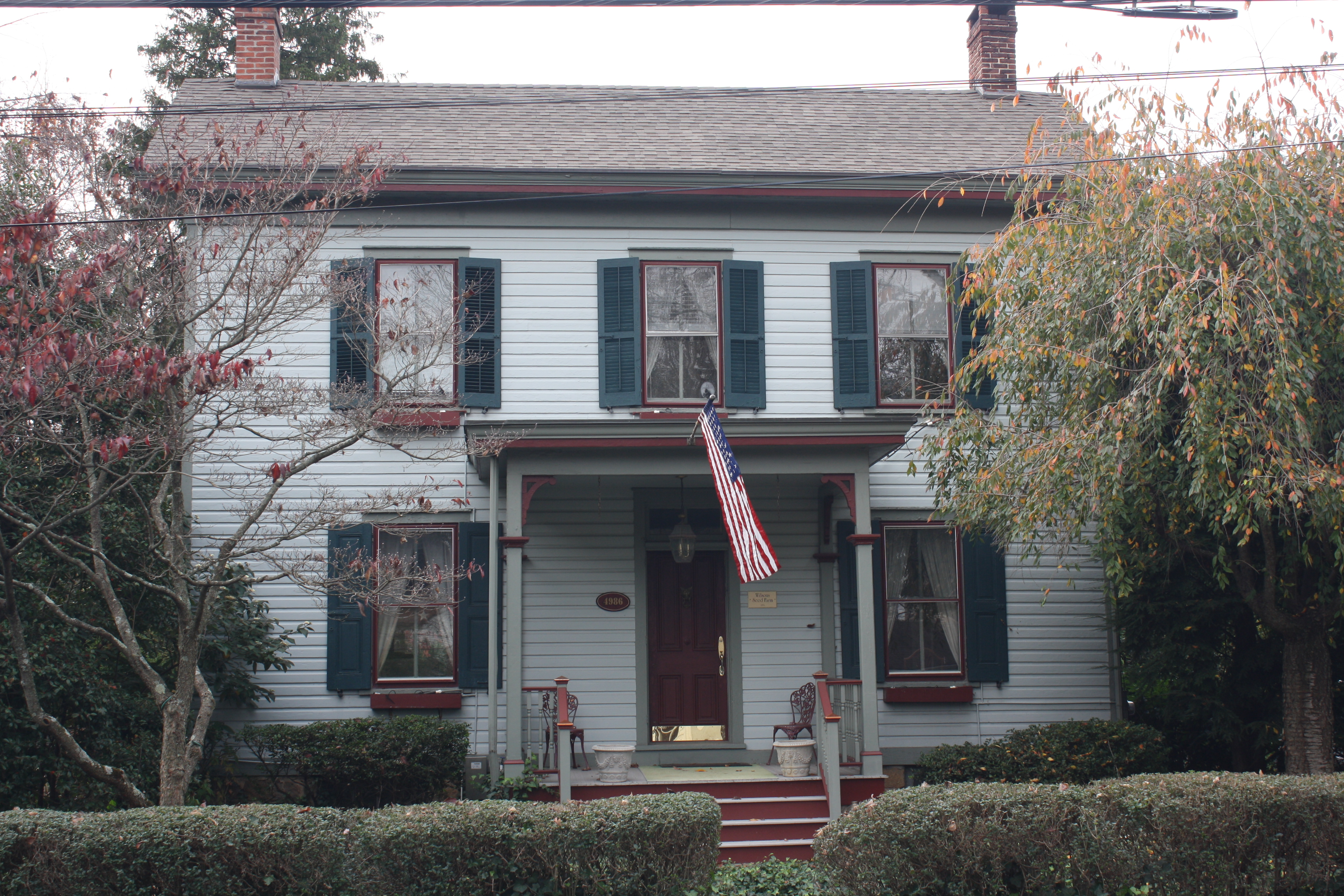

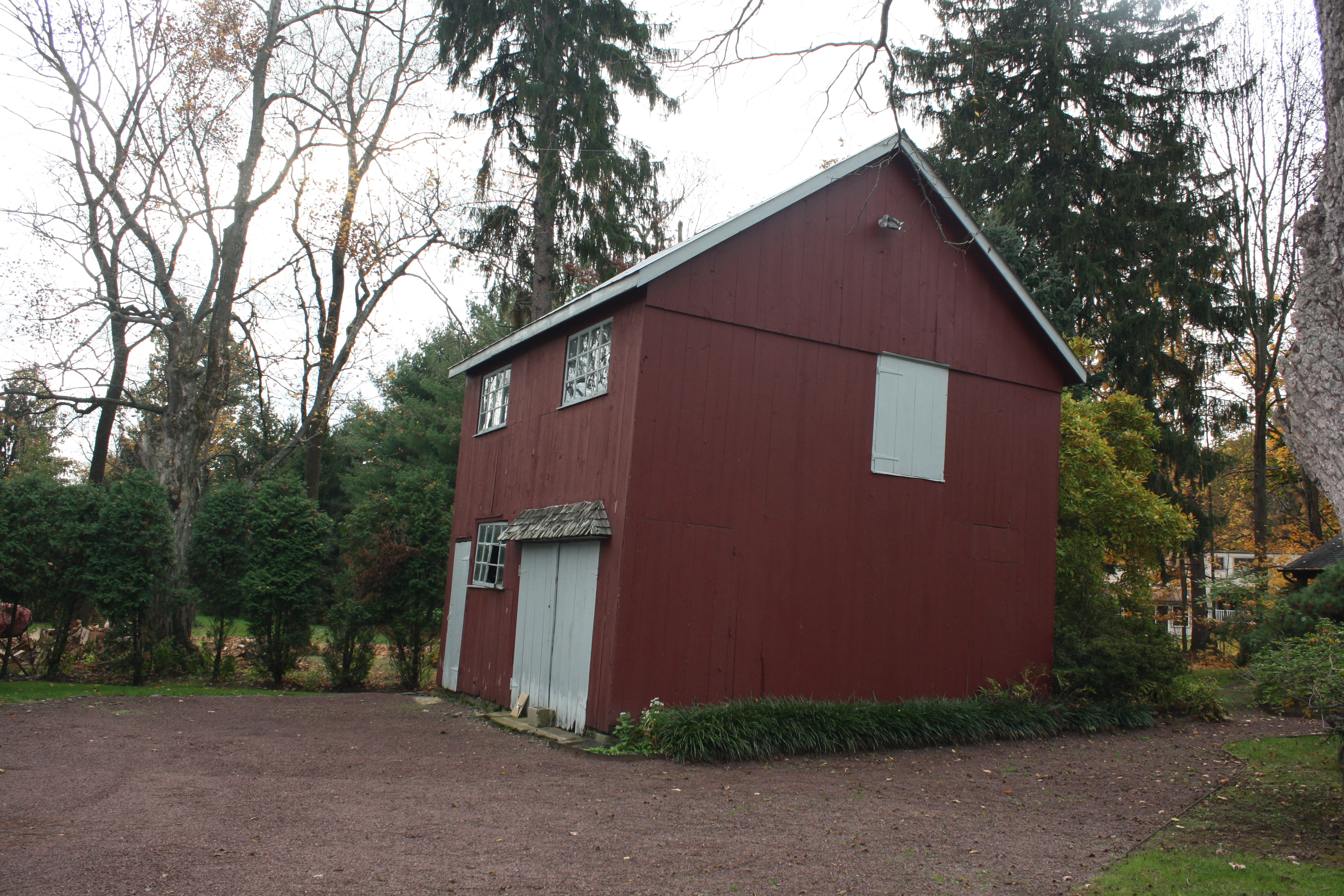

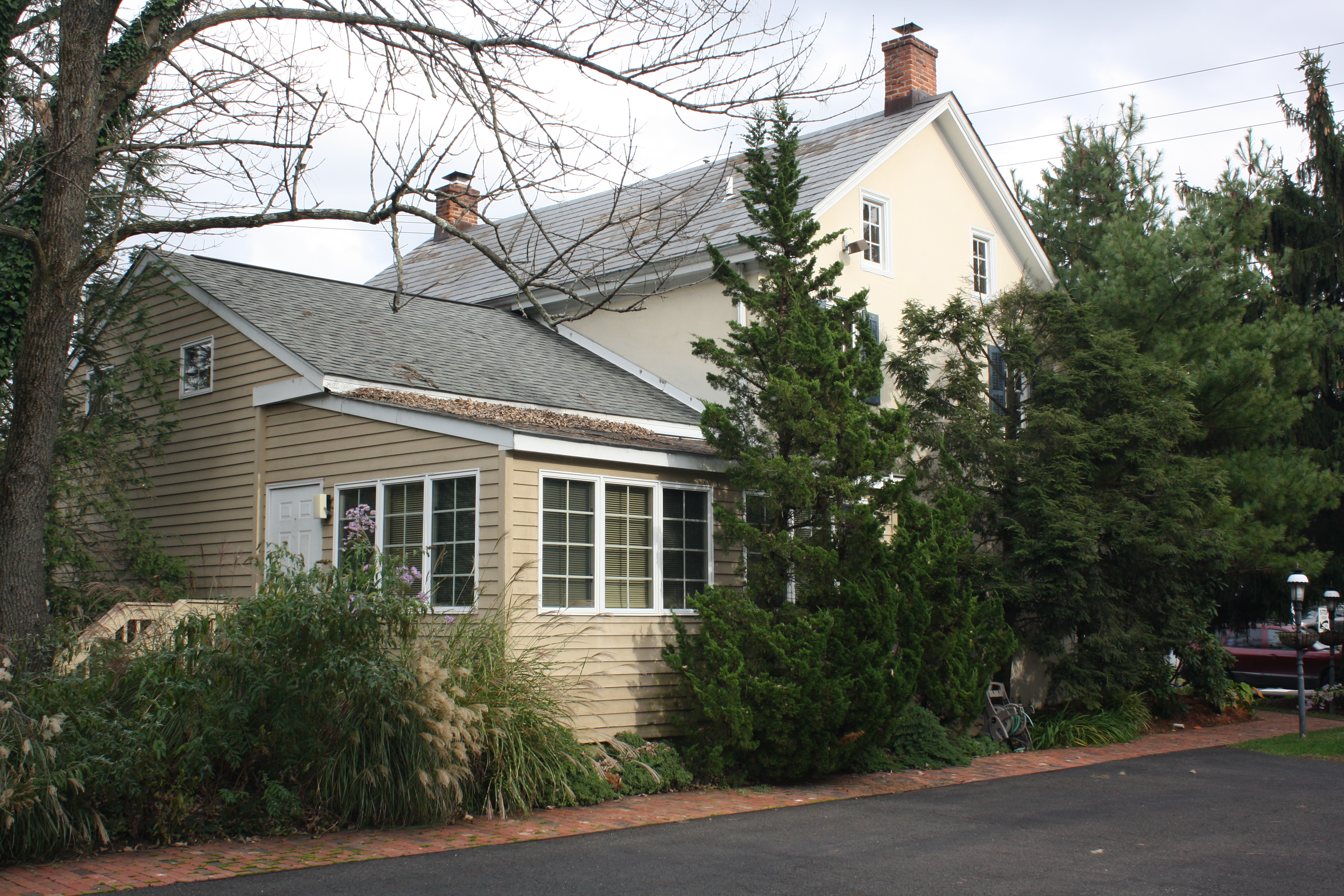

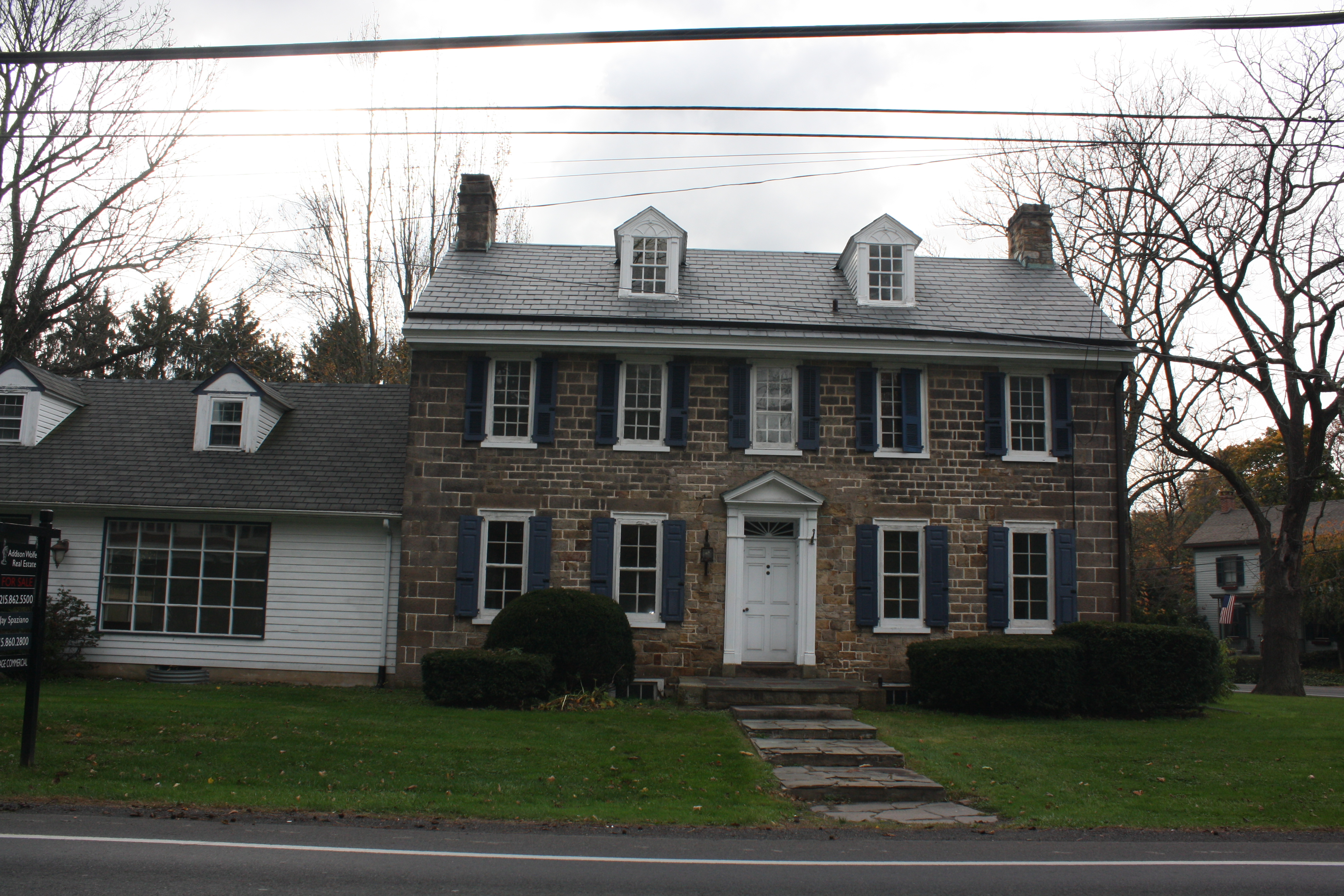

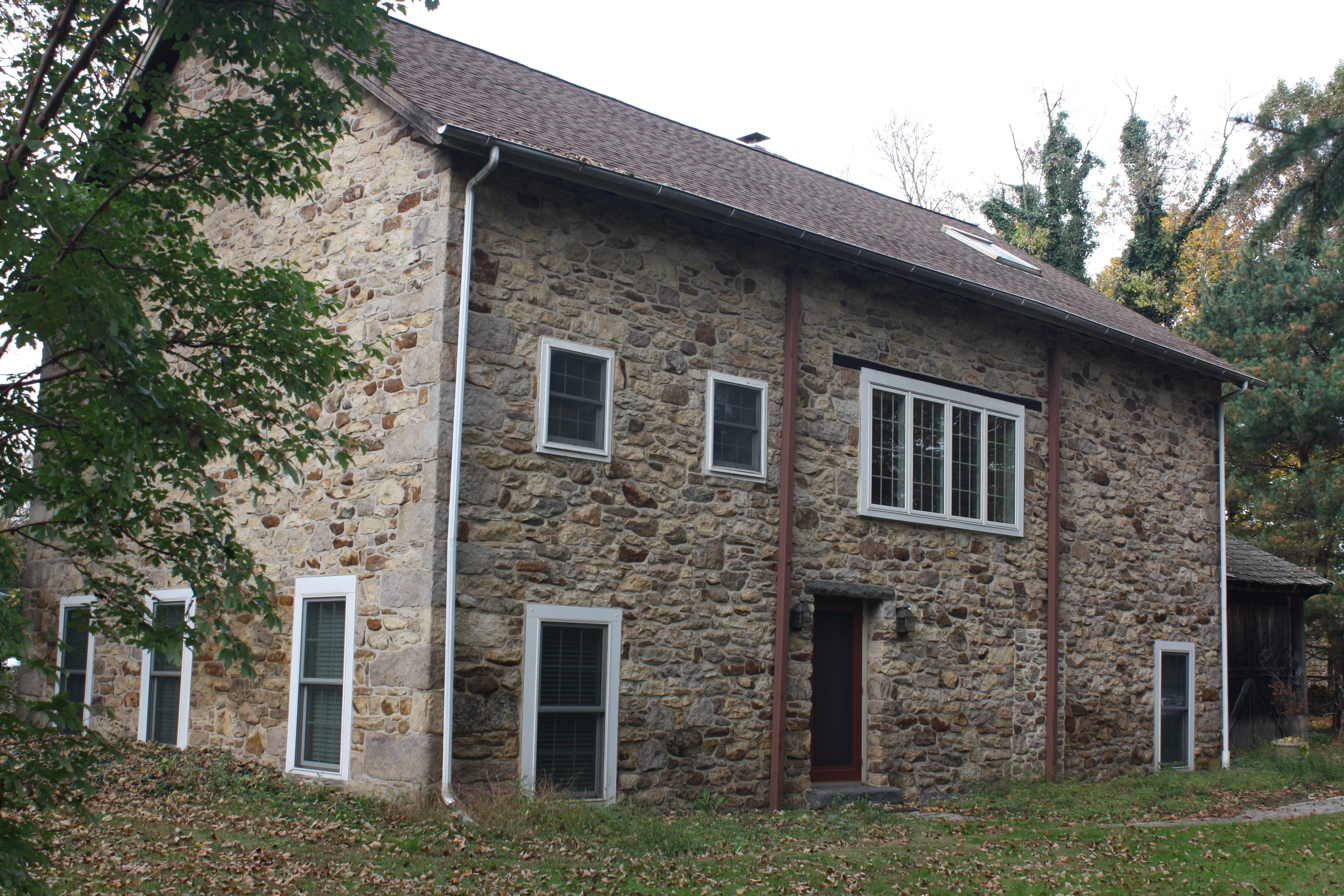
