= Mechanicsville, Bucks County, Pennsylvania =

Unincorporated community in Pennsylvania, US

Mechanicsville, Pennsylvania
- Unincorporated community
- Location within Pennsylvania Location within the United States
- Coordinates: 40°20′38″N 75°4′29″W
- Country: United States
- State: Pennsylvania
- County: Bucks
- Township: Buckingham
- Elevation: 443 ft (135 m)
- Time zone: UTC-5 (Eastern (EST))
  - Summer (DST): UTC-4 (EDT)
- ZIP Code: 18934
- Area codes: 215, 267 and 445
- GNIS feature ID: 1204145

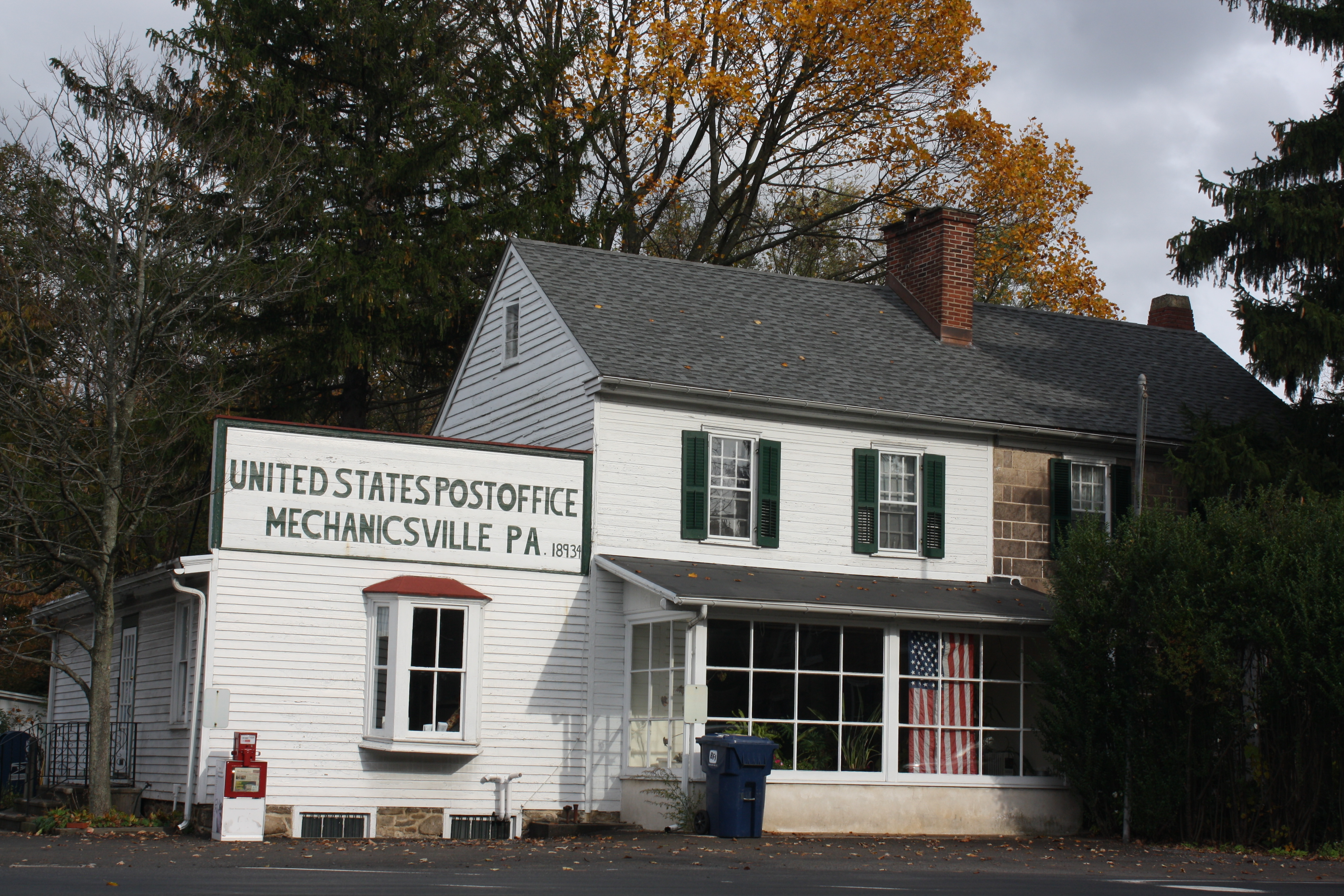
Mechanicsville post office

Mechanicsville is an unincorporated community in Buckingham Township in Bucks County, Pennsylvania, United States. Mechanicsville is located at the intersection of Pennsylvania Route 413 and Mechanicsville Road.
