= William Kitchen House =

Historic house in Pennsylvania, United States

- U.S. National Register of Historic Places
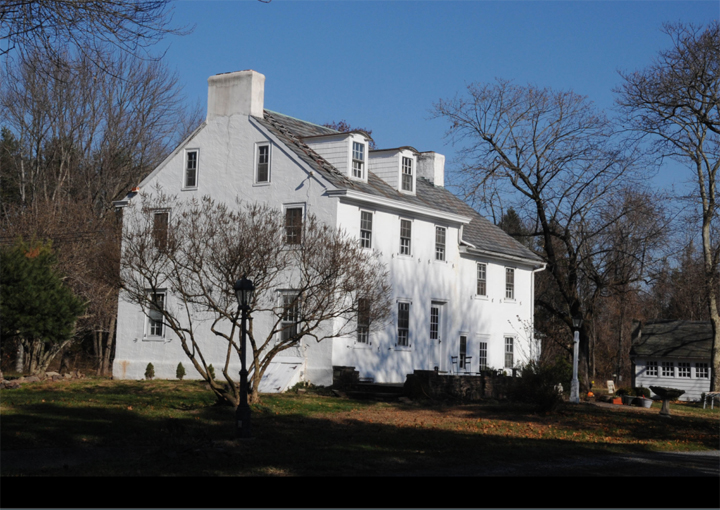
- The William Kitchen House in 2011

- Location within Pennsylvania Location within the United States
- Location: 332 S. Sugan Rd., New Hope, Pennsylvania
- Coordinates: 40°21′6″N 74°57′50″W
- Area: 4.3 acres (1.7 ha)
- MPS: New Hope MRA
- NRHP reference No.: 85000464
- Added to NRHP: March 6, 1985

William Kitchen House is a historic home located at New Hope, Bucks County, Pennsylvania. The house consists of three sections; the oldest built about 1770 and flanked by the second and third sections. The first and second sections are 2 1/2 stories tall and constructed of stuccoed stone and has a gable roof. The third section was added in the 20th century and is 1 1/2 stories tall.

It was added to the National Register of Historic Places in 1985.
