= Spring Valley Historic District =

Historic district in Pennsylvania, United States

- U.S. National Register of Historic Places
- U.S. Historic district
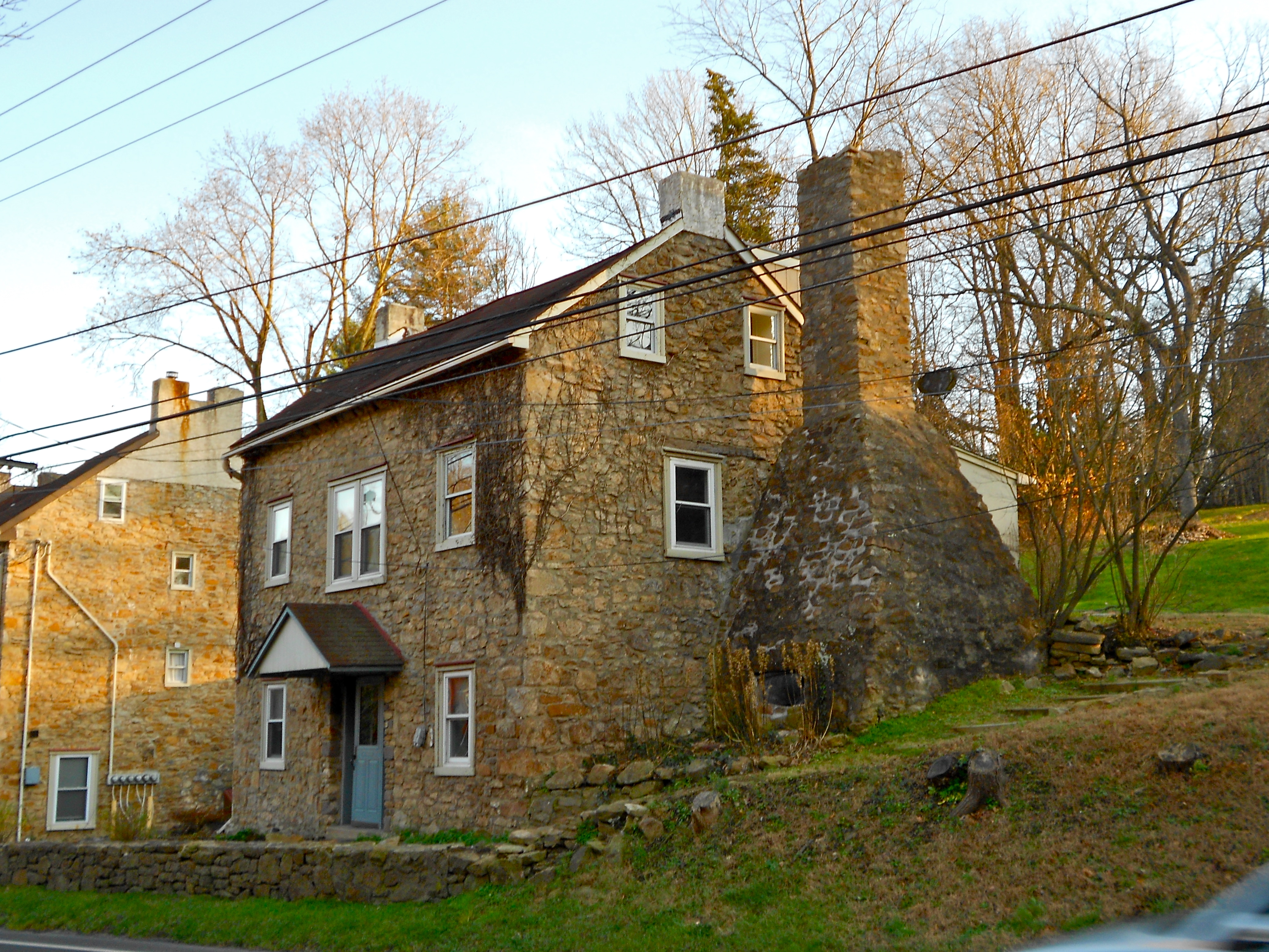
- House in the Spring Valley Historic District, December 2011

- Location within Pennsylvania Location within the United States
- Location: Mill Road and U.S. Route 202, Buckingham Township, Pennsylvania
- Coordinates: 40°19′07″N 75°04′59″W
- Area: 40.5 acres (16.4 ha)
- Architectural style: Georgian, Federal
- NRHP reference No.: 88000140
- Added to NRHP: January 7, 1988

The Spring Valley Historic District, also known as Mechanic's Valley, is a national historic district that is located in Buckingham Township, Bucks County, Pennsylvania.

It was added to the National Register of Historic Places in 1988.

== History and architectural features ==
This district includes thirty-two contributing buildings, one contributing site, and two contributing structures that are located in the crossroads village of Spring Valley. They include a variety of residential, commercial, and institutional buildings, some of which are representative of the vernacular Georgian and Federal styles.

The residential buildings are predominantly two-and-one-half-story, stuccoed stone structures, some of which date to the mid-eighteenth century. Notable buildings include the Upper Mill or Spring Valley Mill (c. 1740), the Lower Mill (c. 1820), a blacksmith and wheelwright shop, a cooperage, a store, and two inns—the "Neff's Tavern" and Temperance Inn (c. 1838). The contributing structures are the Spring Valley Mill Dam and a stone arch bridge.
