= Forest Grove Historic District =

Historic district in Pennsylvania, United States

- U.S. National Register of Historic Places
- U.S. Historic district
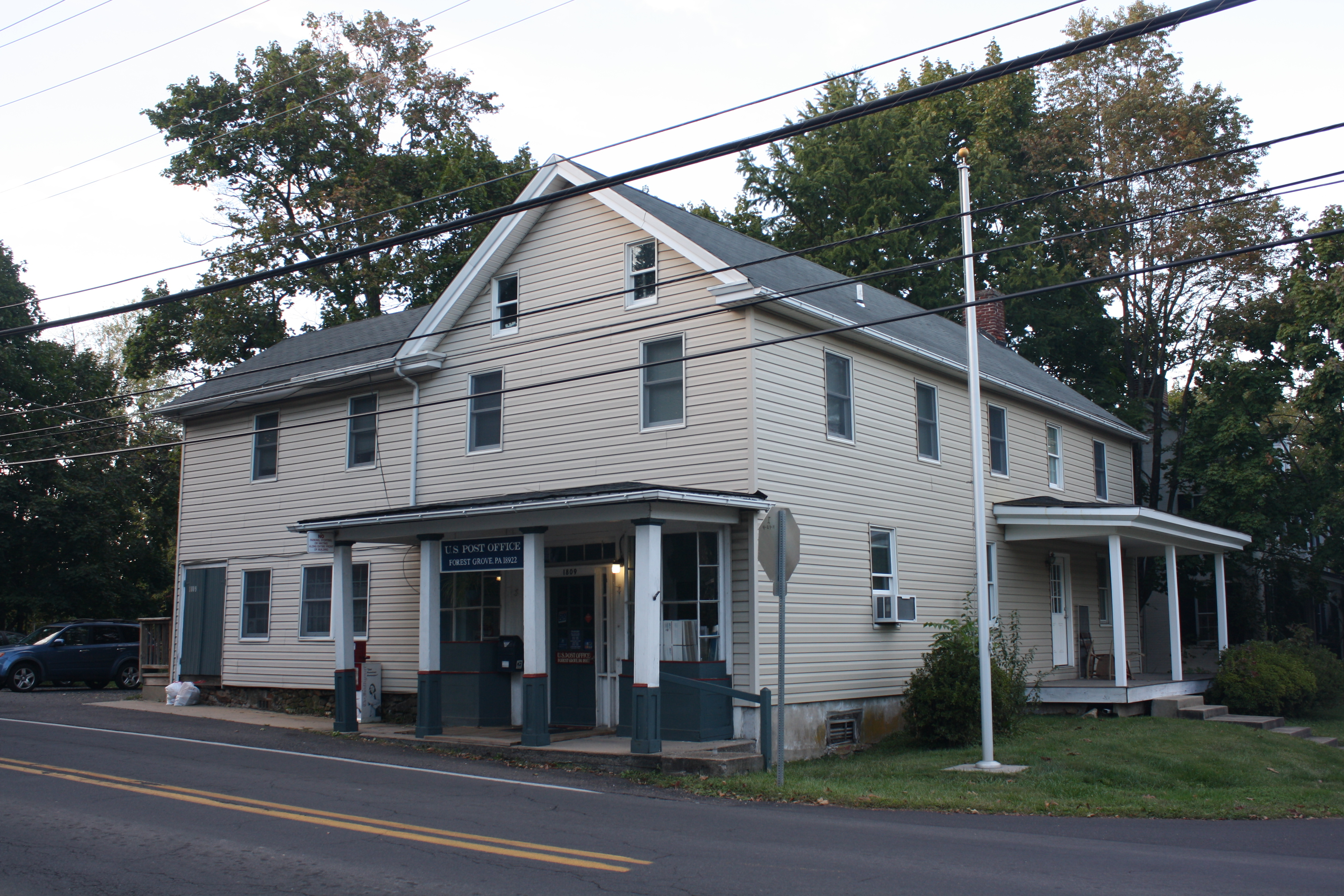
- U.S. Post Office, Forest Grove Historic District, October 2012

- Location within Pennsylvania Location within the United States
- Location: Forest Grove and Lower Mountain Roads, Buckingham Township, Pennsylvania
- Coordinates: 40°17′34″N 75°03′39″W
- Area: 34 acres (14 ha)
- NRHP reference No.: 82003765
- Added to NRHP: April 20, 1982

Forest Grove Historic District is a national historic district located in Buckingham Township, Bucks County, Pennsylvania. The district includes 46 contributing buildings in the community of Forest Grove. They include a variety of residential, commercial, and institutional buildings. The residential buildings are of vernacular design and include a variety of lower and middle income dwellings, some of which date to the late 1700s. Notable buildings include the William Kirk Store, Freyling's Hall (1920s), Odd Fellows Hall, and Presbyterian Church (1855).

It was added to the National Register of Historic Places in 1982.
