= Buckingham, Pennsylvania =

Unincorporated community in Pennsylvania, US

- Unincorporated community
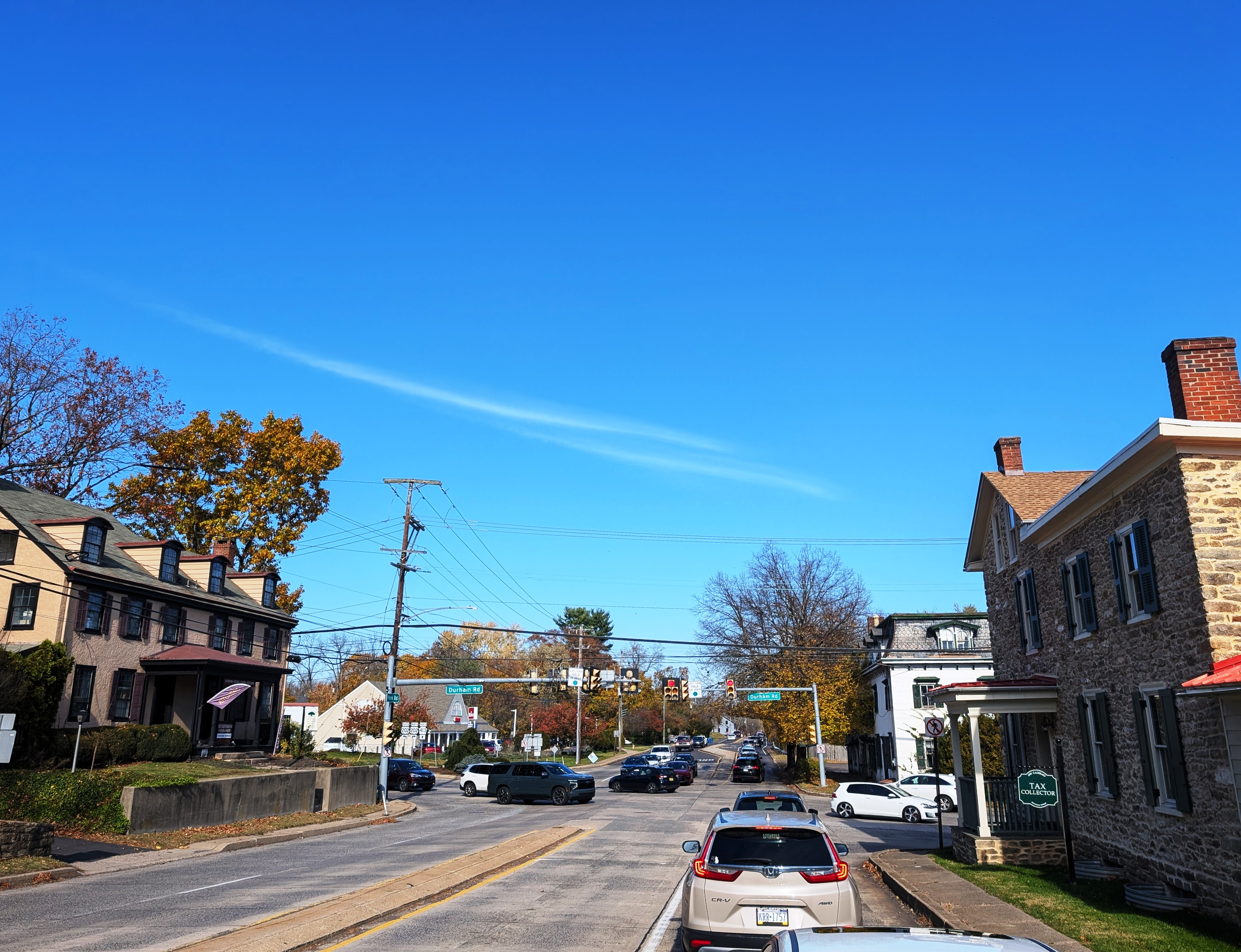
- PA 263 at PA 413 in Buckingham

- Location within Pennsylvania Location within the United States
- Coordinates: 40°19′25″N 75°3′36″W
- Country: United States
- State: Pennsylvania
- County: Bucks
- Township: Buckingham
- Elevation: 230 ft (70 m)
- Time zone: UTC-5 (Eastern (EST))
  - Summer (DST): UTC-4 (EDT)
- ZIP Code: 18912
- Area codes: 215, 267, and 445
- GNIS feature ID: 1170567

Buckingham is an unincorporated community in Buckingham Township in Bucks County, Pennsylvania, United States. Buckingham is located at the intersection of U.S. Route 202, Pennsylvania Route 263, and Pennsylvania Route 413.
