= Holicong, Pennsylvania =

Unincorporated community in Pennsylvania, US

- Populated place
- Location of Holicong in Pennsylvania Holicong (the United States)
- Coordinates: 40°20′08″N 75°02′51″W
- Country: United States
- State: Pennsylvania
- County: Bucks
- Township: Buckingham
- Elevation: 236 ft (72 m)
- Time zone: UTC-5 (Eastern (EST))
  - Summer (DST): UTC-4 (EDT)
- ZIP code: 18928
- Area codes: 215, 267 and 445
- FIPS code: 42-35152
- GNIS feature ID: 1177196

Holicong is a populated place situated in Buckingham Township in Bucks County, Pennsylvania. It has an estimated elevation of 236 feet (72 m) above sea level.

The name Holicong is Native American in origin.
