= Brock Creek (Buck Creek tributary) =

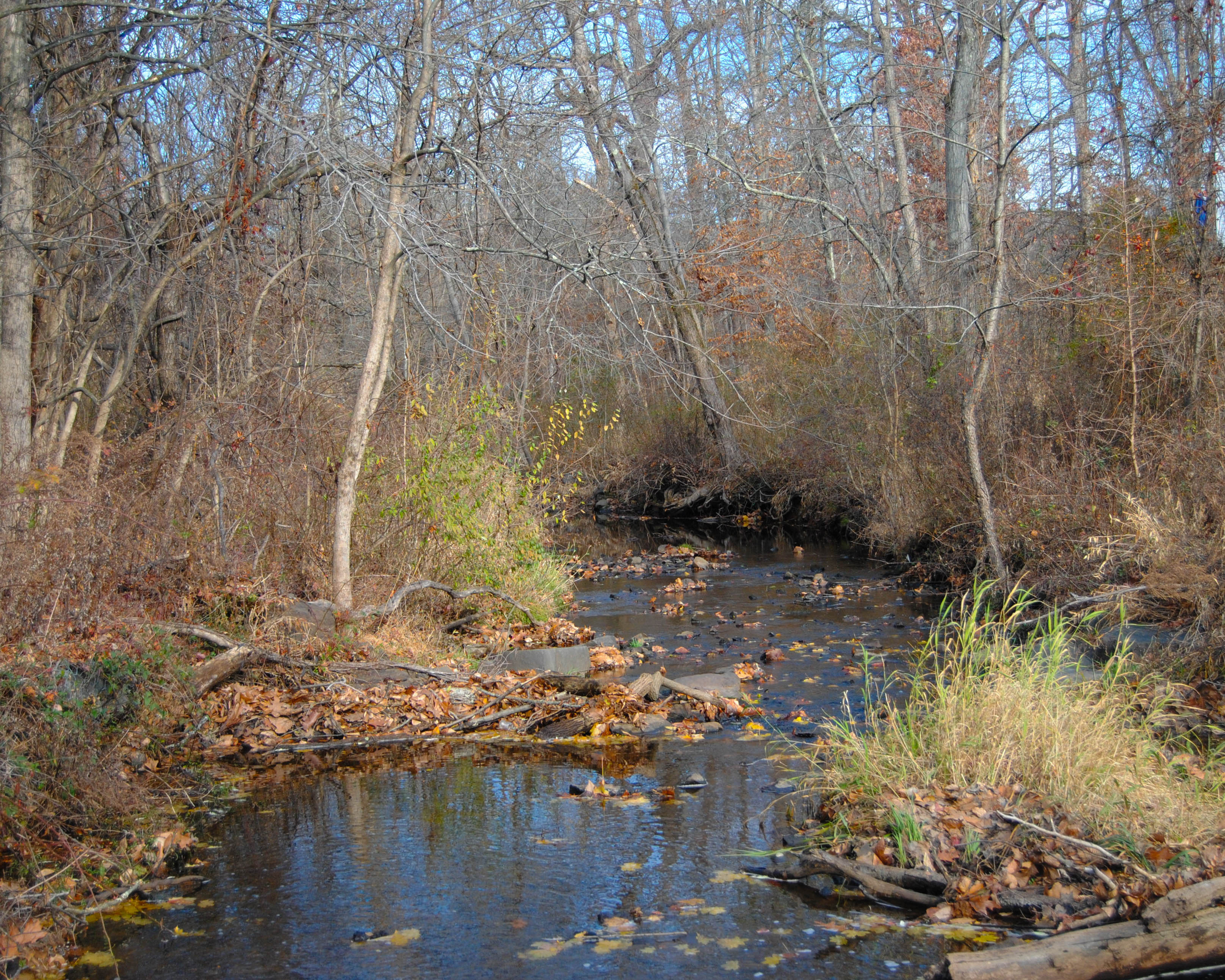
- Brock Creek in Yardley, Pennsylvania

- Brock Creek

Location
- Country: United States
- State: Pennsylvania
- County: Bucks
- Township: Lower Makefield
- Borough: Yardley

Physical characteristics
- Source
  - coordinates: 40°12′40″N 74°52′35″W
  - elevation: 140 feet (43 m)
- Mouth
  - coordinates: 40°14′33″N 74°50′41″W
  - elevation: 49 feet (15 m)
- Length: 3.34 miles (5.38 km)
- Basin size: 4.29 square miles (11.1 km^{2})

Basin features
- Progression: Brock Creek → Buck Creek → Delaware River → Delaware Bay
- River system: Delaware River
- Bridges: Covington Road; Covington Road (second bridge); Heacock Road; Stony Hill Road; Edgewood Road; Sandy Run Road; Pennsylvania Route 332 (West Afton Avenue)
- Slope: 27.25 feet per mile (5.161 m/km)

Brock Creek is a tributary of Buck Creek, rising in Lower Makefield Township, Bucks County, Pennsylvania, and meets its confluence at Buck Creek's 0.60 river mile in Yardley Borough.

== Statistics ==
Brock Creek was entered into the Geographic Names Information System of the U.S. Geological Survey as identification number 1170304, U.S. Department of the Interior Geological Survey I.D. is 02946.

== Course ==
Brock Creek rises near the southwest corner of Lower Makefield Township just east of Interstate 95 at an elevation of 140 feet (43 m), flowing generally east then northeast, turning northerly before it enters Yardley Borough and meets at Buck Creek's 0.60 river mile at an elevation of 49 feet (15 m).

== Municipalities ==
- Bucks County
  - Lower Makefield Township
  - Yardley Borough

== Crossings and Bridges ==
Crossing	NBI Number	Length	Lanes	Spans	Material/Design	Built	Reconstructed	Latitude	Longitude
Covington Road	-	-	-	-	-	-	-	-	-
Covington Road	-	-	-	-	-	-	-	-	-
Heacock Road	-	-	-	-	-	-	-	-	-
Stony Hill Road	7305	7 metres (23 ft)	2	1	concrete tee beam	1926	-	40°12'53.1"N	74°51'29.9"W
Edgewood Road	7233	9 metres (30 ft)	2	1	concrete tee beam	1937	-	40°13'29"N	74°50'52"W
Sandy Run Road	-	-	-	-	-	-	-	-	-
Pennsylvania Route 332 (West Afton Avenue)	7012	13 metres (43 ft)	2	1	concrete tee beam	1961	-	40°14'27.8"N	74°50'43.17"W

== See also ==
- List of rivers of Pennsylvania
- List of rivers of the United States
- List of Delaware River tributaries
