= Buck Creek (Delaware River tributary) =

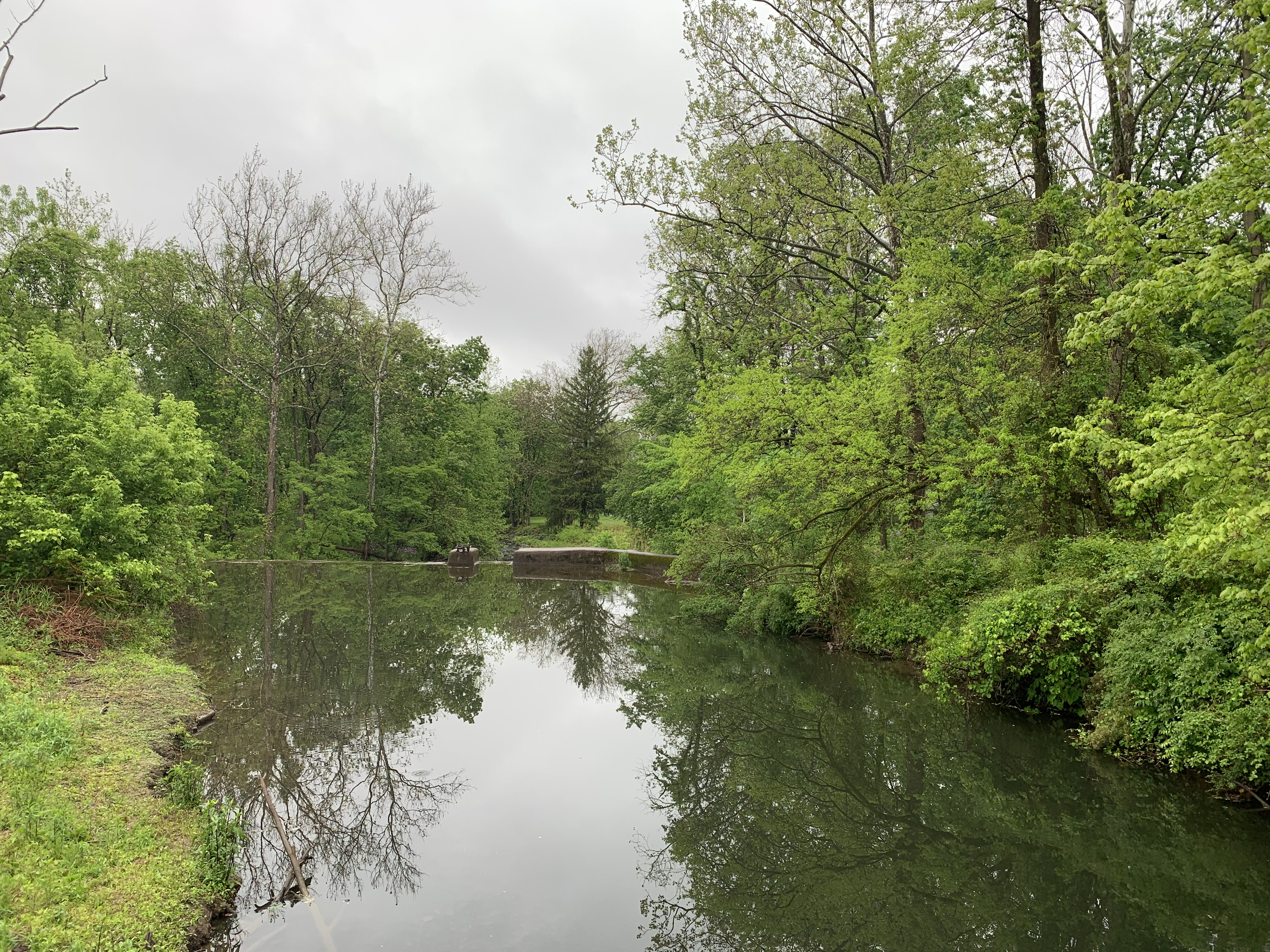
- Buck Creek (Delaware River) approaching a Dam in Yardley Pennsylvania, May 2020

- Buck Creek

Location
- Country: United States
- State: Pennsylvania
- County: Bucks
- Township: Lower Makefield
- Borough: Yardley

Physical characteristics
- Source
  - coordinates: 40°13′51″N 74°52′12″W
  - elevation: 110 feet (34 m)
- Mouth
  - location: Delaware River
  - coordinates: 40°14′42″N 74°50′12″W
  - elevation: 33 feet (10 m)
- Length: 1.9 miles (3.1 km)
- Basin size: 6.99 square miles (18.1 km^{2})

Basin features
- River system: Delaware River
- Tributaries
  - right: Brock Creek
- Bridges: Mirror Lake Road; Pennsylvania Route 332 (Yardley Newtown Road); North Main Street; Delaware Canal aqueduct and towpath Pennsylvania Route 32 (North Delaware Avenue, River Road)

Buck Creek is a tributary of the Delaware River, rising in Lower Makefield Township, Bucks County, Pennsylvania and meeting its confluence at the Delaware River's 138.00 river mile.

== Statistics ==
Buck Creek was entered into the Geographic Names Information System of the U.S. Geological Survey on 2 August 1979 as identification number 1170509, U.S. Department of the Interior Geological Survey I.D. is 02944.

== Course ==
Mirror Lake Road passes between two small unnamed lakes at an elevation of 110 feet (34 m), the head waters of Buck Creek. The creek runs easterly for about 0.25 miles (0.40 km) then turns northerly for about 0.5 miles (0.80 km), then slowly curves to the east receiving an unnamed tributary from the left, entering Yardley Borough, receiving Brock Creek from the right, then meeting with the Delaware River at its 138 river mile at an elevation of 33 feet (10 m), resulting in an average slope of 40.52 feet per mile (7.674 m/km).

== Municipalities ==
- Bucks County
  - Lower Makefield Township
  - Yardley Borough

== Crossings and Bridges ==
Crossing	NBI Number	Length	Lanes	Spans	Material/Design	Built	Reconstructed	Latitude	Longitude
Mirror Lake Road	-	-	-	-	-	-	-	-	-
Pennsylvania Route 332 (Yardley Newtown Road)	-	-	-	-	-	-	-	-	-
Schultz Lane	-	-	-	-	-	-	-	-	-
North Main Street	7313	20 metres (66 ft)	2	2	continuous concrete stringer/multi-beam or girder	1931	-	40°14'38.9"N	74°50'29"W
Delaware Canal Brock Creek Aqueduct	-	-	-	-	-	-	-	-	-
Pennsylvania Route 32 (North Delaware Avenue, River Road)	6784	21 metres (69 ft)	2	1	steel stringer/multi-beam or girder	1932	1980	40°14'42.5"N	74°50'12.7"W

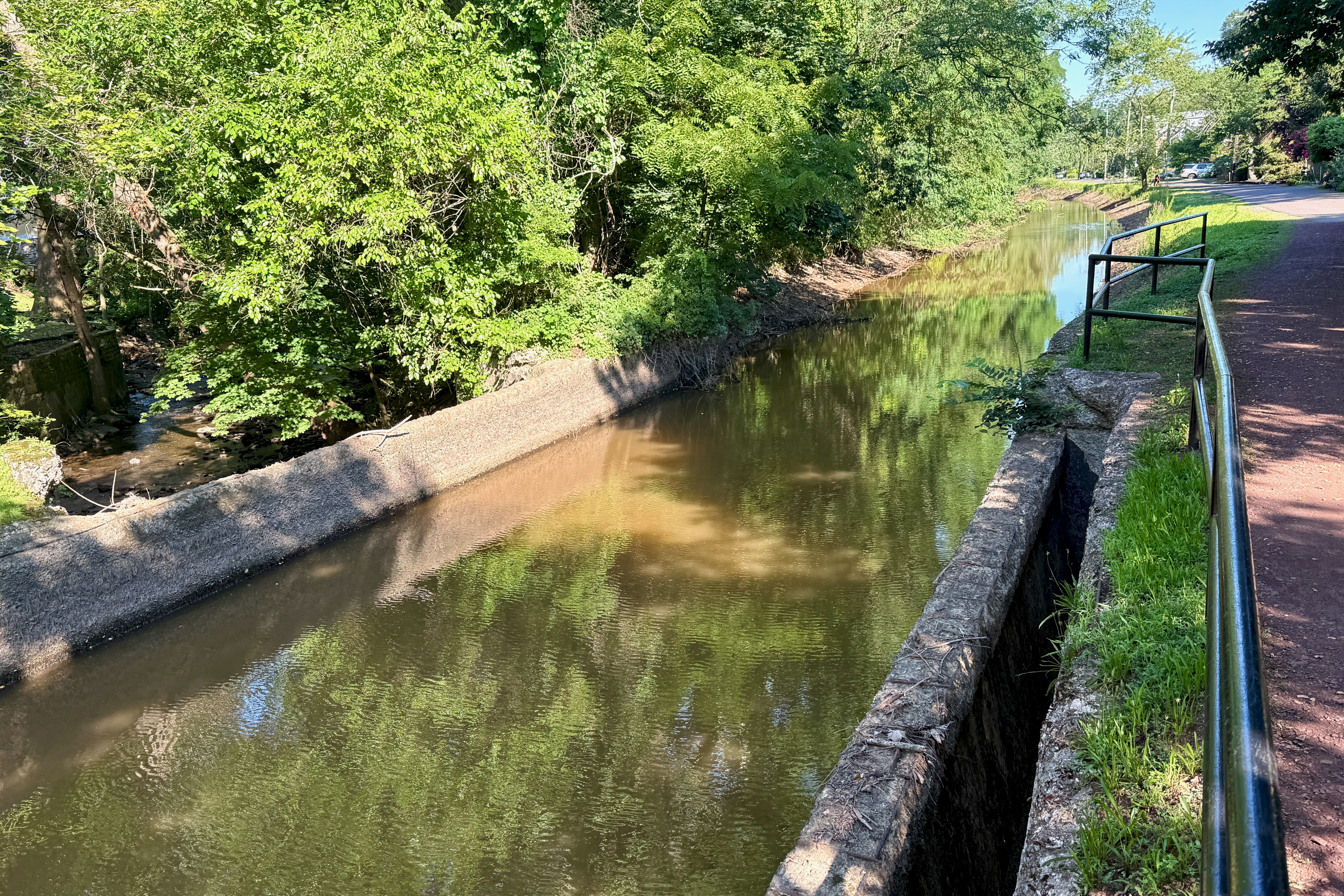
Brock Creek Aqueduct

== See also ==
- List of rivers of Pennsylvania
- List of rivers of the United States
- List of Delaware River tributaries
