= Dolington, Pennsylvania =

Unincorporated community in Pennsylvania, US

- Unincorporated community
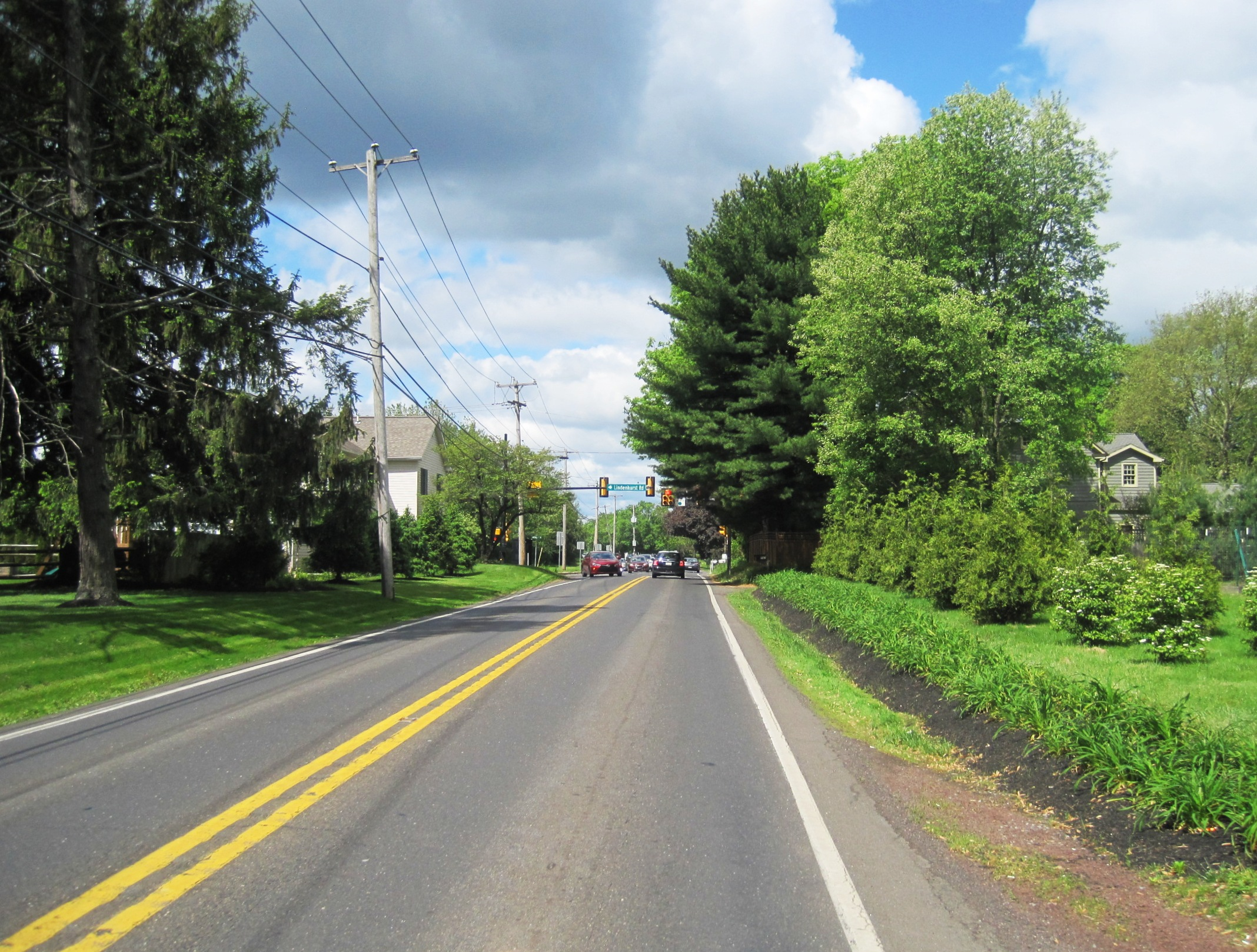
- Southbound PA 532 approaching Lindenhurst Road

- Location within Pennsylvania Location within the United States
- Coordinates: 40°15′54″N 74°53′44″W
- Country: United States
- State: Pennsylvania
- County: Bucks
- Township: Upper Makefield
- Elevation: 259 ft (79 m)
- Time zone: UTC-5 (Eastern (EST))
  - Summer (DST): UTC-4 (EDT)
- ZIP Code: 18940
- Area codes: 215, 267 and 445
- GNIS feature ID: 1203431

Dolington is an unincorporated community in Upper Makefield Township in Bucks County, Pennsylvania, United States. Dolington is located at the intersection of Pennsylvania Route 532 and Dolington Road.

== See also ==
- Dolington Village Historic District
