= Ivyland, Pennsylvania =

Borough in Pennsylvania, US

- Borough
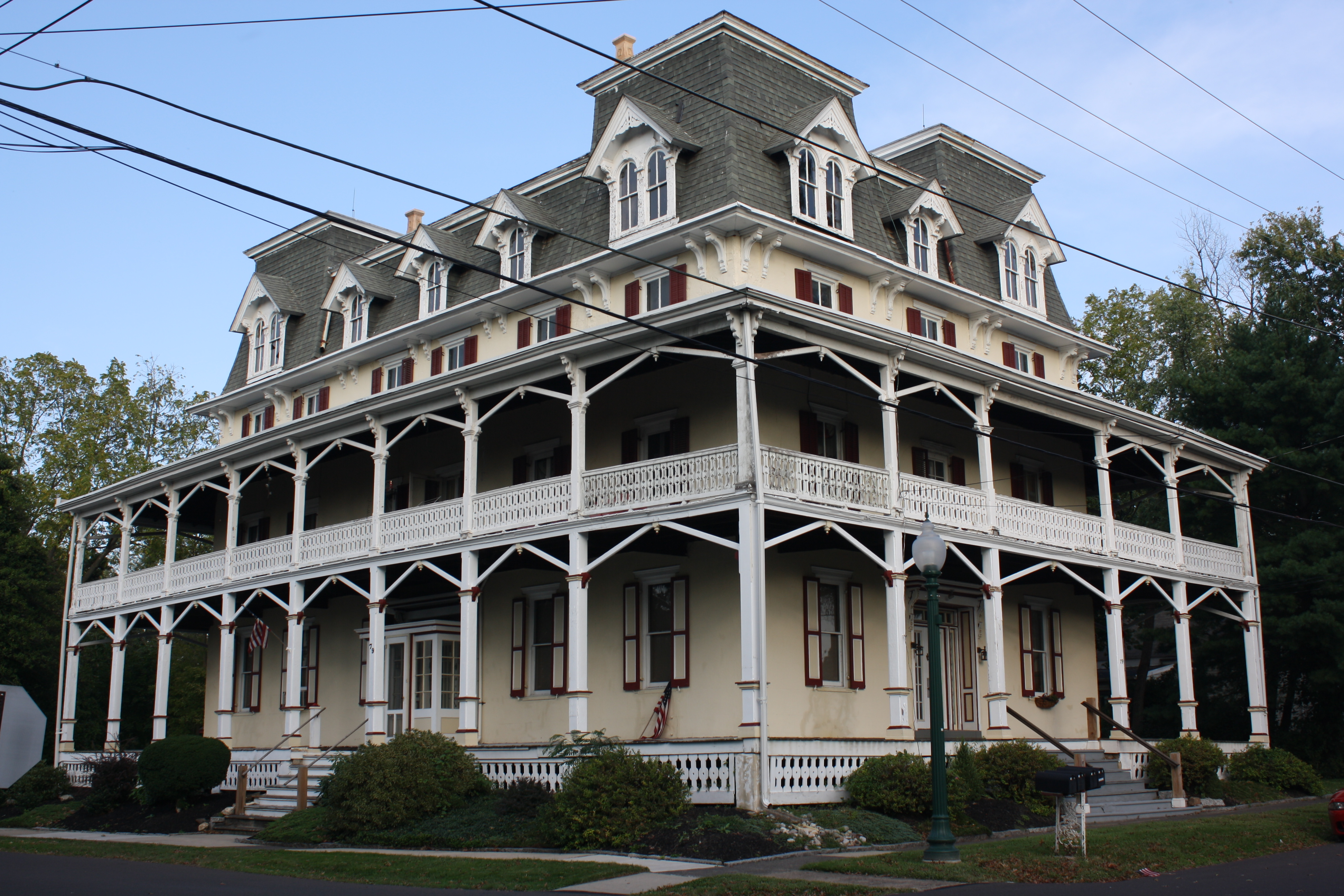
- Temperance House Hotel

- Seal

- Location of Ivyland in Bucks County, Pennsylvania.

- Location of Ivyland in Pennsylvania Ivyland (the United States)
- Coordinates: 40°12′32″N 75°04′19″W
- Country: United States
- State: Pennsylvania
- County: Bucks

Government
  - Mayor: Tony Judice

Area
  - Total: 0.36 sq mi (0.92 km^{2})
  - Land: 0.36 sq mi (0.92 km^{2})
  - Water: 0 sq mi (0.00 km^{2})
- Elevation: 299 ft (91 m)

Population (2020)
  - Total: 955
  - Density: 2,693.5/sq mi (1,039.98/km^{2})
- Time zone: UTC-5 (Eastern (EST))
  - Summer (DST): UTC-4 (EDT)
- ZIP Code: 18974
- Area codes: 215, 267 and 445
- FIPS code: 42-37304
- Website: www.ivylandborough.org

Ivyland is a borough in Bucks County, Pennsylvania, United States. It is known for one of the finest collections of Victorian buildings in the state, most of which are registered with the National Register of Historic Places. As of the 2020 census, Ivyland had a population of 955.

== Geography ==
Ivyland is located at 40°12′32″N 75°4′19″W (40.208908, -75.071946). According to the U.S. Census Bureau, the borough has a total area of 0.3 square miles (0.78 km^{2}), all land, making it the smallest borough in Bucks County.

The east end of Ivyland was once a separate village named Bradyville.

== History ==
Ivyland was founded in 1873 by Edwin Lacey, a Quaker who was related to John Lacey, a brigadier general in the American Revolution. Edwin Lacey purchased 40 acres (16 ha) of land between Jacksonville Road (today's PA 332) and the Reading Company's future New Hope rail line, today's New Hope Railroad, which was completed to New Hope in 1891. It, as well as a large hotel which was planned for the town, was intended to serve the centennial of the signing of the Declaration of Independence.

According to the borough's website, Edwin Lacey, who apparently was no botanist, named the town for the vast amount of "ivy" growing in the area, which turned out to be poison ivy.

The railroad line from the county line to Bristol Road opened November 9, 1874. Samuel Davis quarried the stone for the bed and for a bridge over a local stream, supplied horses and carts for the grading, and boarded the construction workers. In return, he took payment as stocks and bonds, and was also offered a lifetime pass on the railroad. He is reported to have stated "I never knew dividends to be paid out of passes. I have asked friends to put their money in this railroad, promising them interest on their investment, and I can't let them down. Furthermore, if I cannot afford to pay my way on the train, I had better stay home."

The first post office was opened October 26, 1889, Wilmer Carr, postmaster.

Ivyland was incorporated as a borough in 1903.

Passenger rail service was cut off in 1952 by the Reading, which later sold that portion of the rail line to the New Hope and Ivyland Railroad in 1966.

The Ivyland Historic District was added to the National Register of Historic Places in 2002.

== Demographics ==
Historical population
Census	Pop.	Note	%±
1880	173		—
1910	247		—
1920	263		6.5%
1930	307		16.7%
1940	318		3.6%
1950	358		12.6%
1960	425		18.7%
1970	600		41.2%
1980	661		10.2%
1990	490		−25.9%
2000	492		0.4%
2010	1,041		111.6%
2020	955		−8.3%

As of the 2010 census, the borough was 88.3% White, 0.4% Black or African American, 7.8% Asian, and 2.0% were two or more races. 2.4% of the population were of Hispanic or Latino ancestry .

As of the census of 2000, there were 492 people, 194 households, and 152 families residing in the borough. The population density was 1,600.3 inhabitants per square mile (617.9/km^{2}). There were 199 housing units at an average density of 647.3 per square mile (249.9/km^{2}). The racial makeup of the borough was 95.53% White, 1.02% Native American, 2.85% Asian, 0.20% from other races, and 0.41% from two or more races. Hispanic or Latino of any race were 1.83% of the population.

There were 194 households, out of which 32.0% had children under the age of 18 living with them, 62.9% were married couples living together, 13.4% had a female householder with no husband present, and 21.6% were non-families. 19.1% of all households were made up of individuals, and 7.7% had someone living alone who was 65 years of age or older. The average household size was 2.52 and the average family size was 2.83.

In the borough, the population was spread out, with 21.1% under the age of 18, 6.9% from 18 to 24, 31.1% from 25 to 44, 26.0% from 45 to 64, and 14.8% who were 65 years of age or older. The median age was 39 years. For every 100 females, there were 90.7 males. For every 100 females age 18 and over, there were 86.5 males.

The median income for a household in the borough was $58,958, and the median income for a family was $63,750. Males had a median income of $43,750 versus $36,136 for females. The per capita income for the borough was $26,525. About 2.1% of families and 3.6% of the population were below the poverty line, including 4.0% of those under age 18 and 5.0% of those age 65 or over.

== "Old" Ivyland vs "New" Ivyland ==
Ivyland Borough recently acquired a newly built community. The new community, Ivyland Village, was developed by Judd Builders and added a multitude of single family homes, as well as townhouses. Judd had strict requirements in building in order not to detract from the "Old" Ivyland style.

=== "New" Ivyland Borders ===
Ivyland Village is on the east side of State Route 332 (Jacksonville Road) and is bordered by Johnsville Boulevard, Kirk Road, and the Ann's Choice retirement community.

== Climate ==
According to the Köppen climate classification system, Ivyland has a Hot-summer, Humid continental climate (Dfa). Dfa climates are characterized by at least one month having an average mean temperature ≤ 32.0 °F (0.0 °C), at least four months with an average mean temperature ≥ 50.0 °F (10.0 °C), at least one month with an average mean temperature ≥ 71.6 °F (22.0 °C) and no significant precipitation difference between seasons. Although most summer days are slightly humid in Ivyland, episodes of heat and high humidity can occur with heat index values > 107 °F (42 °C). Since 1981, the highest air temperature was 102.5 °F (39.2 °C) on July 22, 2011, and the highest daily average mean dew point was 75.2 °F (24.0 °C) on August 12, 2016. The average wettest month is July, which corresponds with the annual peak in thunderstorm activity. Since 1981, the wettest calendar day was 6.80 inches (173 mm) on September 16, 1999. During the winter months, the average annual extreme minimum air temperature is 1.1 °F (−17.2 °C). Since 1981, the coldest air temperature was −10.3 °F (−23.5 °C) on January 22, 1984. Episodes of extreme cold and wind can occur, with wind chill values < −9 °F (−23 °C). The average annual snowfall (Nov-Apr) is between 24 inches (61 cm) and 30 inches (76 cm). Ice storms and large snowstorms depositing ≥ 12 inches (30 cm) of snow occur once every few years, particularly during nor’easters from December through February.

Climate data for Ivyland, Elevation 282 ft (86 m), 1981-2010 normals, extremes 1981-2018
Month	Jan	Feb	Mar	Apr	May	Jun	Jul	Aug	Sep	Oct	Nov	Dec	Year
Record high °F (°C)	71.0 (21.7)	77.5 (25.3)	86.8 (30.4)	93.6 (34.2)	94.7 (34.8)	95.7 (35.4)	102.5 (39.2)	100.0 (37.8)	97.6 (36.4)	88.8 (31.6)	80.8 (27.1)	75.3 (24.1)	102.5 (39.2)
Mean daily maximum °F (°C)	39.5 (4.2)	42.7 (5.9)	50.9 (10.5)	62.6 (17.0)	72.4 (22.4)	81.5 (27.5)	85.6 (29.8)	84.1 (28.9)	77.1 (25.1)	65.9 (18.8)	55.0 (12.8)	43.7 (6.5)	63.5 (17.5)
Daily mean °F (°C)	31.2 (−0.4)	33.9 (1.1)	41.4 (5.2)	52.1 (11.2)	61.7 (16.5)	71.1 (21.7)	75.6 (24.2)	74.2 (23.4)	66.9 (19.4)	55.2 (12.9)	45.6 (7.6)	35.7 (2.1)	53.8 (12.1)
Mean daily minimum °F (°C)	23.0 (−5.0)	25.2 (−3.8)	32.0 (0.0)	41.5 (5.3)	50.9 (10.5)	60.7 (15.9)	65.5 (18.6)	64.2 (17.9)	56.6 (13.7)	44.5 (6.9)	36.1 (2.3)	27.6 (−2.4)	44.1 (6.7)
Record low °F (°C)	−10.3 (−23.5)	−2.7 (−19.3)	3.6 (−15.8)	17.6 (−8.0)	34.3 (1.3)	42.2 (5.7)	48.8 (9.3)	43.2 (6.2)	36.2 (2.3)	24.6 (−4.1)	12.2 (−11.0)	−1.5 (−18.6)	−10.3 (−23.5)
Average precipitation inches (mm)	3.44 (87)	2.70 (69)	3.97 (101)	4.00 (102)	4.32 (110)	4.26 (108)	5.18 (132)	4.34 (110)	4.39 (112)	3.76 (96)	3.69 (94)	3.96 (101)	48.01 (1,219)
Average relative humidity (%)	66.4	62.9	58.9	57.8	62.1	66.3	67.3	69.3	70.5	69.8	67.9	68.4	65.7
Average dew point °F (°C)	21.3 (−5.9)	22.6 (−5.2)	28.1 (−2.2)	37.7 (3.2)	48.6 (9.2)	59.3 (15.2)	64.0 (17.8)	63.5 (17.5)	57.0 (13.9)	45.5 (7.5)	35.6 (2.0)	26.3 (−3.2)	42.6 (5.9)
Source: PRISM

== Transportation ==
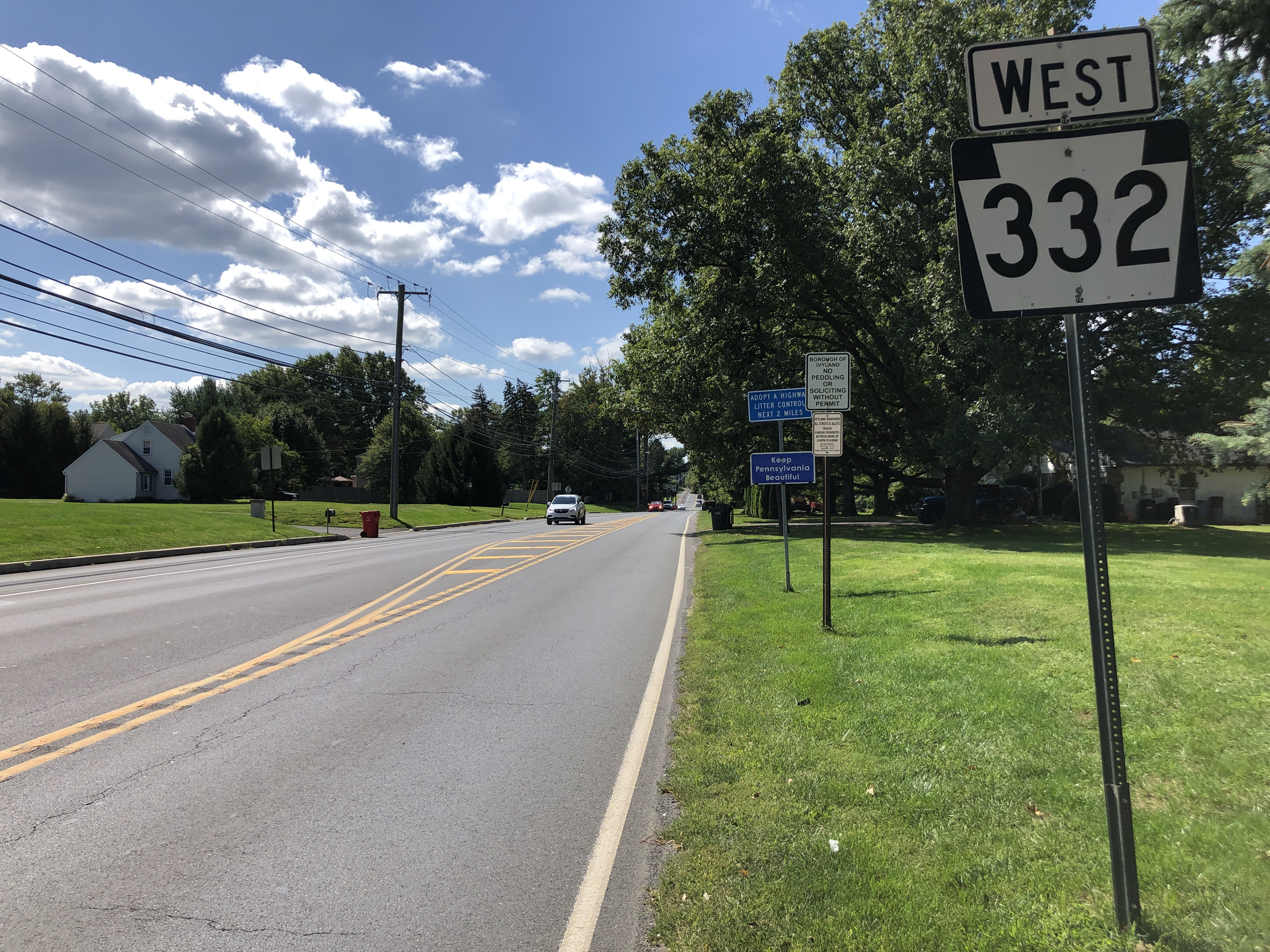
PA 332 westbound along the edge of Ivyland

As of 2007, there were 5.06 miles (8.14 km) of public roads in Ivyland, of which 1.19 miles (1.92 km) were maintained by the Pennsylvania Department of Transportation (PennDOT) and 3.87 miles (6.23 km) were maintained by the borough.

Pennsylvania Route 332 is the only numbered highway serving Ivyland. It follows Jacksonville Road along a northeast–southwest alignment on the southeastern side of the borough.

== Ecology ==
According to the A. W. Kuchler U.S. potential natural vegetation types, Ivyland would have a dominant vegetation type of Appalachian Oak (104) with a dominant vegetation form of Eastern Hardwood Forest (25). The plant hardiness zone is 7a with an average annual extreme minimum air temperature of 1.1 °F (−17.2 °C). The spring bloom typically begins by April 9 and fall color usually peaks by November 1.
