= Amos Palmer House (Langhorne, Pennsylvania) =

Historic house in Pennsylvania, United States

- U.S. National Register of Historic Places
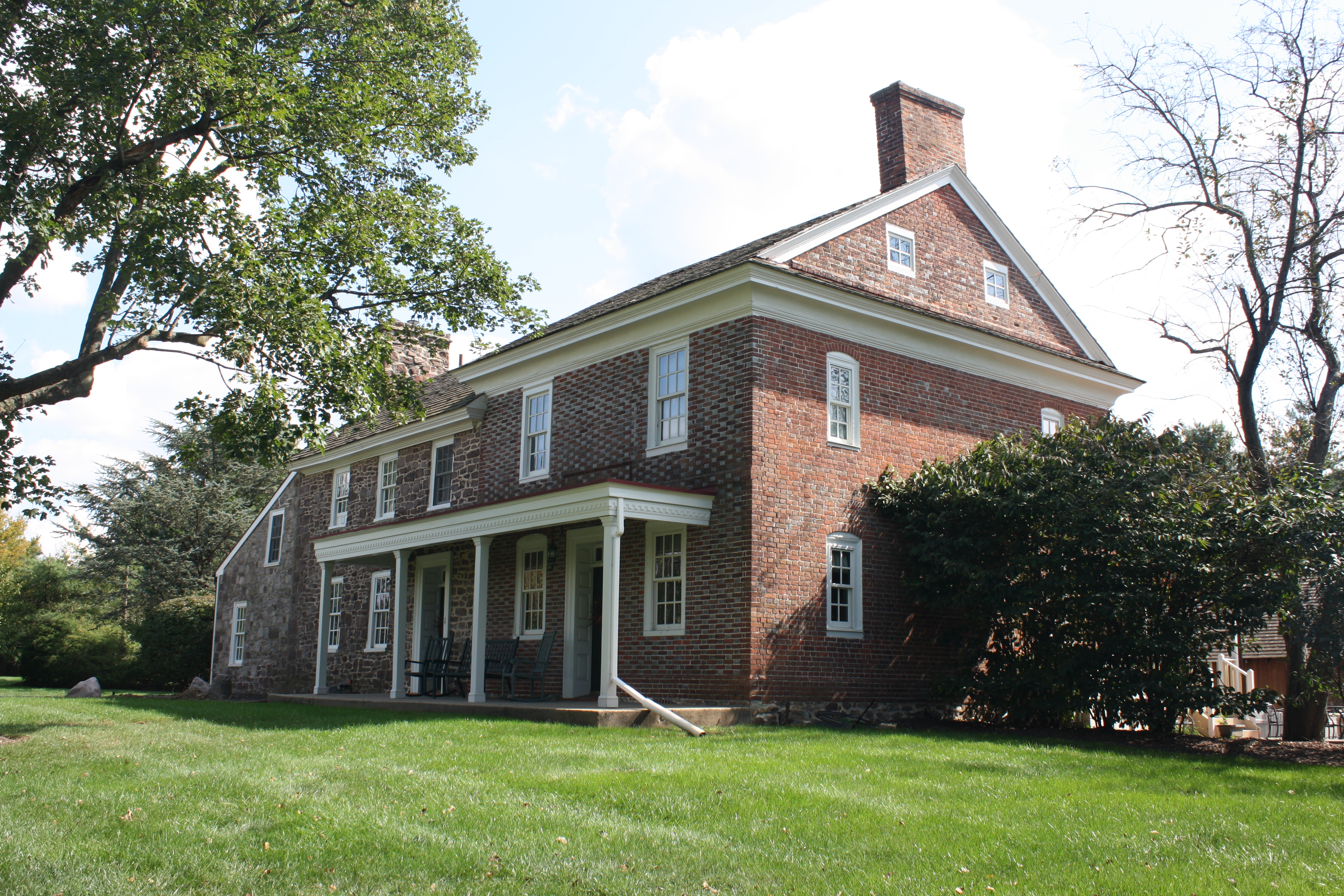
- Amos Palmer House. September 2012.

- Location within Pennsylvania Location within the United States
- Location: Township Line Rd., Lower Makefield Township, Pennsylvania
- Coordinates: 40°12′44″N 74°52′53″W
- Area: 0.5 acres (0.20 ha)
- Built: c. 1760, c. 1810, c. 1870, c. 1900, c. 1940-1980
- Architectural style: Georgian
- NRHP reference No.: 88002661
- Added to NRHP: November 18, 1988

Amos Palmer House is a historic farmhouse located in Lower Makefield Township, Bucks County, Pennsylvania. The original section was built about 1760, and is a two-story, double pile brick structure on a stone foundation. The house subsequently had four additions: a 2 1/2-story, single pile stone structure built about 1810; a 1 1/2-story, stone and rubble structure and frame shed roofed kitchen added about 1870; a two-story, frame kitchen addition built about 1900; and a small frame shed dated between about 1940 and 1980. The house is in the Georgian style.

It was added to the National Register of Historic Places in 1988.
