= Village of Edgewood Historic District =

Historic district in Pennsylvania, United States

- U.S. National Register of Historic Places
- U.S. Historic district
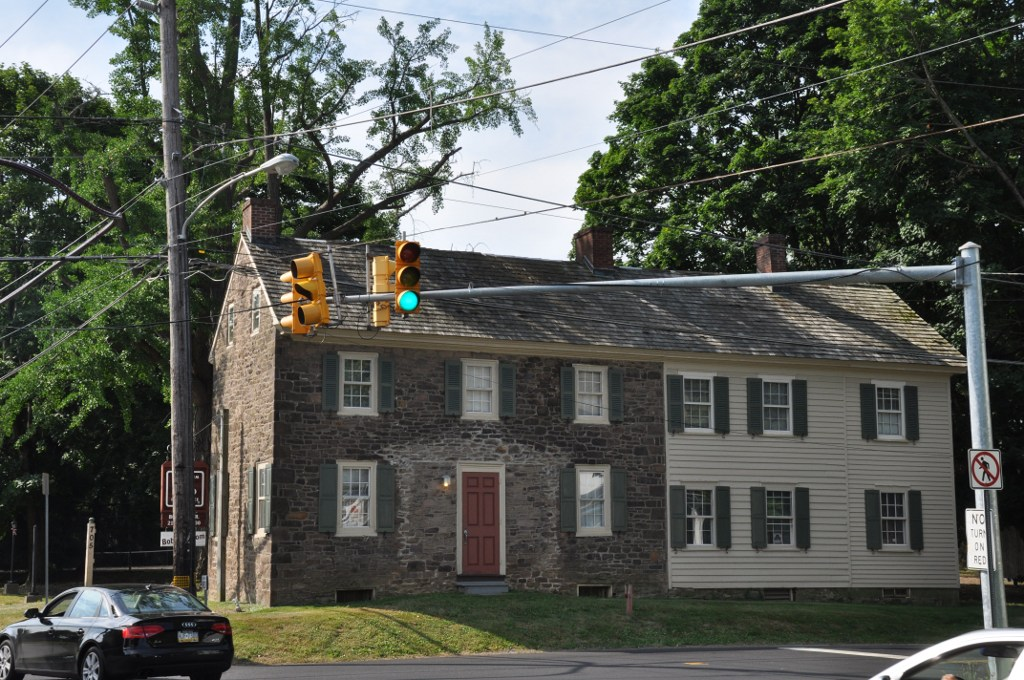
- House in the Village of Edgewood Historic District, July 2012

- Location within Pennsylvania Location within the United States
- Location: Yardley, Langhorne, Edgewood and Stony Hill Rds., Lower Makefield Township, Pennsylvania
- Coordinates: 40°13′22″N 74°52′31″W
- Area: 33.7 acres (13.6 ha)
- Architectural style: Late Victorian, Colonial
- NRHP reference No.: 80003433
- Added to NRHP: November 28, 1980

The Village of Edgewood Historic District is a national historic district that is located in Lower Makefield Township, Bucks County, Pennsylvania.

It was added to the National Register of Historic Places in 1980.

== History and architectural features ==
This district includes twenty-eight contributing buildings that are located in the crossroads village of Edgewood. They include a variety of residential, commercial, and institutional buildings, some of which are representative of the Late Victorian style. Notable buildings include the Presbyterian Congregation of Newtown chapel (1881), the Grange Hall (1921), Tomlinson's Store (early nineteenth century), Heston Hall (c. 1830), Biles' House (1790), Biles' Corner (c. 1750), the Flowers' House and outbuildings (early to mid-nineteenth century), and the Old Shade tavern (1765, c. 1796-1799).
