= Dolington Village Historic District =

Historic district in Pennsylvania, United States

- U.S. National Register of Historic Places
- U.S. Historic district
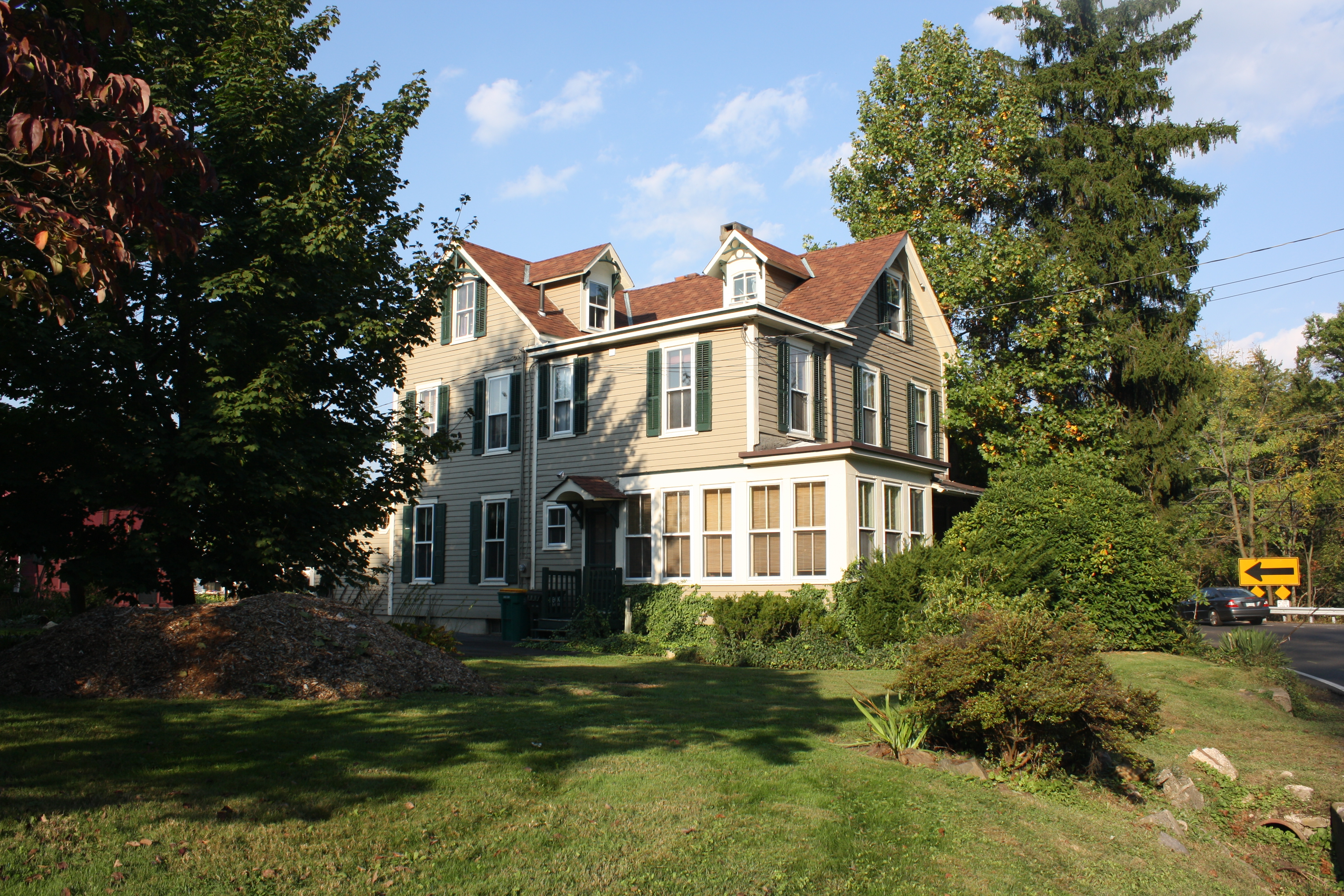
- House in the Dolington Village Historic District, October 2012

- Location within Pennsylvania Location within the United States
- Location: Jct. of Rt. 532 and Mt. Eyre Rd. (Washington Crossing Rd.), Dolington, Upper Makefield Township and Lower Makefield Township, Pennsylvania
- Coordinates: 40°15′58″N 74°53′46″W
- Area: 36 acres (15 ha)
- Architectural style: Gothic, Federal
- NRHP reference No.: 94000444
- Added to NRHP: May 26, 1994

Dolington Village Historic District is a national historic district located at Dolington, Upper Makefield Township and Lower Makefield Township, Bucks County, Pennsylvania. The district includes 64 contributing buildings, 2 contributing sites, and 4 contributing structures in the crossroads village of Dolington. The largely rural residential district includes representative buildings of the vernacular Federal and Gothic styles. The buildings were mostly built between 1800 and 1875. Notable buildings include the John L. Cox House (c. 1887), Joseph Moon House, Balderson House, John Harris House (1803), William Thornton House (c. 1803), John B. Alcutt House (c. 1845), Dolington Schoolhouse (1860), . The district also includes the ruins of the Canby / Davis Blacksmith Shop (c. 1790).

It was added to the National Register of Historic Places in 1994.

== Gallery ==
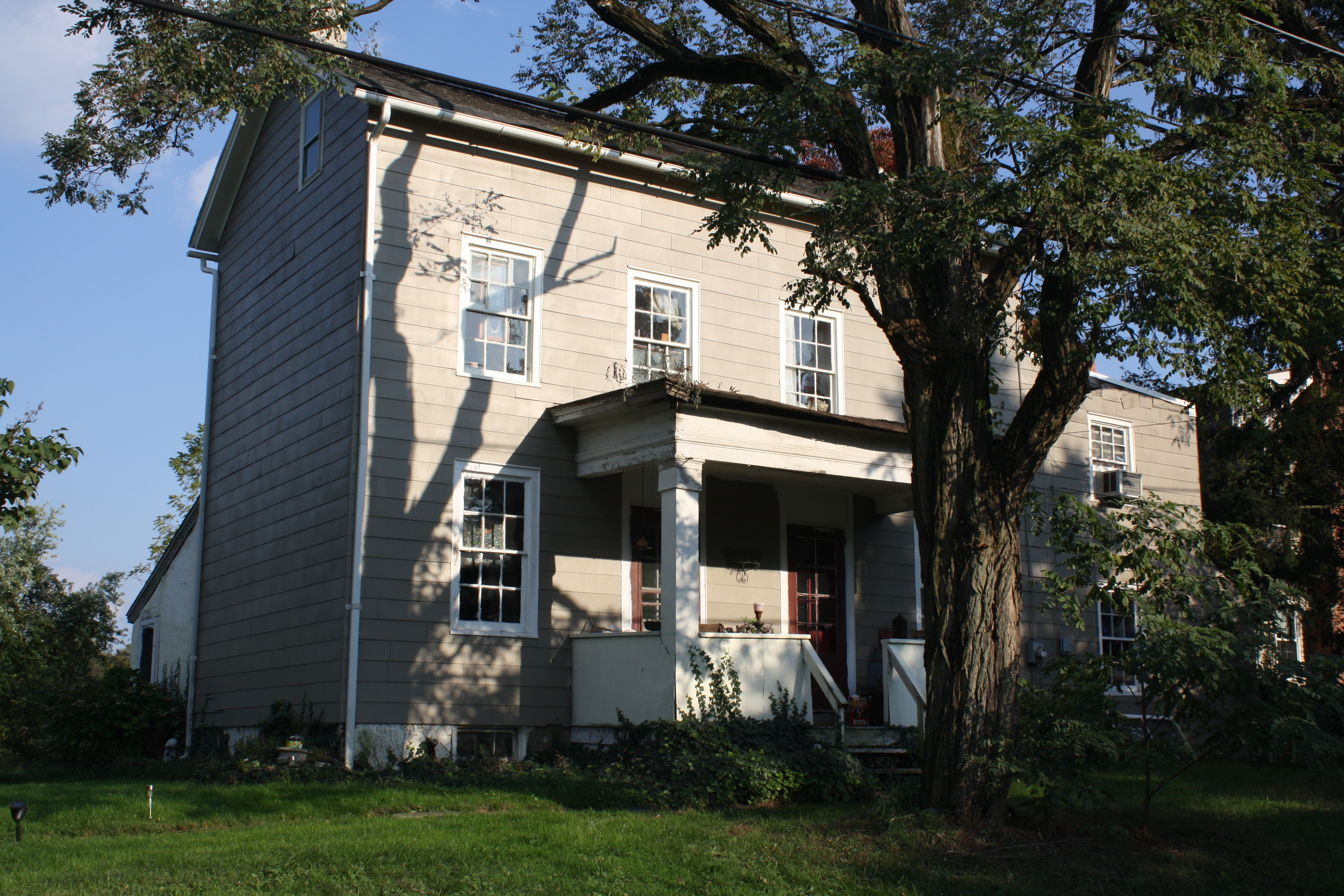

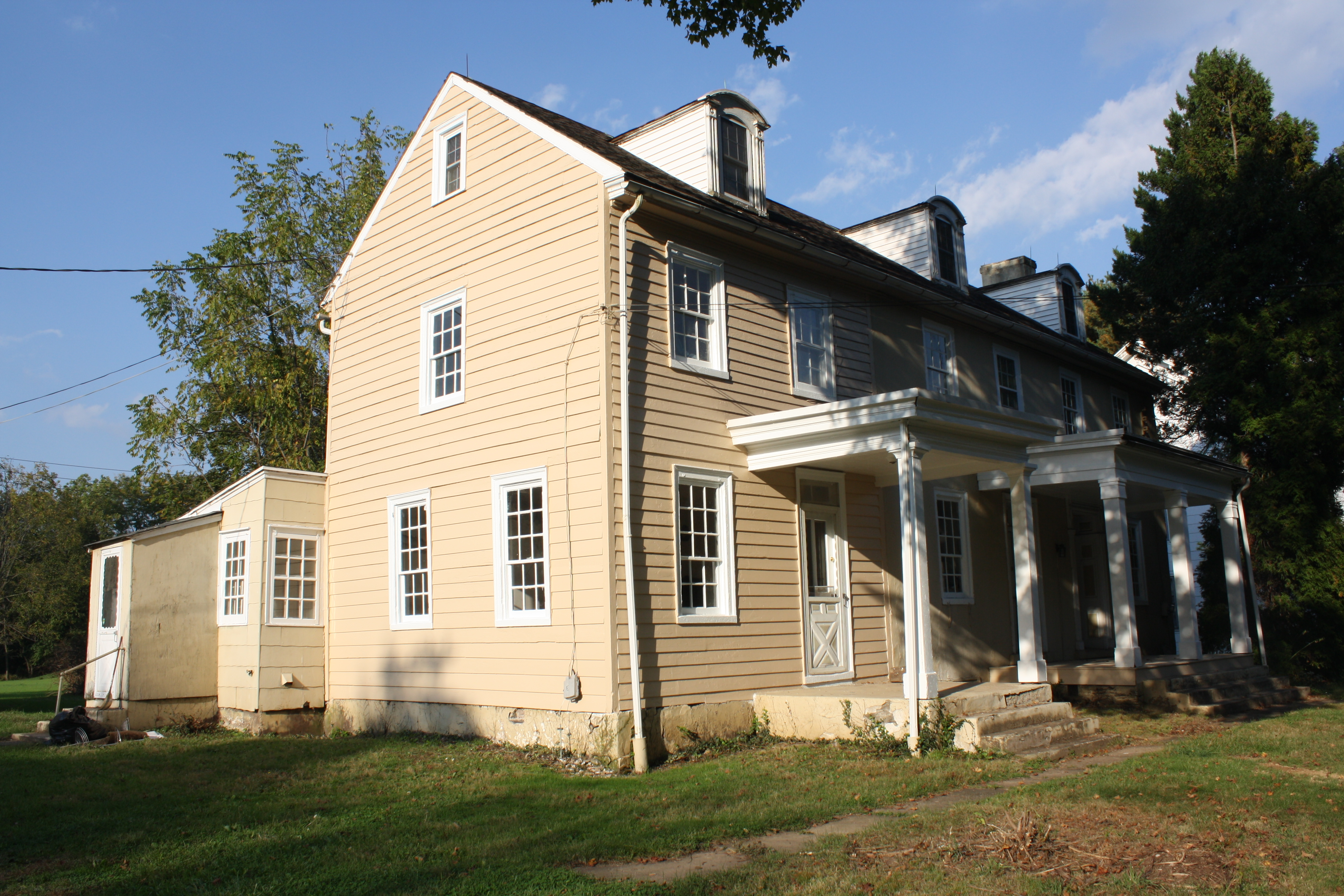

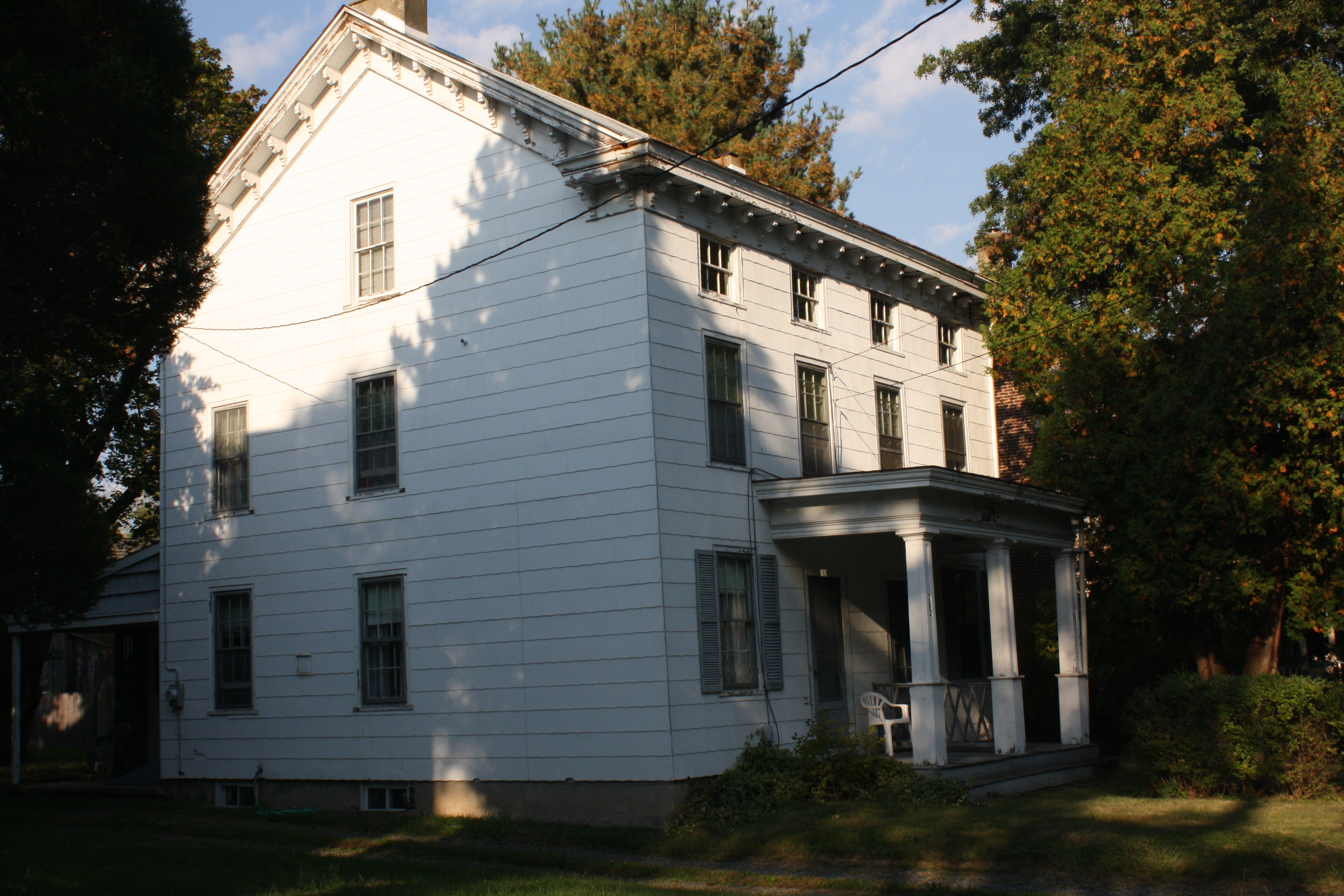

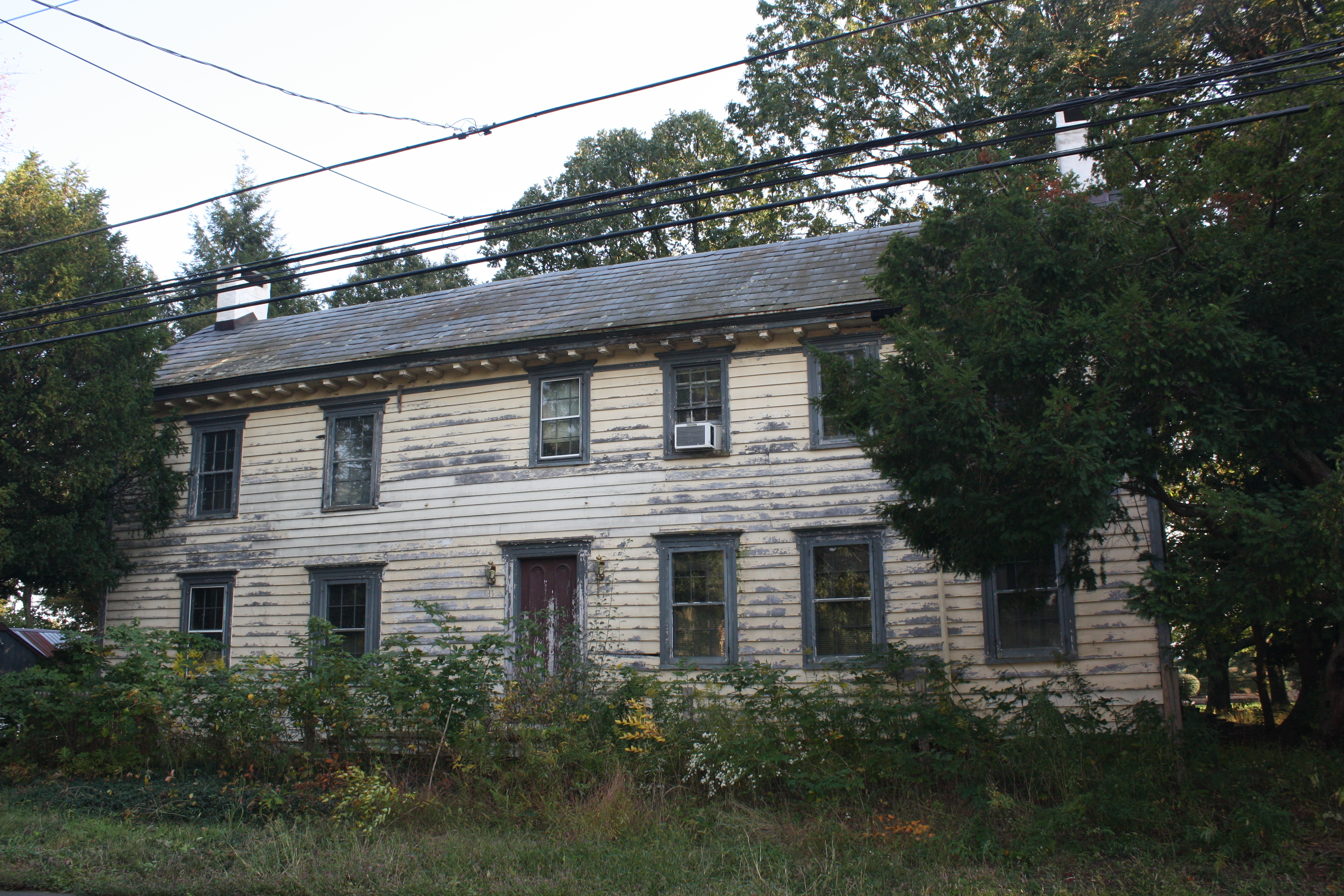

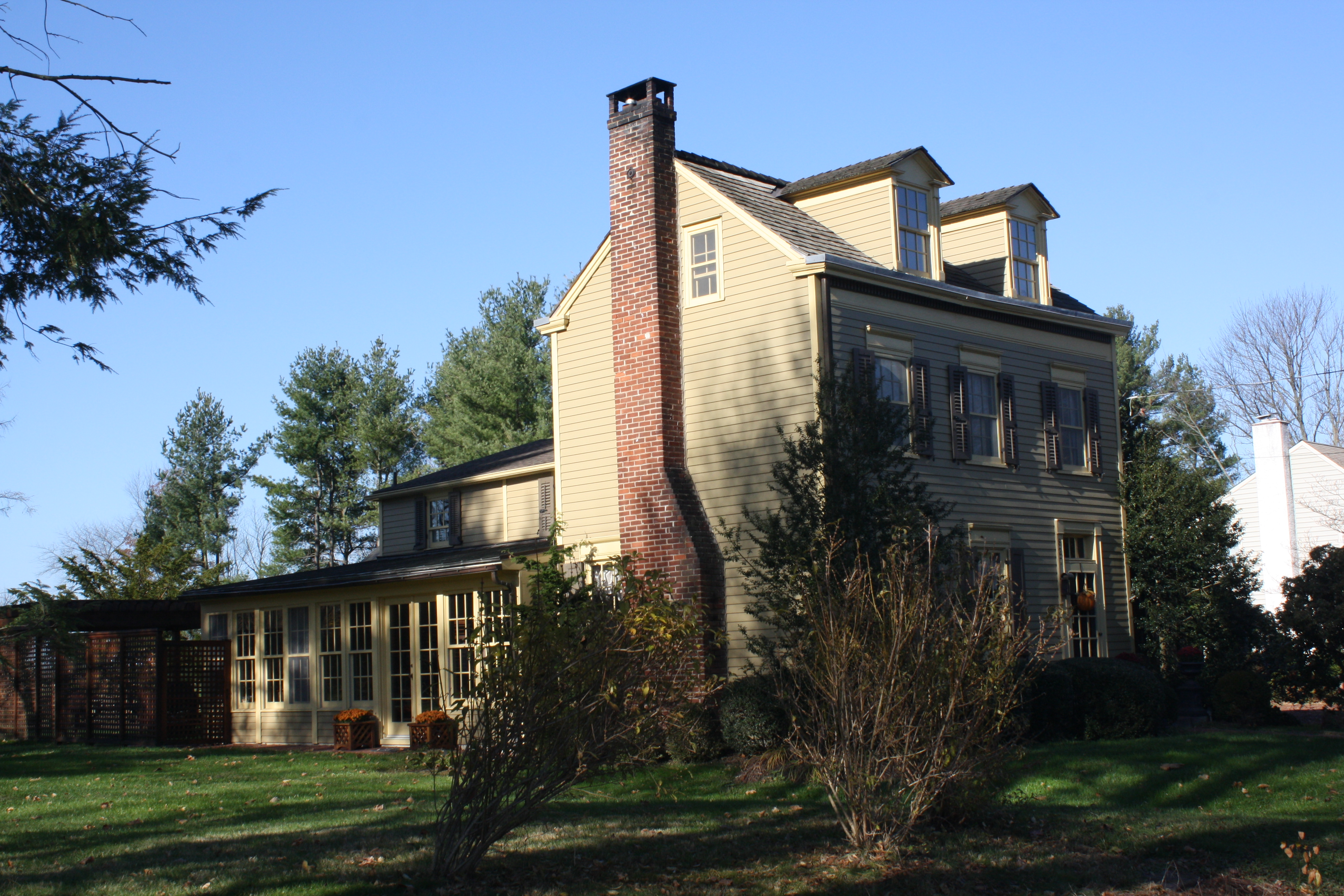
