= Macclesfield Park =

Park in Pennsylvania, US

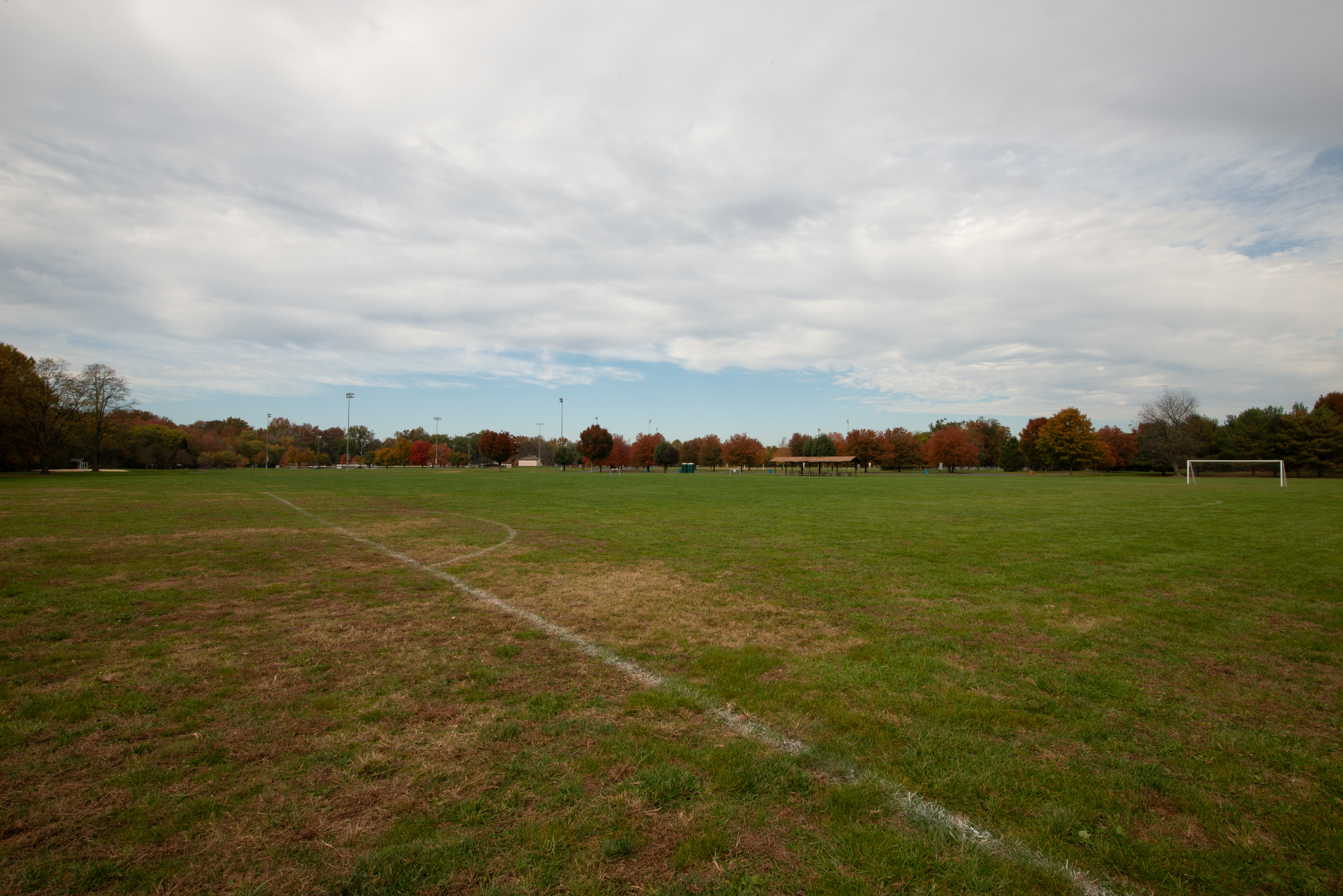
- Macclesfield Park in 2023.
- Interactive map of Macclesfield Park
- Type: Suburban Park
- Location: Lower Makefield, Bucks County, Pennsylvania
- Coordinates: 40°14′19.7″N 74°49′20.2″W
- Area: 92 acres (0.37 km^{2}; 0.144 mi^{2}).
- Created: 1989
- Owner: Lower Makefield Township

Macclesfield Park is a 92 acres (37 ha) park located in Lower Makefield Township, Pennsylvania, in the United States.

It hosts games, tournaments and practices for Pop Warner football, youth and adult soccer, baseball and softball, and teams belonging to the Pennsbury School District, primarily the soccer and Ultimate teams. Access is by permit only. The park borders the Delaware River and is accessed via River Road (Pennsylvania Route 32).

The front 60 acres of the park was dedicated in 1989. Stephen Beede, a 13-year-old township resident, won a contest to name the park after learning through research that the Makefield name likely derived from Macclesfield in England. The back 30 acres of the park was dedicated in 1997.
