= Benjamin Taylor Homestead =

Historic house in Pennsylvania, United States

- U.S. National Register of Historic Places
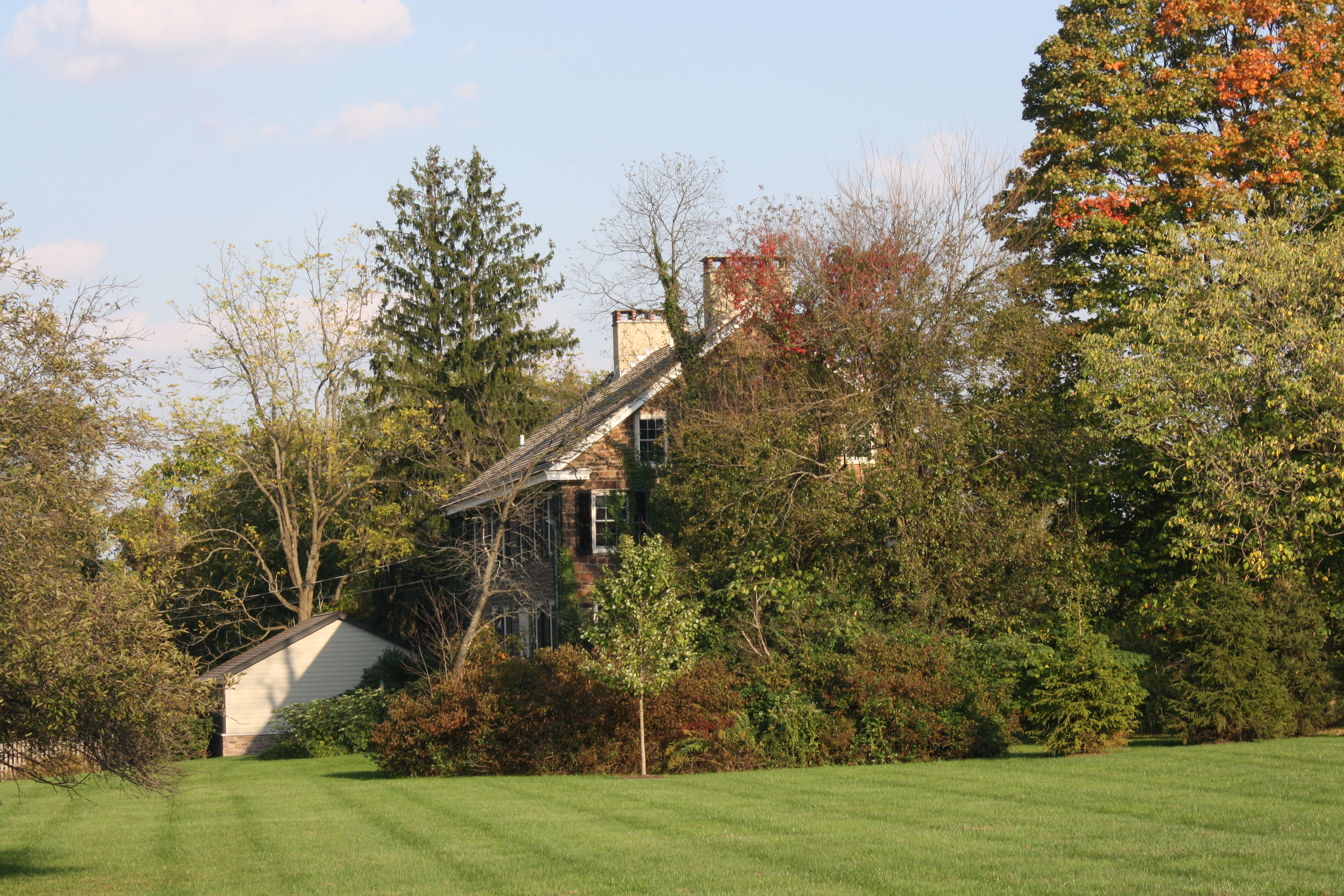
- Benjamin Taylor Homestead (Dolington Manor). October 2012.

- Location within Pennsylvania Location within the United States
- Location: Northeast of Newtown off Pennsylvania Route 532, Lower Makefield Township, Pennsylvania
- Coordinates: 40°15′26″N 74°54′43″W
- Area: 1 acre (0.40 ha)
- Built: 1738-1820
- Built by: Taylor, Benjamin
- NRHP reference No.: 75001622
- Added to NRHP: December 6, 1975

The Benjamin Taylor Homestead, also known as Dolington Manor, is an historic home that is located in Lower Makefield Township, Bucks County, Pennsylvania, United States.

It was added to the National Register of Historic Places in 1973.

== History and architectural features ==
This historic structure is a 2 1/2-story, seven-bay, stone dwelling that was built in three sections between 1738 and 1820. It has a gable roof and measures thirty feet by sixty feet. The front facade features an arcade and two entryways. The eastern and western sections were created with different exterior textures. The back of the structure has no entrances or voussoirs.
