= John and Phineas Hough House =

Historic house in Pennsylvania, United States

- U.S. National Register of Historic Places
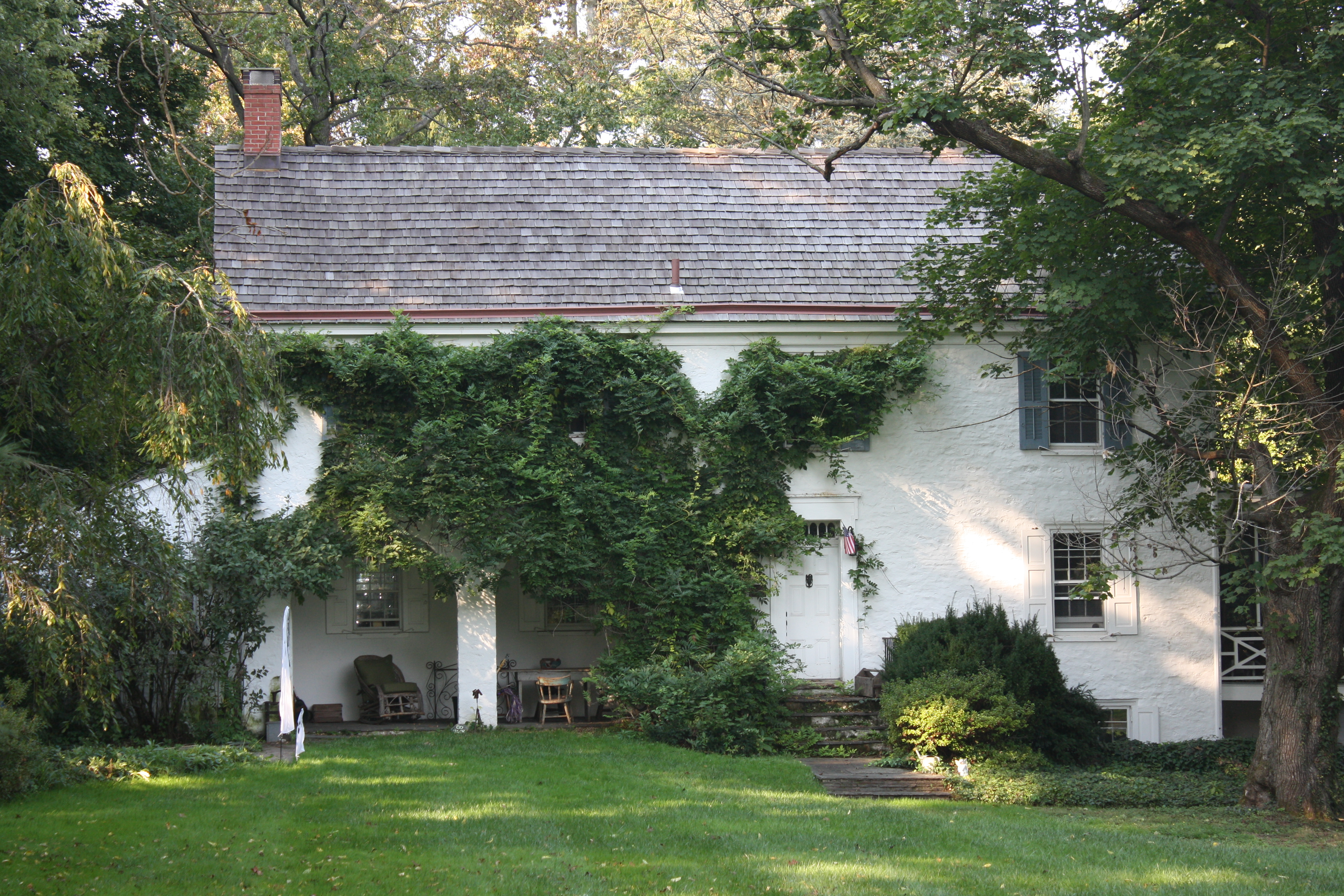
- John and Phineas Hough House. October 2012.

- Location within Pennsylvania Location within the United States
- Location: 20 Moyer Rd., Lower Makefield Township, Pennsylvania
- Coordinates: 40°13′43″N 74°50′1″W
- Area: 1.1 acres (0.45 ha)
- Built: 1801
- Architectural style: Federal, Vernacular Federal
- NRHP reference No.: 92001721
- Added to NRHP: December 24, 1992

The John and Phineas Hough House, also known as "Twin Arches," is an historic home that is located in Lower Makefield Township, Bucks County, Pennsylvania, United States.

It was added to the National Register of Historic Places in 1992.

== History and architectural features ==
The original two-bay stone house was expanded to its present form circa 1840 with the addition of a two-bay section. It is a 2 1/2-story, four-bay dwelling that was designed in the Federal style. The front facade features an arcade of two Roman arches added about 1801 to the original dwelling. Also located on the property is a contributing stone spring house. The original section of the house is believed to date as early as 1700, and considered the oldest documented stone house in Bucks County.
