= Slate Hill Cemetery =

Historic cemetery in Bucks County, Pennsylvania, US

- Slate Hill Burying Ground
- U.S. National Register of Historic Places
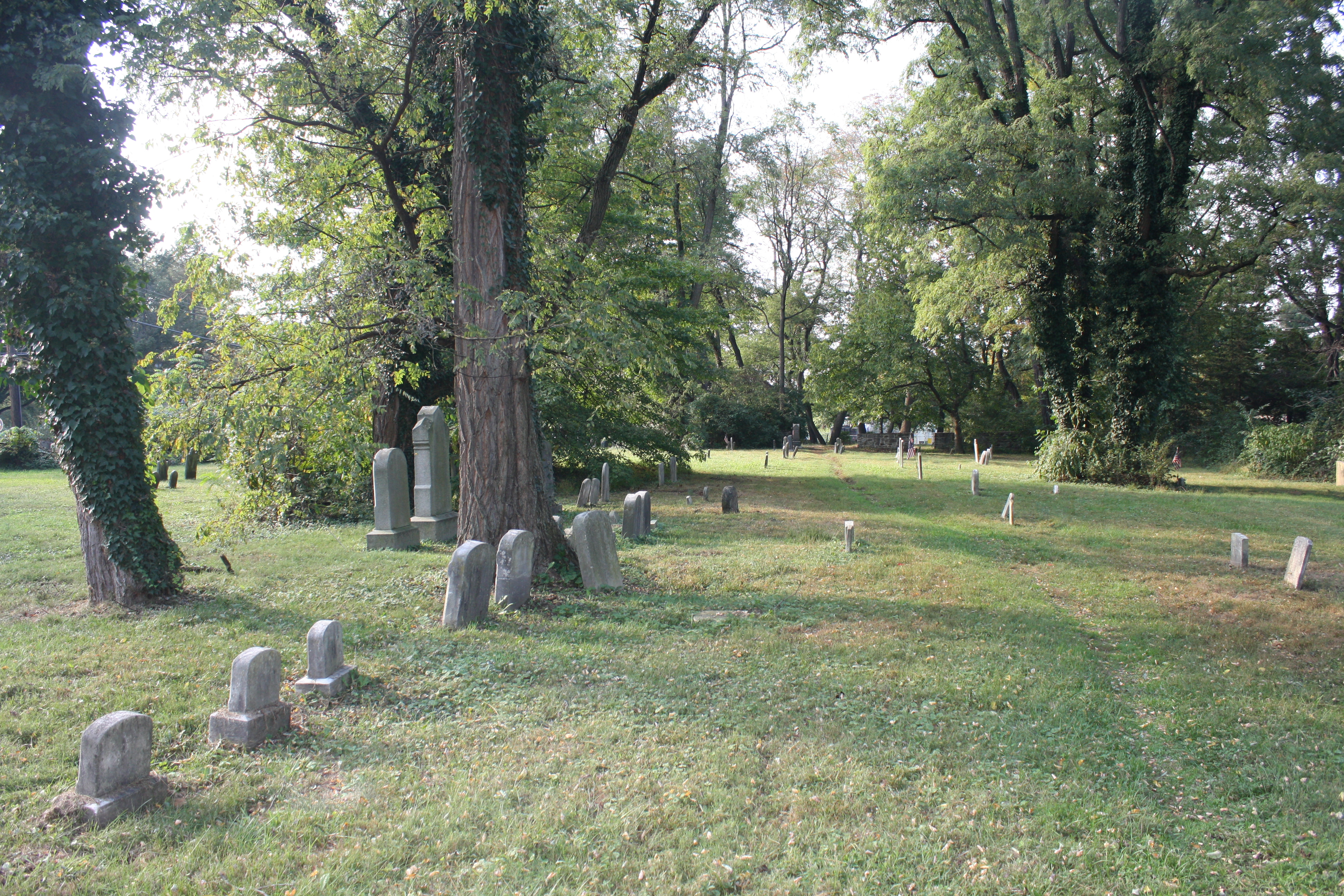
- Slate Hill Burying Ground (Cemetery). October 2012.

- Location within Pennsylvania Location within the United States
- Location: Junction of Yardley–Morrisville Road and Mahlon Drive, Lower Makefield Township, Pennsylvania
- Coordinates: 40°13′59″N 74°49′37″W
- Area: 1.3 acres (0.53 ha)
- Built: 1698
- NRHP reference No.: 92000397
- Added to NRHP: April 28, 1992

Slate Hill Burying Ground (also known as Old Slate Hill Burying Ground and Yardley Cemetery) is a historic cemetery in Lower Makefield Township, Pennsylvania, with most of its graves dating to 18th century Quaker settlers. It is located at Yardley-Morrisville Road and Mahlon Drive.

Established in 1690, it is probably the oldest burial ground in Bucks County. The earliest gravestone is dated 1698, but unmarked graves may be even earlier. The cemetery consists of three sections: the first was given in 1690 by Thomas Janney; the second given in 1721 by Abel Janney; and the last given in 1788 by Joshua Anderson. The Anderson grant created the first public cemetery in Lower Makefield Township. The two earlier sections are known as the Quaker section.

The Quaker section has 185 marked graves out of a total of 487, most pre-dating 1800. The public section has 96 marked graves including those of six free African Americans who served in the Union Army during the American Civil War.

The cemetery was added to the National Register of Historic Places in 1982.
