= Ivyland Historic District =

Historic district in Pennsylvania, United States

- U.S. National Register of Historic Places
- U.S. Historic district
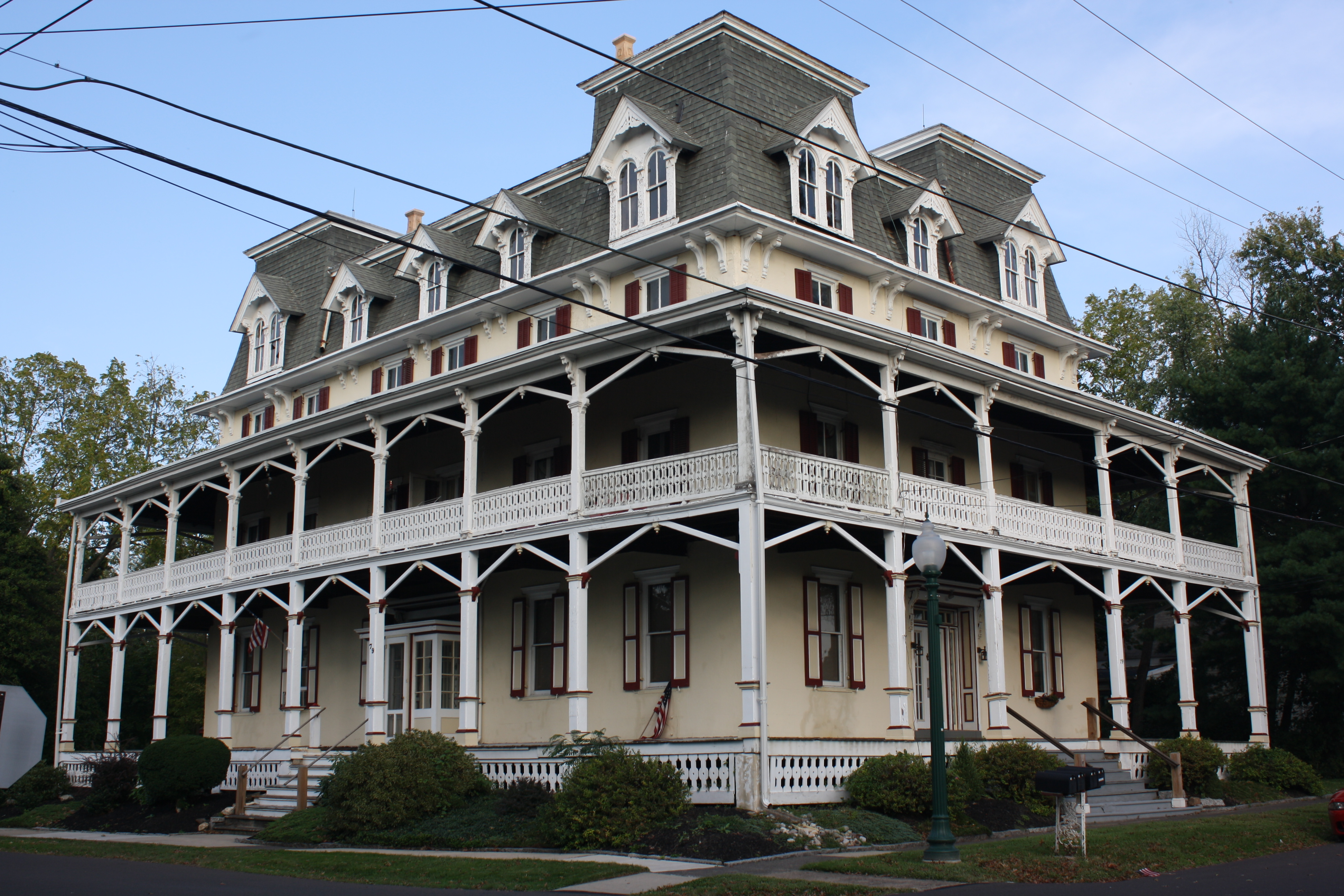
- "The Temperance House" hotel, Ivyland Historic District, September 2012

- Location within Pennsylvania Location within the United States
- Location: Bounded by Jacksonbille Rd., Wilson, Greeley, and Chase Aves., Ivyland, Pennsylvania
- Coordinates: 40°12′31″N 75°04′25″W
- Area: 42 acres (17 ha)
- Built by: Carrell, Joseph A.
- Architectural style: Late Victorian, Late 19th And 20th Century Revivals
- NRHP reference No.: 02000225
- Added to NRHP: March 21, 2002

The Ivyland Historic District is a national historic district which is located in Ivyland, Bucks County, Pennsylvania.

It was added to the National Register of Historic Places in 2002.

== History and architectural features ==
The district includes one hundred and thirty-three contributing buildings which are located in the borough of Ivyland. It is primarily a residential district, with a number of buildings representative of Late Victorian styles which date between 1873 and 1931 and reflect Ivyland's development as a planned railroad suburb. The majority of the residential buildings are two-and-one-half-story, frame structures with gable roofs, front porches, and irregular plans. One notable non-residential building is "The Temperance House" hotel (c. 1875).
