= Pennsylvania Route 332 =

State highway in Pennsylvania, US

Pennsylvania Route 332

Route information
- Maintained by PennDOT
- Length: 17.522 mi (28.199 km)
- Existed: 1928–present

Major junctions
- West end: PA 263 in Hatboro
- PA 132 in Warminster; PA 232 in Richboro; PA 413 / PA 532 in Newtown; I-295 in Lower Makefield Township
- East end: PA 32 in Yardley

Location
- Country: United States
- State: Pennsylvania
- Counties: Montgomery, Bucks

Highway system
- Pennsylvania State Route System; Interstate; US; State; Scenic; Legislative
← PA 331	→ PA 333

Pennsylvania Route 332 (PA 332) is a state highway in the U.S. state of Pennsylvania. The route runs 17.5 miles (28.2 km) from PA 263 in Hatboro, Montgomery County, east to PA 32 in Yardley, Bucks County. PA 332 runs through suburban areas to the north of Philadelphia, serving Warminster, Ivyland, Richboro, and Newtown. The route is two lanes wide most of its length, with the bypass around Newtown a four-lane divided highway. PA 332 intersects PA 132 in Warminster, PA 232 in Richboro, PA 413 and PA 532 in Newtown (all three run concurrently on the Newtown Bypass), and Interstate 295 (I-295) in Lower Makefield Township.

What would become PA 332 between Newtown and Yardley was designated part of Legislative Route 252 in 1911. PA 332 was created in 1928 to run from PA 263 in Hatboro east to Ivyland with the road between Newtown and Yardley designated as part of PA 532. In 1937, PA 332 was extended to PA 113 in Newtown. The route was extended to Yardley in 1946, replacing PA 532. PA 332 was rerouted to bypass Newtown in 1991 when the eastern portion of the Newtown Bypass was completed.

== Route description ==
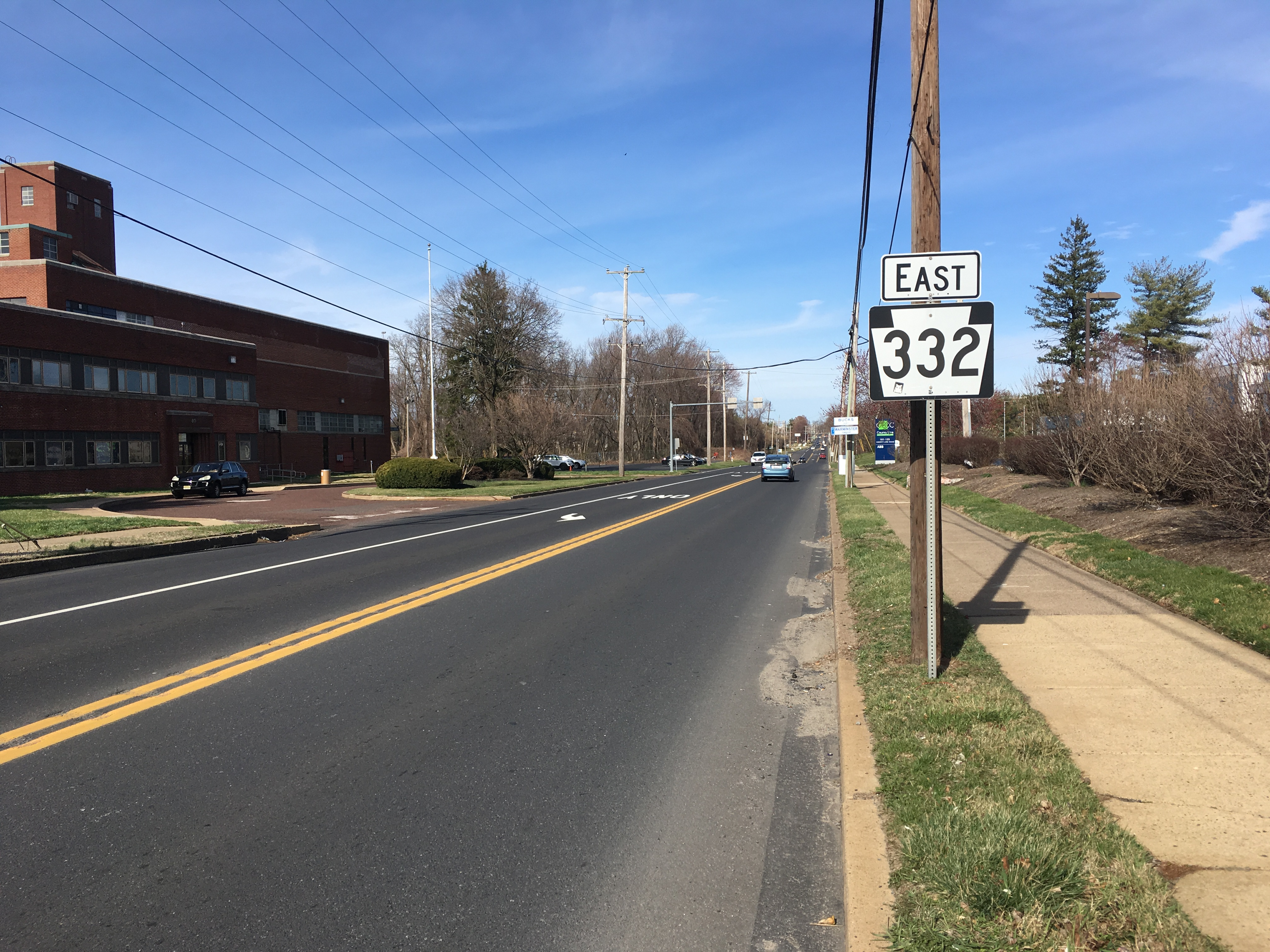
PA 332 eastbound past East County Line Road in Warminster Township

PA 332 begins at an intersection with PA 263 (North York Road) in the borough of Hatboro in Montgomery County, heading east on East Montgomery Avenue, a two-lane undivided roadway. The road passes through residential areas, crossing SEPTA's Warminster Line at-grade. Immediately after crossing the railroad tracks, the route turns northeast onto Jacksonville Road and runs through industrial areas with some homes and businesses.

PA 332 intersects East County Line Road and it enters Warminster Township in Bucks County, gaining a center left-turn lane. The road passes between the Warminster station that serves as the terminus of SEPTA's Warminster Line to the west and the neighborhood of Warminster Heights to the east. The route loses the center turn lane before it widens to four lanes and crosses PA 132 near businesses as it continues near industrial parks. The road narrows back to two lanes past the Johnsville Boulevard intersection and enters the borough of Ivyland, heading past homes. The route becomes the border between Ivyland to the northwest and Warminster Township to the southeast prior to crossing Bristol Road into Northampton Township. PA 332 continues between industrial areas to the northwest and residential areas to the southeast, reaching an intersection with Almshouse Road in the community of Jacksonville.

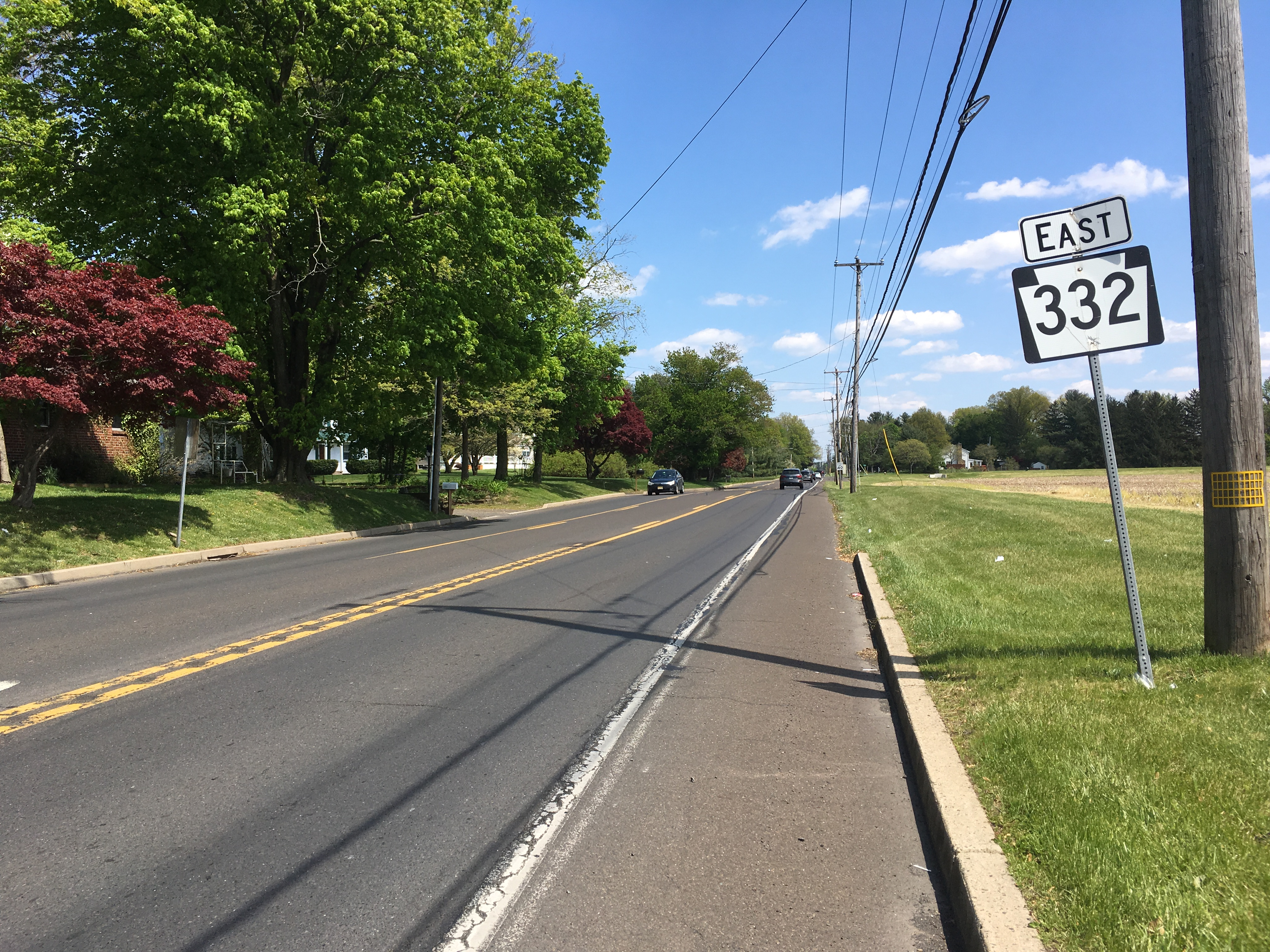
PA 332 eastbound past Hatboro Road in Northampton Township

PA 332 turns southeast onto Almshouse Road and runs through a mix of farm fields and residences. Past the Hatboro Road intersection, the road curves to the east and gains a center left-turn lane, heading into the community of Richboro. In Richboro, the route passes through business areas and intersects PA 232. Upon crossing PA 232, PA 332 changes its name to Newtown Richboro Road and continues past more homes as a two-lane road. The road forms the southern boundary of Tyler State Park, running between areas of fields and woods in the park to the north and residential subdivisions to the south and intersecting Holland Road. The route curves northeast and then east before crossing the Neshaminy Creek into Newtown Township, where the name changes to Richboro Road. In this area, the road briefly widens into a divided highway before it comes to an intersection with PA 413/PA 532 at the Newtown Bypass, a road that provides a bypass of the borough of Newtown.

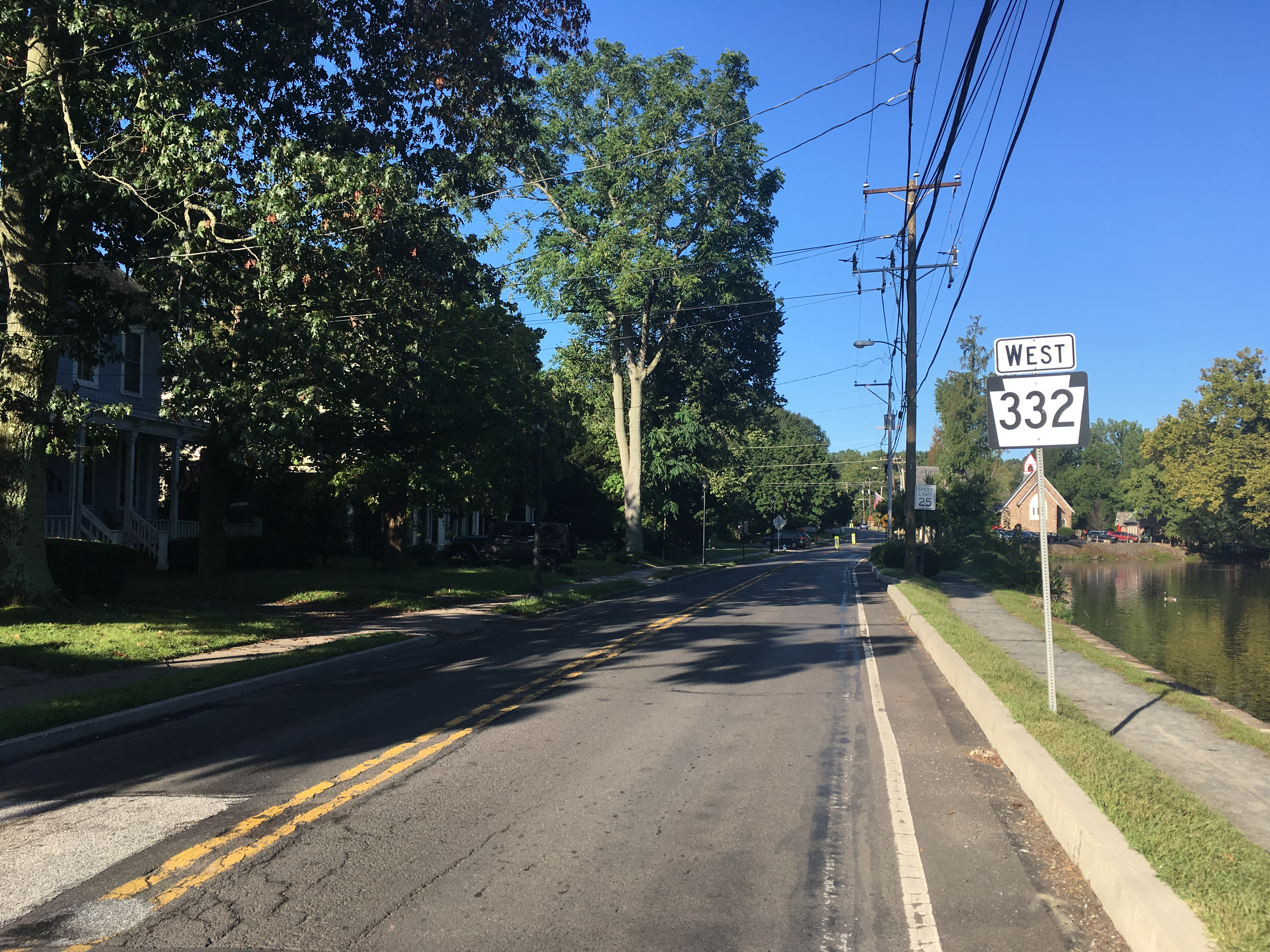
PA 332 westbound past Main Street in Yardley

At this point, PA 332 turns south onto the four-lane divided Newtown Bypass, forming a concurrency with PA 413/PA 532. The road heads through wooded areas with nearby residential development, with PA 532 splitting southwest onto Buck Road toward Holland. PA 332/PA 413 curve east, passing over Newtown Creek and coming to a bridge over Freedom Drive and the abandoned Fox Chase/Newtown railroad line. The road enters Middletown Township before PA 413 splits from the bypass by turning south onto Newtown Langhorne Road toward the borough of Langhorne. PA 332 continues east near residential and commercial development as it crosses back into Newtown Township and runs a short distance to the north of the border between Newtown Township and Middletown Township, passing north of a shopping center that is served by an eastbound ramp. The road curves to the northeast at the Penns Trail/Woodbourne Road junction before turning east past the intersection with Newtown Yardley Road.

Upon intersecting Lindenhurst Road/Campus Drive north of the Newtown Campus of Holy Family University, the route enters Lower Makefield Township and becomes Newtown Yardley Road. The road passes through farmland, coming to a junction with Stony Hill Road, before heading north of an office park and reaching a partial cloverleaf interchange with I-295. Following this interchange, PA 332 becomes a two-lane undivided road and intersects Mirror Lake Road before it enters residential areas and crosses Buck Creek. The route reaches a junction with Yardley Langhorne Road and turns northeast onto Afton Avenue. PA 332 enters the borough of Yardley, where it is known as West Afton Avenue. The road heads into the downtown area and crosses Main Street, where the road name changes to East Afton Avenue, and the Delaware Canal. PA 332 comes to its eastern terminus at an intersection with PA 32, which runs along the west bank of the Delaware River.

== History ==
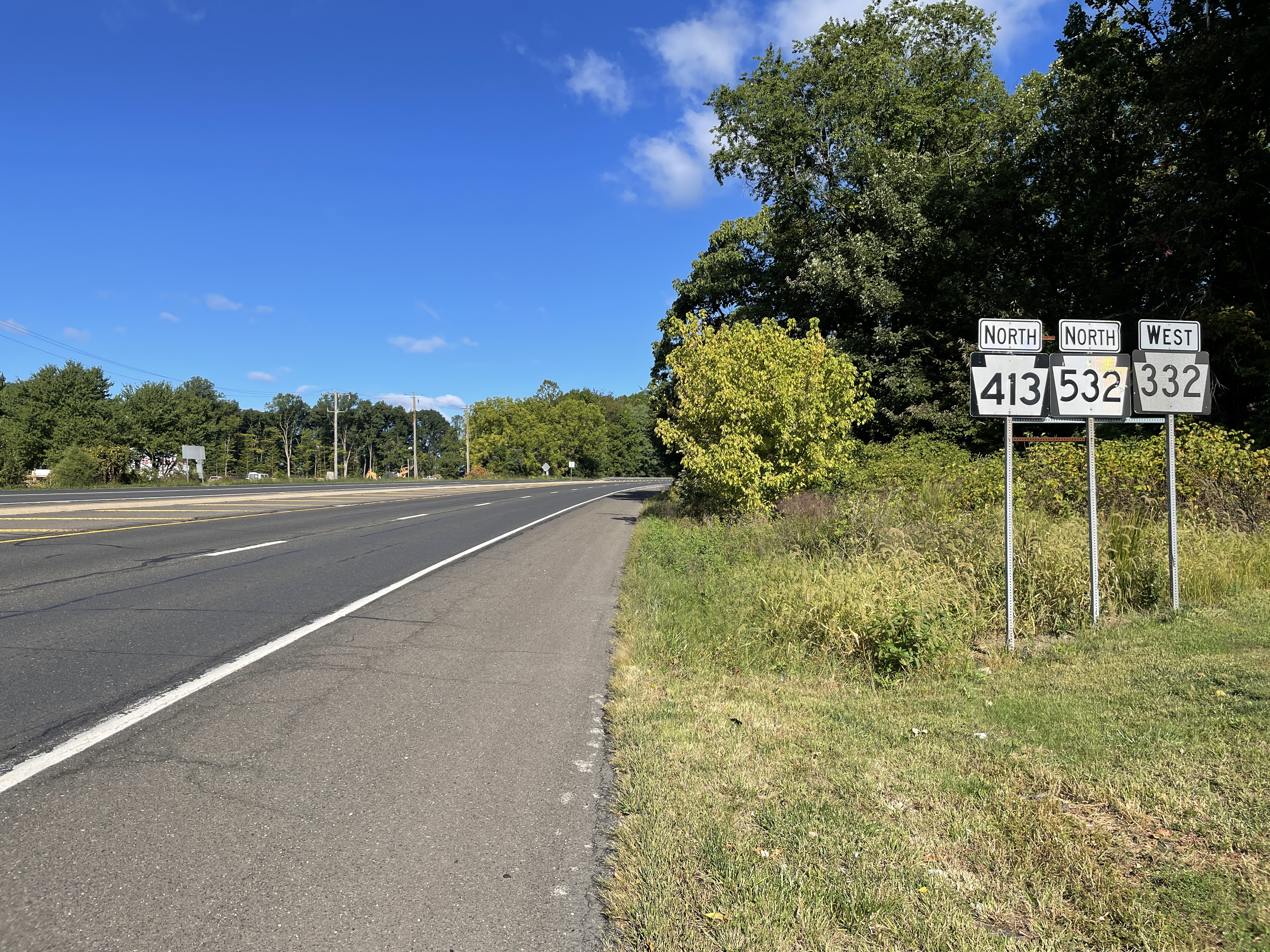
PA 332 westbound along with PA 413 northbound and PA 532 northbound on the Newtown Bypass

What would become PA 332 between Newtown and Yardley was designated as part of Legislative Route 252 in 1911, which continued southeast from Yardley to Morrisville. In 1928, PA 332 was designated to run from PA 263 in Hatboro east to Ivyland, with the portion of road between Newtown and Yardley designated as part of PA 532. Between Ivyland and Newtown, the road remained an unnumbered road that was paved with the exception of a portion west of Newtown. PA 332 was extended from Ivyland east to end at PA 113 (State Street) in Newtown in 1937, with the entire route paved by 1940. PA 332 entered Newtown from the west on Richboro Road. In 1943, PA 332 within Warminster Township was widened as part of a military access road to Naval Air Development Center, Johnsville, costing $93,789.

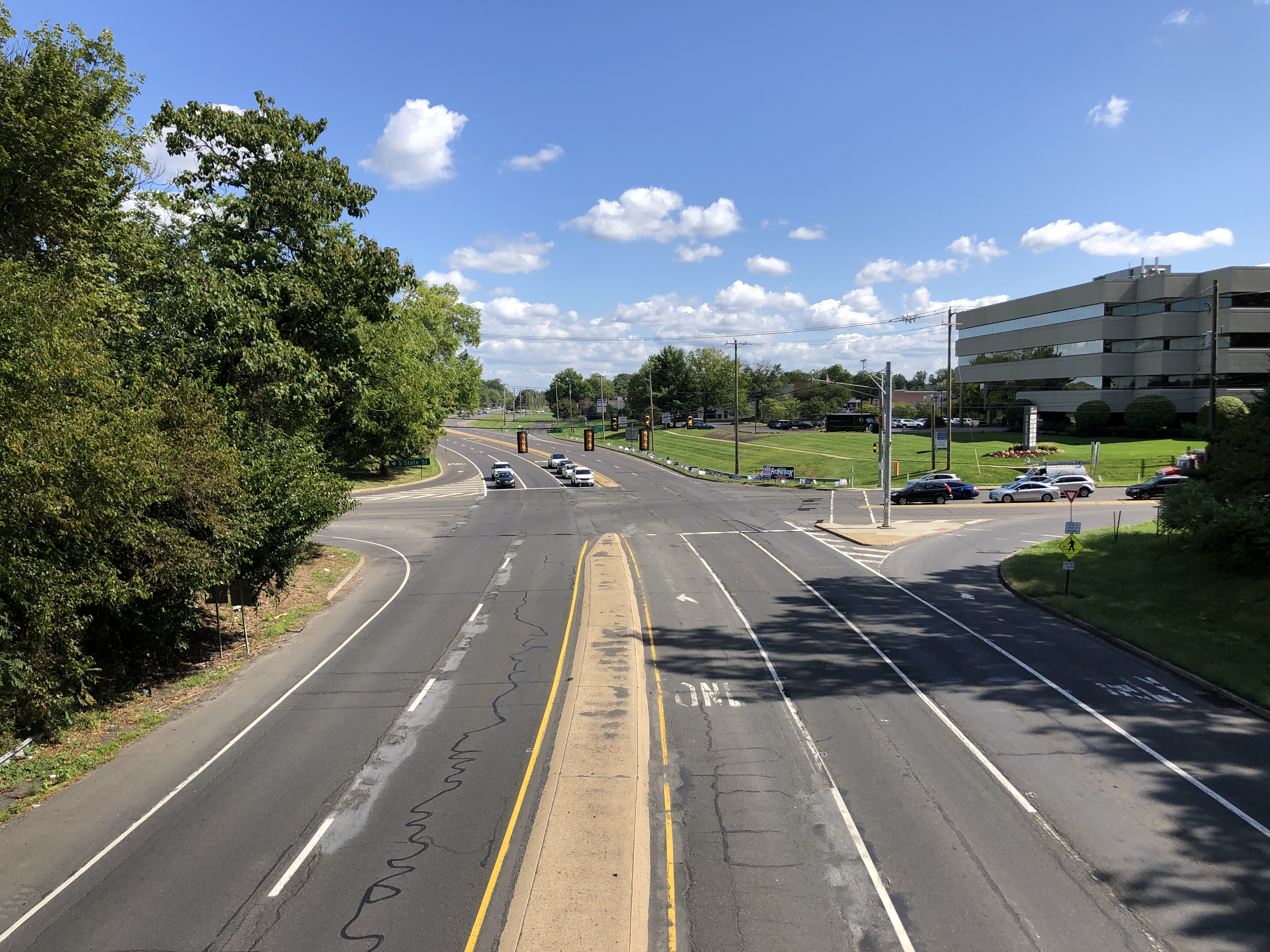
PA 332 eastbound/PA 413 southbound along the Newtown Bypass in Middletown Township

In 1946, PA 332 was extended east to Yardley, replacing that portion of PA 532. The route continued north from its previous eastern terminus on PA 413 (former PA 113, State Street) before turning east on Washington Street and leaving Newtown on Newtown Yardley Road. The portion of the Newtown Bypass carrying PA 332 west of PA 413 (Newtown Langhorne Road) was completed as part of a western bypass of Newtown for PA 413 in 1977. In September 1989, construction began to extend the Newtown Bypass east to the interchange between PA 332 and I-95 (now I-295). Construction on this bypass was completed in November 1991 at a cost of $16.6 million. With the completion of this bypass, PA 332 was rerouted to bypass Newtown. On April 22, 2014, the portion of PA 332 along the Newtown Bypass west of the PA 413 split at Newtown Langhorne Road was renamed the Officer Gregg Memorial Bypass in honor of Brian S. Gregg, a borough of Newtown police officer who was killed in the line of duty on September 29, 2005.

== Major intersections ==
County	Location	mi	km	Destinations	Notes
Montgomery	Hatboro	0.000	0.000	PA 263 (North York Road)	Western terminus
Bucks	Warminster Township	1.879	3.024	PA 132 (Street Road) – Warminster, Southampton	
Bucks	Northampton Township	7.036	11.323	PA 232 (Second Street Pike) – New Hope, Bryn Athyn	
Bucks	Newtown Township	10.572	17.014	PA 413 north / PA 532 north (Newtown Bypass) – Buckingham, Washington Crossing	West end of PA 413/PA 532 overlap
Bucks	Newtown Township	11.154	17.951	PA 532 south (Buck Road) – Feasterville	East end of PA 532 overlap
Bucks	Middletown Township	11.820	19.022	PA 413 south (Newtown Langhorne Road) – Langhorne	East end of PA 413 overlap
Bucks	Lower Makefield Township	14.849	23.897	I-295 to I-95 south – Philadelphia, Princeton	Exit 8 on I-295; former I-95
Bucks	Yardley	17.522	28.199	PA 32 (Delaware Avenue)	Eastern terminus
1.000 mi = 1.609 km; 1.000 km = 0.621 mi: Concurrency terminus
