= Wycombe Village Historic District =

Historic district in Pennsylvania, United States

- U.S. National Register of Historic Places
- U.S. Historic district
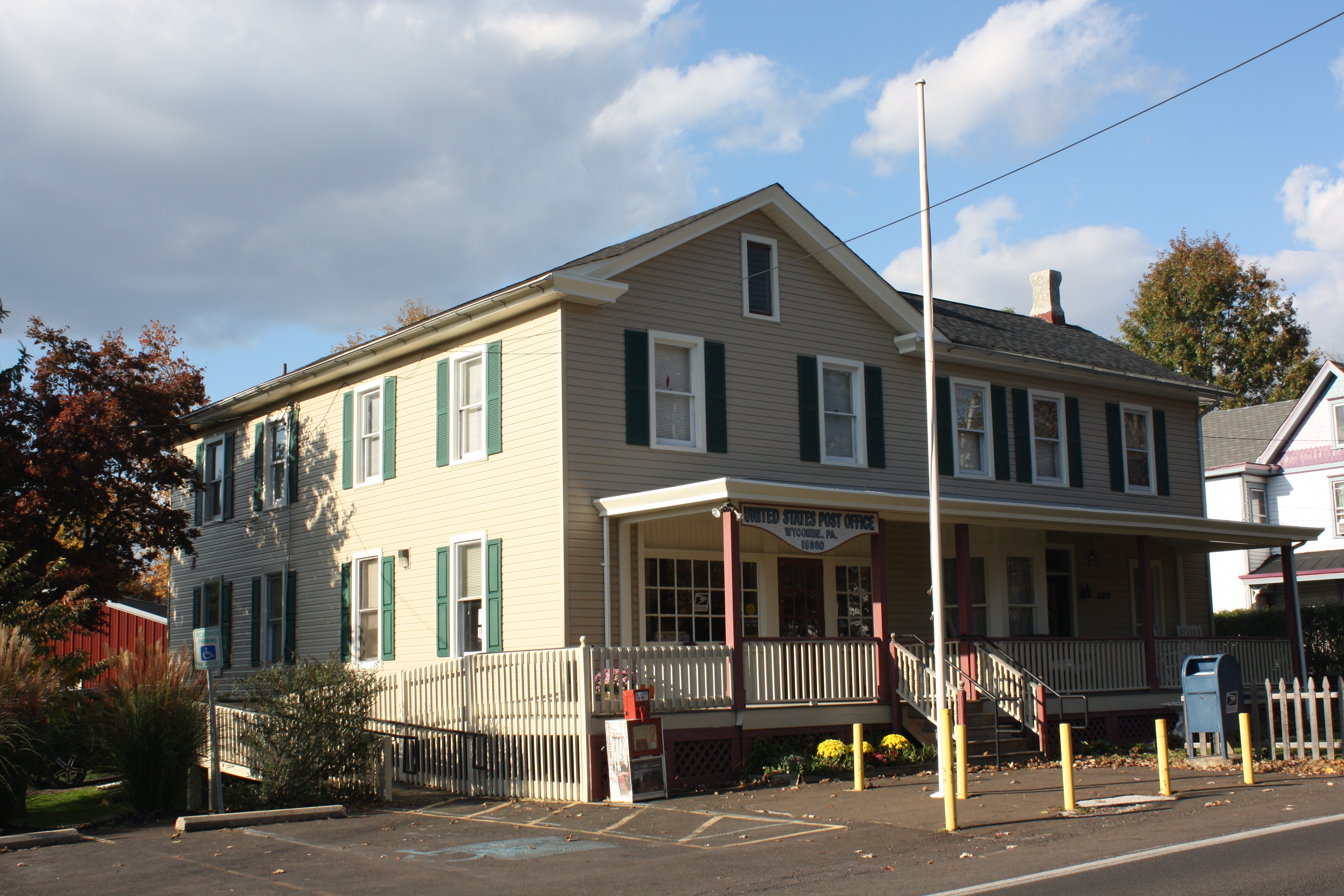
- Wycombe Post Office. October 2012.

- Location within Pennsylvania Location within the United States
- Location: Roughly bounded by Township Line, Mill Creek and Forest Grove Rds., Cherry Lane, Washington and Park Aves., Wycombe, Buckingham Township and Wrightstown Township, Pennsylvania
- Coordinates: 40°16′57″N 75°01′07″W
- Area: 63 acres (25 ha)
- Built: 1891–1915
- Architectural style: Bungalow/craftsman, Vernacular Queen Anne
- NRHP reference No.: 85000177
- Added to NRHP: January 31, 1985

The Wycombe Village Historic District is a national historic district that is located in Wycombe, Buckingham Township and Wrightstown Township, Bucks County, Pennsylvania.

It was added to the National Register of Historic Places in 1985.

== History and architectural features ==
This district includes fifty-six contributing buildings and three contributing structures, including a variety of residential, commercial and institutional buildings that are notable examples of Queen Anne and Bungalow/craftsman architecture. Most were built between 1891 and 1915. Notable buildings include the Carver-Slack Farmstead (c. 1790-1820), the Coal and Lumber Yard/Feed Mill (1892-1927), the Wycombe Station (1891-1892), the Edward Kirk House (1911), the Albert S. Worthington House (1908), Cope Mansion (1899), Wycombe Hall/Cope Hall (1909), the Warner S. Thompson Mansion (1901), the Albert J. Thompson Mansion (1899, 1909) and the Wycombe Independent Schoolhouse (1913). Also located in the district but listed separately with the National Register of Historic Places is the Gen. John Lacey Homestead.

== Gallery ==
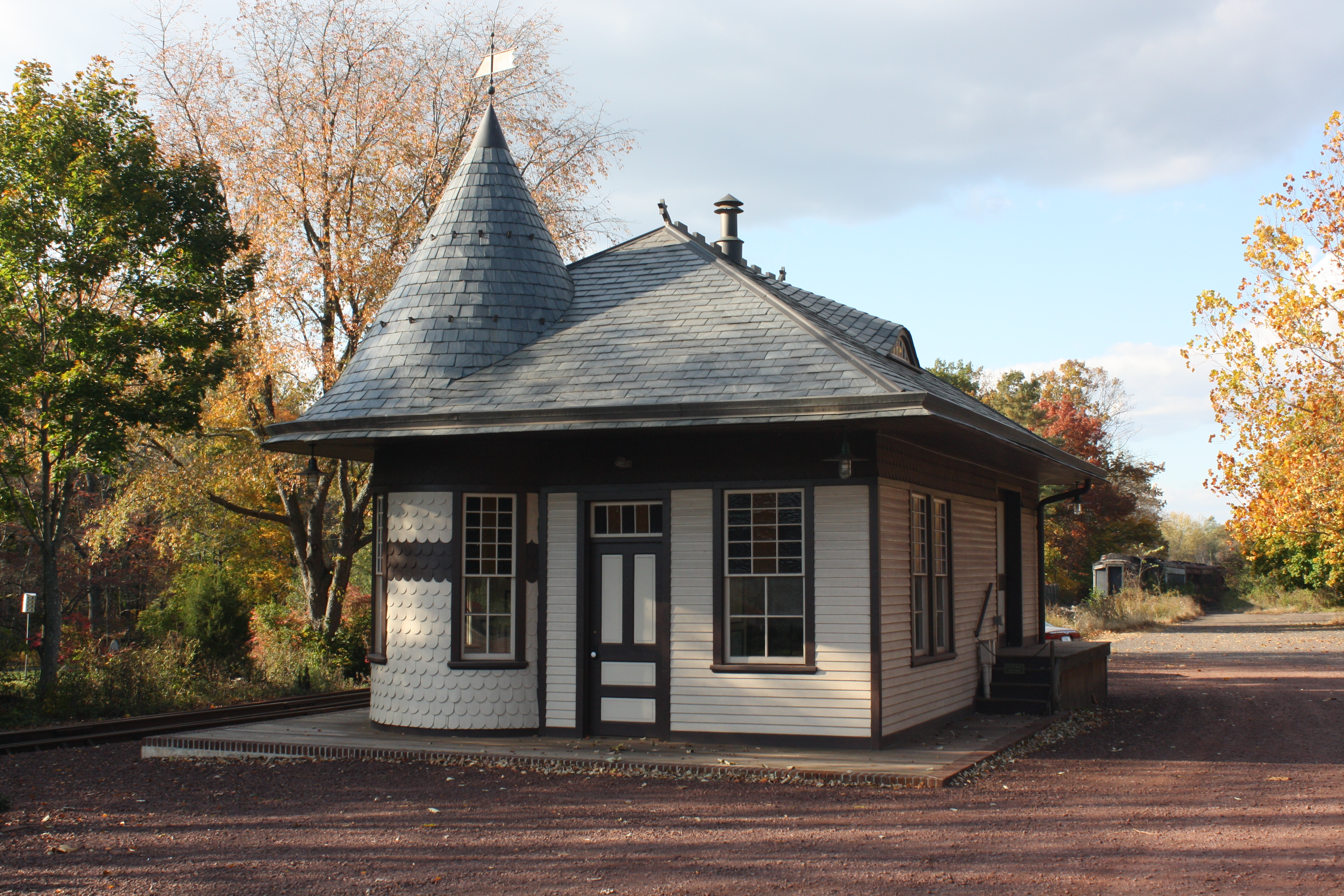
Wycombe Station

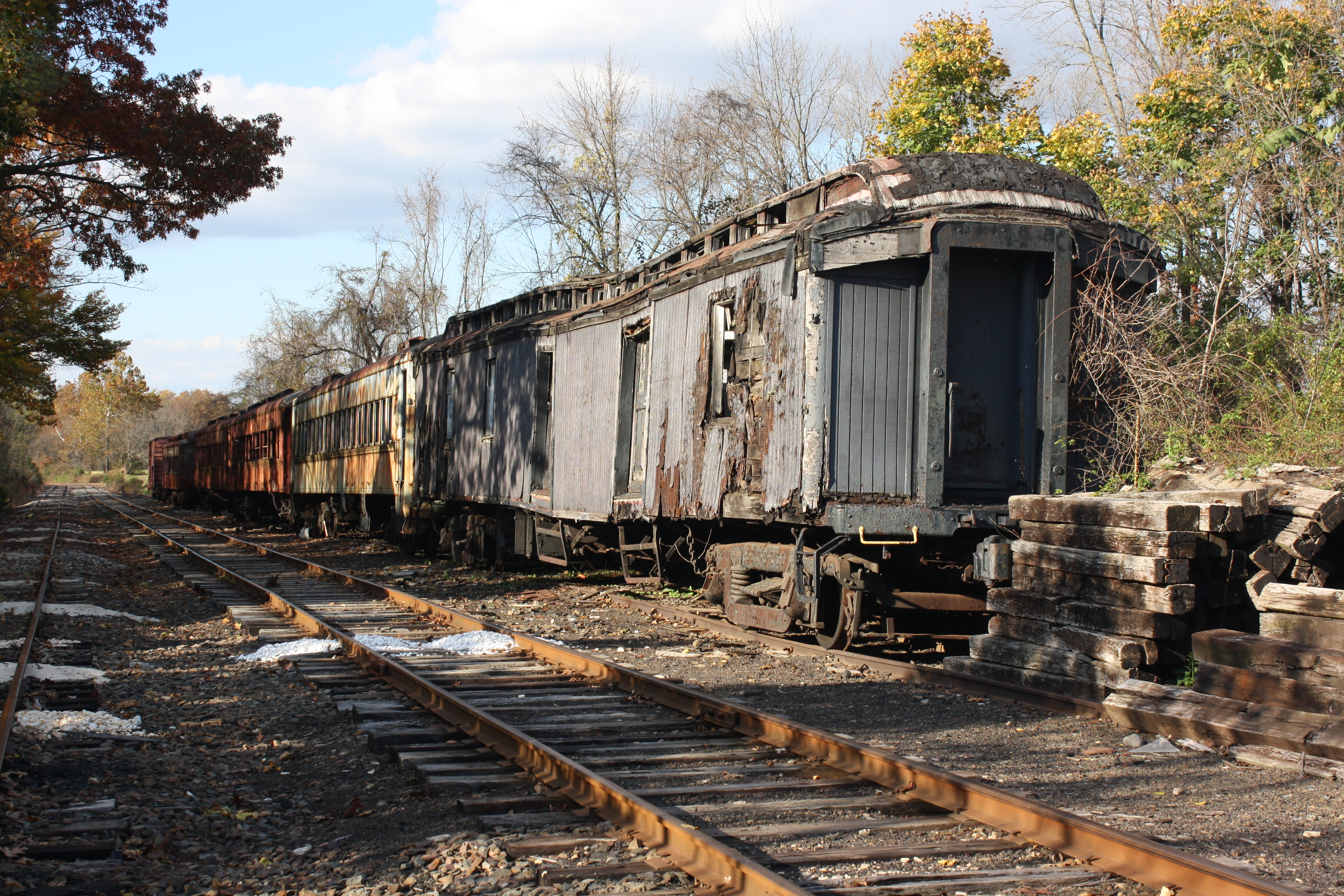
Wycombe Station

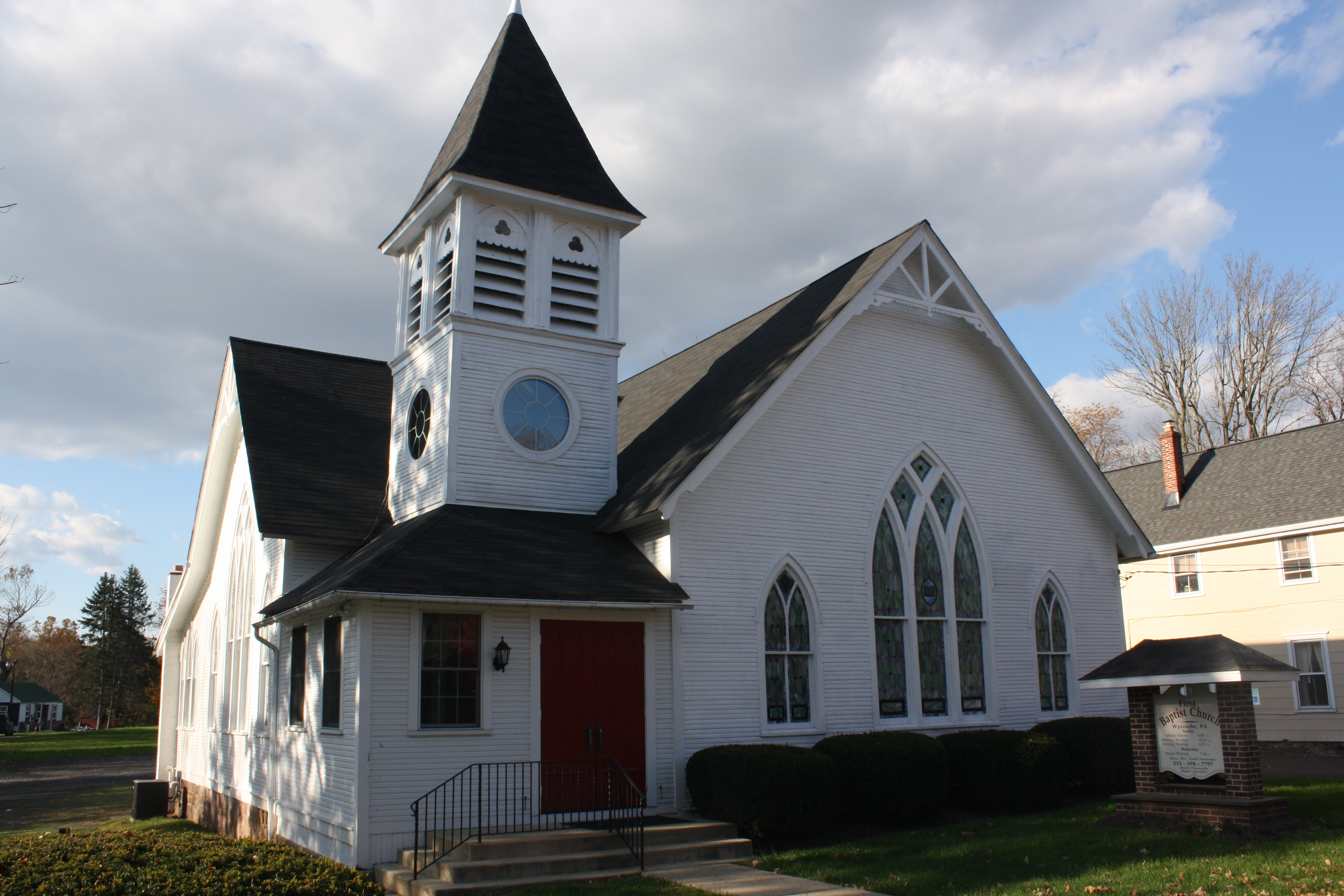
Wycombe Baptist Church

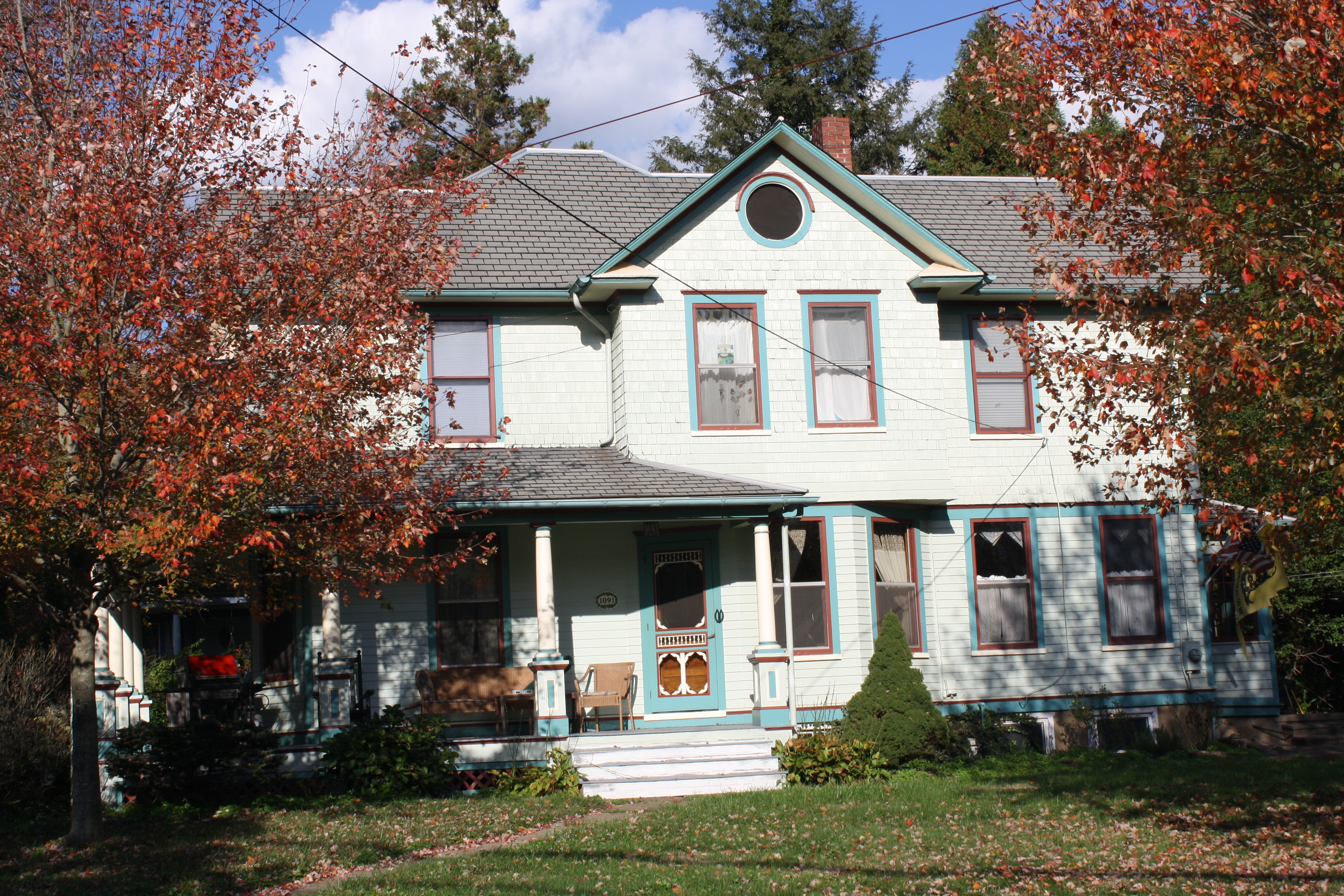
Township Line Road

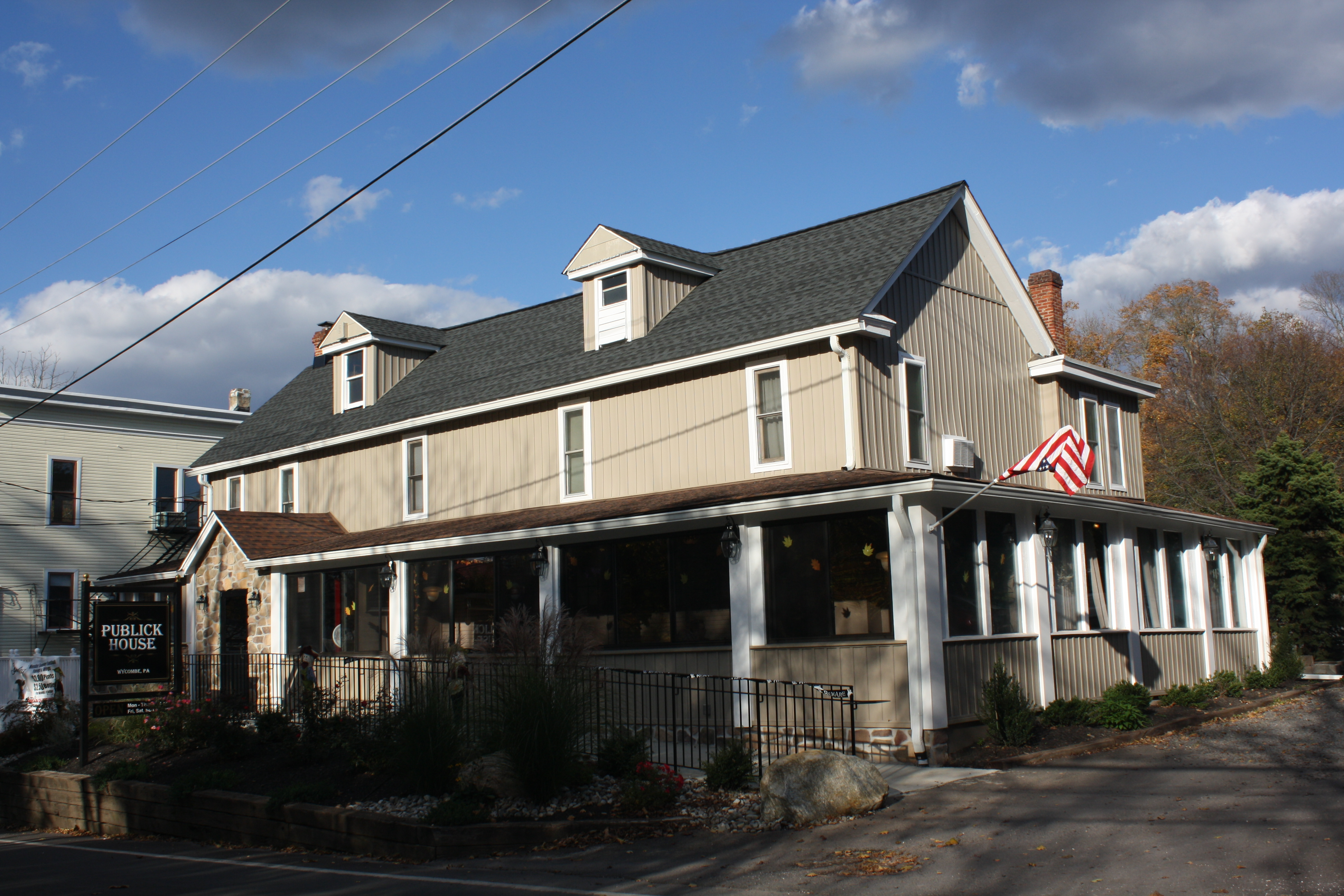
Mill Creek Road Public House

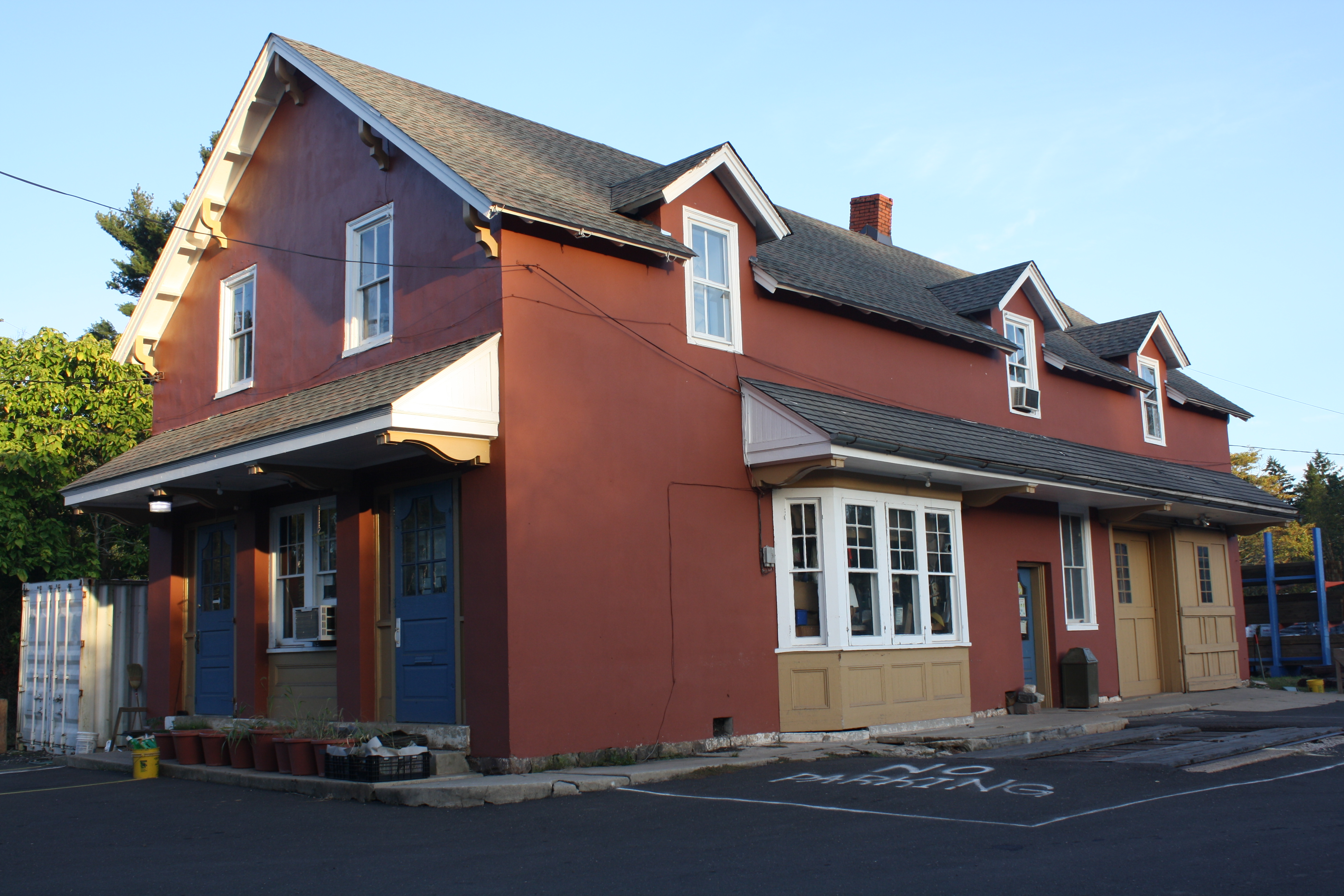
Coal and Lumber Yard

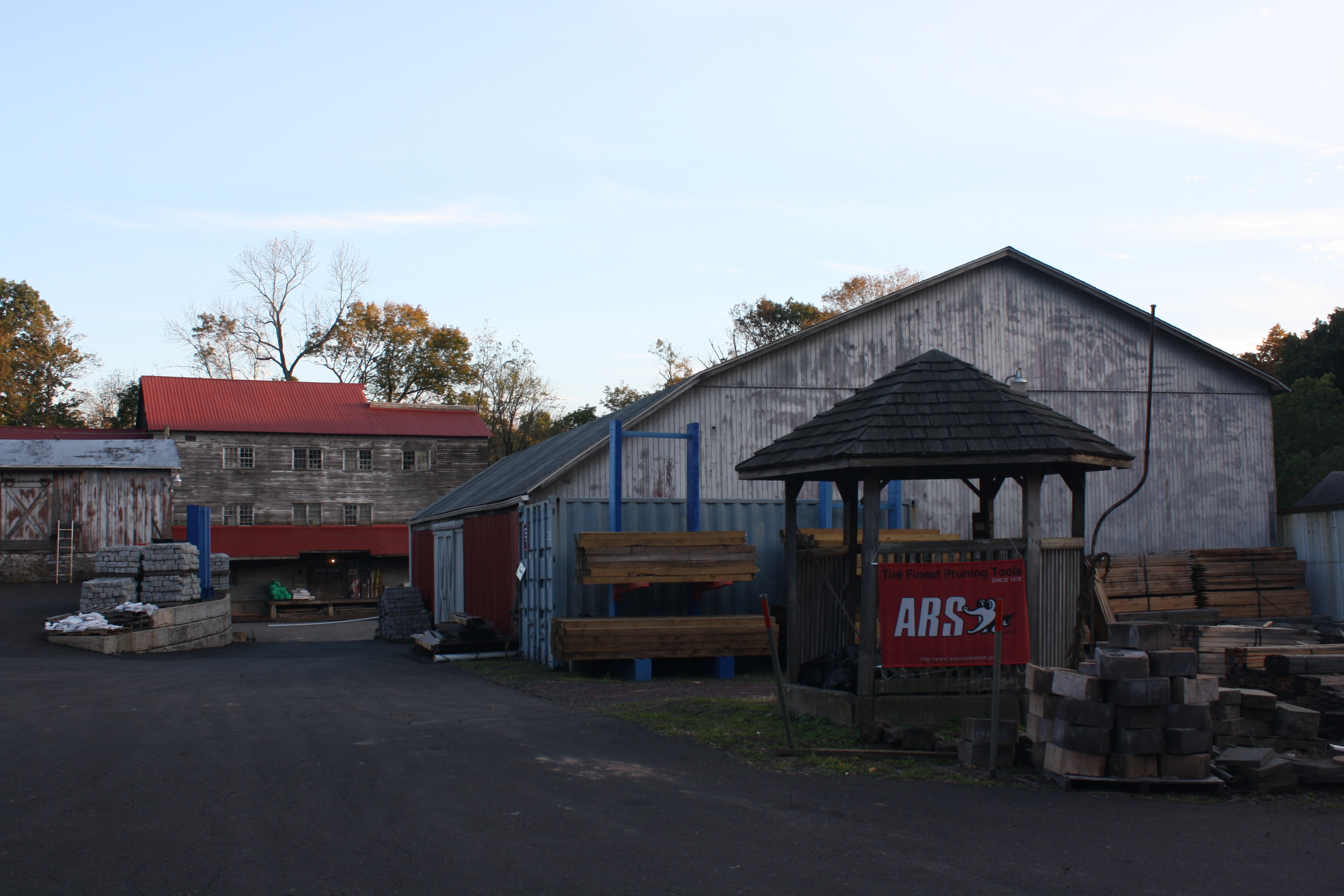
Coal and Lumber Yard
