= Penn's Park General Store Complex =

Historic commercial complex in Penn's Park, Pennsylvania, USA

- U.S. National Register of Historic Places
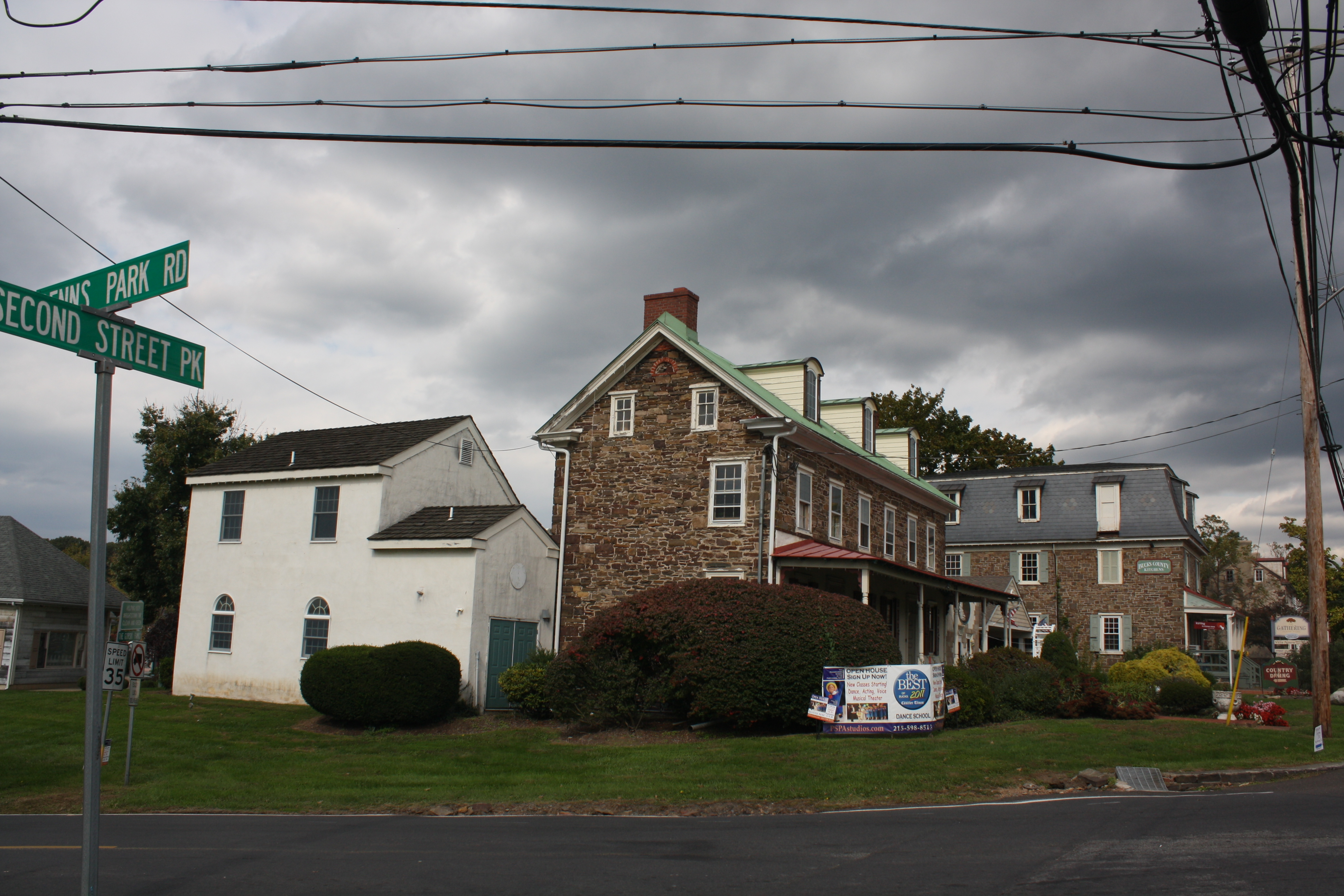
- Penn's Park General Store Complex, October 2012

- Location within Pennsylvania Location within the United States
- Location: 2310–2324 Second St. Pike, Wrightson Township, Penns Park, Pennsylvania
- Coordinates: 40°15′57″N 74°59′56″W
- Area: 2 acres (0.81 ha)
- Built: 1810, 1836
- Architectural style: Vernacular Georgian
- NRHP reference No.: 85000072
- Added to NRHP: January 8, 1985

The Penn's Park General Store Complex, also known as the Gaines Property, is an historic commercial complex that is located in Penn's Park, Wrightstown Township, Bucks County, Pennsylvania, United States.

Situated south of the Penns Park Historic District, it was added to the National Register of Historic Places in 1985.

== History and architectural features ==
This complex consists of three primary buildings: a farmhouse, store building, and a frame bank barn, along with six outbuildings. The farmhouse was built in 1810, and is a two-and-one-half-story, six-bay, rectangular, fieldstone building that was designed in the Georgian style. The store building was built in 1836, and is a three-story, three-bay by three-bay, fieldstone building. The outbuildings consist of a storage shed, wagon building, chicken house, livestock barn, woodshed, and outhouse. The store housed a post office until 1971.

== Gallery ==
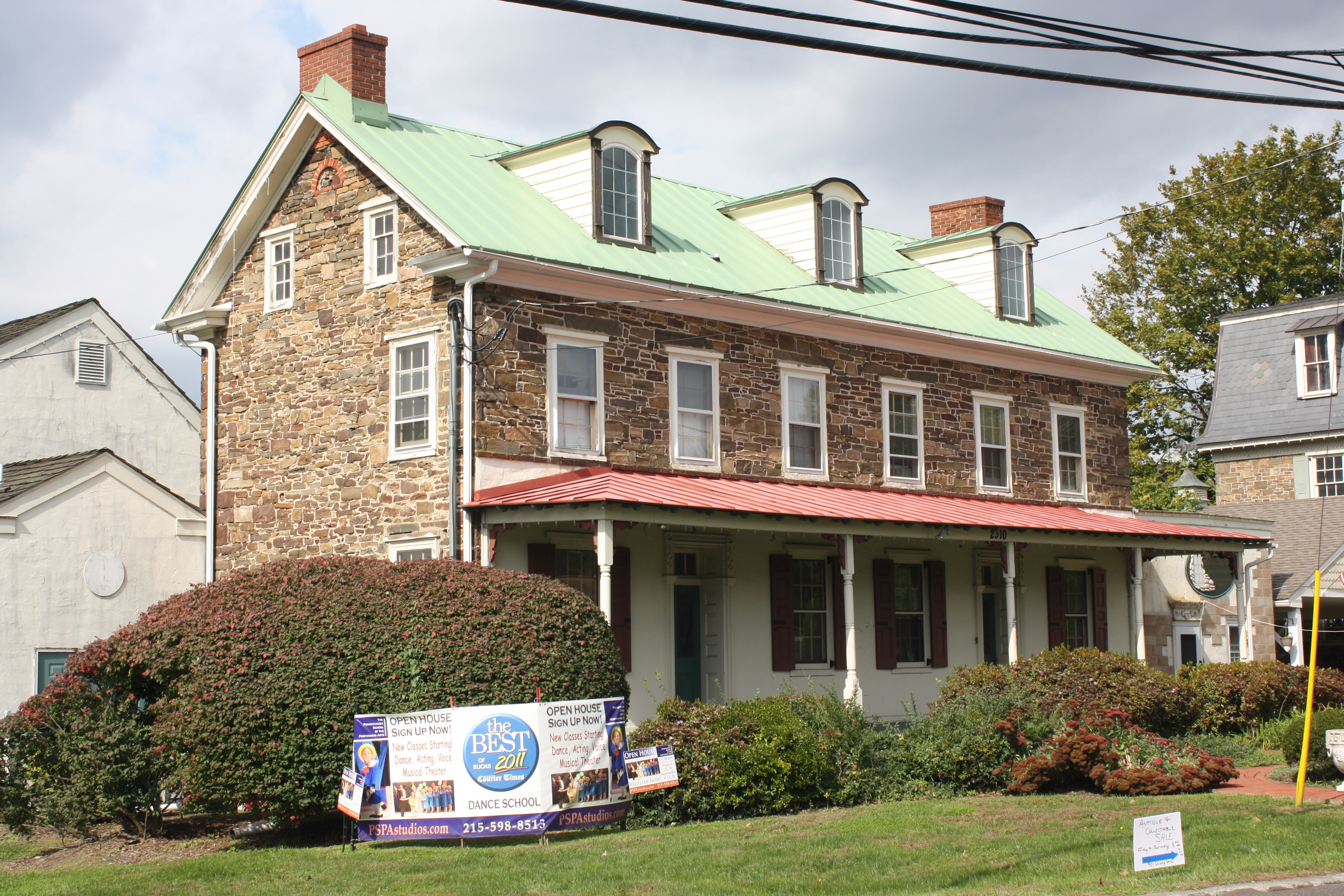
Farm House (1810).

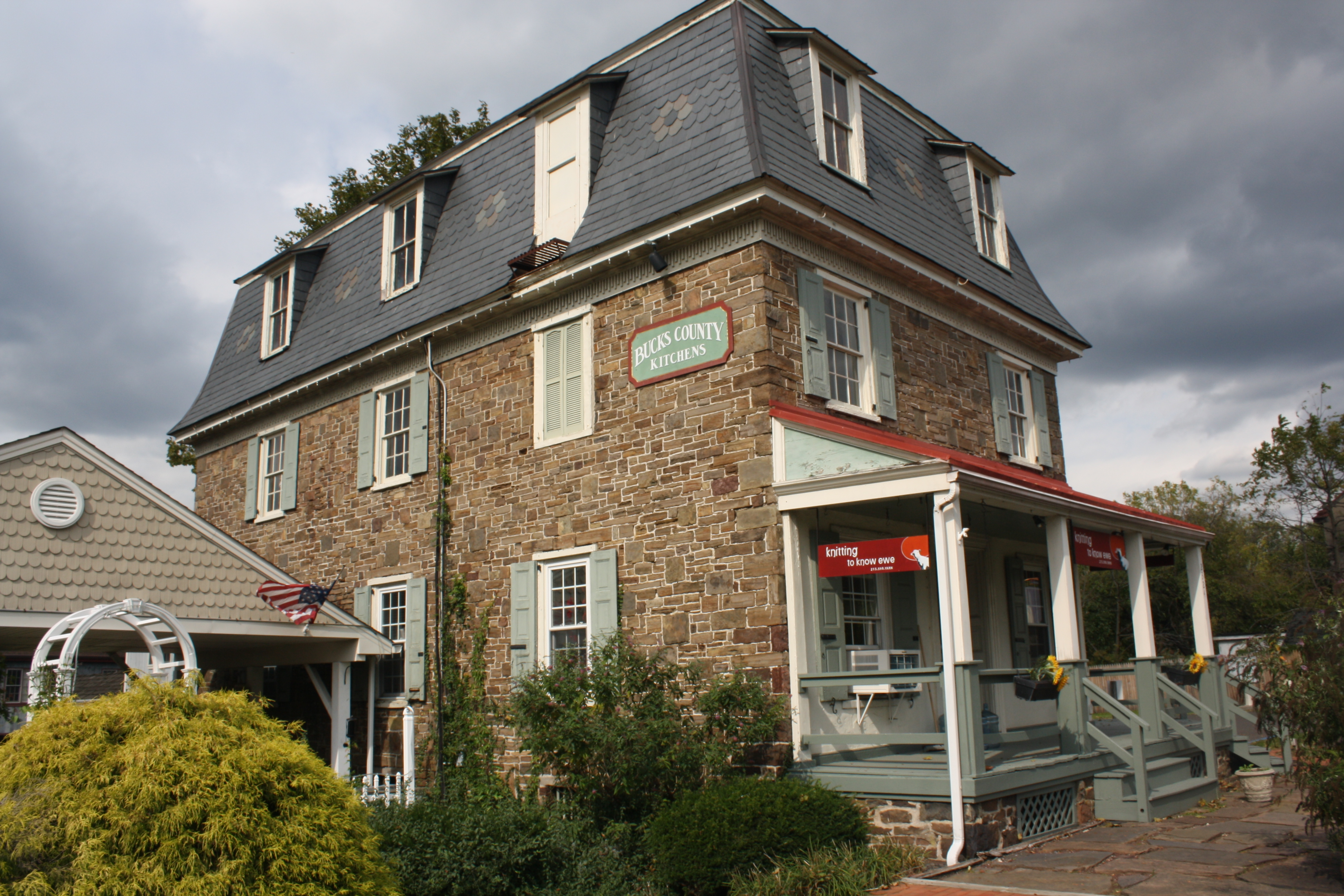
Store House (1836).

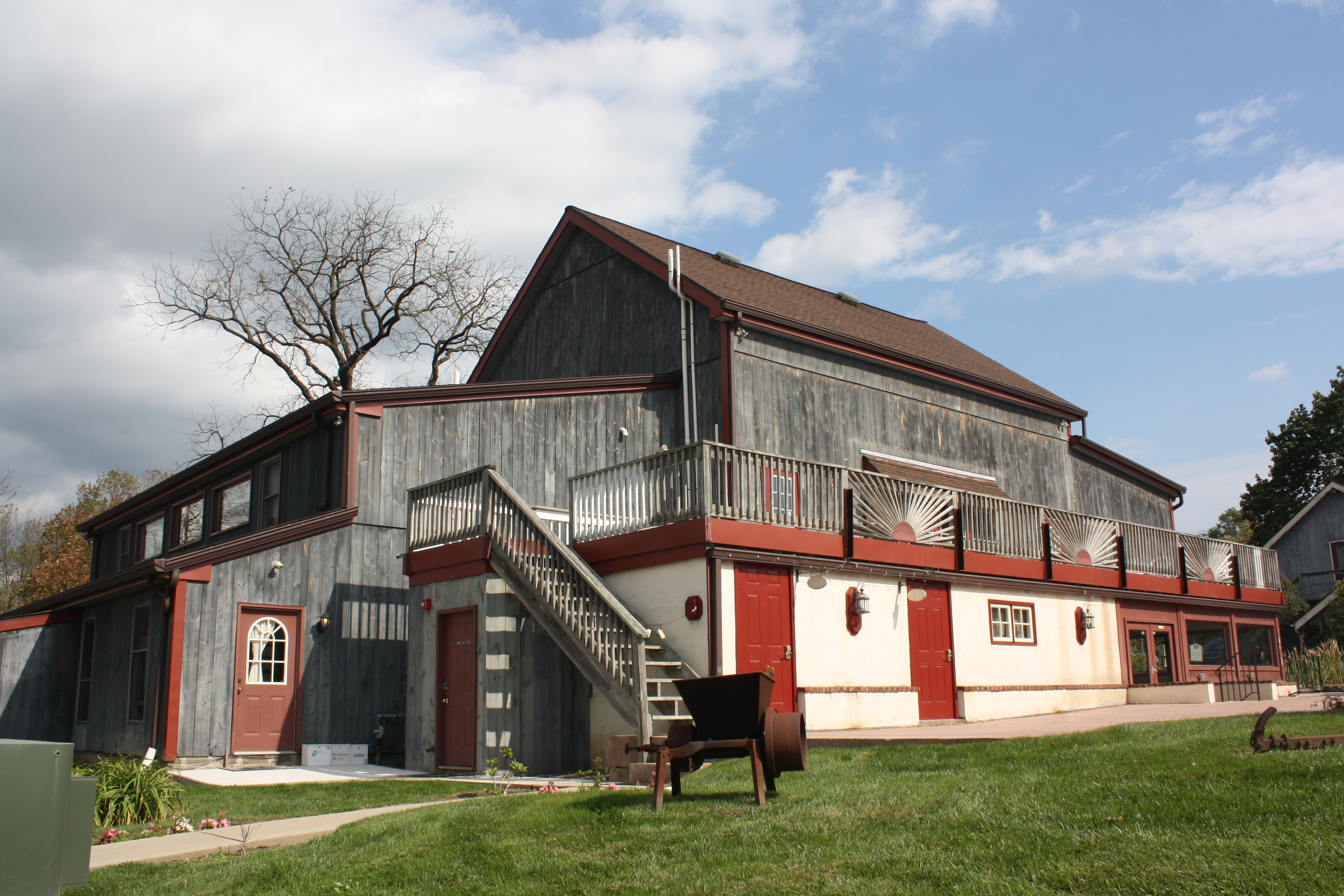
Bank Barn (west side).

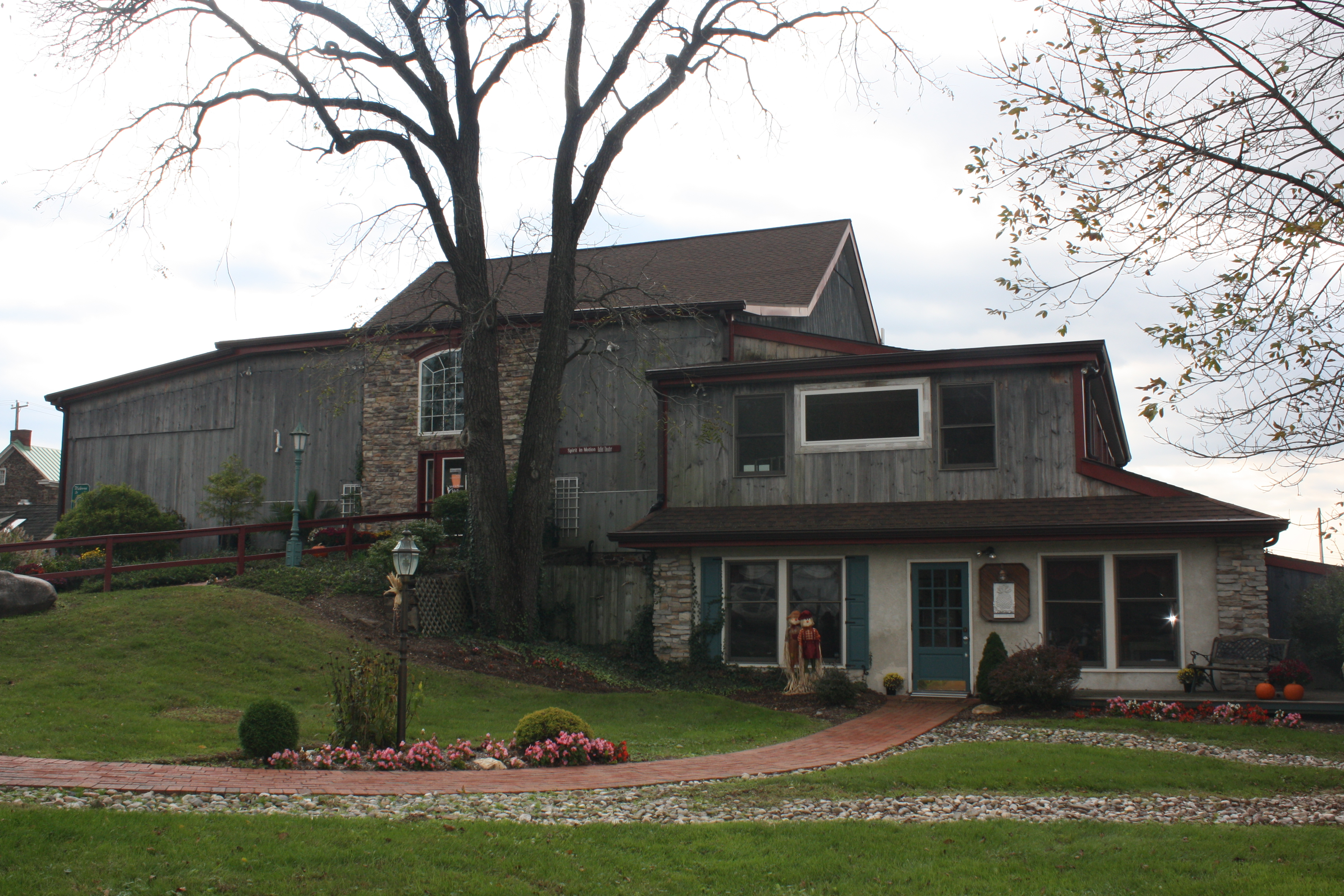
Bank Barn (north side).

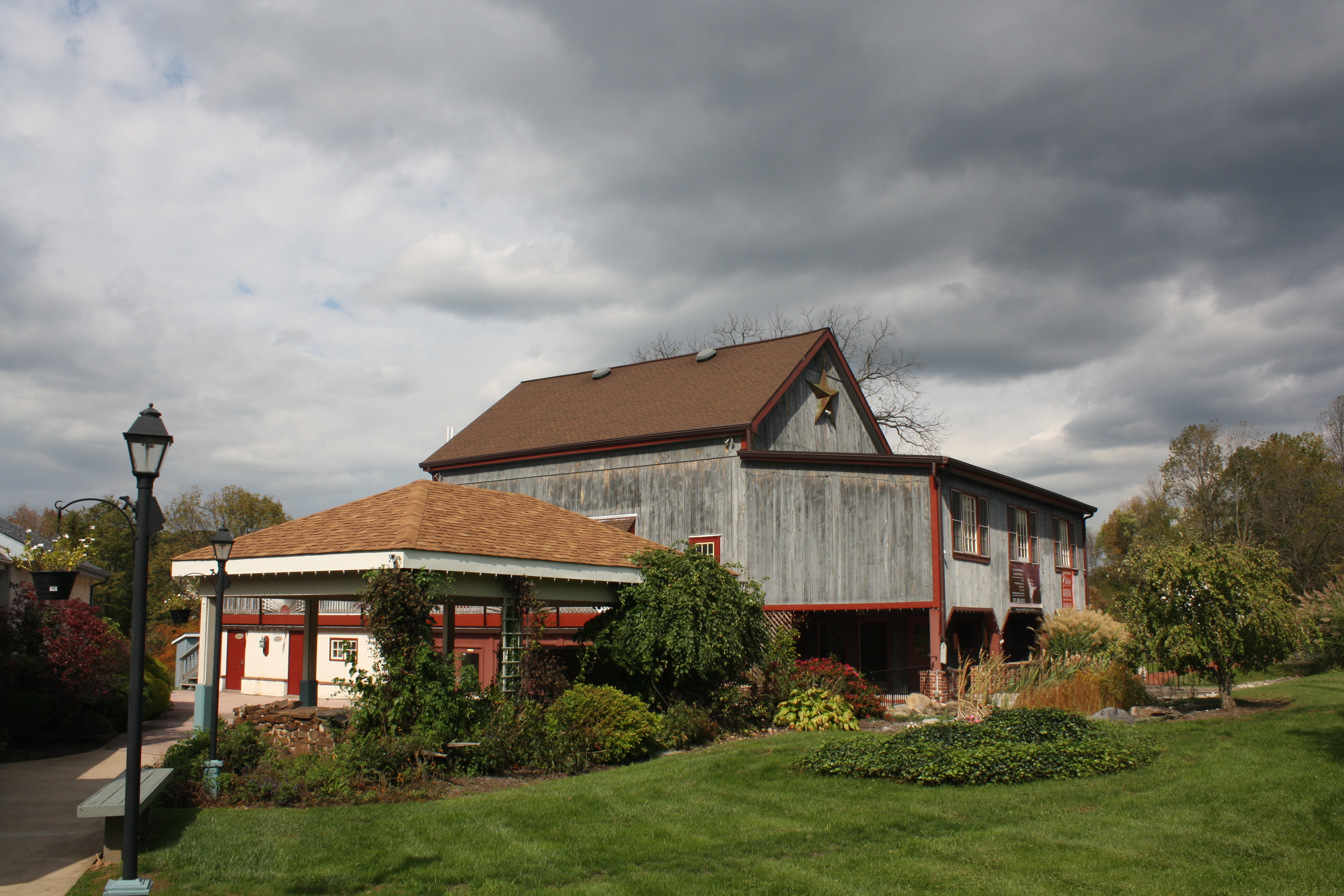
Central Plaza and Barn.
