= Logtown =

Logtown may refer to:

- Logtown, California, former name of Mariposa, California
- Logtown, New York, a hamlet located within Greenville, Orange County, New York
- Logtown, Pennsylvania, former name of Penns Park, Pennsylvania
