= Wycombe Stone Bridge =

- U.S. National Register of Historic Places
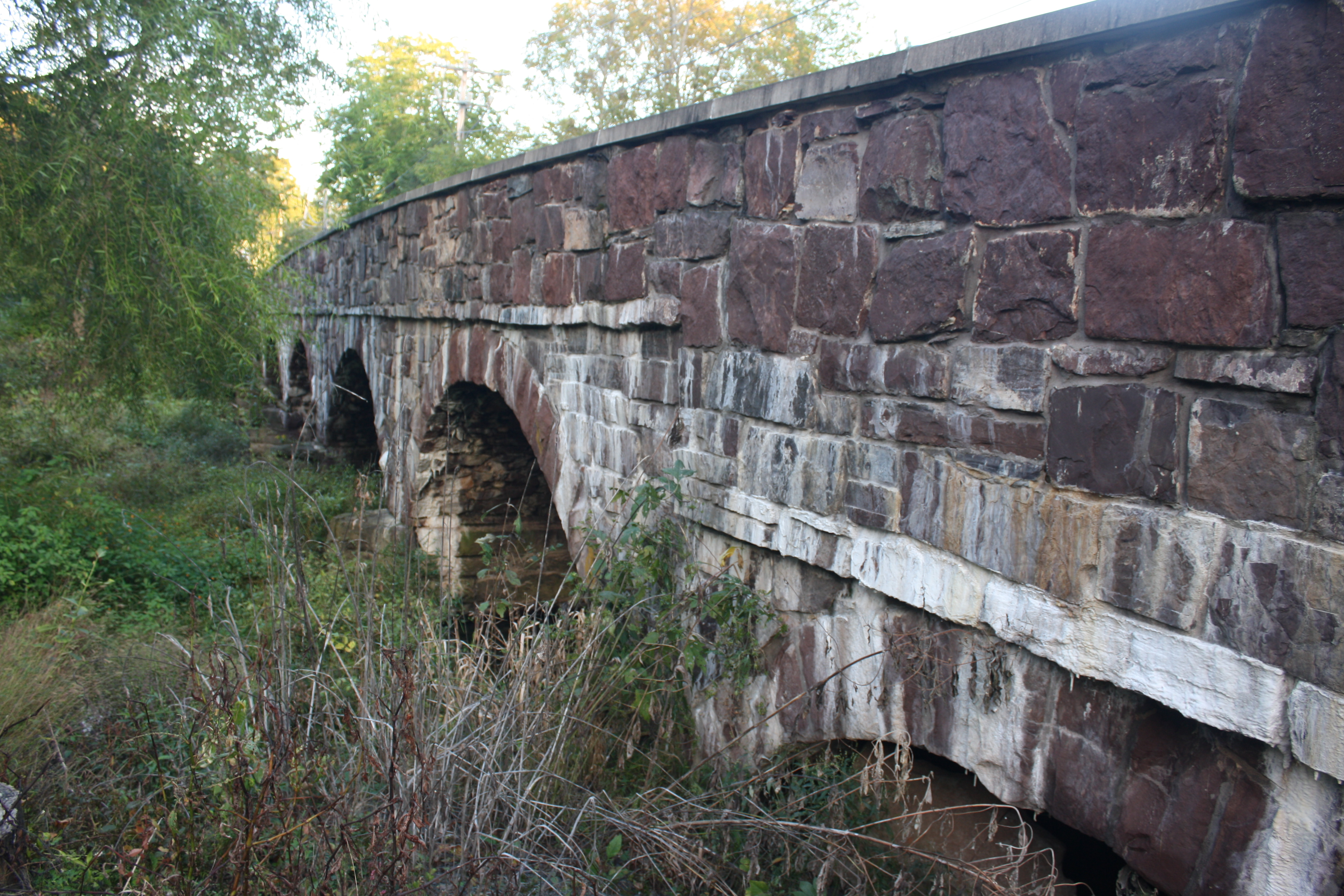
- Wycombe Stone Bridge, October 2012

- Location within Pennsylvania Location within the United States
- Location: Forest Grove Road over Mill Creek, Wycombe, Pennsylvania
- Coordinates: 40°16′53″N 75°1′19″W
- Area: less than one acre
- Built: 1905
- Architectural style: Multiple span stone arch
- MPS: Highway Bridges Owned by the Commonwealth of Pennsylvania, Department of Transportation TR
- NRHP reference No.: 88000786
- Added to NRHP: June 22, 1988

The Wycombe Stone Bridge is a historic stone arch bridge located at Wycombe in Buckingham Township, Bucks County, Pennsylvania. It has a total of six spans, four are 20 feet long and two 12 feet long, and was constructed in 1905. It is constructed of roughly squared stone.

It was listed on the National Register of Historic Places under the name Bridge in Buckingham Township in 1988.
