= Vansant Farmhouse =

Historic house in Pennsylvania, United States

- U.S. National Register of Historic Places
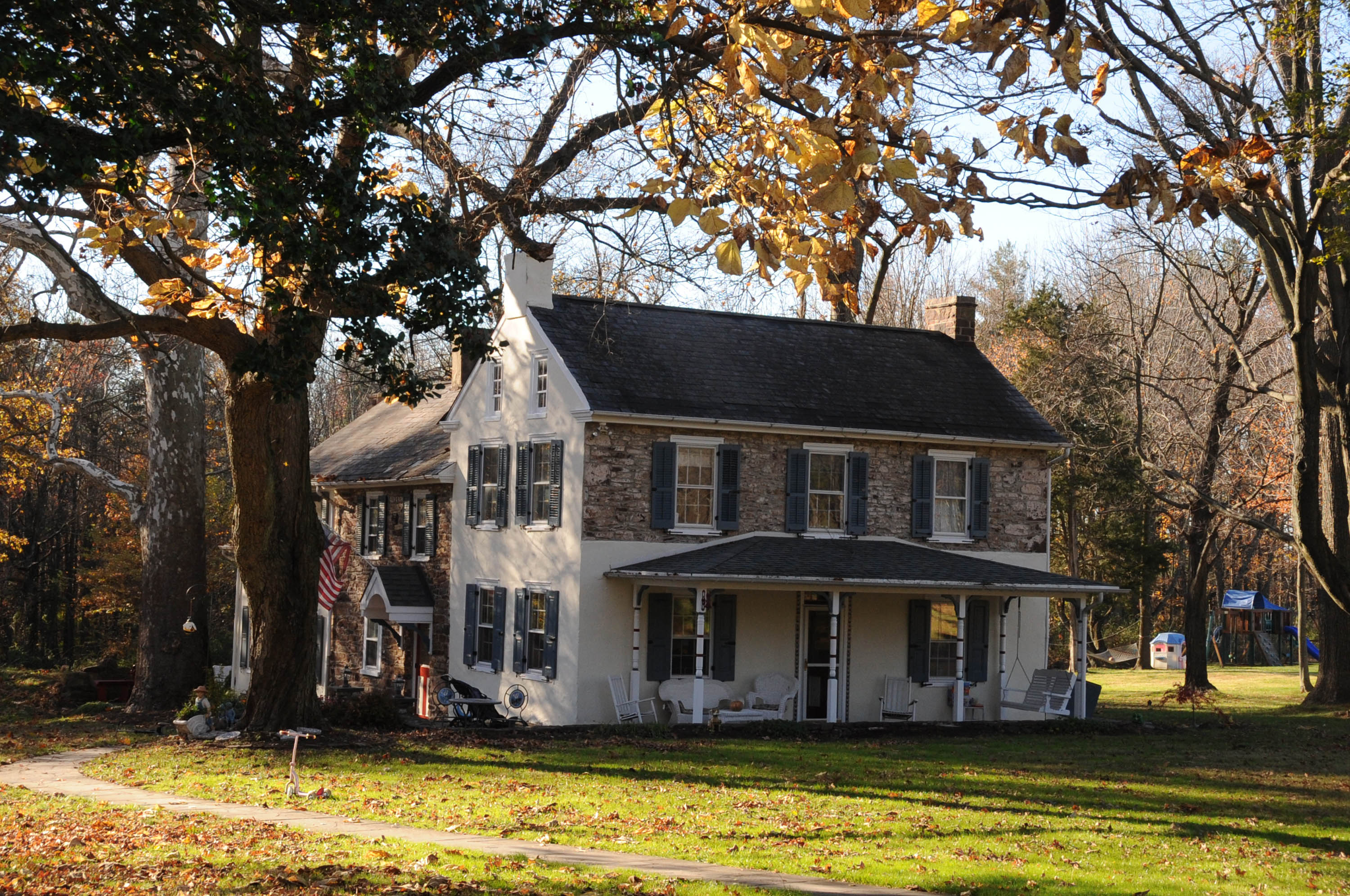

- Location within Pennsylvania Location within the United States
- Location: North of Rushland on Ceder Lane, near Rushland, Pennsylvania
- Coordinates: 40°16′14″N 75°1′8″W
- Area: 0.5 acres (0.20 ha)
- Built: 1768, c. 1820
- NRHP reference No.: 77001130
- Added to NRHP: August 2, 1977

The Vansant Farmhouse, also known as Overlook Valley Farm, is an historic home that is located near Rushland, Wrightstown Township, Bucks County, Pennsylvania, United States.

It was added to the National Register of Historic Places in 1977.

== History and architectural features ==
The original section of this historic farmhouse was built in 1768. It is a two-story stone structure that measures approximately fifteen feet square, and has a one-story kitchen addition. The main house was added circa 1820, and is a two-story, stuccoed-stone structure. A one-story porch was added during the twentieth century.
