= Penns Park, Pennsylvania =

Unincorporated community in Pennsylvania, US

- Unincorporated community
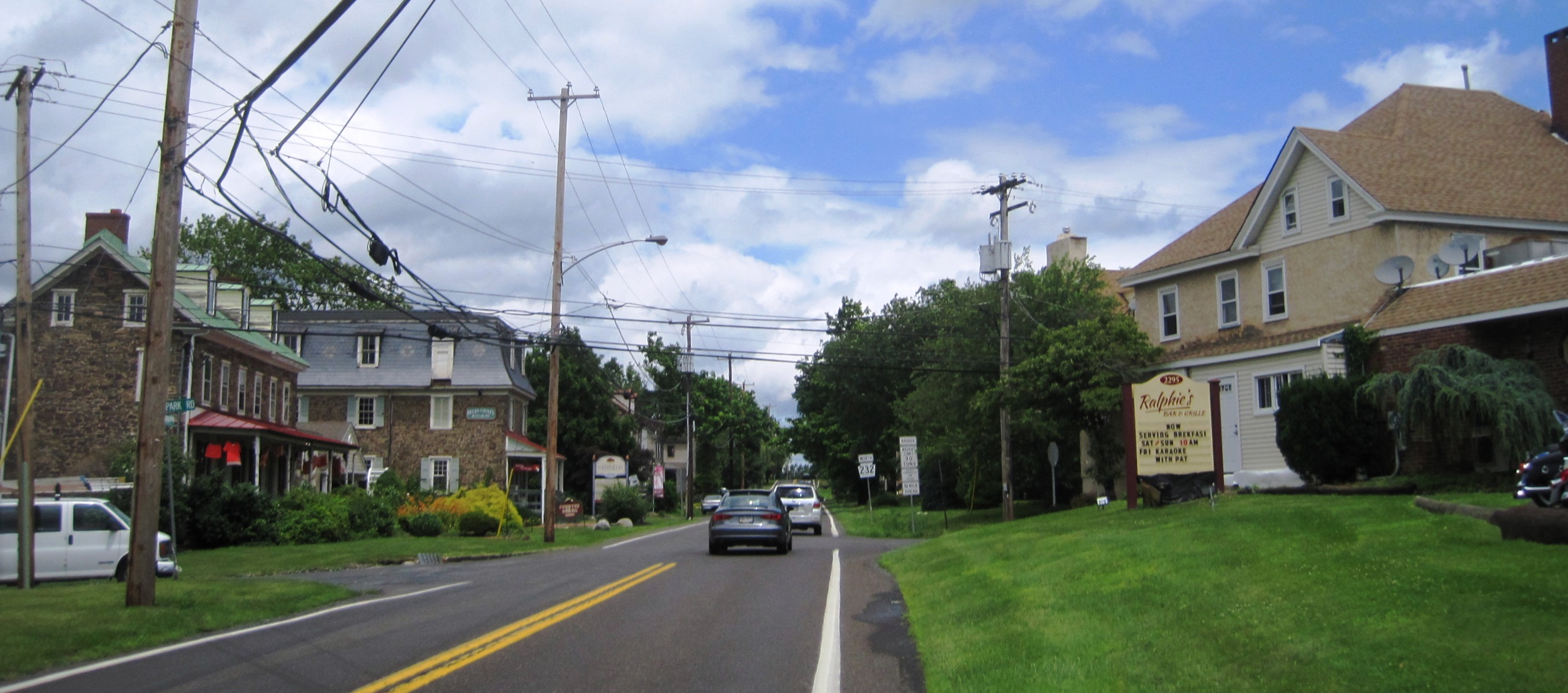
- Approaching Penns Park Road from northbound Second Street Pike (PA 232)

- Location within Pennsylvania Location within the United States
- Coordinates: 40°15′57″N 74°59′53″W
- Country: United States
- State: Pennsylvania
- County: Bucks
- Township: Wrightstown
- Elevation: 354 ft (108 m)
- Time zone: UTC-5 (Eastern (EST))
  - Summer (DST): UTC-4 (EDT)
- ZIP Code: 18943
- Area codes: 215, 267 and 445
- GNIS feature ID: 1204379

- Penns Park Historic District
- U.S. National Register of Historic Places
- U.S. Historic district
- Location within Pennsylvania Location within the United States
- Area: 31.5 acres (12.7 ha)
- Architectural style: Greek Revival, Gothic, Queen Anne
- NRHP reference No.: 86000349
- Added to NRHP: March 13, 1986

Penns Park is the oldest village in Wrightstown Township, Pennsylvania, United States. The village is located in the center of the township. The Zip Code is 18943.

== History ==
This crossroads village was known as Logtown as early as 1716 and as Pennsville during the early nineteenth century. In 1862, the village name was changed to its current one.

== Notable features ==
Situated just outside of this village, at the intersection of Penns Park Road and Mud Road, a solitary log house still exists. It is reportedly the oldest house in Bucks County.

The community's old graveyard, where many of the township's first settlers were buried, is located to the southwest.

The Penns Park Historic District and Penn's Park General Store Complex are listed on the National Register of Historic Places.
