= Wycombe, Pennsylvania =

Unincorporated community in Pennsylvania, US

- Unincorporated community
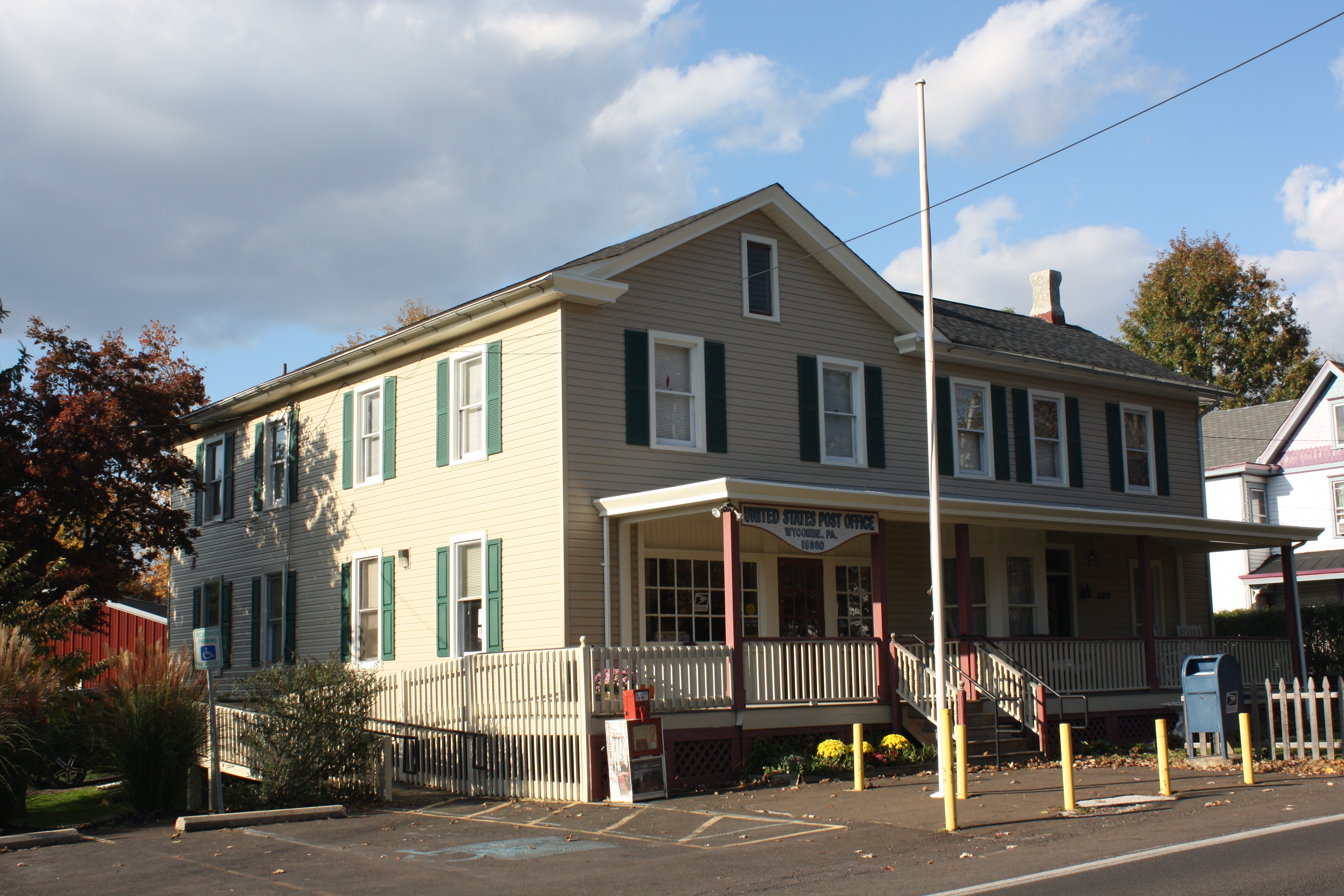
- Wycombe Post Office

- Location within Pennsylvania
- Coordinates: 40°16′56″N 75°01′08″W
- Country: United States
- State: Pennsylvania
- County: Bucks
- Township: Buckingham and Wrightstown
- Elevation: 190 ft (58 m)
- Time zone: UTC-5 (Eastern (EST))
  - Summer (DST): UTC-4 (EDT)
- ZIP code: 18980
- Area codes: 215, 267 and 445
- GNIS feature ID: 1191822

Wycombe is an unincorporated community primarily located in Wrightstown Township with a portion located in Buckingham Township, Bucks County, Pennsylvania, United States.

== History ==
Founded during the 1890s when the Pennsylvania Northeastern Railroad opened a line through the county, it was called "Lingohocken", the traditional Indian name of the area assigned by local residents. The post office was named Wycombe to prevent confusion with the post office in Wingohocken Pa. The Lingohocken Fire Company, which is located on the edge of town, retains this older name.

The New Hope Railroad still owns the rail line through the town, and having finished restoring the former Reading Company station building in 2011, intends to restore service through Wycombe. It also stores some of the line's original passenger cars in an area adjacent to the station. Those cars were last in service during the 1970s.

The Wycombe Stone Bridge, Gen. John Lacey Homestead, and Wycombe Village Historic District are listed on the National Register of Historic Places.
