= Isaiah Warner Farmstead =

- U.S. National Register of Historic Places
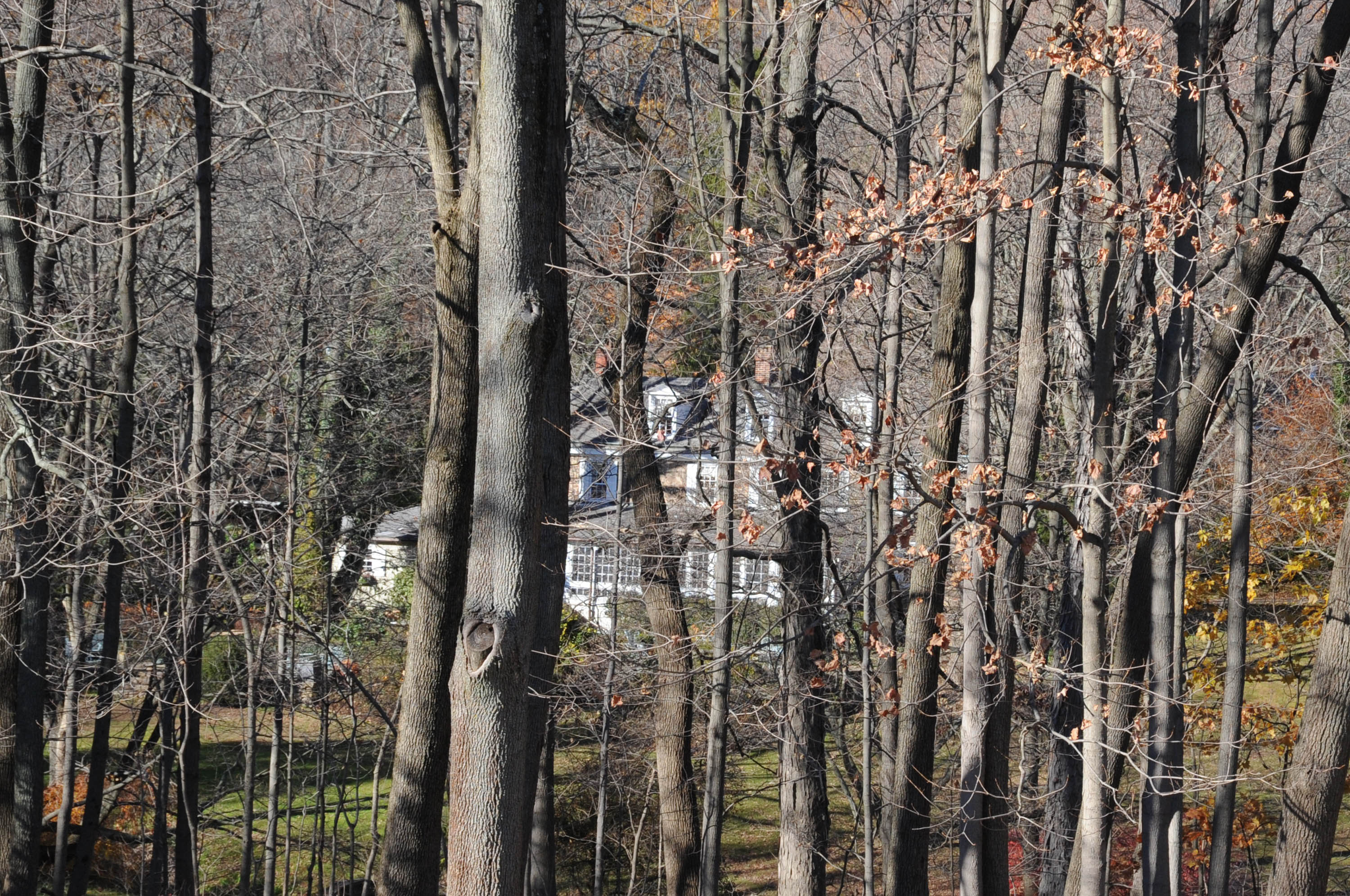
- Isaiah Warner Farmstead, November 2010

- Location within Pennsylvania Location within the United States
- Location: 60 Thompson Mill Rd., Wrightstown Township, Pennsylvania
- Coordinates: 40°17′16″N 74°58′40″W
- Area: 8.3 acres (3.4 ha)
- Architect: Martin, A. Oscar and Son
- Architectural style: Federal
- NRHP reference No.: 04000883
- Added to NRHP: August 20, 2004

The Isaiah Warner Farmstead is an historic home and farm complex that is located in Wrightstown Township, Bucks County, Pennsylvania, United States.

It was added to the National Register of Historic Places in 2004.

== History and architectural features ==
The original section of the house was built in 1793, with additions that date to circa 1830 and 1935. It is a two-and-one-half-story, stone farmhouse with a slate-covered gable roof that was erected in three sections. It measures sixty-four feet long and approximately twenty feet deep and as designed in the Federal style. Also located on the property are two two-story, nineteenth-century frame barns and a shed, a corn crib and a chicken house that date to the early 20th century.
