= Wrightstown, Pennsylvania =

Unincorporated community in Pennsylvania, US

- Unincorporated community
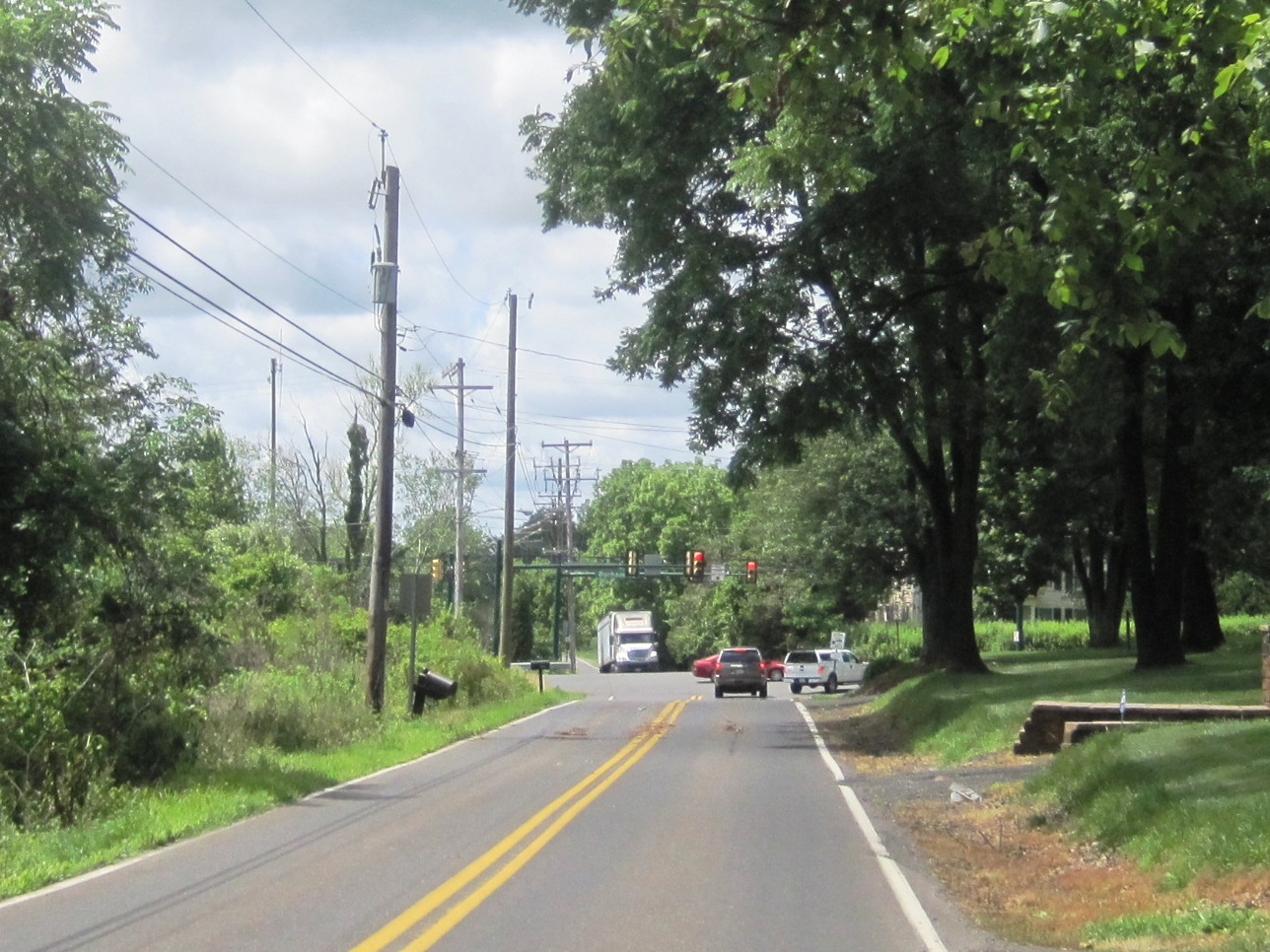
- Approaching center of Wrightstown from the east

- Location within Pennsylvania
- Coordinates: 40°16′0″N 74°59′0″W
- Country: United States
- State: Pennsylvania
- County: Bucks
- Township: Wrightstown
- Elevation: 364 ft (111 m)
- Time zone: UTC-5 (Eastern (EST))
  - Summer (DST): UTC-4 (EDT)
- Area codes: 215, 267, and 445
- GNIS feature ID: 1204999

Wrightstown is an unincorporated community in Wrightstown Township in Bucks County, Pennsylvania, United States. Wrightstown is located at the intersection of Pennsylvania Route 413 and Worthington Mill Road/Wrightstown Road.
