= Wrightstown Township, Bucks County, Pennsylvania =

Township in Pennsylvania, US

Wrightstown Township, Pennsylvania
- Township
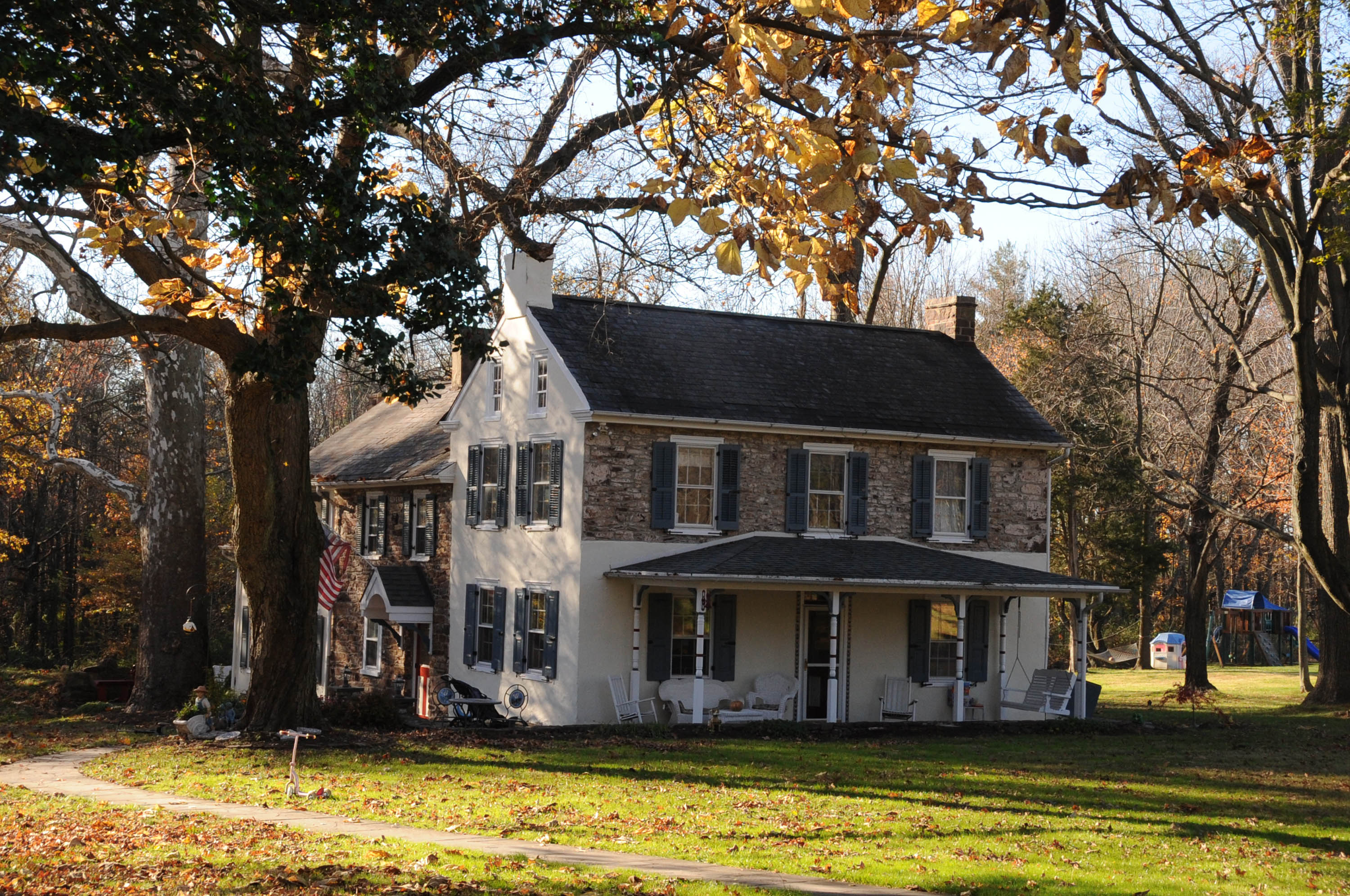
- Vansant Farmhouse, built 1768

- Seal

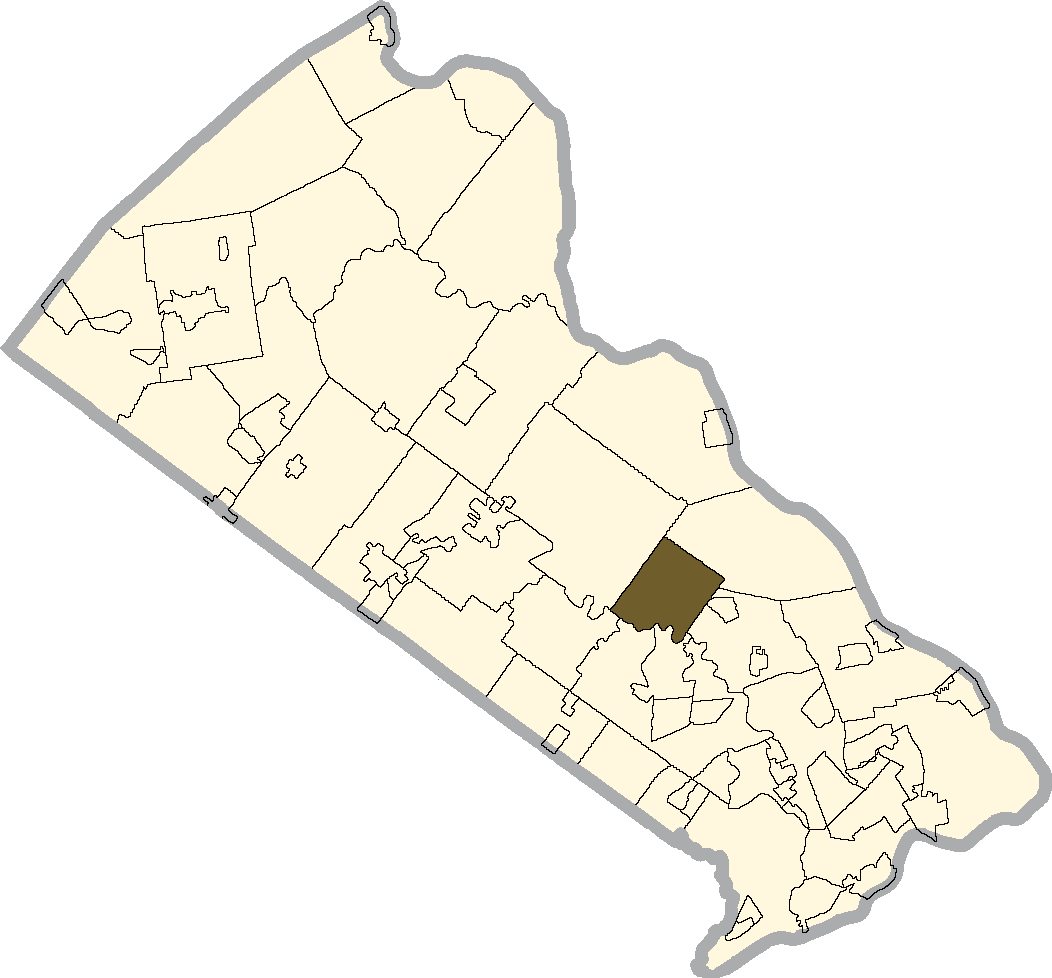
- Location of Wrightstown Township in Bucks County

- Location in Pennsylvania and the United States Wrightstown Township (the United States)
- Coordinates: 40°14′56″N 75°00′59″W
- Country: United States
- State: Pennsylvania
- County: Bucks

Area
  - Total: 9.78 sq mi (25.3 km^{2})
  - Land: 9.70 sq mi (25.1 km^{2})
  - Water: 0.08 sq mi (0.21 km^{2})
- Elevation: 125 ft (38 m)

Population (2010)
  - Total: 2,995
  - Estimate (2016): 3,099
  - Density: 309/sq mi (119/km^{2})
- Time zone: UTC-5 (EST)
  - Summer (DST): UTC-4 (EDT)
- Area codes: 215, 267 and 445
- FIPS code: 42-017-86624
- Website: wrightstownpa.org

Wrightstown Township is a township in Bucks County, Pennsylvania, United States. The population was 2,995 at the 2010 census.

== History ==
Wrightstown's first settler was John Chapman, who emigrated from England in October 1684, with his wife and children and settled on land which was part of the original William Penn Grant. According to legend, they first lived in a "cave" or "sod hut", probably on what is now Penns Park Road. Twin boys were born in their dwelling during the first winter, originating a long line of descendants, among whom was Henry Chapman Mercer. Although the first dwelling no longer exists, there are seven houses in the Township which were the homes of second and third generation Chapmans. William Smith, who arrived the year after the Chapmans, built a log house which still stands on Mud Road. In addition to the Smith house, there are 140 other houses in the Township which are at least 100 years old.

The boundaries of the Township were established by 1692. A square mile in the center, in the present Penns Park, was reserved for parkland. However, in 1719, this was divided among the surrounding property owners.

In addition to its basically rural character, much of the Wrightstown Township's charm is due to its five villages: Penns Park, Pineville, Rushland, Wrightstown and Wycombe. Each village at one time contained its own post office, a rather distinctive facet of life in the Township. Today, all but the Wrightstown Post Office remain, with home delivery available to approximately 50% of the Township through the Newtown Post Office. A small portion of the township is served with home mail delivery through the Furlong Post Office in neighboring Buckingham Township. Other past villages include Anchor and Chain Bridge.

The Penn's Park General Store Complex, Penns Park Historic District, William Smith House, Waldenmark, Isaiah Warner Farmstead, Wrightstown Friends Meeting Complex, Wrightstown Octagonal Schoolhouse, and Wycombe Village Historic District are listed on the National Register of Historic Places.

== Geography ==
According to the United States Census Bureau, the township has a total area of 10.0 square miles (25.8 km^{2}), of which 9.9 square miles (25.7 km^{2}) is land and 0.04 square mile (0.1 km^{2}) (0.30%) is water.

Natural features include Anchor Creek, Jericho Creek, Mill Creek, Neshaminy Creek including the Neshaminy Palisades, Newtown Creek, and Robin Run.

== Demographics ==
Historical population
Census	Pop.	Note	%±
1930	716		—
1940	799		11.6%
1950	909		13.8%
1960	1,734		90.8%
1970	2,266		30.7%
1980	2,207		−2.6%
1990	2,426		9.9%
2000	2,839		17.0%
2010	2,995		5.5%
2020	3,286		9.7%

As of the 2010 census, the township was 94.5% White, 1.4% Black or African American, 0.1% Native American, 2.8% Asian, and 0.8% were two or more races. 1.4% of the population were of Hispanic or Latino ancestry.

As of the census of 2000, there were 2,853 people, 890 households, and 785 families residing in the township. The population density was 286.0 inhabitants per square mile (110.4/km^{2}). There were 986 housing units at an average density of 99.3 per square mile (38.3/km^{2}).

There were 971 households, out of which 38.8% had children under the age of 18 living with them, 72.1% were married couples living together, 5.9% had a female householder with no husband present, and 19.1% were non-families. 14.6% of all households were made up of individuals, and 5.6% had someone living alone who was 65 years of age or older. The average household size was 2.92 and the average family size was 3.26.

In the township the population was spread out, with 27.9% under the age of 18, 5.6% from 18 to 24, 27.5% from 25 to 44, 29.1% from 45 to 64, and 9.9% who were 65 years of age or older. The median age was 40 years. For every 100 females there were 97.0 males. For every 100 females age 18 and over, there were 95.8 males.

The median income for a household in the township was $82,875, and the median income for a family was $92,372. Males had a median income of $66,435 versus $36,125 for females. The per capita income for the township was $42,623. About 2.9% of families and 3.2% of the population were below the poverty line, including 2.5% of those under age 18 and 2.5% of those age 65 or over.

== Climate ==
According to the Köppen climate classification system, Wrightstown Township, Pennsylvania has a hot-summer, wet all year, humid continental climate (Dfa). Dfa climates are characterized by at least one month having an average mean temperature ≤ 32.0 °F (≤ 0.0 °C), at least four months with an average mean temperature ≥ 50.0 °F (≥ 10.0 °C), at least one month with an average mean temperature ≥ 71.6 °F (≥ 22.0 °C), and no significant precipitation difference between seasons. During the summer months, episodes of extreme heat and humidity can occur with heat index values ≥ 100 °F (≥ 38 °C). On average, the wettest month of the year is July which corresponds with the annual peak in thunderstorm activity. During the winter months, episodes of extreme cold and wind can occur with wind chill values < 0 °F (< -18 °C). The plant hardiness zone is 6b with an average annual extreme minimum air temperature of -1.1 °F (-18.4 °C). The average seasonal (Nov-Apr) snowfall total is between 24 and 30 inches (61 and 76 cm), and the average snowiest month is February which corresponds with the annual peak in nor'easter activity.

Climate data for Wrightstown Township, Bucks County, Pennsylvania (1981 – 2010 averages)
Month	Jan	Feb	Mar	Apr	May	Jun	Jul	Aug	Sep	Oct	Nov	Dec	Year
Mean daily maximum °F (°C)	39.6 (4.2)	42.8 (6.0)	51.1 (10.6)	63.0 (17.2)	72.8 (22.7)	81.8 (27.7)	86.1 (30.1)	84.4 (29.1)	77.5 (25.3)	66.2 (19.0)	55.1 (12.8)	43.9 (6.6)	63.8 (17.7)
Daily mean °F (°C)	31.2 (−0.4)	34.0 (1.1)	41.4 (5.2)	52.2 (11.2)	61.7 (16.5)	71.2 (21.8)	75.8 (24.3)	74.2 (23.4)	67.0 (19.4)	55.3 (12.9)	45.6 (7.6)	35.8 (2.1)	53.9 (12.2)
Mean daily minimum °F (°C)	22.9 (−5.1)	25.1 (−3.8)	31.8 (−0.1)	41.4 (5.2)	50.7 (10.4)	60.5 (15.8)	65.5 (18.6)	64.1 (17.8)	56.5 (13.6)	44.4 (6.9)	36.1 (2.3)	27.6 (−2.4)	44.0 (6.7)
Average precipitation inches (mm)	3.49 (89)	2.75 (70)	4.07 (103)	3.99 (101)	4.31 (109)	4.37 (111)	5.19 (132)	4.25 (108)	4.42 (112)	3.90 (99)	3.68 (93)	4.05 (103)	48.47 (1,231)
Average relative humidity (%)	66.4	62.7	58.7	57.6	62.1	66.1	66.6	69.1	70.0	69.3	67.9	68.1	65.4
Average dew point °F (°C)	21.3 (−5.9)	22.6 (−5.2)	28.0 (−2.2)	37.7 (3.2)	48.6 (9.2)	59.3 (15.2)	63.9 (17.7)	63.4 (17.4)	56.9 (13.8)	45.4 (7.4)	35.6 (2.0)	26.3 (−3.2)	42.5 (5.8)
Source: PRISM Climate Group

== Transportation ==
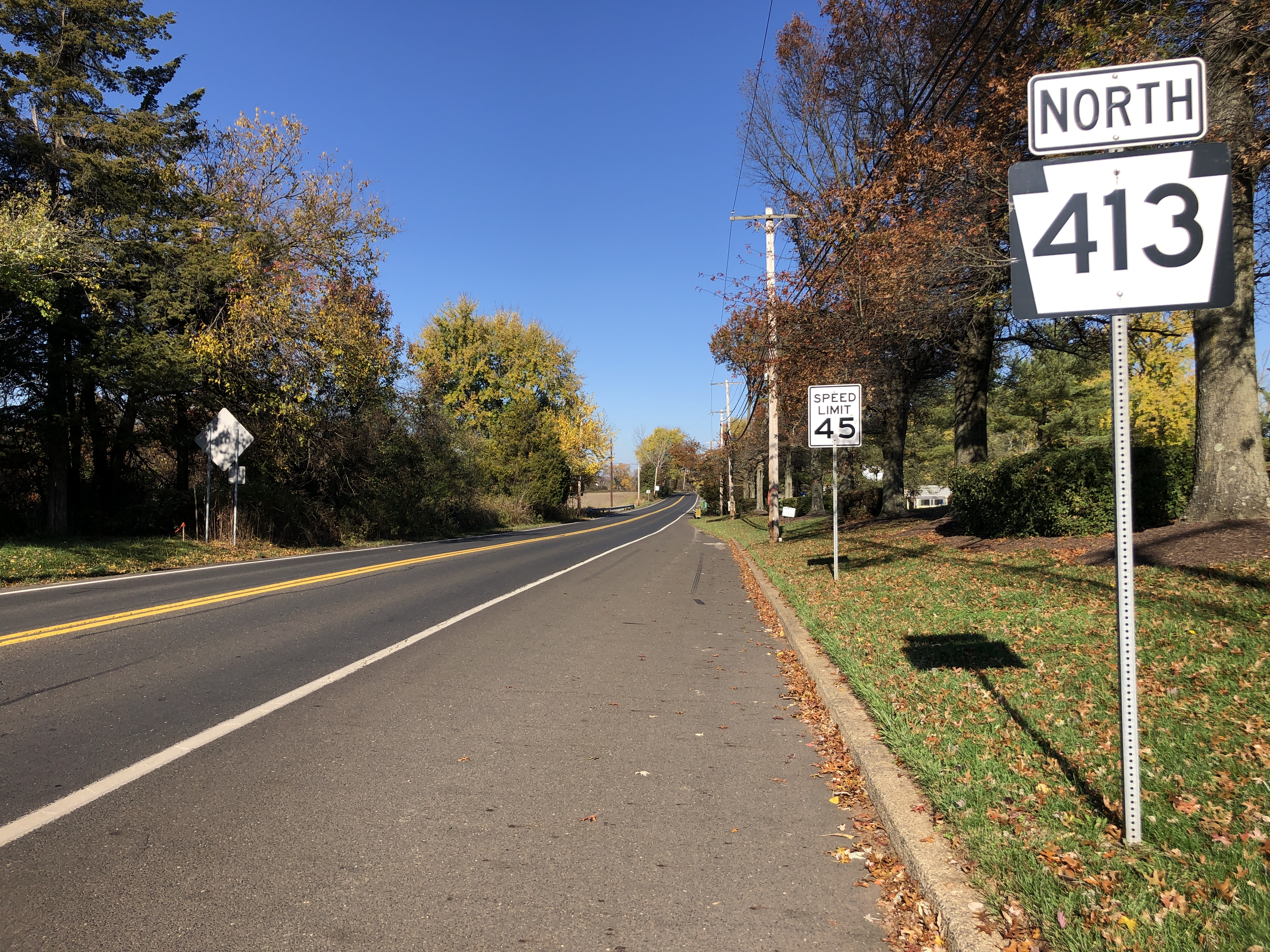
PA 413 northbound in Wrightstown Township

As of 2022 there were 40.27 miles (64.81 km) of public roads in Wrightstown Township, of which 19.26 miles (31.00 km) were maintained by the Pennsylvania Department of Transportation (PennDOT) and 21.01 miles (33.81 km) were maintained by the township.

Pennsylvania Route 232 and Pennsylvania Route 413 are the numbered highways traversing Wrightstown Township. PA 232 follows Second Street Pike and Windy Bush Road along a north-south alignment through the central portion of the township, while PA 413 follows Durham Road along a southeast-northwest alignment across northern and eastern portions of the township.

== Ecology ==
According to the A. W. Kuchler U.S. potential natural vegetation types, Wrightstown Township, Pennsylvania would have an Appalachian Oak (104) vegetation type with an Eastern Hardwood Forest (25) vegetation form.
