= Rushland, Pennsylvania =

Unincorporated community in Pennsylvania, US

- Unincorporated community
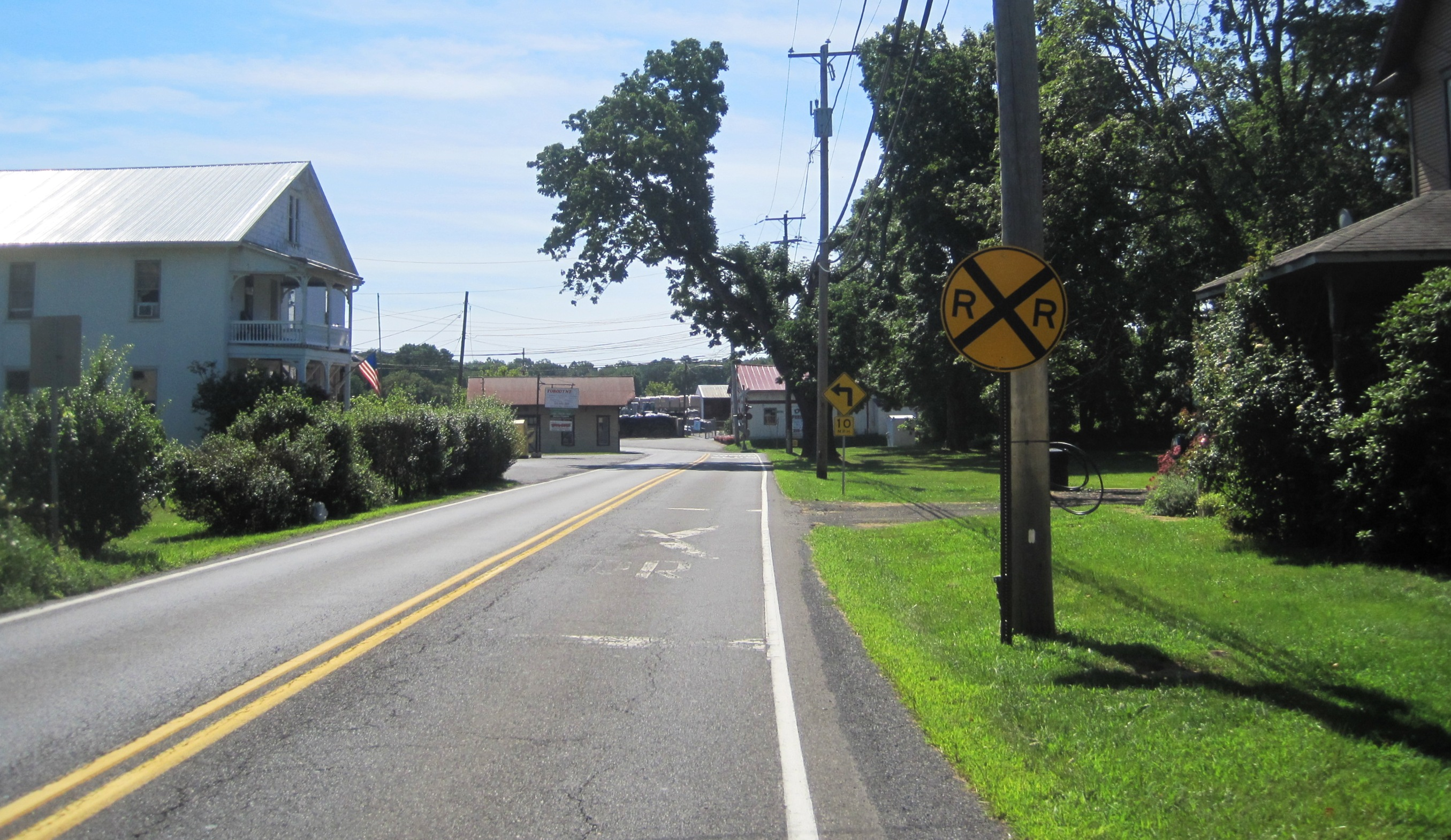

- Location within Pennsylvania
- Coordinates: 40°15′27″N 75°01′51″W
- Country: United States
- State: Pennsylvania
- County: Bucks
- Township: Wrightstown
- Elevation: 157 ft (48 m)
- Time zone: UTC-5 (Eastern (EST))
  - Summer (DST): UTC-4 (EDT)
- ZIP Code: 18956
- Area codes: 215, 267 and 445
- GNIS feature ID: 1204561

Rushland is an unincorporated community that is located in the northwestern corner of Wrightstown Township, Bucks County, Pennsylvania, United States.

== History ==
This community was originally named for Joseph Sackett, who came here in 1730. It was called Sackett's Ford from 1750 to approximately 1800. Sackett built a grist mill store and blacksmith shop near Mill Creek where it joined the Neshaminy Creek. Some authorities claim that the name of the hamlet, first Rush Valley and later Rushland, was due to the availability of "scouring rushes" used by early settlers for cleaning pots and pans.

On December 29, 1883 a post office was established under the name Rush Valley. In 1894, the name was changed to Rushland.

Located along the Mill Creek near Rushland was a settlement started by Italian immigrants, who came to the area as laborers when the railroad was being built in the last decade of the nineteenth century. Their community became known as Little Italy. By forcing its way through a rocky cliff, the railroad opened a major industry for Rushland, the stone quarry, an industry that continues to this day. The New Hope & Ivyland Railroad passes through Rushland on the former Reading New Hope Branch and the old depot still stands to day.

== Notable features ==
The Vansant Farmhouse was listed on the National Register of Historic Places in 1977.
