= Waldenmark =

Historic house in Pennsylvania, United States

- U.S. National Register of Historic Places
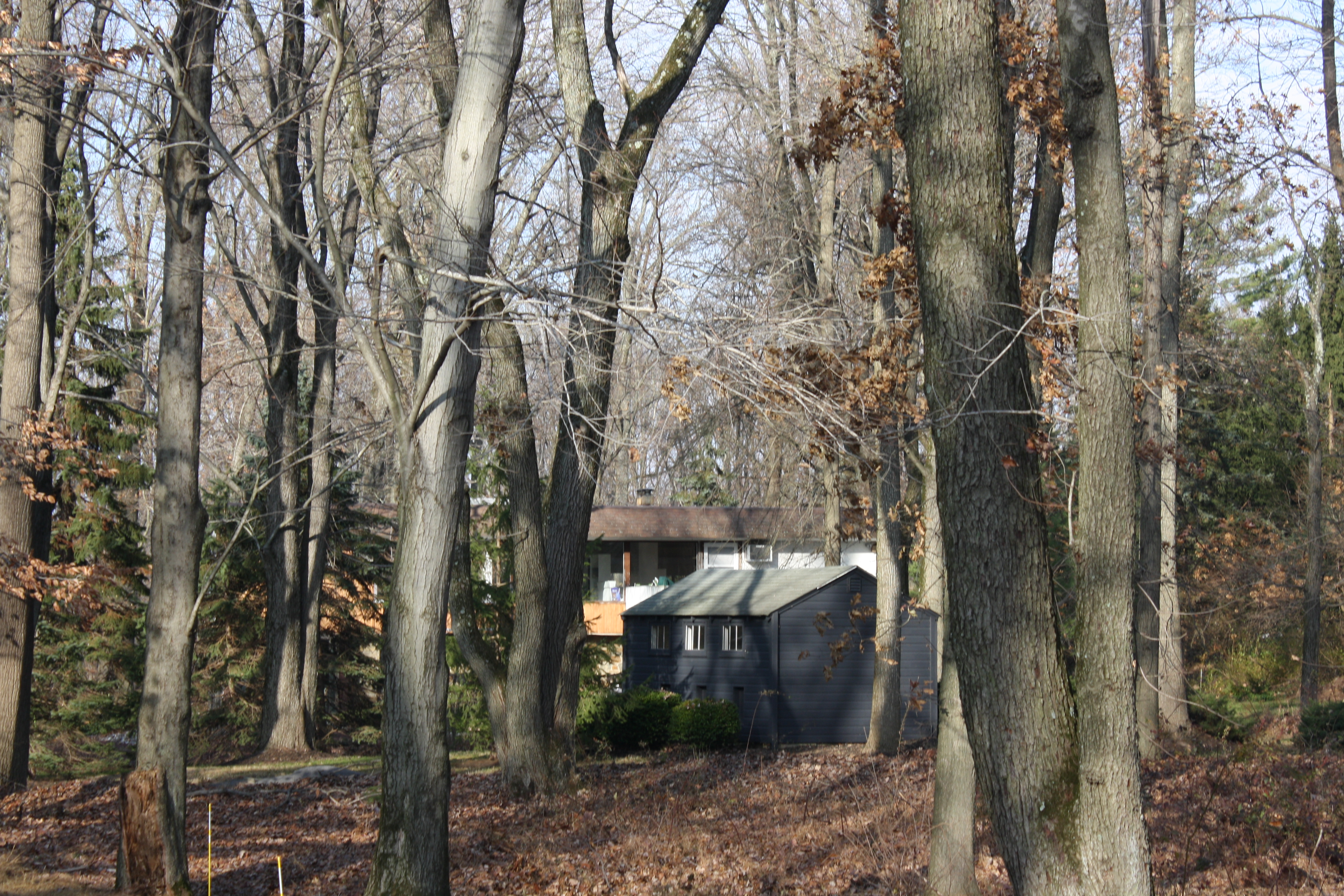
- Waldenmark, Guesthouse and outbuilding. November 2012.

- Location within Pennsylvania Location within the United States
- Location: 1280 & 1300 Wrightstown Rd., Wrightstown Township, Pennsylvania
- Coordinates: 40°16′25.7″N 74°58′07.6″W
- Area: 17 acres (6.9 ha)
- Built: 1939, 1948
- Built by: Large, Roy
- Architect: Gropius, Walter; Breuer, Marcel
- Architectural style: International Style
- NRHP reference No.: 01000924
- Added to NRHP: August 30, 2001

Waldenmark, also known as the Edward Fischer House, is an historic house, studio, garage, and guesthouse complex in Wrightstown Township, Bucks County, Pennsylvania, United States.

The house, studio, and garage were designed by architects Walter Gropius and Marcel Breuer and built in 1939. The guesthouse was completed in 1948 and was designed by Breuer. The main house is a two-level, flat roofed dwelling in the International Style. A frame structure with redwood and stone sections, it features curved walls, ribbon windows, and a freeform stone patio. The studio is a frame structure with redwood siding with a saltbox and shed roof profile. The guesthouse is a long, two-story building with a cantilevered second floor and uneven gable roof. The complex was built for artist Edward L. Fischer and his wife Margrit, who were friends of Gropius and Breuer through Bauhaus.

It was added to the National Register of Historic Places in 2001.
