= Gen. John Lacey Homestead =

Historic house in Pennsylvania, United States

- U.S. National Register of Historic Places
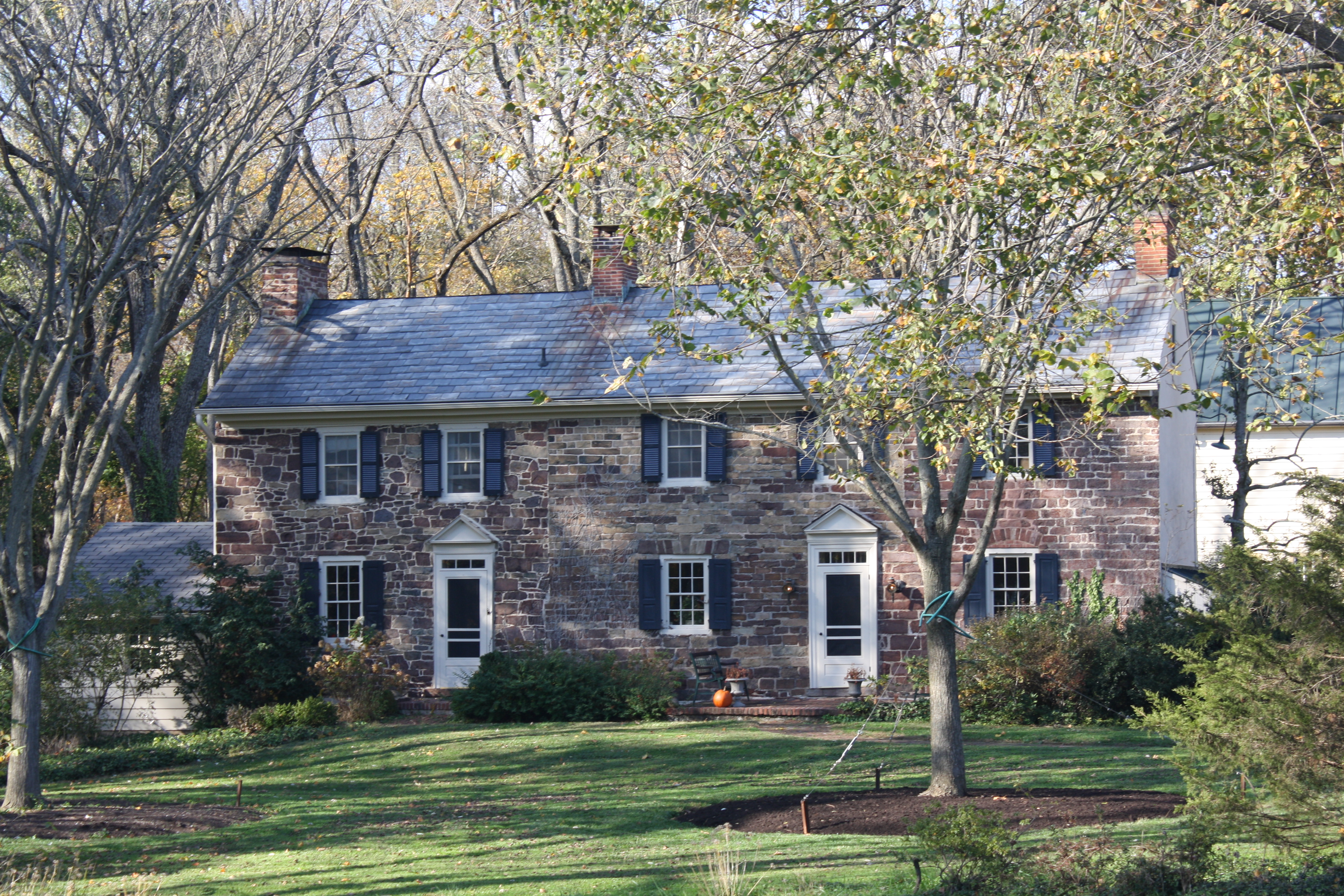
- Gen. John Lacey Homestead, October 2012

- Location within Pennsylvania Location within the United States
- Location: Forest Grove Rd., Buckingham Township, Wycombe, Pennsylvania
- Coordinates: 40°16′58.4″N 75°1′13.2″W
- Area: 2 acres (0.81 ha)
- Built: 1755
- Built by: John Lacey
- NRHP reference No.: 80003448
- Added to NRHP: December 2, 1980

Gen. John Lacey Homestead is a historic home located at Wycombe, Buckingham Township, Bucks County, Pennsylvania. It was built in six sections over 200 years, with the earliest constructed in 1755. The oldest section is a 2 1/2-story, random-fieldstone structure with a slate-covered gable roof. Attached to it are two 2 1/2-story, fieldstone sections with slate gable roofs. The fourth section is a 1 1/2-story, plaster-covered stone section. The fifth section is a 1 1/2-story, enclosed porch with a shed roof. The sixth section is a 1 1/2-story, frame section with a gable roof. It was the home of Revolutionary War General John Lacey (1755–1814).

It was added to the National Register of Historic Places in 1980.
