= Penns Park Historic District =

Historic district in Pennsylvania, United States

- U.S. National Register of Historic Places
- U.S. Historic district
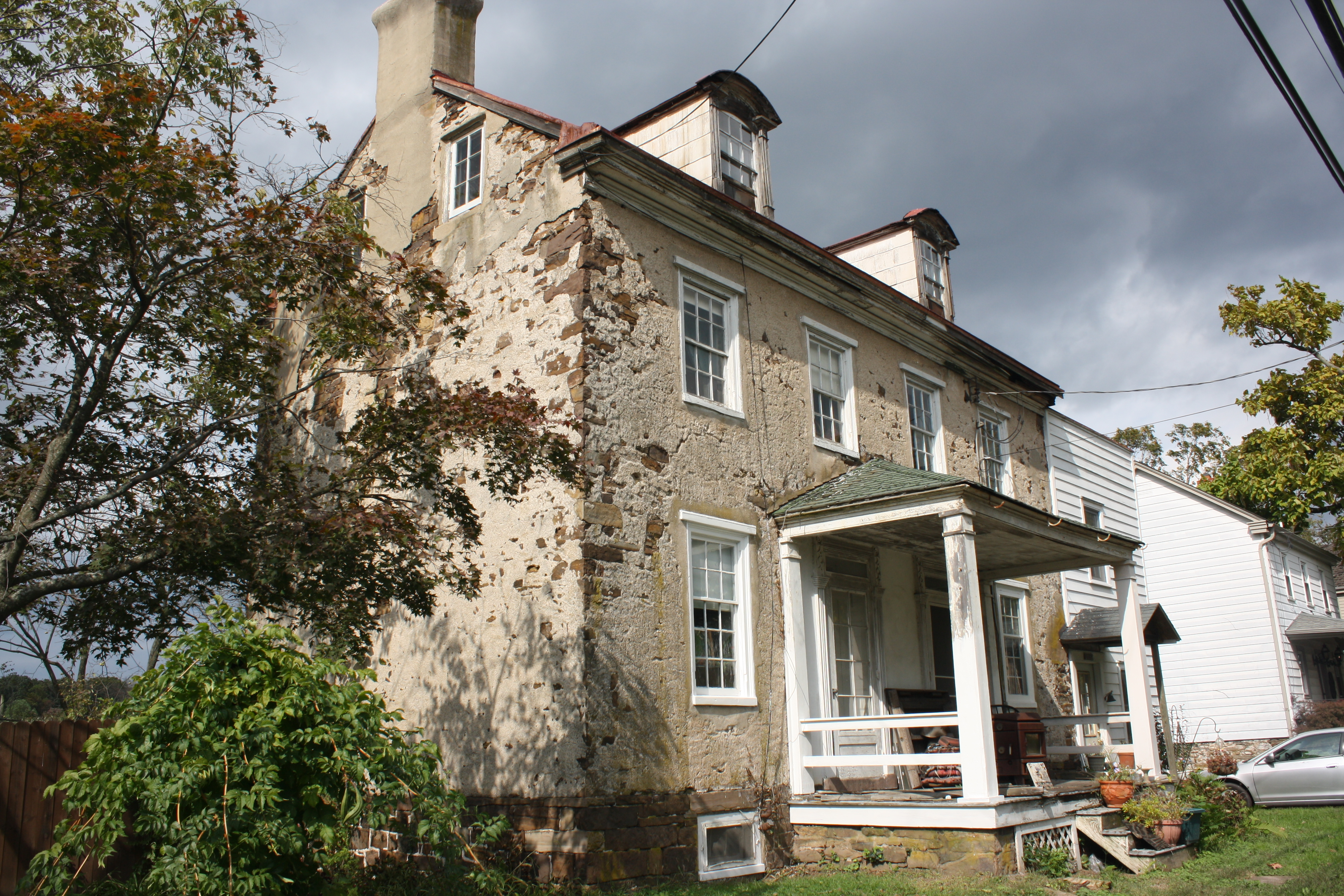
- House in Penns Park Historic District, October 2012

- Location within Pennsylvania Location within the United States
- Location: Intersection of Second St. Pike and Penns Park Rd., Wrightstown Township, Pennsylvania
- Coordinates: 40°15′59″N 74°59′50″W
- Area: 31.5 acres (12.7 ha)
- Architectural style: Greek Revival, Gothic, Queen Anne
- NRHP reference No.: 86000349
- Added to NRHP: March 13, 1986

The Penns Park Historic District is a national historic district that is located in Wrightstown Township, Bucks County, Pennsylvania.

It was added to the National Register of Historic Places in 1986.

== History and architectural features ==
This district includes thirty-four contributing buildings that are located in the village of Phillips Mill. It largely developed during the nineteenth century and is characterized by two-and-one-half-story, gable roofed residences that were designed using vernacular interpretations of various popular architectural styles, including Greek Revival, Gothic, and Queen Anne. A number of the residences have been converted to commercial purposes. Notable buildings include the Methodist church, Penns Park School, and Penns Park Tavern.
