= Paunnacussing Creek =

Paunnacussing Creek Milton's Creek
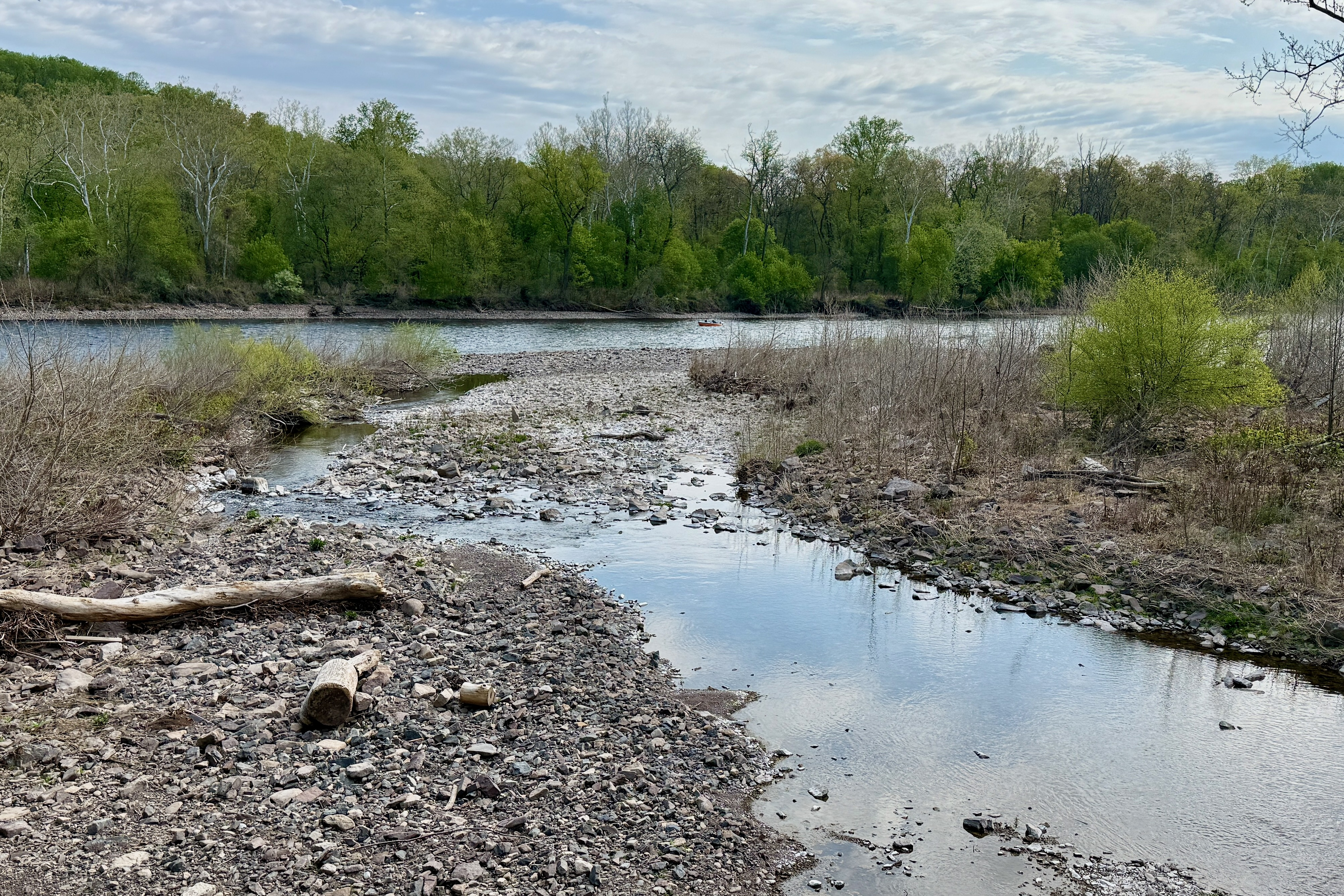
- Confluence with the Delaware River
- Native name: Paunakkus-sing (Unami); Punkus-sing (Unami)

Location
- Country: United States
- State: Pennsylvania
- County: Bucks
- Township: Buckingham; Solebury

Physical characteristics
- Source
  - coordinates: 40°21′12″N 75°4′32″W
  - elevation: 390 feet (120 m)
- Mouth
  - coordinates: 40°24′32″N 75°2′27″W
  - elevation: 72 feet (22 m)
- Length: 5.39 miles (8.67 km)
- Basin size: 7.87 square miles (20.4 km^{2})

Basin features
- Progression: Paunnacussing Creek → Delaware River → Delaware Bay
- River system: Delaware River
- Landmarks: Lumberville
- Bridges: Indian Spring Road; Wellsford Lane; Street Road; Carversville Stone Bridge, Carversville Road; Fleecy Dale Road; Old Carversville Road; Pennsylvania Route 32 (River Road); Delaware Canal aqueduct and towpath
- Slope: 59 feet per mile (11.2 m/km)

National Wild and Scenic Rivers System

Paunnacussing Creek, also spelled Paunacussing and Paunaucussing, is a tributary of the Delaware River contained wholly within Bucks County, Pennsylvania, in the United States. It rises from a pond north of Mechanicsville in Buckingham Township and drains into the Delaware at Bulls Island just upstream of Lumberville in Solebury Township. Notable crossings include the Carversville Stone Bridge and an aqueduct of the Delaware Canal.

== History ==
The original inhabitants of the area of Paunnacussing Creek were the Lenape people. Later, it became a part of the Province of Pennsylvania in 1681. The first mention of the stream was on Cutler's resurvey in 1703. At one time there were several mills along the creek as evidenced by dams along the waterway, which were damaged or destroyed during the great flood of 3 August 1885, which caused severe damage in the village of Carversville, washed out local roads, and destroyed the aqueduct carrying the Delaware Canal over the creek. The cost of replacing the aqueduct was $10,000.

== Statistics ==
The Geographic Name Information System I.D. is 1183392, U.S. Department of the Interior Geological Survey I.D. is 03093. The creek's watershed is 7.87 square miles (20.4 km^{2}), and it meets its confluence with the Delaware river's 155.60 river mile at an elevation of 72 feet (22 m).

== Course ==
Paunnacussing Creek rises from a pond north of Mechanicsville at an elevation of 390 feet (120 m) and starts out northwest oriented, then northeast, turns northwest, and back to northeast. At Carversville, it picks up two unnamed tributaries, one from the right bank, then one from the left. Then is northeast oriented until it passes under the Delaware Canal aqueduct and meets with the Delaware River just upstream of Lumberville across from Bulls Island at an elevation of 72 feet (22 m), resulting in an average slope of 59 feet per mile (11.2 m/km).

== Geology ==
Paunnacussing Creek lies in the Stockton Formation of bedrock consisting of arkosic sandstone, buff to light-gray, and red to purple-red sandstone, shale, siltstone, and mudstone laid down during the Triassic.

== Municipalities ==
- Bucks County
  - Solebury Township
  - Buckingham Township

== Crossings and Bridges ==
Crossing	NBI Number	Length	Lanes	Spans	Material/Design	Built	Reconstructed	Latitude	Longitude
Indian Spring Road	-	-	-	-	-	-	-	-	-
Wellsford Lane	-	-	-	-	-	-	-	-	-
Street Road	-	-	-	-	-	-	-	-	-
Carversville Stone Bridge, Carversville Road	7103	13 metres (43 ft)	2	2	arch-deck masonry	-	2011	40°23'11.1"N	75°3'45.7"W
Fleecy Dale Road	7111	21 metres (69 ft)	2	2	arch-deck masonry	-	-	40°23'15.6"N	75°3'46"W
Old Carversville Road	7545	16 metres (52 ft)	1	1	steel stringer/multi-beam or girder	1931	1986	40°23'34.8"N	75°3'26.2"W
Pennsylvania Route 32 (River Road)	41338	14 metres (46 ft)	2	1	prestressed concrete box beam or girders-multiple	2001	-	40°24'27.8"N	75°2'31.92"W
Delaware Canal Paunnacussing Creek Aqueduct	-	-	-	-	-	-	2025	40°24'30.3"N	75°2'28.7"W

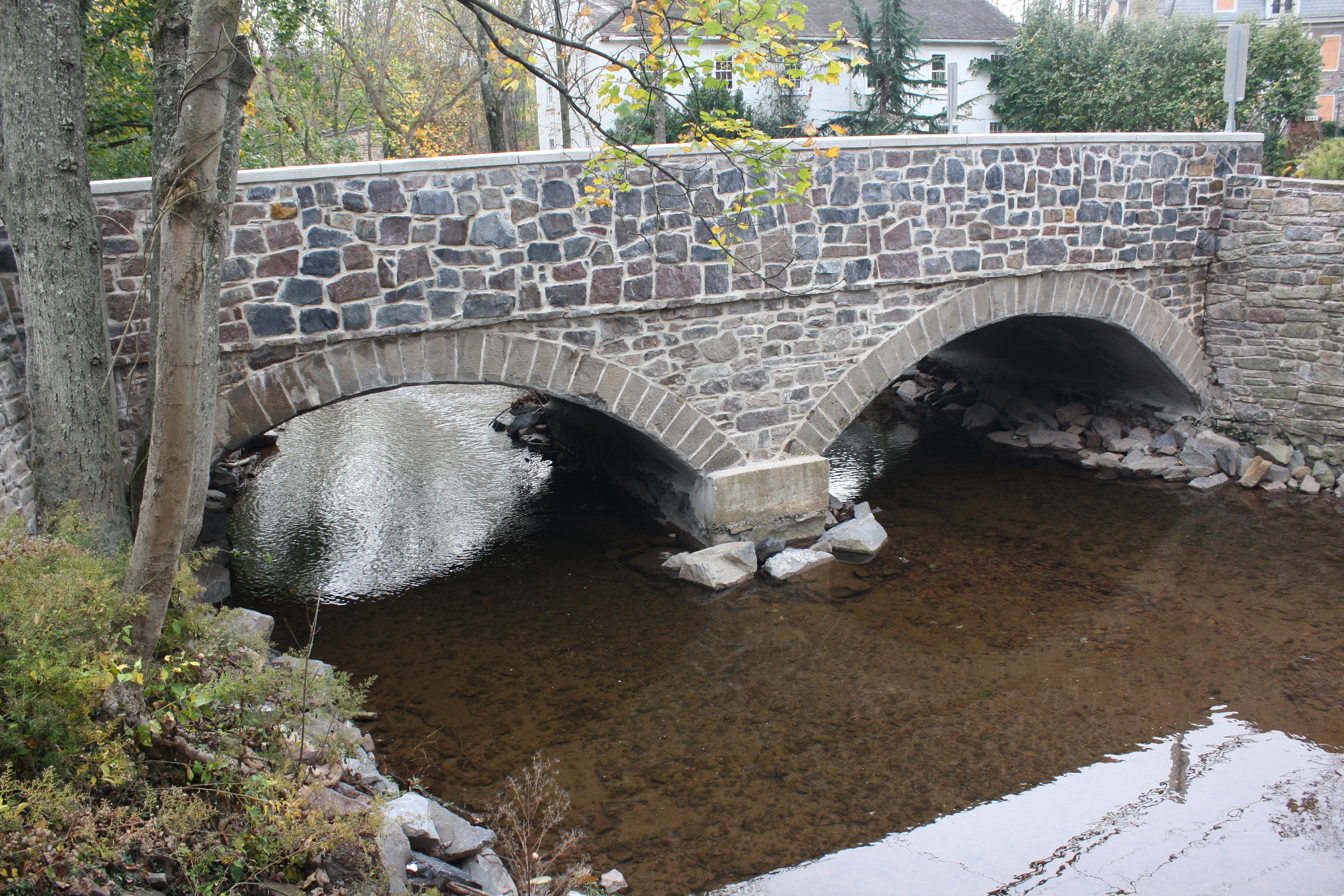
Carversville Stone Bridge

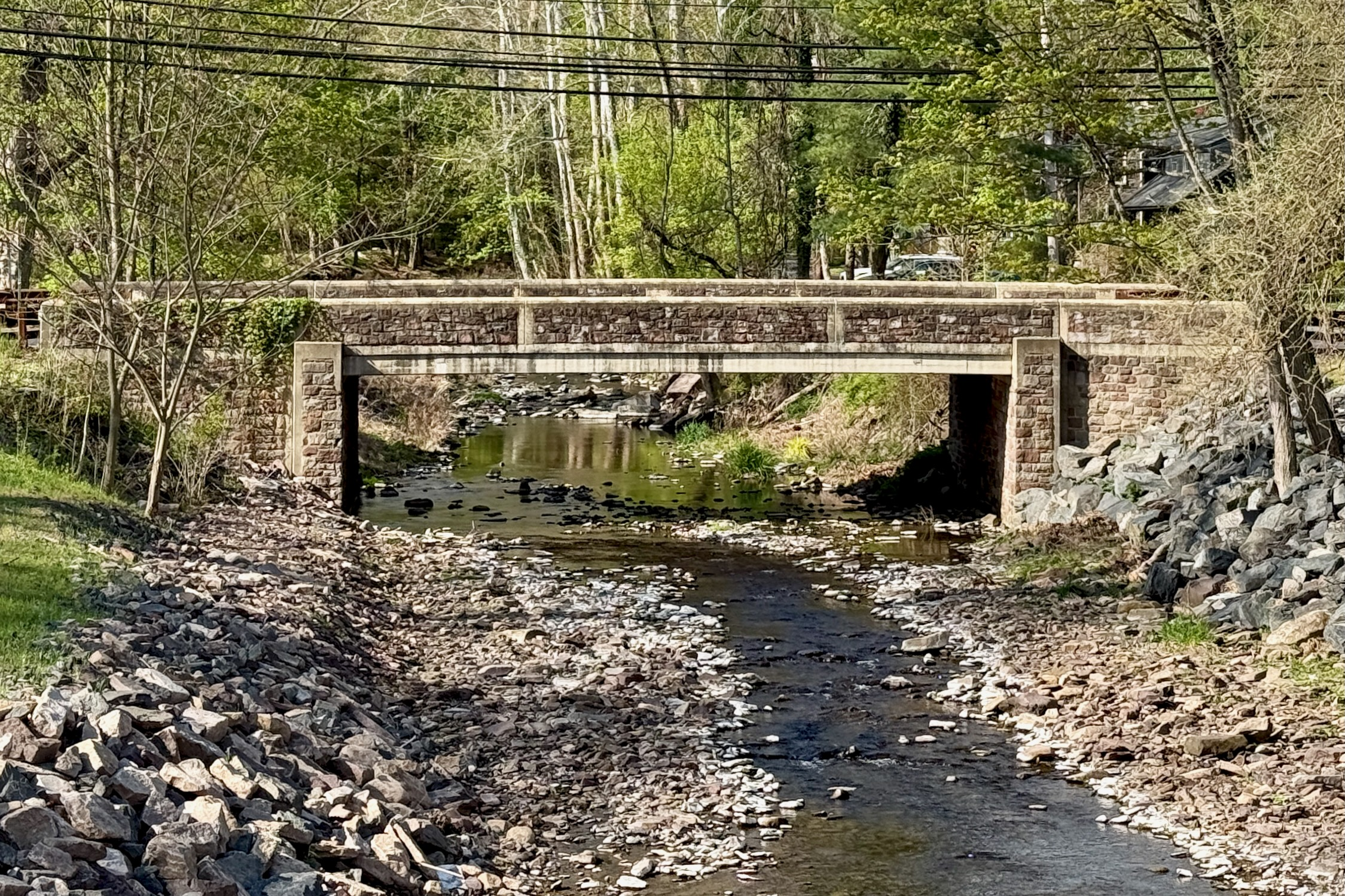
River Road Bridge

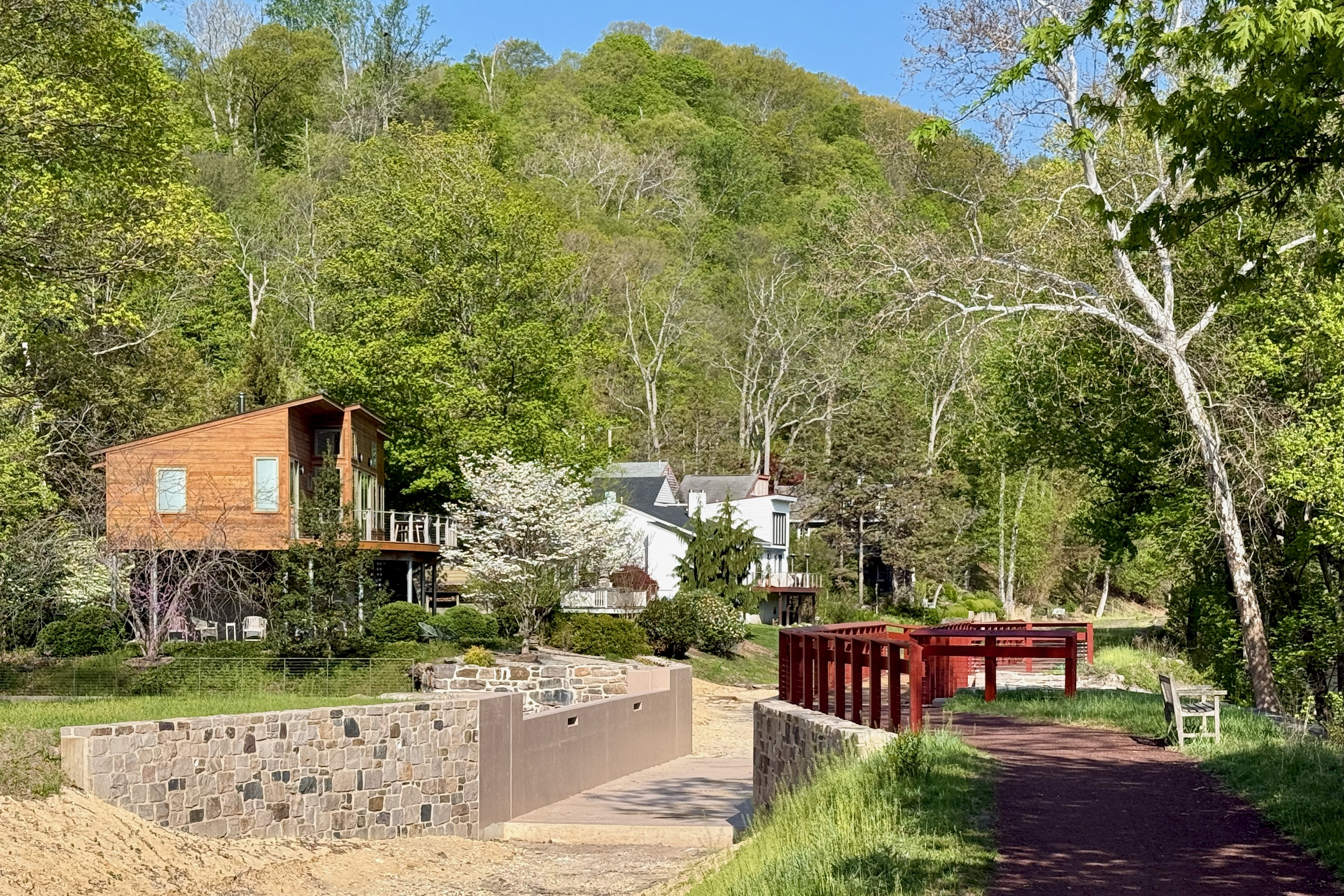
Paunnacussing Creek Aqueduct

== See also ==
- List of rivers of the United States
- List of rivers of Pennsylvania
- List of Delaware River tributaries
