= Lincoln (band) =

American rock band

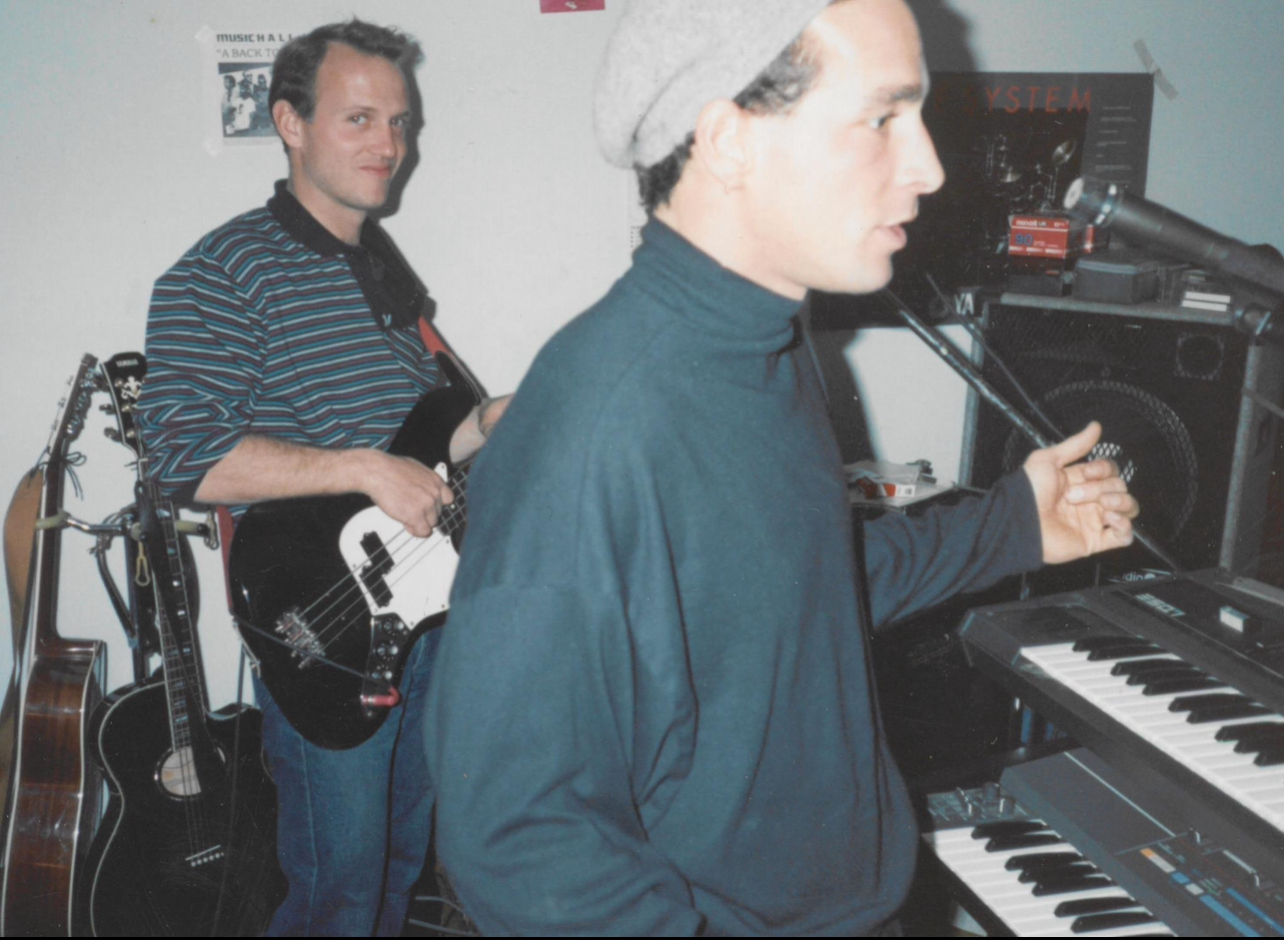
- Lincoln Recordings @ 123

Background information
- Origin: New York, USA
- Genres: Alternative rock
- Years active: 1997–1998
- Labels: Polygram
- Past members: Christopher Temple; Gonzalo Martinez de la Cotera; Danny Weinkauf; Dan Miller

Lincoln was an American alternative rock band consisting of four members: Chris Temple (lead vocals, guitar, keyboards), Gonzalo Martinez de la Cotera (drums), Danny Weinkauf (bass), and Dan Miller (guitar). They were based in New York City. The band broke up in 1998 after releasing only one album, Lincoln.

== History ==
=== Lincoln (self-titled album) (1997) ===
Formed by singer-songwriter Chris Temple, a former and now retired landscaper, the band released their first and only (self-titled) album in 1997. The album was noted to show versatility in songwriting, ranging from alt-pop to country rock to synthpop. The lyrics were often observations of life, ranging from relationships (and their end) in "Stop" and "Wish You Were Dead" via hedonistic car driving in "Sucker", drug habits in "Straight", the burden of keeping up appearances in "Unhappy" to an anti-anthem for Temple's hometown Carversville, Pennsylvania in "Carversville". The album got positive reviews, both from critics and fans. Gary Graff of the San Francisco Chronicle wrote that the album put Lincoln on a short list of "quirky pop groups that know how to wrap their irreverence in irresistible songs." The Patriot Ledger's critic wrote that "Lincoln explores the same nerdy pop domain as their mentors, They Might Be Giants, with clever lyrics and slightly skewed rock." In a positive review, Entertainment Weekly compared the band's songs to "long-lost '70s Top 40 hits."

=== Tours ===
On tours, Lincoln opened for They Might Be Giants, Susanna Hoffs and Marcy Playground. (Although they toured together, Lincoln did not take its name from They Might Be Giants' album Lincoln.) In a review of one of the performances, the Milwaukee Journal Sentinel wrote that Lincoln "specializes more in charisma and less in invention: While lead singer Chris Temple is endearing, his band's music is mostly guitar-oriented pop. It's mostly harmless but quite memorable."

=== Breakup ===
While touring with Marcy Playground in the fall of 1998, guitarist Miller left the band. They played at least one concert (in Atlanta) with only the three remaining members, but then the band broke up. Dan Miller and Danny Weinkauf went on to join They Might Be Giants. Gonzalo "Gonz" Martinez de la Cotera became drummer of Marcy Playground, replacing Dan Rieser, but left the band before their 2009 tour. Chris Temple went on to pursue his solo career, as he also contributed a song for the film Welcome to the Dollhouse.

=== Discography ===
==== Albums ====
- Lincoln (Island Def Jam, 1997)

==== Singles ====
- "Blow" (1997)
- "Stop" (1997)

==== Misc. ====
- Lincoln (Sampler) (1997)

== Touring partners ==
- They Might Be Giants (1997)
- Marcy Playground (1998)
