= Carversville, Pennsylvania =

Unincorporated community in Pennsylvania, US

- Unincorporated community
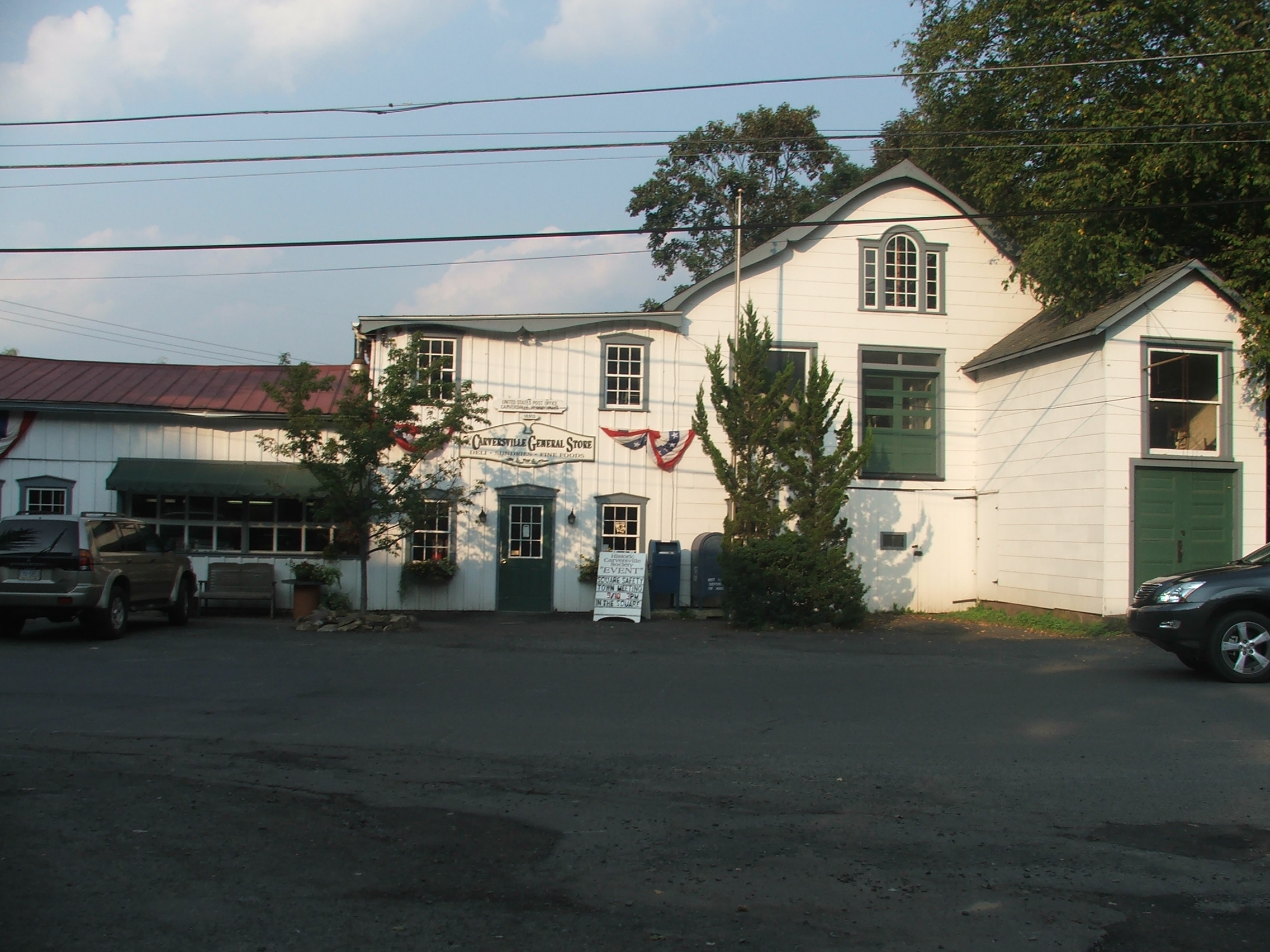
- Carversville Town Square

- Location within Pennsylvania
- Coordinates: 40°23′11″N 75°03′46″W
- Country: United States
- State: Pennsylvania
- County: Bucks
- Township: Solebury
- Elevation: 226 ft (69 m)
- Time zone: UTC-5 (Eastern (EST))
  - Summer (DST): UTC-4 (EDT)
- ZIP code: 18913
- Area codes: 215, 267 and 445
- GNIS feature ID: 1203228

Carversville is an unincorporated community and geographically isolated area in Solebury Township, Bucks County, Pennsylvania, United States, approximately 45 miles north of Philadelphia. It was originally a Lenape gathering place called Aquetong (translation: "many springs") more than 300 years ago the area's land was granted to James Harrison and Joseph Pike by William Penn. The Paunacussing Creek, also called Fleecydale, runs through Carversville and meets the Delaware River at Lumberville.

By 1730, roads had been formed into Carversville's dense forests so that settlers could haul out wool and farm produce and bring in lumber that had been rafted down the Delaware River from northern Pennsylvania.

Carversville was originally called Indian Village, though was later named Mill Town for the presence of its mills. Its name was later contracted into Milton before finally, in 1833, being renamed Carversville in honor of the first postmaster, whose last name was Carver.

Carversville was a center of commerce from its inception, and boasted enterprises such as Stovers Mill, Fretz Mill, Carver Mill, Suggin Bag Manufactury, a sash and blind mill, and the famous Roram Hat factory.

In 1859, the Excelsior Normal Institute was founded on the hill that overlooks the village. This five-story stone building became a well-known school which turned out scholars until it fell on hard times in the late nineteenth century. When teaching ended, pleasure began as the building became a resort. However, its lifespan was also short-lived. The final use for the property was as the Carversville Christian Orphanage. The building was razed in the mid-1900s.

Today, Carversville is home to some 100 residents, and is protected by a Historic District Ordinance which prevents the area from being marred by overdevelopment of new homes and businesses.

The center of Carversville, nicknamed the Town Square, is home to the Carversville Inn, a restaurant which dates back to 1813, the dental office of Dr. Howard Barsky, and the Carversville General Store. The Historic Carversville Society maintains an active schedule full of events for its residents, which includes Carversville Day (a town fair that includes the famed "pet parade"), Films in the Field (old movies shown once a month during the summer, projected on the side of the general store), and Carolling in the Square (where villagers gather in the square to sing Christmas carols and visit Santa Claus).

The Carversville Stone Bridge and Carversville Historic District are listed on the National Register of Historic Places.

== In popular culture ==
Carversville was home to noted artist Charles Hargens, famous for his cover art. Hargens painted covers for The Saturday Evening Post, Collier's, The Open Road for Boys, and many western novels of the 1930s and 1940s.

"Carversville" is the title of a song by the band Lincoln. During a concert in 1998, the band said that it was specifically about Carversville, Pennsylvania.
