= Carversville Historic District =

Historic district in Pennsylvania, United States

- U.S. National Register of Historic Places
- U.S. Historic district
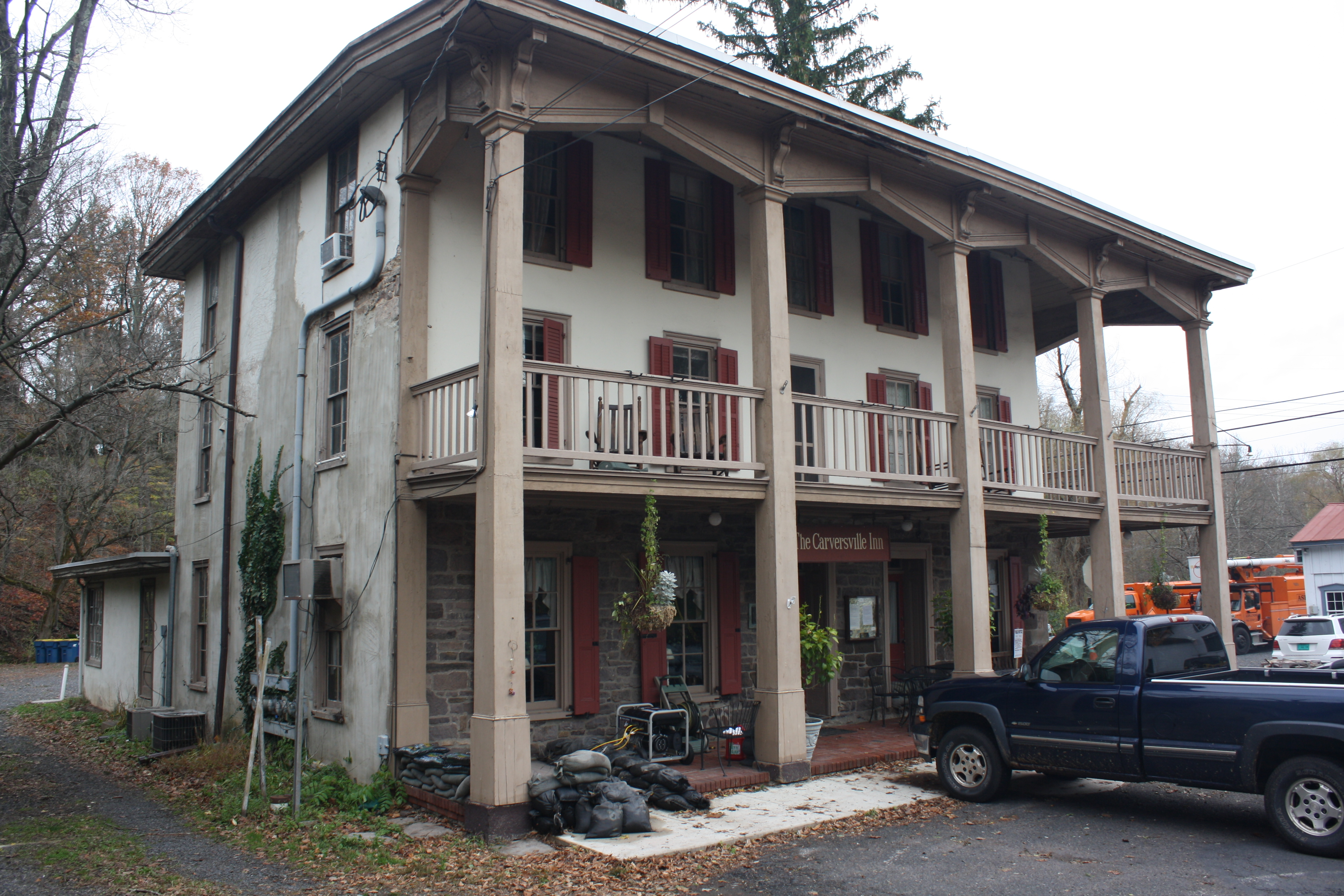
- Carversville Inn. November 2012.

- Location within Pennsylvania Location within the United States
- Location: Off PA 32, Carversville, Pennsylvania
- Coordinates: 40°23′09″N 75°03′35″W
- Area: 188 acres (76 ha)
- Architect: Multiple
- Architectural style: Colonial, Late Victorian, Federal
- NRHP reference No.: 78003418
- Added to NRHP: December 13, 1978

Carversville Historic District is a national historic district located at Carversville, Solebury Township, Bucks County, Pennsylvania. The district includes 57 contributing buildings in the village of Carversville. The buildings include notable examples of the Late Victorian and Federal styles. Notable buildings are the Overpeck Homestead (c. 1703-1716), Fred Clark Art Museum (1873), and Carversville Christian Church (1866).

It was added to the National Register of Historic Places in 1978.

== Gallery ==
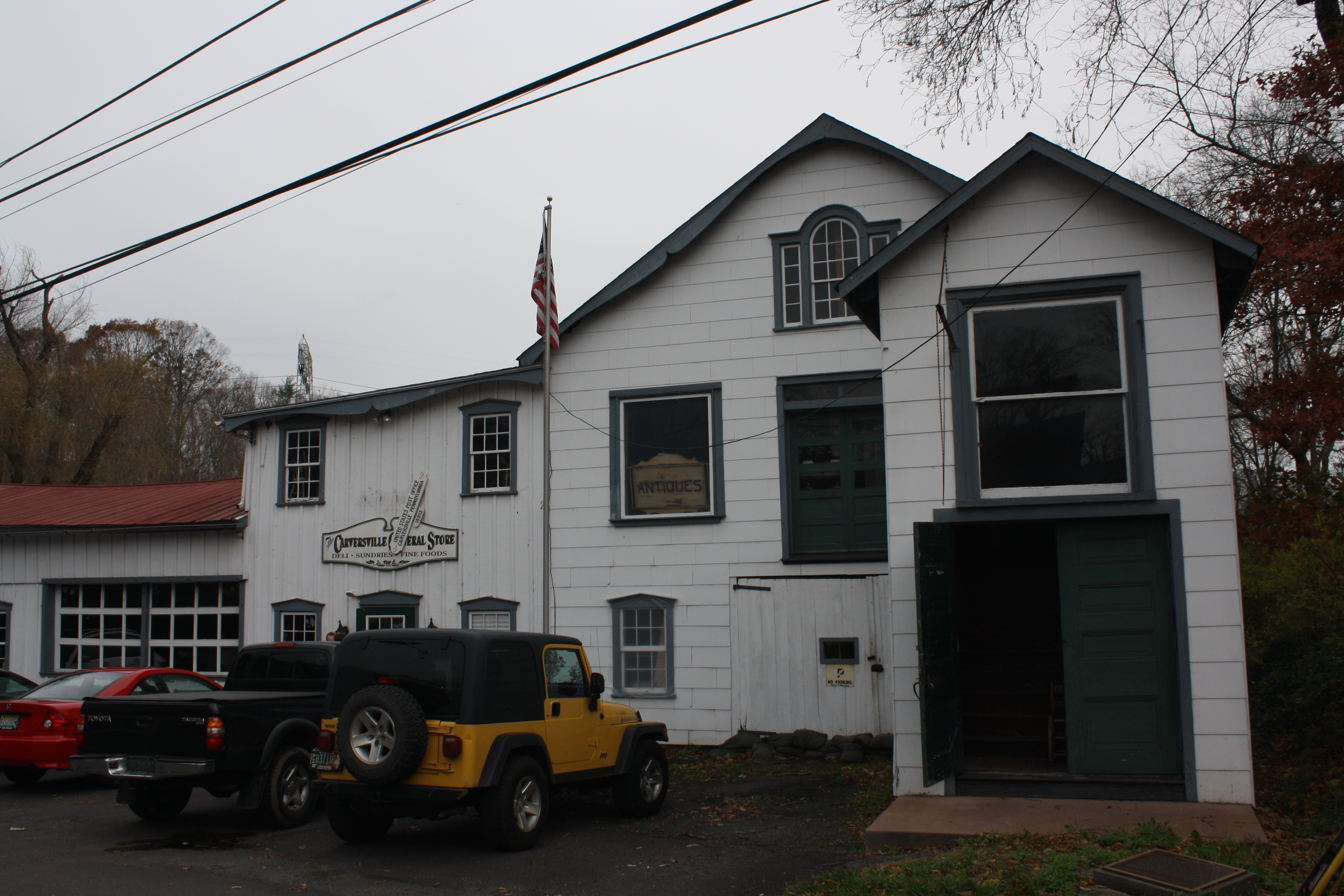
Carversville General Store and Post Office.

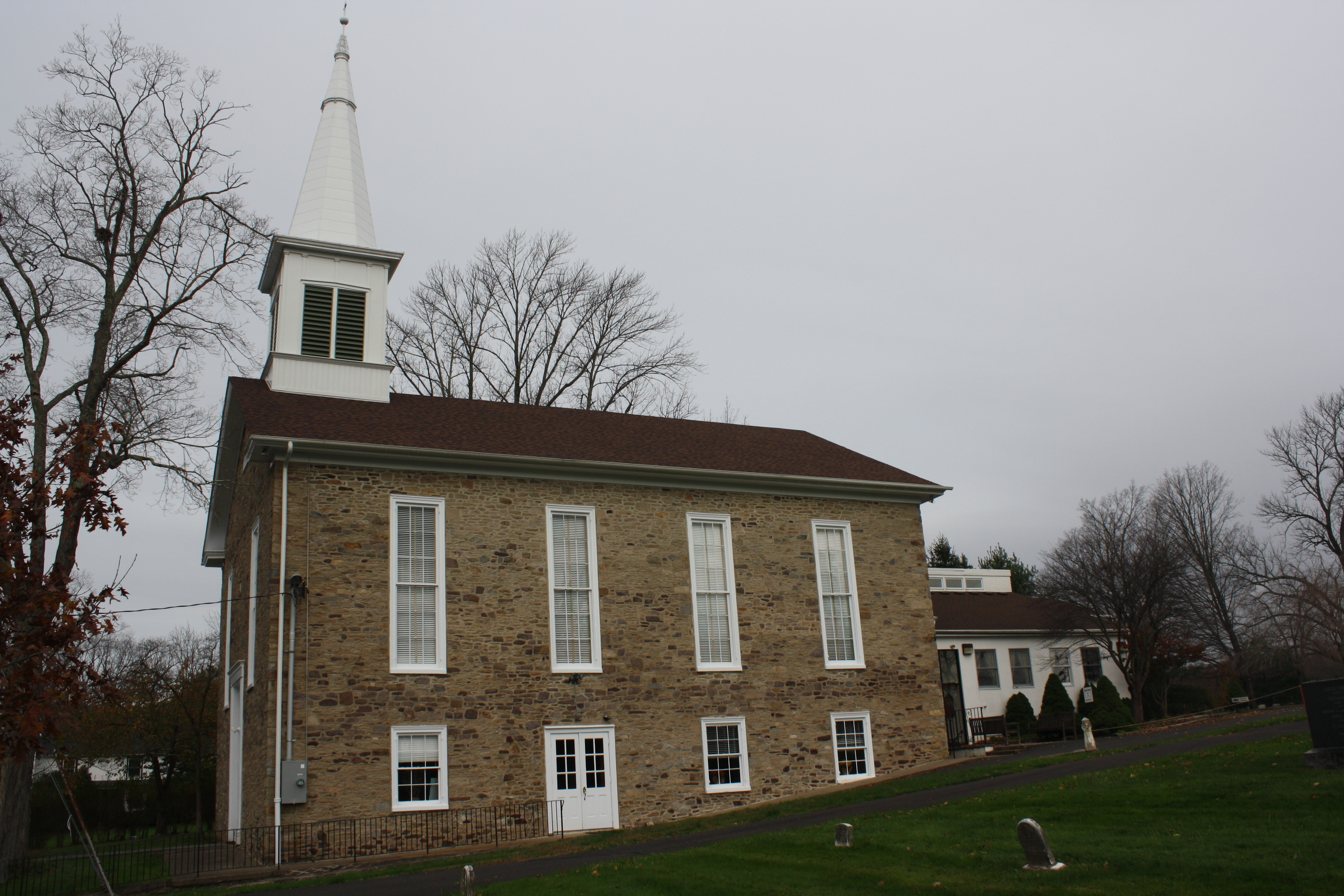
Carversville Christian Church.

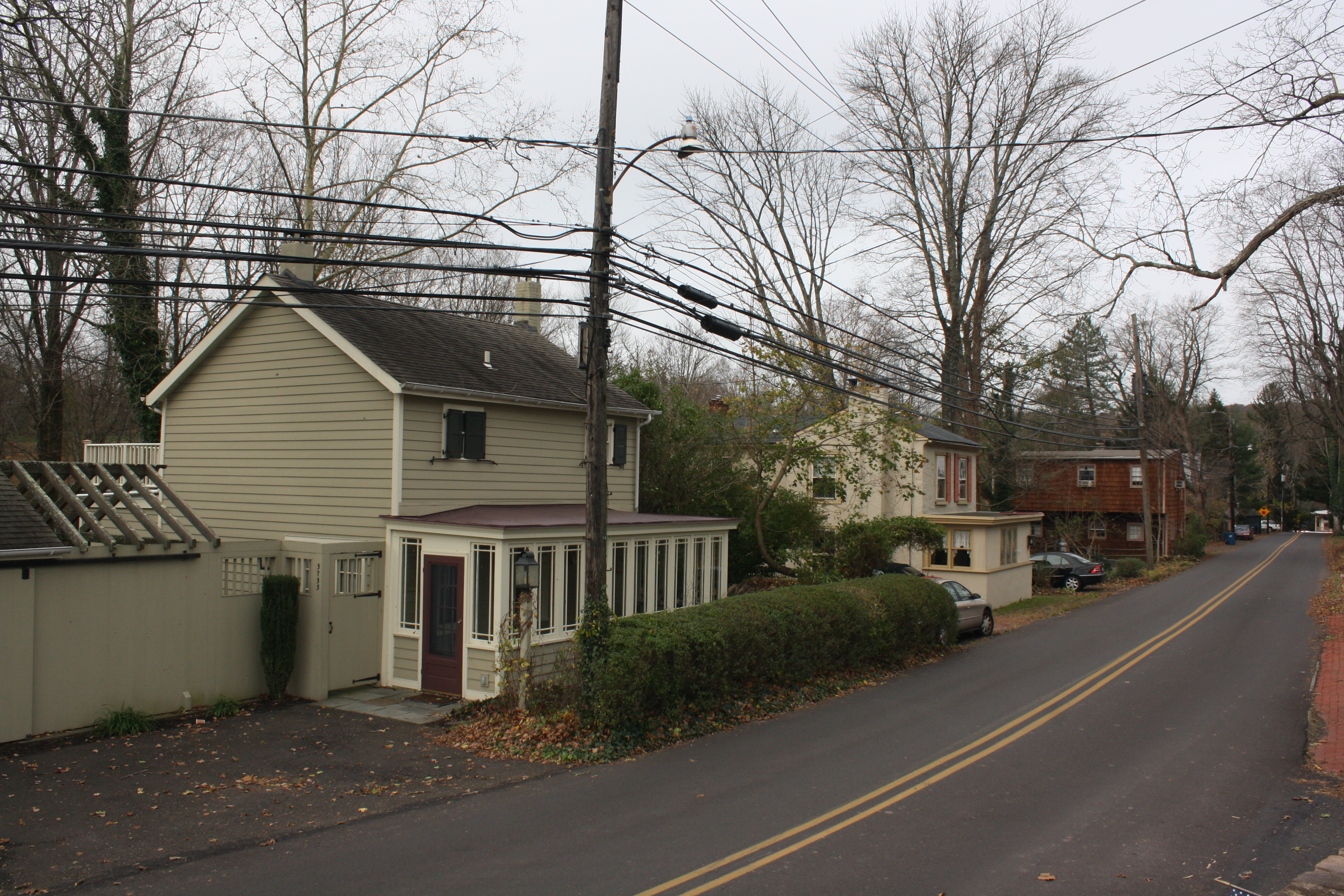
Aquetong Road.

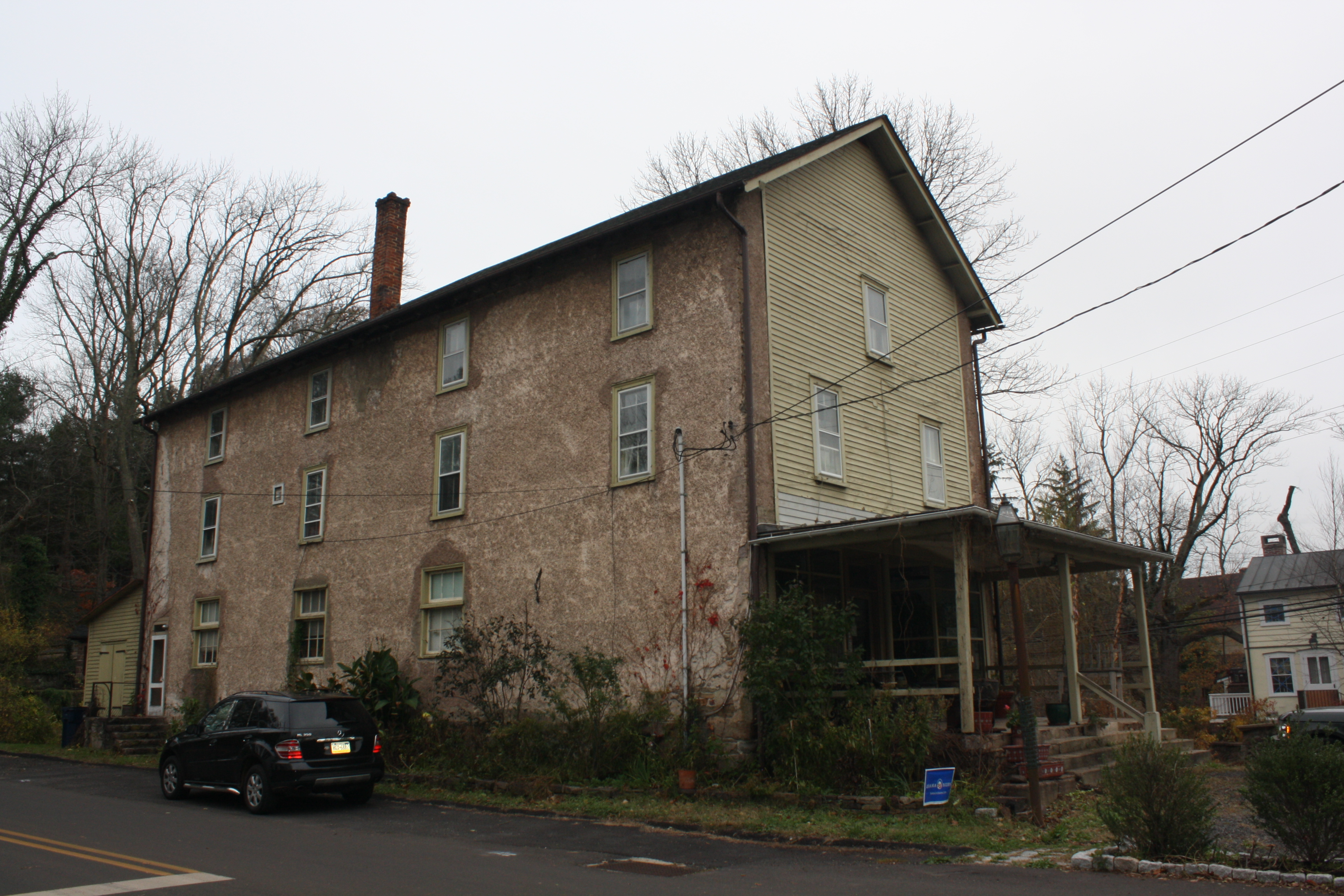
Corner of Carversville Rd. and Wismer Rd.

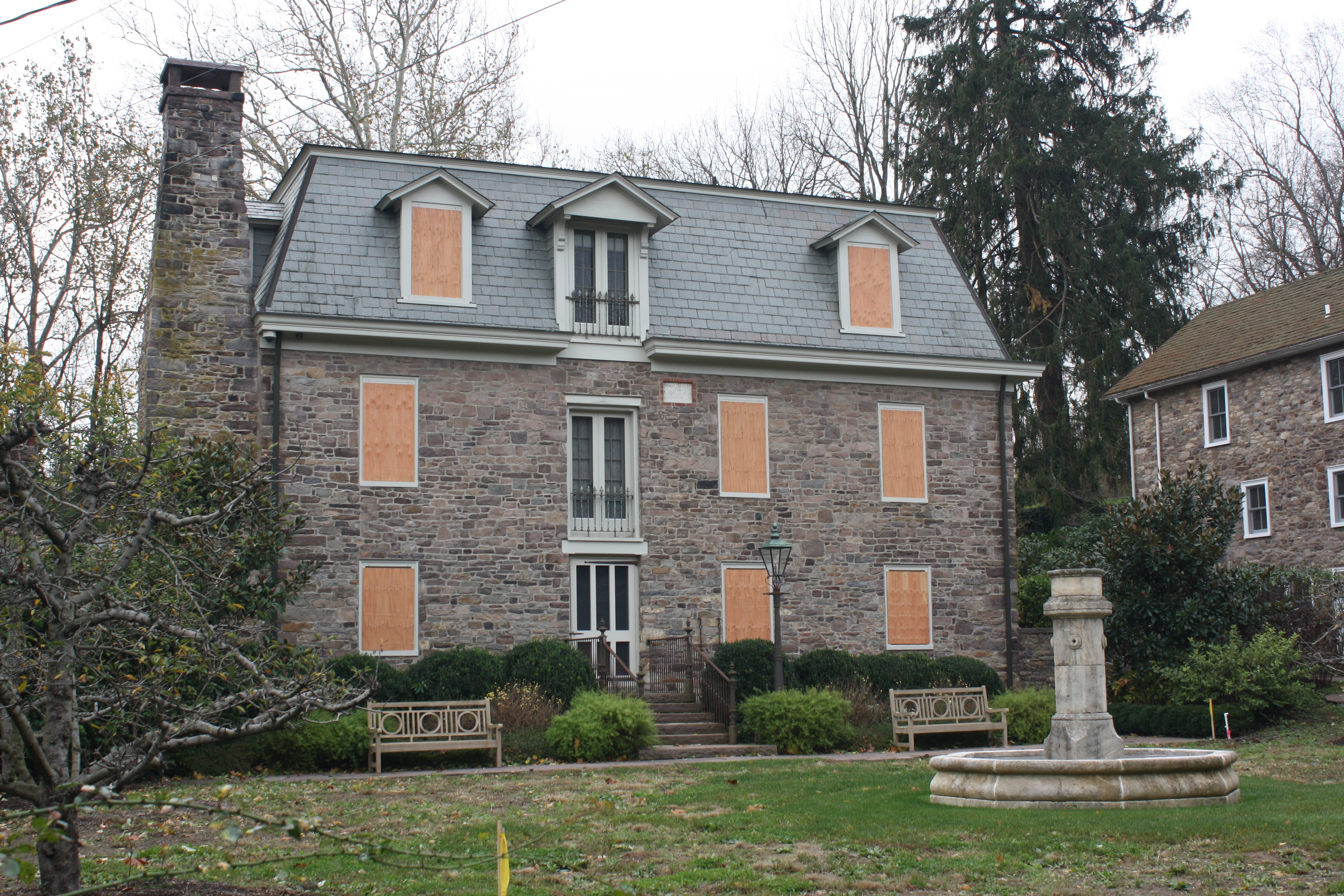
Carversville Rd.

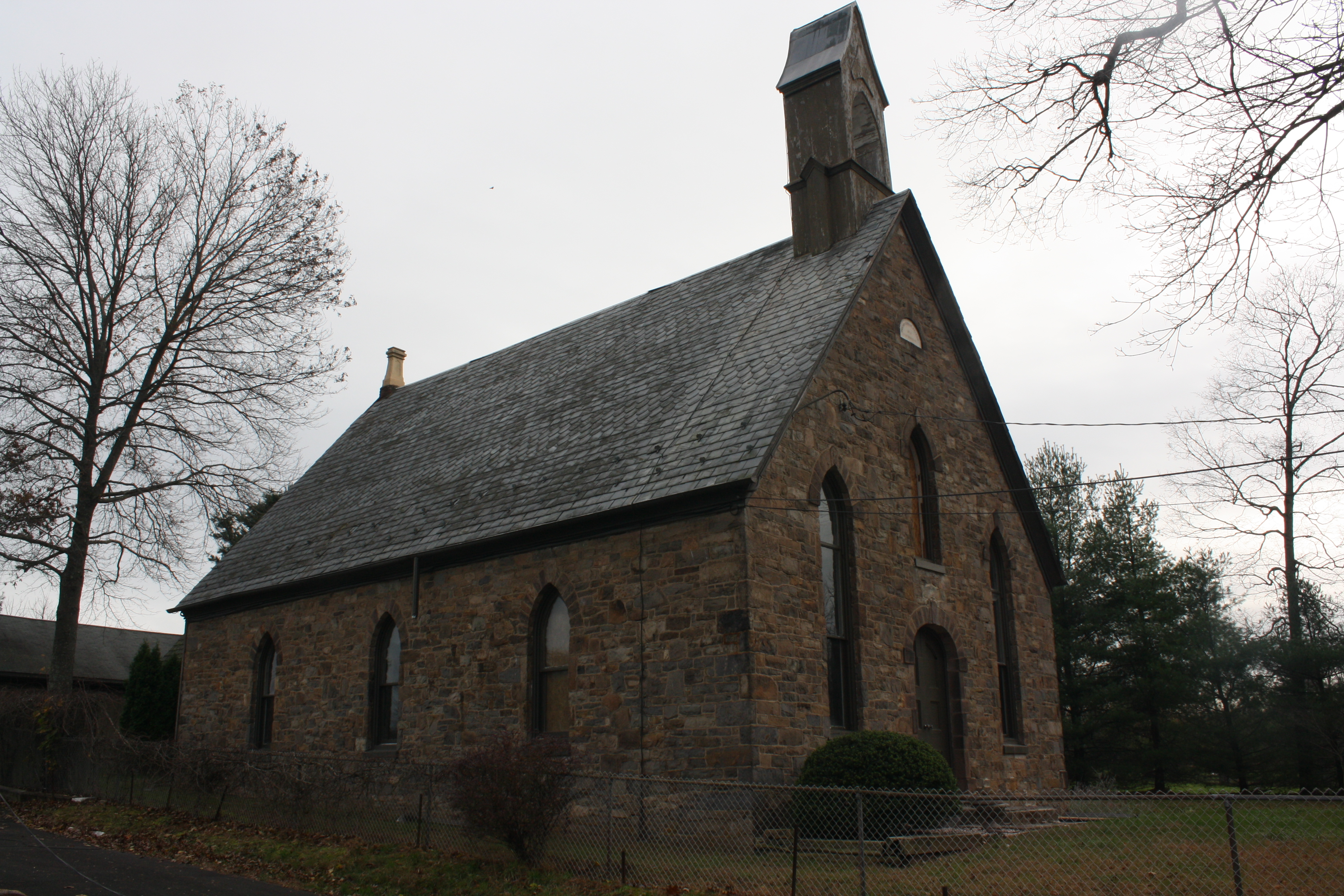
Fred Clark Art Museum.
