= Carversville Stone Bridge =

- U.S. National Register of Historic Places
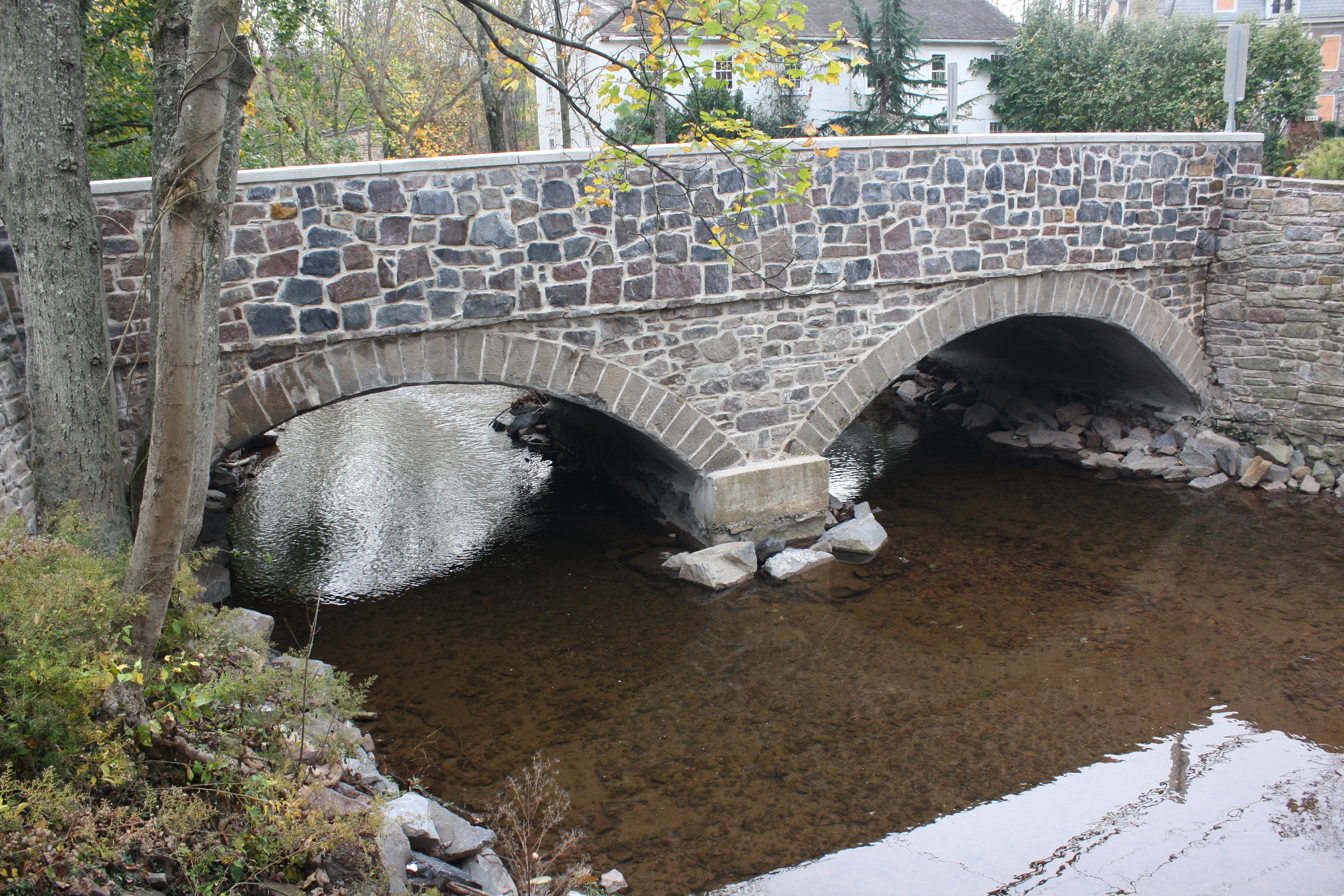
- Carversville Stone Bridge, west side. November 2012.

- Location within Pennsylvania Location within the United States
- Location: Carversville Road over Paunacussing Creek, Carversville, Pennsylvania
- Coordinates: 40°23′9″N 75°3′50″W
- Area: less than one acre
- Built: 1854
- Architectural style: Multiple span stone arch
- MPS: Highway Bridges Owned by the Commonwealth of Pennsylvania, Department of Transportation TR
- NRHP reference No.: 88000783
- Added to NRHP: June 22, 1988

The Carversville Stone Bridge, also known as the Bridge in Solebury Township on some documents, is an historic stone arch bridge crossing Paunnacussing Creek at Carversville in Solebury Township, Pennsylvania, United States. It has two spans, each 20 feet long, and was constructed in 1854. It is constructed of roughly squared stone.

It was listed on the National Register of Historic Places in 1988.

== Gallery ==
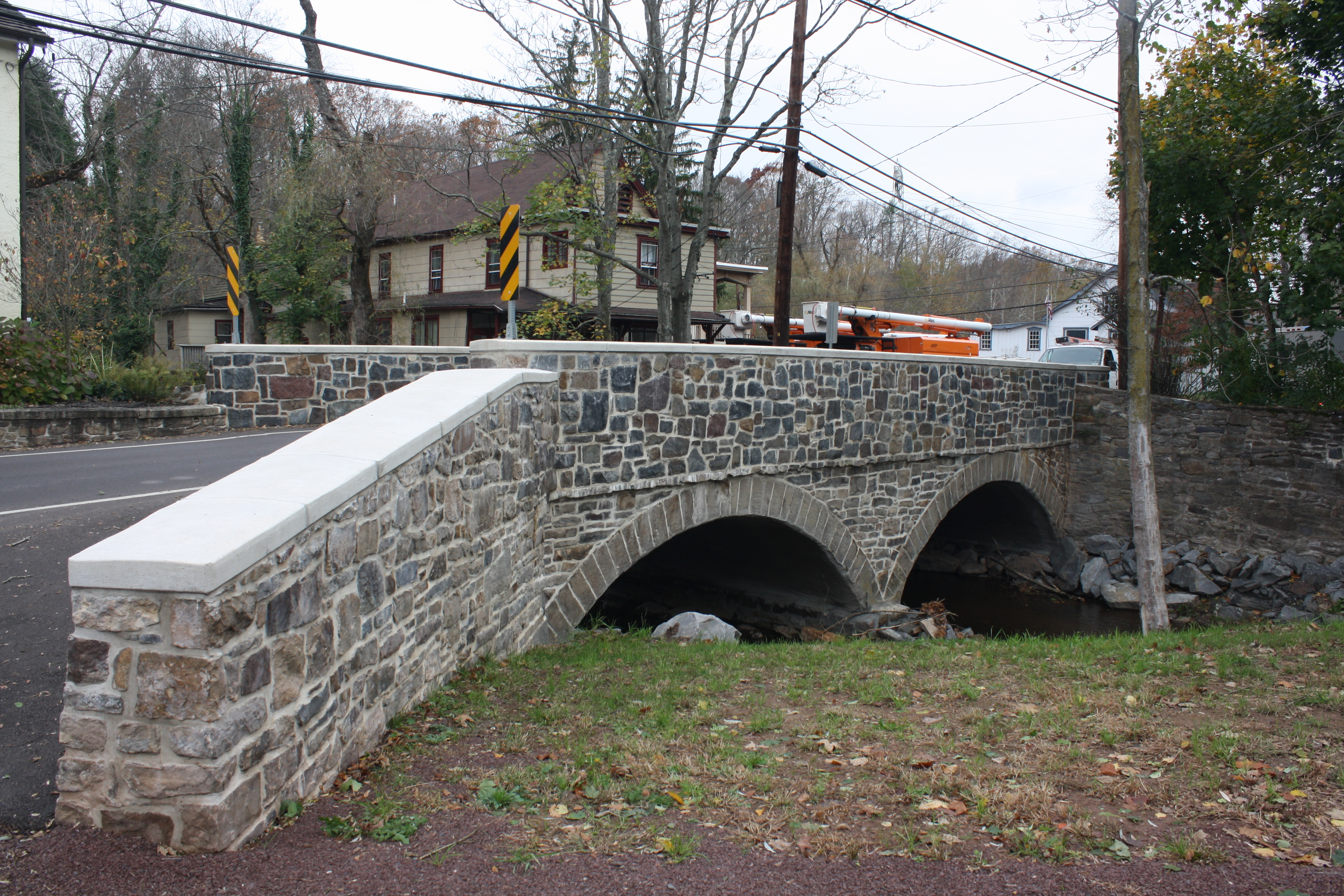
East side

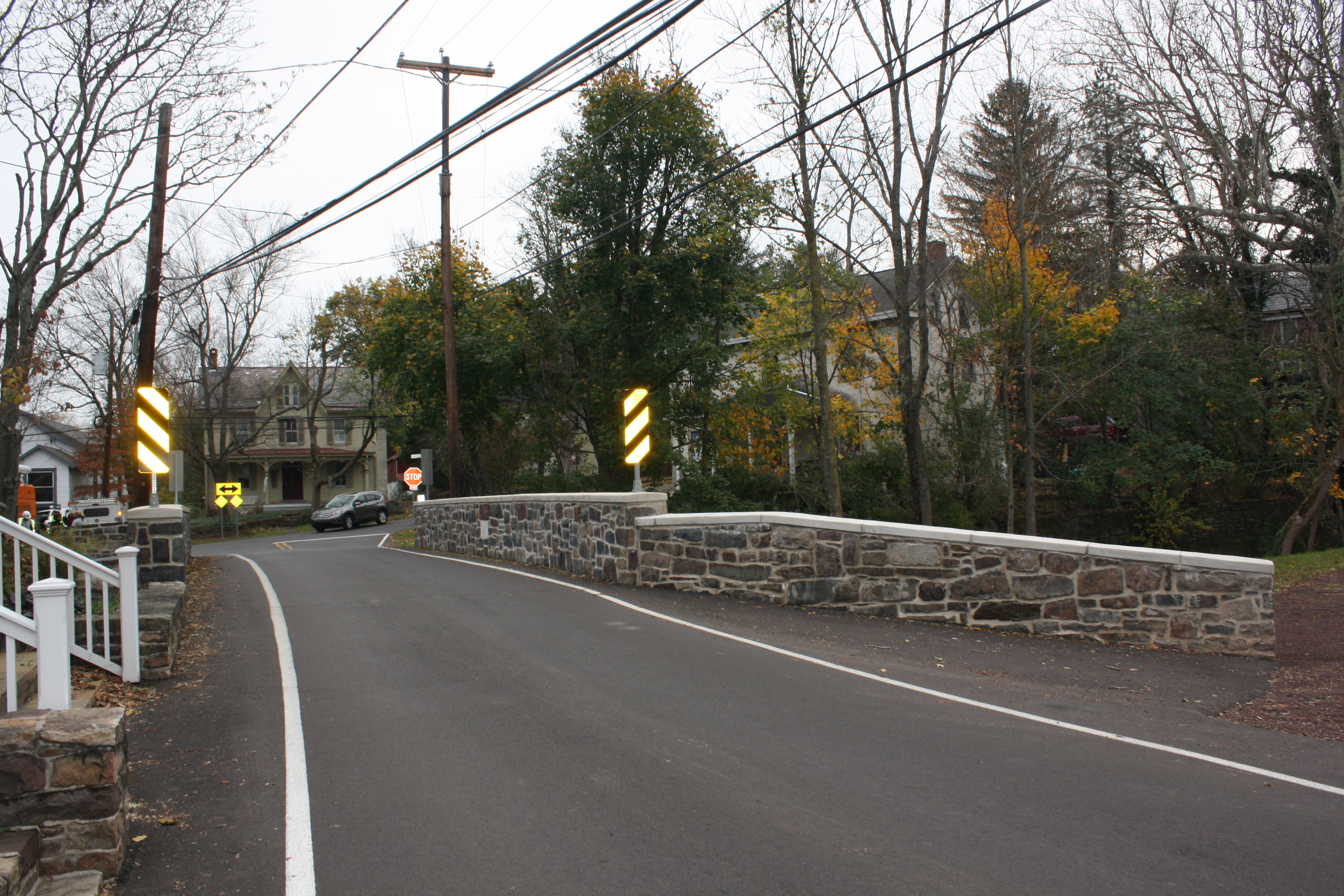
Bridge and Carversville Rd., view from south
