= Charles Hargens =

American painter

Charles William Hargens Jr. (1893−1997) was an American painter. He created over 3000 covers for magazines such as The Saturday Evening Post, Collier's, Country Gentleman, Farm Journal, Boys' Life, The Open Road for Boys, along with advertisements for companies such as Coca-Cola and covers for over 300 books, including the Zane Grey Western novels of the 1930s and 1940s.

He worked for over 80 years and died on January 30, 1997, at 103 years of age. He is buried at Glenside Cemetery in Montgomery County Pennsylvania.

== Early life ==
Hargens was born in Hot Springs, South Dakota, the son of a country doctor. When he was 6 years old he was making charcoal drawings of houses and barns. People took notice of his work and started paying him for his pieces; if they could tell what he was drawing they would pay him 25 cents for it. When he was eight years old his parents separated. He was 10 when he moved with his mother back to Omaha and Council Bluffs area. He would spend the summers with his father in Hot Springs and traveling with him to Chicago where he would spend his days at the Art Institute while his father conducted business. Back in Council Bluffs during the winter months, he began to take art classes in high school and worked in the studio of a portrait painter. As a teenager he belonged to a group led by Ernest Thompson Seton that was a forerunner to the Boy Scouts program.

== Later life and work ==
Hargens studied art at the Pennsylvania Academy of the Fine Arts. When he first arrived the first instructor he met was Daniel Garber. Barber recognized the talent Hargens showed. He invited Hargens, as was his custom with students, to come to his home in Lumberville to paint with him on the weekends. Charles Hargens was the recipient of the Cresson Scholoarship to study in Paris. While in Paris he enrolled in the Carolossi and Julian Academy. He traveled Europe visiting the great museums.

After he returned to the United States he settled in Philadelphia and his career started to take off. Artists and publishers would specifically request him because of his attention to detail. He worked on book jackets, magazine illustrations and advertisements for the likes of Stetson Hat Company and Coca-Cola. Some of the magazines that he did illustrations for were The Saturday Evening Post, Collier's, McClure's, Liberty, Gentleman's Quarterly, Boys Life. In addition he designed posters for 10 years for the National Multiple Sclerosis Society. He distinguished himself with his western illustrations that painstakingly detailed life in the west. He was a stickler for accuracy and detail in his painting and drawing. His studio is filled with volumes of books he used to research his subjects and reference photos he took in order to get the level of detail and accuracy he desired in his work.

In 1917 he married Marjorie Garman, a fashion illustrator for ladies magazines. They had a son, Charles William Hargens, III. In 1940 they moved to Carversville, Solebury Township, Bucks County, Pennsylvania. They would commute to Philadelphia each day to their respective studios. Each summer the Hargens family traveled back to South Dakota, where he painted and photographed the "west" as he saw it. After a few years Charles Hargens set up his studio in Carversville and stopped the daily commute.

In 1941 he donated some of the first pieces of art to the Friends of the Middle Border, Inc. who later became the Dakota Discovery Museum. Some of the pieces he donated were Snowy Evening at Buffalo Gap, The Woodcutters, and The Plowman. When he died in 1997 his family honored his wish that his Carversville art studio, and many of his Western works, be donated to the Dakota Discovery Museum where it can be seen today. His signature changed throughout his career which can be seen at The Dakota Discovery Museum in Mitchell, South Dakota with one of his more memorable form of his signature containing a highly stylized 'g'.

He was recruited in 1947 to act as scoutmaster to Troop 64, a scout troop in Carversville, which he participated in until 1980.

== Honors and awards ==
- 1981 Community Service Award for Excellence in Art from the Central Bucks Chamber of Commerce, Doylestown, PA
- 1982 Honorary Doctor of Fine Arts degree from Dakota Wesleyan University, Mitchell, SD
- 1993 The James A. Michener Art Museum honored Hargens with a special exhibition of his work to celebrate his 100th birthday.

== Exhibitions ==
=== Major solo exhibitions ===
- Rodman House, Doylestown, PA, 1983
- Pennswood Art Gallery, Newtown, PA, February, 1984
- Upstairs Gallery, Lahaska, PA, 1990, 1991
- Celebrate 100th, Charles Hargens, James A. Michener Art Museum, Doylestown, PA, 1993

=== Major group exhibitions ===
- Bucks Fever '86, Artists' Studio Tour, Doylestown, PA, 1986
- Three Bucks County Masters (Bucks Fever '89), Central Bucks Chamber of Commerce, Doylestown, PA, 1989
- Charles Hargens: American Illustrator, James A. Michener Art Museum, New Hope, PA, 2007–08
- An Evolving Legacy: Twenty Years of Collecting at the James A. Michener Art Museum, Doylestown, PA, 2009 - 2010

== Collections ==
Hargens' work is held in the following collections:

- Whitney Museum, Cody, Wyoming
- Sons of the Middle Border, Museum and Gallery, Mitchell, SD
- National Museum of American Illustration, Newport, RI
- Carversville Christian Church, UCC, Carversville, PA (his only two religious pieces)

== Commissions ==
- Two large murals for the Bucks County (PA) Council Boy Scouts
