= The Open Road for Boys =

Boys' magazine in publication from November 1919 to the 1950s

The Open Road for Boys, a boys' magazine encouraging the outdoor life, was published from November 1919 to the 1950s. The magazine was a monthly for the first 20 years and then switched to a schedule of ten issues a year. It began as The Open Road, which expanded to The Open Road for Boys in October 1925. Over two decades later, the title changed to Open Road: The Young People's Magazine in April 1950. During its final year, the title changed to American Boy and Open Road with the July 1953 issue.

Clayton Holt Ernst was editor-in-chief of The Open Road. It was originally published by The Torbell Company, 248 Boylston St. in Boston, Massachusetts. The founding officers were Ormond E. Loomis, President, Clayton H. Ernst, Vice-President, and Wm. C. Blackett, Treasurer. They derived the company name from the initials of the magazine and their own last names: T[he]O[pen]R[oad]B[lackett]E[rnst]L[oomis]L[td].

By 1940, the circulation had climbed to 301,000. Beginning in 1944, the art director was Jack Murray (1889-1965), who was also the art director of Outdoors, Child Life and Salt Water Sportsman.

== Contributors ==
Contributors included Ellis Parker Butler, Jonathan Eldridge, Edward C. Janes, Kenneth Payson Kempton and Charles G. Muller, Alpheus Hyatt Verrill and Kerry Wood. Some authors, such as Albert Capwell Wyckoff, wrote for both Boys' Life and The Open Road for Boys. In addition to adventure fiction, there were many articles and ads about the construction of model airplanes. The appeal of Open Road for Boys and the magazine's advertising, specifically an ad for the Red Ryder air rifle, was captured by Jean Shepherd in his short story, "Duel in the Snow, or Red Ryder Nails the Cleveland Street Kid." This story was collected in In God We Trust, All Others Pay Cash, source of the film classic A Christmas Story (1983):

I remember clearly, itchingly, nervously, maddeningly the first time I laid eyes on it, pictured in a three-color, smeared illustration in a full-page back cover ad in Open Road For Boys, a publication which at the time had an iron grip on my aesthetic sensibilities, and the dime that I had to scratch up every month to stay with it. It was actually an early Playboy. It sold dreams, fantasies, incredible adventures, and a way of life. Its center foldouts consisted of gigantic Kodiak bears charging out of the page at the reader, to be gunned down in single hand-to-hand combat by the eleven-year-old Killers armed only with hunting knife and fantastic bravery. Its Christmas issue weighed over seven pounds, its pages crammed with the effluvia of the Good Life of male Juvenalia, until the senses reeled and Avariciousness, the growing desire to own Everything, was almost unbearable. Today there must be millions of ex-subscribers who still can't pass Abercrombie & Fitch without a faint, keening note of desire and the unrequited urge to glom on to all of it. Just to have it, to feel it.

== Cartoon contest ==
A popular Open Road feature was a cartoon contest which showed a drawing of a problem or situation, inviting the magazine's readers to do a follow-up cartoon showing the resolution of the problem. Well known cartoonists, such as Paul Coker, George Crenshaw, Dan Heilman, Eldon Pletcher, Mort Walker, Bill Yates and Bob Zschiesche, saw their first printed cartoons in the Open Road competitions, which also had an influence on illustrators and fine artists, as the painter Wayne Thiebaud noted in an interview with Susan Larsen:

I got very interested in cartooning... mostly just the American comics in the newspapers. For a long time, I remember I cut out strips and kept them around. Then I would copy them and so on and got more and more interested. By the time I was maybe 16, I guess, 15, I started sending in cartoons to magazines. They had these contests in a magazine called Open Road for Boys. They would say: "Draw a cartoon in which you would say how this problem is solved." So I did that and I remember having a couple of things published, and I was very excited and so on... I think I got a dollar, a dollar prize.

Cover artists included Jacob Bates Abbott, George Avison, Clarence Doore, William D. Eaton and Charles Hargens.

In 1927, the magazine began a club for boys called Open Road Pioneers. The club's official pin, in gold and dark blue, displayed the left profile of a Davy Crockett-type adventurer wearing a coonskin cap and carrying a rifle.
