= Uneek Havana Cigar Company =

- U.S. National Register of Historic Places
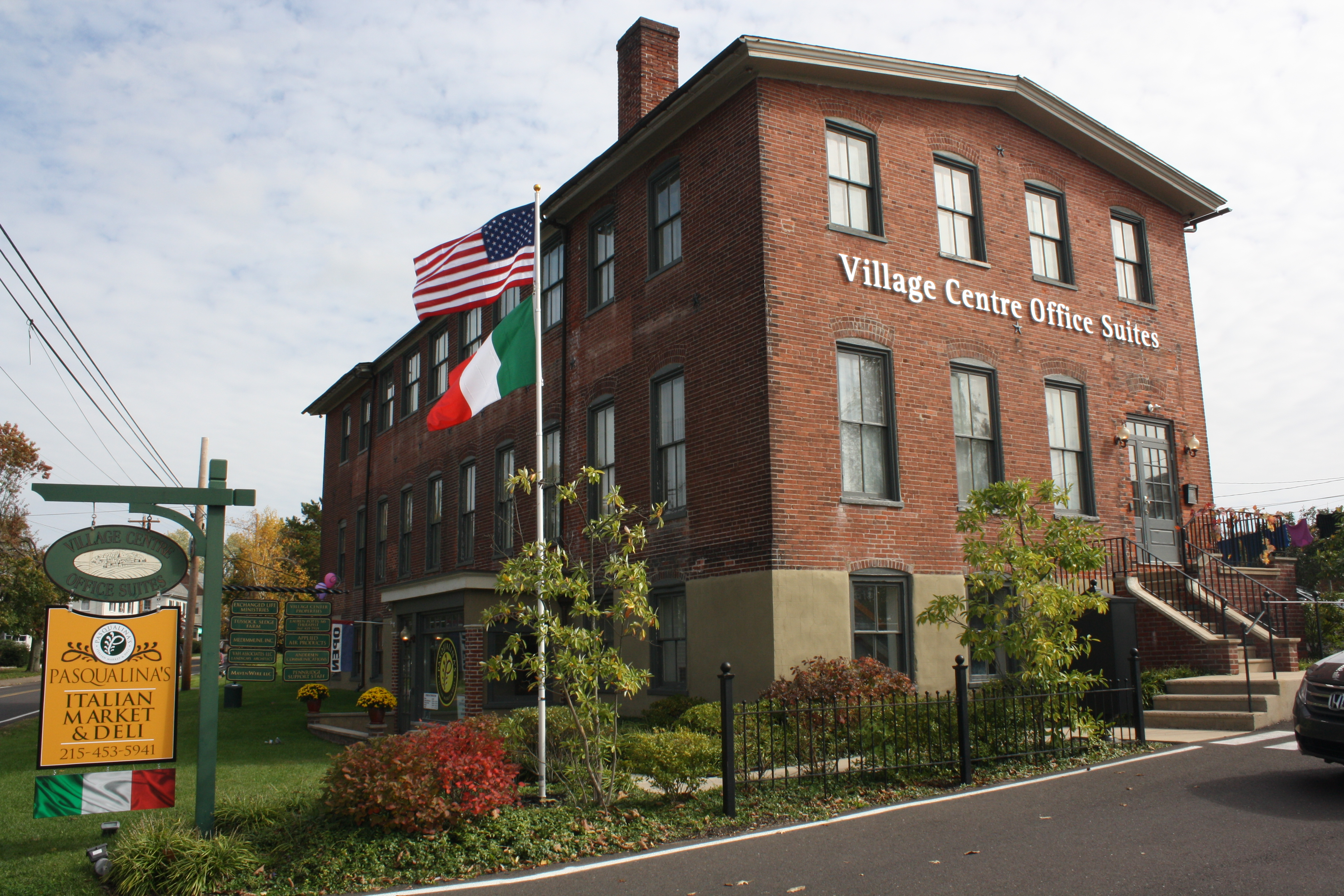
- Uneek Havana Cigar Company. October 2012.

- Location within Pennsylvania Location within the United States
- Location: 1259 Pennsylvania Route 113, Blooming Glen, Pennsylvania
- Coordinates: 40°22′07″N 75°15′02″W
- Area: less than one acre
- Architect: Martin, Oscar A.
- Architectural style: Early Commercial
- NRHP reference No.: 07001160
- Added to NRHP: November 7, 2007

The Uneek Havana Cigar Company, also known as the Sprecht Clothing Company, is a historic American factory building that is located in Blooming Glen, Hilltown Township, Bucks County, Pennsylvania.

It was added to the National Register of Historic Places in 2007.

== History and architectural features ==
Built between 1907 and 1910, this historic structure is a two-and-one-half-story, rectangular, brick building that measures eighty feet by thirty-two feet and sits on a stucco-covered, stone foundation. It has a low-pitched gable roof with broad overhangs reflective of the Arts and Crafts movement and was built and occupied by a cigar manufacturer until 1919, after which it housed a clothing manufacturer into the 1950s. It then housed various light manufacturing activities until 2004.

== Gallery ==
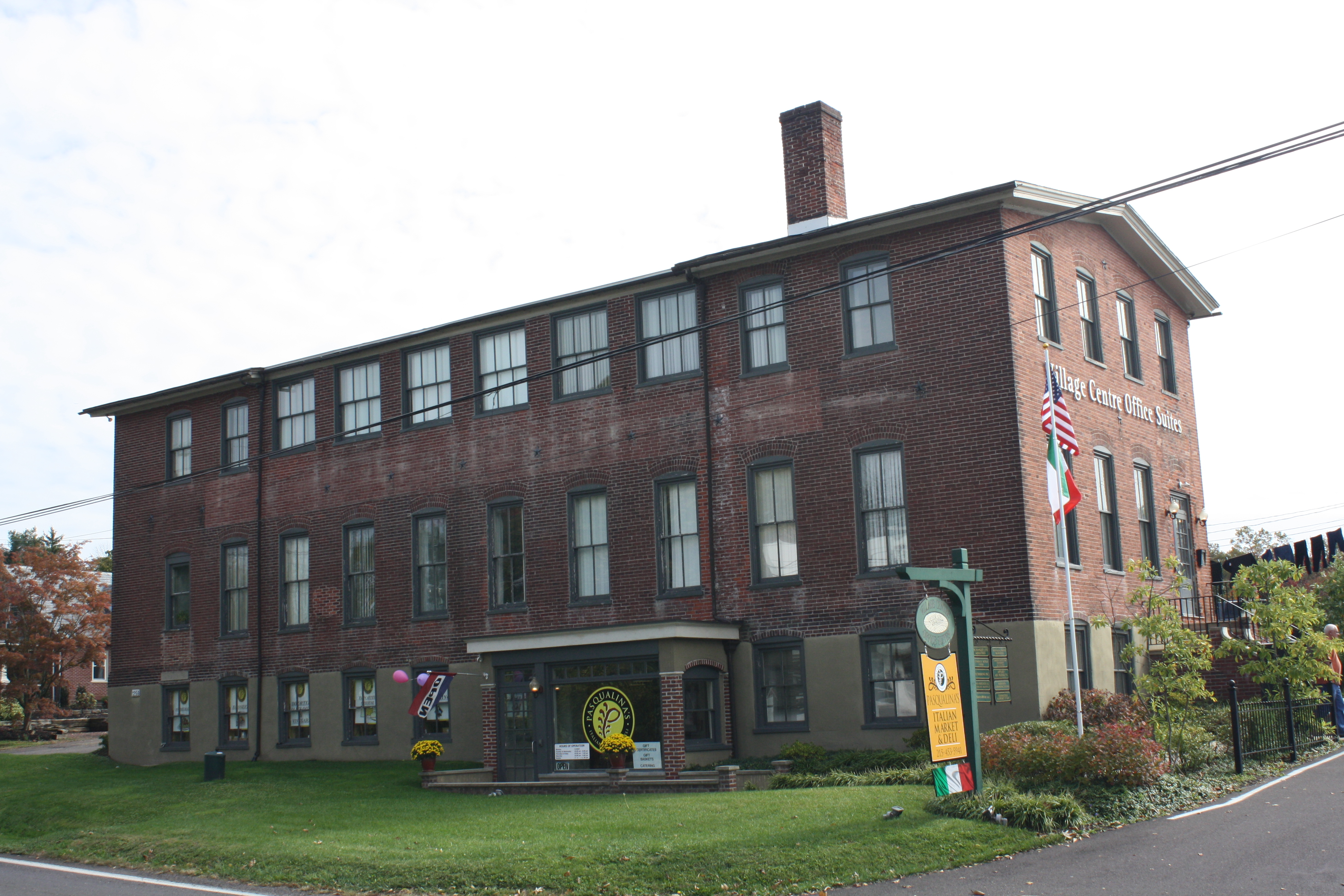
Front view from Pennsylvania Route 113

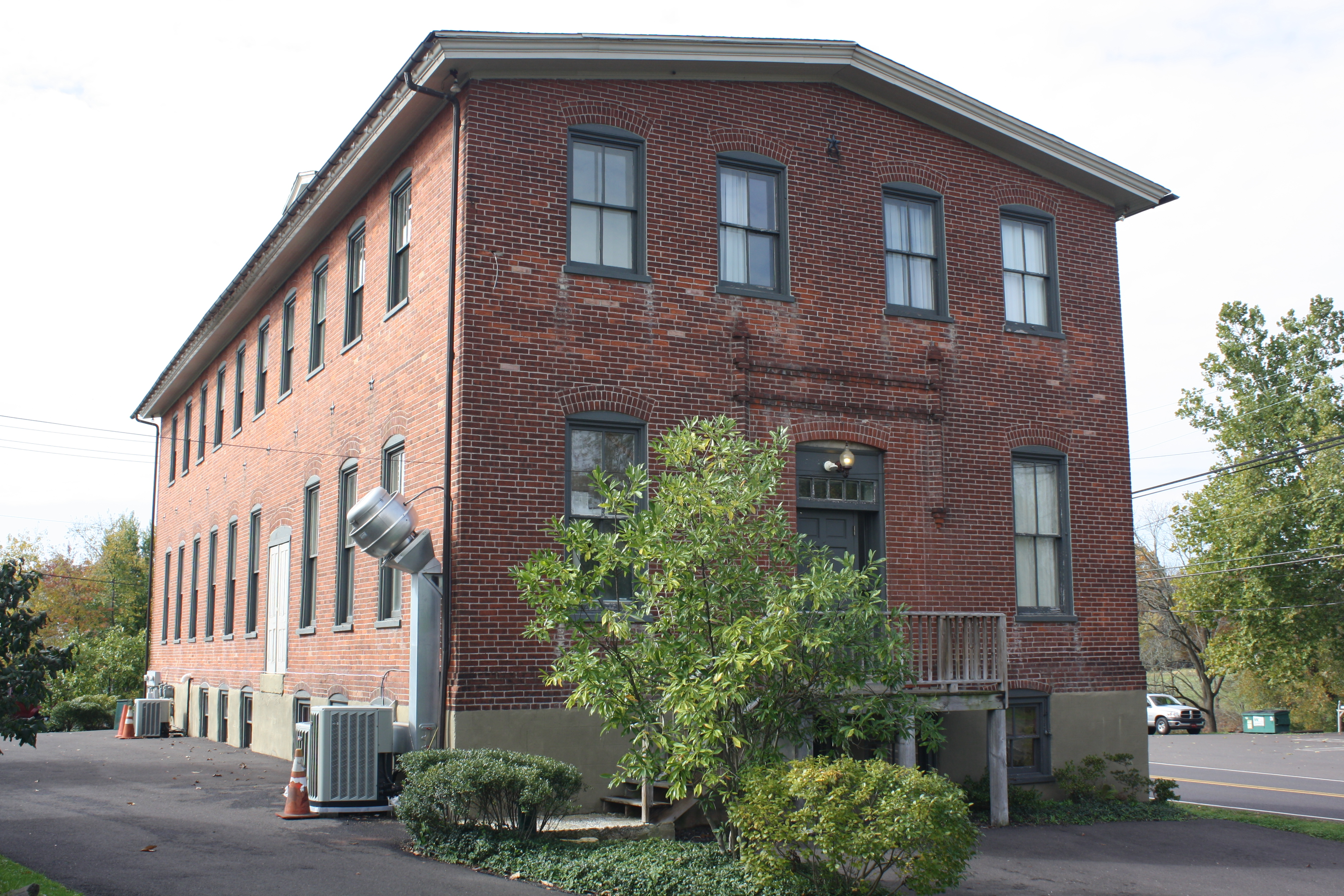
East side and back yard

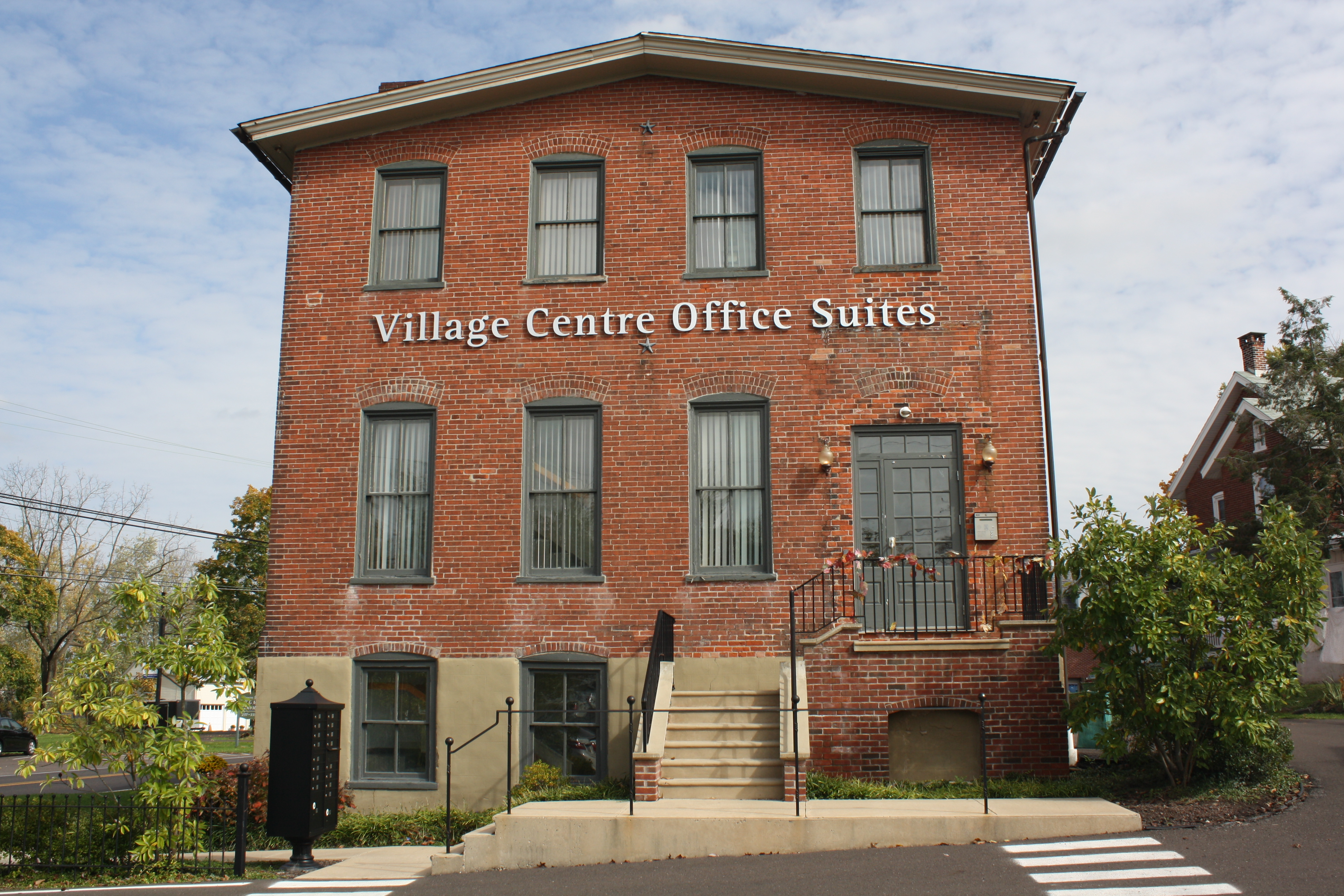
West side, Village Centre Office Suites

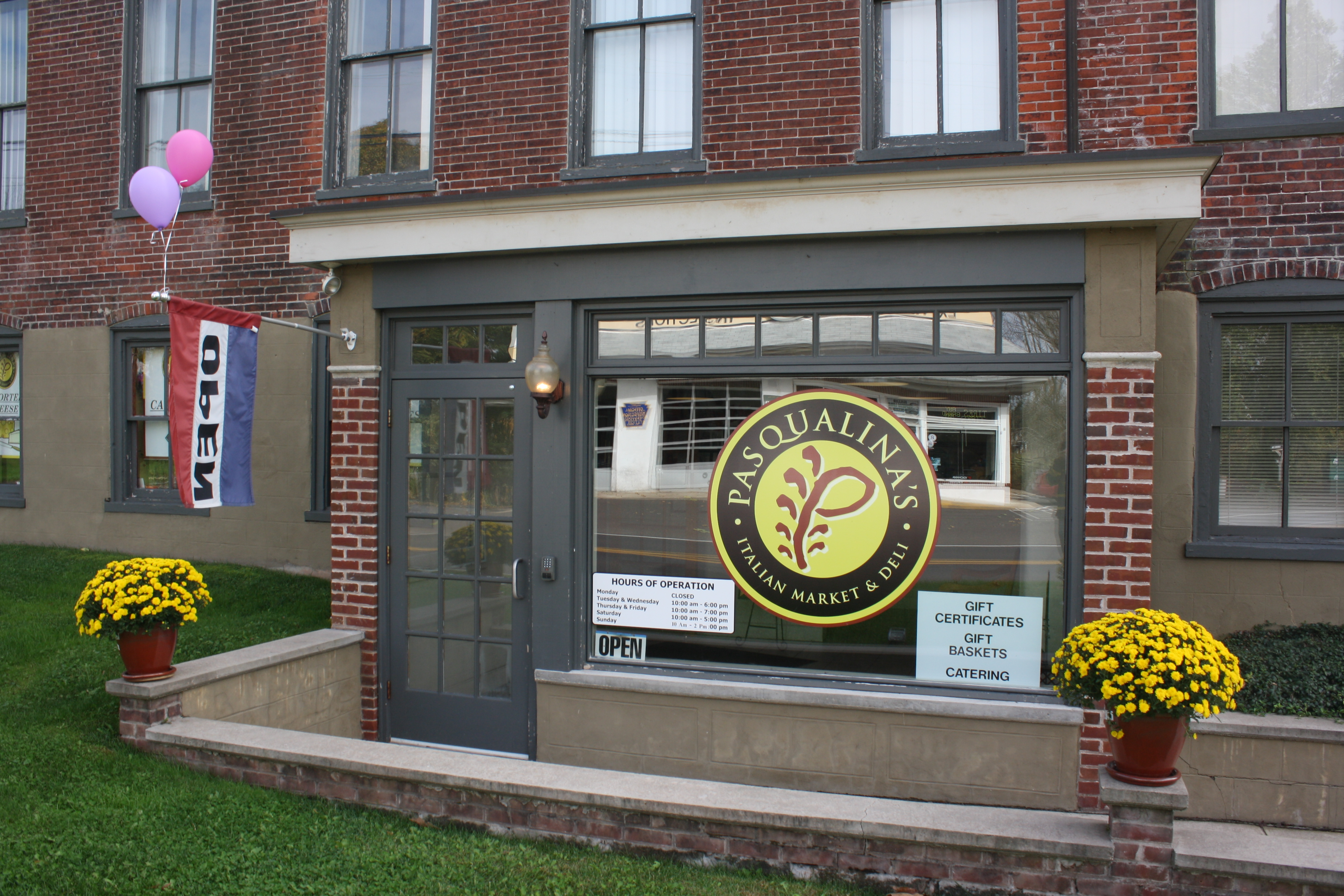
Main Entrance, Italian Market

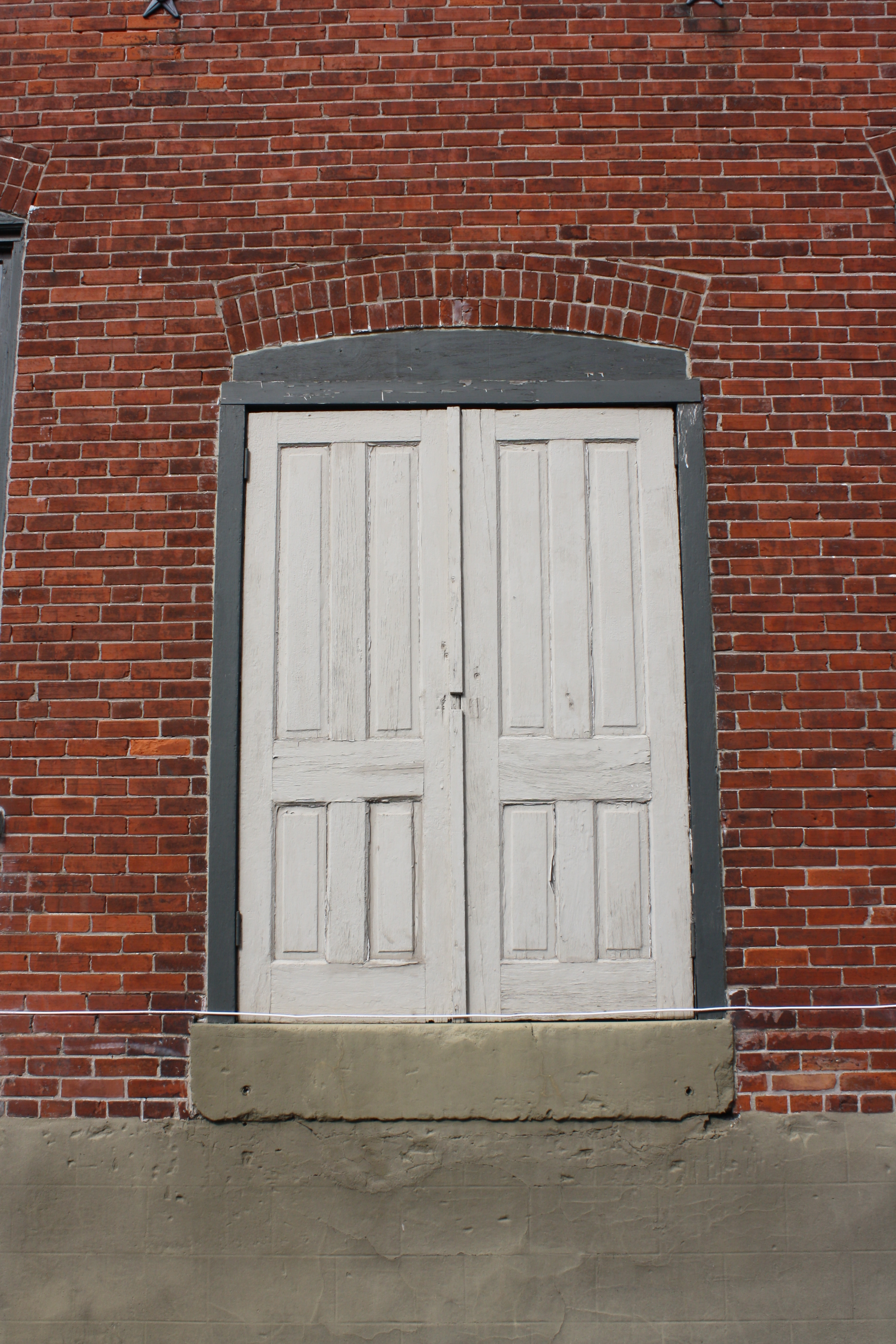
Former door on back yard

== See also ==
- Teller Cigar Factory: also part of the Sprecht Clothing Company
- National Register of Historic Places listings in Bucks County, Pennsylvania
