= Teller Cigar Factory =

- U.S. National Register of Historic Places
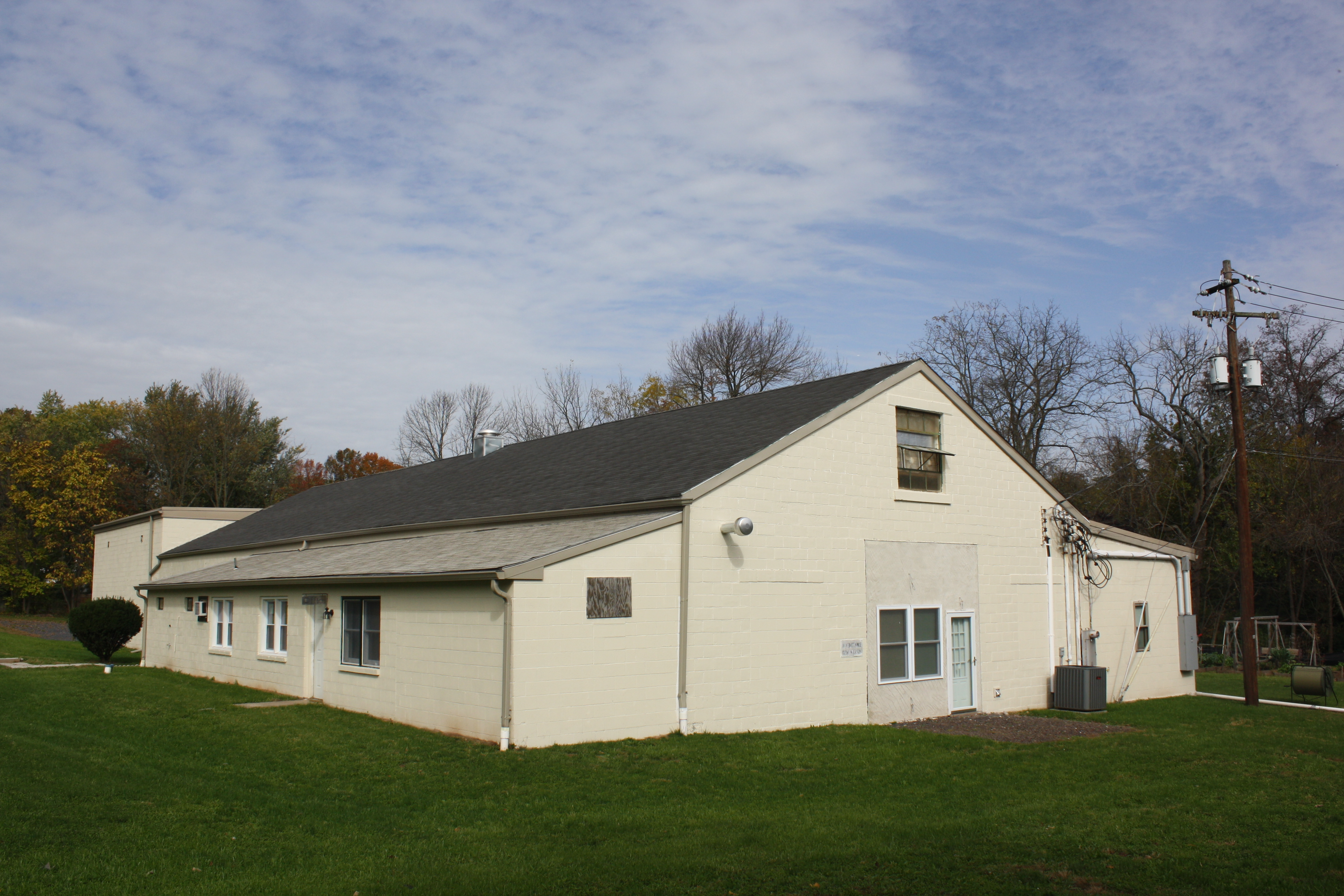
- Teller Cigar Factory. October 2012.

- Location within Pennsylvania Location within the United States
- Location: 340 N. Main St., Sellersville, Pennsylvania
- Coordinates: 40°21′43″N 75°18′48″W
- Area: 0.5 acres (0.20 ha)
- Built: c. 1866, 1895
- Built by: Clymer, A.L.
- NRHP reference No.: 86003567
- Added to NRHP: January 6, 1987

The Teller Cigar Factory, also known as the Sprecht Clothing Company, is an historic factory building in Sellersville, Bucks County, Pennsylvania, United States.

It was added to the National Register of Historic Places in 1987.

== History and architectural features ==
The original section of this historic structure was built circa 1866, and was then expanded in 1895. It is a 2 1/2-story, stone structure that was expanded with the addition of a 2 1/2-story, brick structure. Both were plastered and have gable roofs.

The building, which ten bays wide and four bays deep, represents the transition of the cigar industry from home-based manufacture efforts to large manufacturing facility production. It was occupied by a cigar manufacturer at least into the 1920s, and was later used as a warehouse for a plumbing and heating supply company.

== Gallery ==
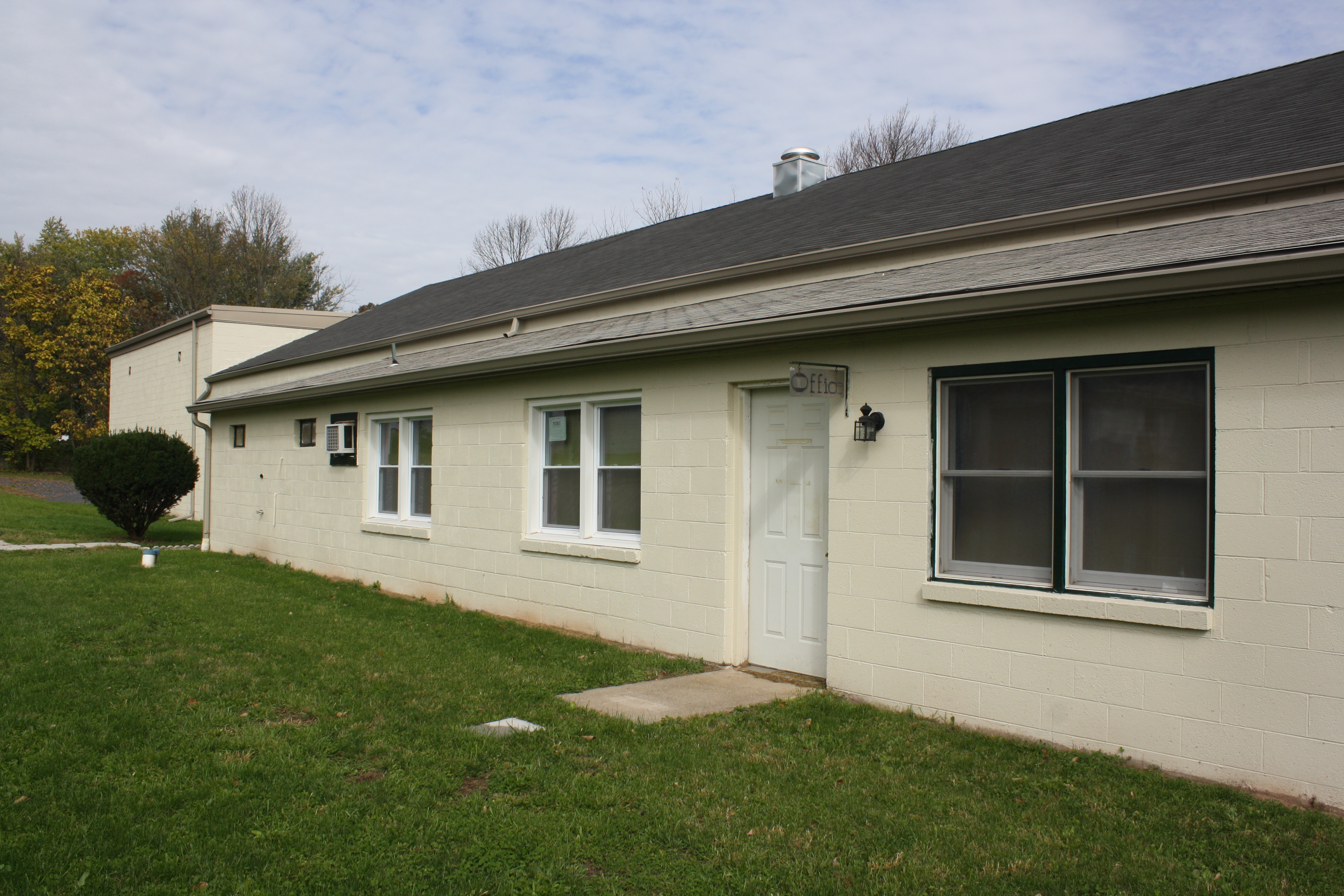
Office.

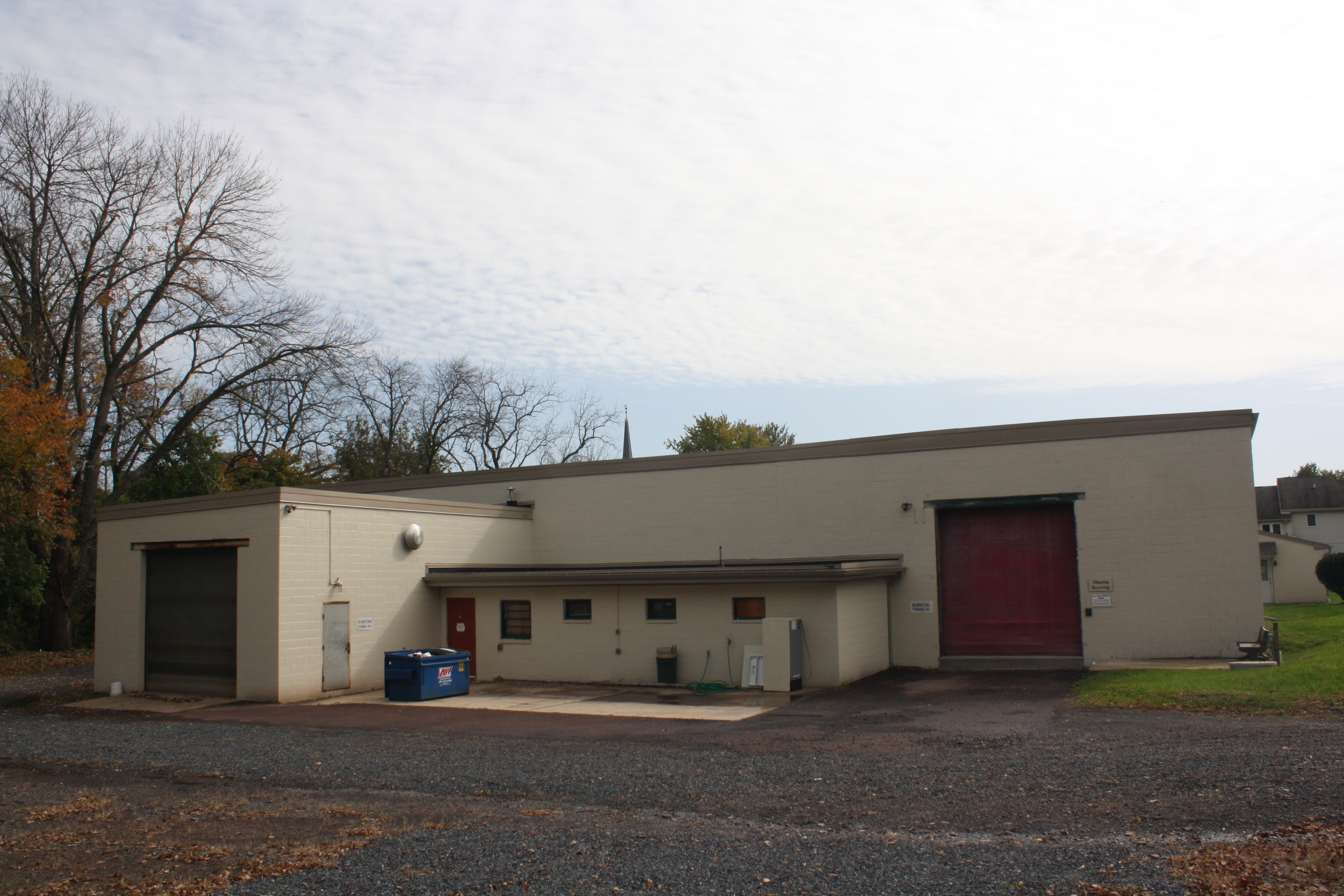
West Wing. Loading Dock.

== See also ==
- Uneek Havana Cigar Company: also part of the Sprecht Clothing Company
- National Register of Historic Places listings in Bucks County, Pennsylvania
